= Dhawan =

Surname found in India

Dhawan is a surname associated with the Khatri caste found in Punjab, India.

== Etymology ==
It is popularly believed to mean "runner" or "messenger" which is derived from the Sanskrit word "dhav" (to run). As per the historian R.C. Dogra, Dhawan translates to "messenger of the battlefield". Before 1947, they were found in the districts of Lahore, Jhang, Lyallpur and Shahpur in West Punjab, now part of Pakistan.

== Notable people ==
Notable people who bear the name, although they may not necessarily be connected to the caste group, include:

- Anil Dhawan, Indian actor
- Ashish Dhawan (born 1969), Indian private equity investor and philanthropist
- Ashita Dhawan (born 1980), Indian television actress
- Ashok Dhawan (born 1947), Indian politician
- Bhupender Dhawan, Indian weightlifter and coach
- David Dhawan (born 1951), Indian film director
- Deepak Dhawan (1955–1987), Communist activist from Punjab
- Dilip Dhawan (1955–2000), Indian actor
- Harmohan Dhawan (1940–2024), Indian politician and former member of Parliament
- Ishaan Dhawan (born 1995), Indian actor
- Jyotsna Dhawan, Indian cell and developmental biologist
- Krishan Dhawan (1926–1994), Indian actor
- Mehar Chand Dhawan (born 1912), Indian sprinter and triple jumper
- Nikita Dhawan (born 1972), Indian political scientist
- Prem Dhawan (1923–2001), Indian lyricist
- Rajeev Dhavan (born 1946), Indian lawyer and human rights activist
- Rani Dhavan Shankardass, Indian social historian and prison reform expert
- Ravi S. Dhavan (1942–2016), Indian judge
- Rishi Dhawan (born 1990), Indian cricketer
- Robin Dhowan, Indian admiral and the 22nd Indian Navy Chief
- R. K. Dhawan (1937–2018), Indian politician
- Rohit Dhawan (born 1983), Indian film director
- Ruhanika Dhawan (born 2007), Indian actress
- Sabrina Dhawan, England-born Indian screenwriter and producer
- Sacha Dhawan (born 1984), English actor
- Satish Dhawan (1920–2002), Indian aerospace engineer and rocket scientist
- Shanti Swaroop Dhavan (1906–1978), Indian statesman, diplomat and jurist
- Shikhar Dhawan (born 1985), Indian international cricketer
- Shruti Dhawan (born 1982), Indian tennis player
- Varun Dhawan (born 1987), Indian actor
