= Aditi Shankardass =

British neuroscientist

- Born: London, UK
- Education: King's College London, University College London, University of Sheffield
- Known for: Cognitive neuroscience, EEG, dyslexia, autism
- Scientific career
- Fields: Neuroscience
- Workplaces: Boston Children's Hospital, Harvard Medical School

Aditi Shankardass (Hindi: अदिती शंकरदास) is a British neuroscientist.

She has appeared in the media to discuss developmental disorders in children, including on CNN, ABC News, the Times of India, and the Financial Express. She discussed the topic in her talk in 2009 at the TED conference.

She was part of the group led by Dr. Frank H. Duffy of the department of psychiatry at Boston Children's Hospital, affiliated with Harvard Medical School. Their work on the creation of a specific neurological biomarkers for autism has been featured in the Time book Time 100 New Scientific Discoveries. Her previous work using EEG recordings of the brain to help identify the underlying neurological cause of dyslexia was the subject of her presentation at the United Kingdom Parliament in 2001 at the Annual Reception for Britain's Top Young Scientists, Engineers and Technologists.

Shankardass serves as a board member of the Global Neuroscience Initiative Foundation, an organisation devoted to raising global awareness of neurological and psychiatric disorders. She has been a consultant for the BBC in the UK, providing expertise for radio and TV documentaries.

Shankardass is a classically trained singer, with concert performances in India, the UK and the US, and live recordings with Amjad Ali Khan, Anup Jalota and on BBC Radio. She has been a TV presenter on Zee TV in the UK and appeared in several documentaries. She has acted on stage and TV in India, as well as in the US feature film, Trafficked. She has been noted for her attractiveness.

Her father is celebrity lawyer Vijay Shankardass, whose clients include the Nizam of Hyderabad, author Salman Rushdie, actor Michael Douglas, Amnesty International, Taj Hotels Resorts and Palaces, Penguin Books and Virgin Group. Her mother is social historian and Penal Reform International chairperson Rani Dhavan Shankardass. She is the granddaughter of Shanti Swaroop Dhavan, governor of West Bengal and Indian high commissioner (ambassador) to the United Kingdom. She is the great-granddaughter of Rai Bahadur (Most Honorable Prince) Bali Ram Dhavan of the North West Frontier Province, formerly of India.

Shankardass was born in London, educated between New Delhi and London, and currently resides between Los Angeles and Boston.
