= Ravi S. Dhavan =

Indian judge

Ravi Swaroop Dhavan (22 July 1942 – 5 January 2016) was an Indian judge and former Chief justice of the Patna High Court. He was the son of Justice Shanti Swaroop Dhavan, the 7th Governor of West Bengal. He was brother to lawyer Rajeev Dhavan.

== Career ==
Dhavan was born in 1942. He did his schooling from Sherwood College, Nainital and passed Law and enrolled as an Advocate under the Uttar Pradesh Bar Council in 1966. Dhavan started practice in the Allahabad High Court on civil, taxation and constitutional law issues. He served as the Senior Standing Counsel for the Government of India in the High Court. On 9 January 1986 he was elevated as a permanent judge of the Allahabad High Court. Dhavan became the Chief Justice of Patna High Court on 25 January 2000 and retired on 22 July 2004.
