= Vishwa Nath Sharma =

Chief of the Army Staff (India) from 1988 to 1990

General Vishwa Nath Sharma PVSM, AVSM, ADC
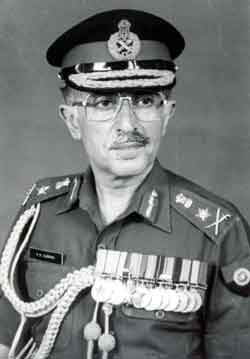
- Official portrait

14th Chief of the Army Staff
- In office 1 June 1988 – 30 June 1990
- President: R. Venkataraman
- Prime Minister: Rajiv Gandhi; Vishwanath Pratap Singh
- Preceded by: Krishnaswamy Sundarji
- Succeeded by: Sunith Francis Rodrigues

19th General Officer Commanding-in-Chief Eastern Command
- In office June 1987 – April 1988
- President: Giani Zail Singh; R. Venkataraman
- Prime Minister: Rajiv Gandhi
- Preceded by: JK Puri
- Succeeded by: Raj Mohan Vohra
- Chief of Army Staff: Krishnaswamy Sundarji

Personal details
- Born: 4 June 1930 London, England
- Died: 31 July 2026 (aged 96) New Delhi, India
- Relations: Maj. Gen. Amar Nath Sharma (father); Maj Somnath Sharma (brother); Lt. Gen. Surindra Nath Sharma (brother)
- Awards: Param Vishisht Seva Medal; Ati Vishisht Seva Medal
- Nickname(s): Tich; Sunny

Military service
- Allegiance: India
- Branch/service: Indian Army
- Years of service: 1950–1990
- Rank: General
- Unit: 16th Light Cavalry; 66th Armoured Regiment
- Commands: Eastern Army; 66th Armoured Regiment
- Battles/wars: Nagaland Insurgency of 1956; Indo-Pakistani War of 1965; Indo-Pakistani War of 1971; Mizoram Insurgency of 1973; IPKF Operation of 1987
- Service number: IC-4769

General Vishwa Nath Sharma, PVSM, AVSM, ADC (June 4, 1930 – July 31, 2026) was an Indian Army General, who served as the Chief of the Army Staff of the Indian Army from 1988 to 1990. He was the first president's commissioned officer to lead the Indian Army, having been commissioned in June 1950.

== Early life ==
His father, Major General Amar Nath Sharma, was also a military officer. He was the younger brother of the late Major Som Nath Sharma, recipient of Independent India's first posthumous Param Vir Chakra, and also Lieutenant General Surindra Nath Sharma, formerly Engineer in Chief of the Indian Army as well was Major Dr. Kamla Tewari (née Sharma) of the Medical Corps of the Indian Army. The family hailed from Dadh Village in Kangra district, in present-day Himachal Pradesh. Both brothers were educated at the Prince of Wales' Royal Indian Military College, Dehradun. All three brothers did their schooling at Sherwood College, Nainital.

== Military career ==
Sharma went on to join the fifth Regular Course at the Indian Military Academy, Dehradun and he was commissioned on 4 June 1950 into the 16th Light Cavalry. He fought in the 1965 War against Pakistan in the Lahore Sector. He commanded the 66th Armoured Regiment and later a Mountain Brigade in an insurgency-affected area. Awarded the Ati Vishisht Seva Medal for distinguished service, General Sharma took over as GOC-in-C of the Eastern Command, on 1 June 1987 and was appointed Honorary Army ADC to the President on 25 July 1987. He took over as the Chief of Army Staff on 1 May 1988.

== Post-military career ==
- Board of directors, Local Advisory Board of India, ABN AMRO, 1991–97
- Board of directors, Diamond & Gem Development Corporation, 1993–97
- Board of directors, Hawkins Cookers Limited, 2001–20??
- Member, Institute for Defence Studies and Analyses, 1990–2026
- Member, United Services Institute of India, 1955–2026
- Member, National Security Advisory Board, 2006–09
- Free Tuberculosis & Medical Centre, Dadh, Himachal Pradesh, 1992–2026

== Death ==
Sharma died in New Delhi on 31 July 2026, at the age of 96.

== Honours and awards ==

| Param Vishisht Seva Medal | Ati Vishist Seva Medal | Samar Seva Star | Paschimi Star |
| Raksha Medal | Sangram Medal | Sainya Seva Medal | High Altitude Service Medal |
| 25th Anniversary of Independence Medal | 30 Years Long Service Medal | 20 Years Long Service Medal | 9 Years Long Service Medal |

== Dates of rank ==
| Insignia | Rank | Component | Date of rank |
|---|---|---|---|
| | Second Lieutenant | Indian Army | 4 June 1950 |
| | Lieutenant | Indian Army | 4 June 1952 |
| | Captain | Indian Army | 4 June 1956 |
| | Major | Indian Army | 4 June 1963 |
| | Lieutenant-Colonel | Indian Army | 14 June 1968 |
| | Colonel | Indian Army | 3 April 1974 |
| | Brigadier | Indian Army | 2 February 1975 |
| | Major General | Indian Army | 1 July 1980 |
| | Lieutenant-General | Indian Army | 1984 |
| | General (COAS) | Indian Army | 1 May 1988 |

Military offices
| Preceded by Krishnaswamy Sundarji | Chief of Army Staff; 1988–1990 | Succeeded by Sunith Francis Rodrigues |
| Preceded by J K Puri | General Officer Commanding-in-Chief Eastern Command; 1987–1988 | Succeeded by Raj Mohan Vohra |
