= Kanyashree University =

Government University for Girls located at Krishnanagar

- Motto: Empowering Women
- Type: Public
- Established: 2020; 6 years ago
- Affiliations: UGC
- Chancellor: Governor of West Bengal
- Vice-Chancellor: Dr. Tapati Chakraborti
- Location: Krishnanagar, Nadia district, West Bengal, India
- Website: www.kanyashreeuniversity.ac.in

Kanyashree University is a public women's university in Krishnagar, Nadia district, West Bengal, India. It is the second university in West Bengal for women, after Diamond Harbour Women's University.

== Founding ==
The university takes its name from the Kanyashree scheme, a West Bengal government conditional programme for girl students launched in 2013 that received the United Nations Public Service Award. Chief Minister Mamata Banerjee announced the university on 14 August 2018, stating that she wanted scheme beneficiaries to have a university where they could study without worrying about admissions after their board exams. The higher education, technical education, and women and child welfare departments, together with UNICEF, were called to a planning meeting on 23 August 2018.

The state government announced Krishnagar as the university's location a month later, and the Kanyashree University bill was passed in the West Bengal Legislative Assembly on 29 November 2018. State education minister Partha Chatterjee subsequently inspected potential sites and selected a 12.5-acre plot adjacent to Krishnagar Government College for the permanent campus. Banerjee laid the foundation stone on 10 January 2019. The state government also announced plans to establish Kanyashree colleges across the state's districts alongside the university.

Admissions to four initial postgraduate programmes began in 2020, with temporary classes initially held at Krishnanagar Women's College; then the Academic Campus moved to Krishnagar Collegiate School, and the Administrative Campus is located at Krishnanagar Government College.

== Legal status and governance ==
Kanyashree University was constituted under the Kanyashree University Act, 2018, a West Bengal state legislation that received the Governor's assent on 2 January 2019. The Act establishes it as a State-aided university headquartered in Nadia district, with territorial jurisdiction extending throughout West Bengal.

Under the Kanyashree University Act, 2018, the authorities of the university include the Governing Board (s. 22(i)), Schools for Post-graduate and Undergraduate Studies (s. 22(ii)), Boards of Studies (s. 22(iii)), and the Finance Committee (s. 22(iv)). The Vice-Chancellor is designated as the university's principal executive and academic officer (s. 13(1)).

The First Statue of Kanyashree University 2026 has been also approved by the Hon'ble Chancellor and Governor of West Bengal in January 2026.

== Administration ==
Professor Tapati Chakraborti is currently serving as vice-chancellor of Kanyashree University; in 2025 (appointment order). Professor Tapati Chakraborti received the state government's Siksharatna award for contributions to higher education and research, recognising a career that included teaching at Kalyani University from 2002 and leading approximately 16 to 17 central government research projects.

In 2023, amid a dispute between the state government and Governor C. V. Ananda Bose over vice-chancellor appointments across state universities, the Governor appointed Professor Kajal De, who had previously served as interim vice-chancellor at Diamond Harbour Women's University, as officiating vice-chancellor of Kanyashree University. Around the same time, the West Bengal Assembly passed a bill reconstituting committees for appointment of VCs, and transferring the chancellorship of state-aided universities from the Governor to the Chief Minister.

=== Administrative disputes ===
In 2025, the then university's Controller of Examinations Biswajit Datta raised concerns about alleged violations of reservation norms in the postgraduate admission process. The state's Joint Commissioner for Reservation requested a report from the university on both the admission process and guest faculty recruitment. The Backward Classes Welfare Department had issued show-cause notices to the university on two occasions over alleged non-compliance with reservation requirements and UGC guidelines in faculty appointments.

In 2026 Datta was removed from his post before his contract ended. At a subsequent press conference Datta alleged his removal was retaliation for reporting misconduct and described it as humiliating, also claiming that free NET coaching classes and a dedicated library for women students had been discontinued since the current vice-chancellor took charge. VC Chakraborty dismissed his allegations, stating that his contract had been terminated following repeated insubordination.

== Campus ==
As of 2023 around 1,000 students were enrolled across eleven subjects, while construction of the permanent campus remained stalled; approximately 25.5 crore rupees had been allocated but not disbursed, and a revised estimate of around 27 crore rupees had been submitted to account for increased construction costs and changes in GST rates.

The empty space for building Kanyashree University's upcoming Campus

The main gate of Kanyashree University campus (under construction)

== Academics ==
The university offers two-year postgraduate programmes through eleven academic departments. Its programmes cover Bengali, English, Sanskrit, History, Geography, Social Work, Education, Law, Food and Nutrition, Mathematics, and Mass Communication and Journalism. The university also periodically offers certificate and skill-development programmes and coaching programmes for national and state eligibility examinations.. The certificate courses taught at the university is as following;

1. Communicative English and Writing
2. Spoken Sanskrit
3. Creative Writing
4. Social Media Management and Content Writing
5. Psychological Counselling
6. Advance Dietetics & Applied Nutrition
7. Spatial Intelligence: Fundamentals of GIS and Remote Sensing
8. Statistics and Its Applications or Statistical Methods
9. Cultural Heritage and Tourism Development Management
10. Intellectual Property Rights

=== Academic Departments ===
Language

- Department of Bengali
- Department of English
- Department of Sanskrit

Social Sciences

- Department of History
- Department of Geography
- Department of Social Work
- Department of Education
- Department of Law
- Mass Communication and Convergent Journalism

Science

- Department of Food and Nutrition
- Department of Mathematics

== See also ==
- Education in India
- Education in West Bengal
- List of universities in India
