= Rahul Johri =

Businessman

President - Business, South Asia - Zee Entertainment Enterprises Ltd.

Chief Executive Officer of BCCI

Personal details
- Spouse: Seema Johri
- Children: Yash Johri Dhruv Johri
- Education: Bareilly College; M. J. P. Rohilkhand University; Sherwood College

Rahul Johri presently serves as President – Business, South Asia of Zee Entertainment Enterprises Ltd (having previously served as Executive Vice President and General Manager - South Asia for Discovery Networks Asia Pacific). He was the 1st Chief Executive Officer at the Board of Control for Cricket in India. Johri was responsible for the functioning of operations, stakeholder management and building strategies for further promoting the sport.

== Education ==
In 1989, Johri graduated from Bareilly College. In 1991, he received an MBA from MJP Rohilkhand University. He is an alumnus of Sherwood College, Nainital, Uttarakhand.

== Career ==
Johri has over 25 years of experience in the media industry, working across news channels, magazines and news dailies, including AajTak, Outlook and Hindustan Times. While at Discovery he has served as a Board Member and Treasurer of the Indian Broadcasting Foundation (IBF). He also served as a member of the media and entertainment committee of the Confederation of Indian Industries (CII) and was a member of the film and television committee of the Federation of Indian Chambers of Commerce and Industry (FICCI). He has been a member of the Executive Board of the Indo American Chambers of Commerce (ASSOCHAM).

Board of Control for Cricket in India

In April 2016, Johri was announced as the first Chief Executive Officer at the Board of Control for Cricket in India (BCCI) and assumed the position on 1 June 2016. He oversaw the sale of IPL broadcast rights to Star India for Rs. 16,348 crore, doubling the previous broadcast rights sale to Sony India in 2012 for Rs. 8,200 crore. The media rights for BCCI and IPL were awarded to Star India in 2017.

Johri supervised the Indian Cricket team's current sponsorship agreement. In March 2017, BCCI announced OPPO Digital as Team India's (senior, junior and women's teams) new sponsor. The five-year contract is worth Rs 1079 crore.

In April 2018, Johri led BCCI to conduct a transparent media rights auction for domestic and international cricket. The auction partners were Deloitte Haskins and Sells LLP, and Cyril Amarchand Mangaldas. The media rights were sold to Star India for Rs 6138.1 crore. The current deal includes global consolidated rights, including television and digital telecast of the 102 international matches which includes 22 Tests, 42 ODIs and 38 Twenty20 Internationals.

On 9 July 2020, BCCI accepted his resignation from the post of CEO of BCCI. He submitted his resignation on 27 December 2019 but as per the BCCI Officials due to the Covid-19 situation, the board has taken this decision that late.

Discovery Communications

Rahul Johri led Discovery's South Asia operations and managed overall growth strategy of Discovery Networks Asia Pacific's (DNAP) portfolio which included eight brands in the region - Discovery Channel, Animal Planet, TLC, Discovery Science, Discovery Turbo, Discovery HD World, Discovery Channel Tamil and Discovery Kids. He was also responsible for revenue generation, portfolio expansion, affiliate partnerships, viewership, content creation and talent management. Johri joined Discovery in 2001 as Director – Ad Sales, became VP – Ad Sales in 2003 and helped create a diverse portfolio of channels in India. In 2008, he assumed the responsibility as SVP and General Manager – South Asia. During his leadership, DNAP's portfolio grew from three to eight networks in South Asia. Aiming to broaden the networks’ reach, he implemented localisation strategy and launched multiple language feeds across brands. His latest initiative was the launch of Discovery Kids; a children's channel nationally broadcast in India.

== Awards ==
In January 2013, Johri was selected as ‘CEO of the Year’ at the Broadcasting Industry Awards, for his contribution to the Indian television industry. In 2012, he received the ‘Media Professional of the Year’ award by the World Brand Congress. During his leadership, Discovery Networks Asia-Pacific was awarded ‘Best Media and Entertainment Company’ in 2012 by the Indo American Chambers of Commerce.

In 2017, Johri was listed amongst the top 10 Sports Business Executives of the Year by Sport Business, for his contribution to the 550% jump in the IPL media right sale.

== Family ==
Rahul Johri along with his wife Seema Johri, have two children - Yash Johri (25) and Dhruv Johri (21).
