= Neville Bower =

Anglo-Indian British composer and concert pianist

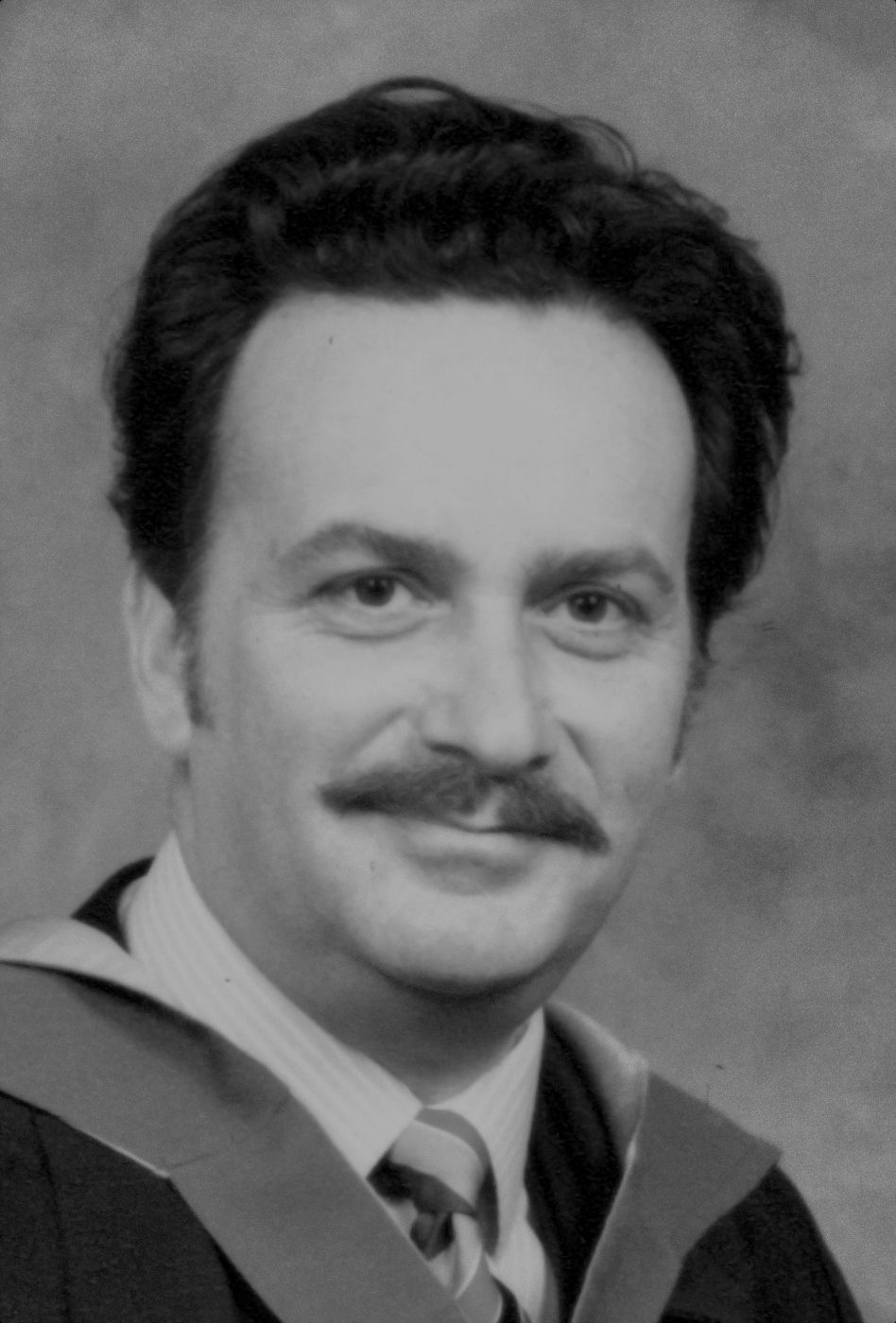
Neville Bower circa 1985.

Neville Courtenay Bower (3 October 1934 – 22 September 2007) was an Anglo-Indian British composer, concert pianist, and educator. He is best known for his solo piano repertoire, chamber music and contributions to modern song cycle repertory, particularly for the countertenor.

== Early life and education ==
Bower was born in Allahabad, India. He was first educated at schools in Allahabad, then Sherwood College, Nainital (1945-1949). Bower had shown great promise playing piano from a young age. In 1947 he achieved the highest examination mark in India from Trinity College London winning a special scholarship for the second year in succession; later attaining ATCL in 1948 and LTCL in 1949.

When his family emigrated to the United Kingdom in 1950, they settled in London; there, Bower attended Battersea Polytechnic where he matriculated in 1951. He enrolled at the Royal College of Music (RCM) in 1951, where he studied piano with Kendall Taylor, composition with Patrick Hadley, organ with Osborne Peasgood, clarinet with Ralph Clarke, accompaniment with Hilda Klien, and theory studies with Harry Stubbs. Bower graduated ARCM in 1954, then LRAM for teaching in 1956. Later in life he achieved a BA from the Open University in 1985, and FTCL for composition from Trinity College London in 1987, the later being examined by Geoffrey Bush.

== Concert pianist ==
After graduating from the RCM in 1956 Bower spent two years teaching at a comprehensive - Manor Secondary Modern School, Ruislip - before returning to attempt a performance career. He worked as a ballet pianist at Ballet Rambert school, and performed recitals in London and Oxford. When the Holywell Music Room was refurbished in 1959, Bower performed a programme of piano-duos with Jessie Munro upon its reopening.

In 1962 Bower performed Liszt's first piano concerto with the Modern Symphony Orchestra under Arthur Dennington, in which he "captured much of the glitter and excitement in a performance which was essentially masculine and suited the work very well." The critic noting his, "Octave runs and scale passages were commendably clean and accurate."

Bower's masculine performance style was not to everyone's taste, another critic wrote, "Although he [Bower] had quite a good command of the keyboard, he performed Beethoven's reflective E Flat Sonata, Op. 27 (Quasi una Fantasia) in the manner of a Czerny study, and left Debussy's mysterious L'Isle Joyesue in the state of a battlefield."

One of Bowers last outings as a concert pianist was the first Leeds International Piano Competition. Not long after, the injuries from a car accident ended the prospect of a performance career.

== Teaching ==
Following the end of his concert pianist career Bower taught at Henry Compton School, Fulham, then music master at Ealing Grammar School (1967-1974).

During Bower's tenure at Ealing Grammar the school ensembles performed regularly. The school choir sang annual festival nine lessons and carols at St Mary's Church, South Ealing; an outing organised by Bower himself; which was always popular well attended.

Under Bower's direction the school choir performed music outside the typical range of secondary students; performing in concerts under conductors such as Norman Del Mar, Henryk Czyż, and Antal Doráti. He prepared the school choir for a performance of the St Matthew Passion with Roger Norrington as the Evangelist. Later, in the same year, Bower conducted a performance of the Messiah with soloists including Kenneth Woollam.

The school choir won awards, recorded an album of Christmas music, and performed on radio and television. Bower and a number of his students appeared in the film Goodbye, Mr. Chips as conductor and school orchestra respectively.

The last secondary teaching position Bower held was at Slough (Upton) Grammar School (1974-1986); after retiring from secondary teaching, he worked as a music examiner at London University (1987-1995).

== Composition ==
Bower wrote his first composition at the age of ten. His early music written in India was lost to harsh conditions and his family's moving around. Bower wrote for the people around him; students, friends and colleagues. His first compositions published between 1962 and 1965) by Boosey & Hawkes were for school choirs (Op.1, Nos. 1-3).

In 1966 Bower's Sonata for oboe and piano (Op. 9) won the Waltham Forest Contemporary Music Competition; a sonata Leon Goossens is reported to have described as 'splendid'. In 1971, Bower wrote Concertante for oboe and orchestra (Op. 15) for oboist Janice Knight; premiered the following year with West London Symphony Orchestra.

Bower's works for organ are considered a significant contribution to the repertory of modern organ music. Eternal (Op. 32) for organ was premiered a Lichfield Cathedral in 1988 by Jonathan Rees-Williams. The organist Kevin Bowyer described Eternal (Op. 32) as an "unjustly neglected piece of British organ music." Detailed descriptions of Bower's organ works are included in a notable reference book for modern and contemporary organ music.

His sacred music has been performed at many cathedrals and notable venues, including St George's Chapel, Windsor Castle. An entry containing Bower's biography and a list of his sacred compositions appears in the Dictionary of Composers for the Church in Great Britain and Ireland.

In the early 1990s Bower self-published two pieces from Five-Finger Colours for Young Pianists (Op. 2a). These pieces were compared to World Renowned Easy Piano Pieces compiled by David Wilson, the review stating

Equally interesting and valuable are two self publications by Neville Bower from a series called five-finger colours – well named because of the composer's clear fascination with sonority and harmony while keeping well within Grade V standard. A pretty Bells of Rouen and an icy Snowscape would introduce young pupils to a sound world not easily accessible or available at this level. Each piece costs about £2. Available from the composer ... Compare these modestly presented pieces with the smart, expensive Schott/Kunzelmann publication (£6.35) of Six Amusing Exercises (Vergnüglichen Etuden) by Werner Thomas-Milfune and you see how ‘real publishing’ and a colourful, shiny cover from a big house can mislead you.

When Nymet Music published Music for a While : A Collection of Piano Pieces (Op. 39) in 2003 it was warmly received. The review in Piano Journal said,

At last, a suite of pieces – each effective enough on its own but even better presented as a whole – which incorporates all the chromatic/ harmonic advances of the century immediately past in pursuit of a genuinely musical objective and with the help of an unerring sense of neo classical form. Having said this, we would still fall short of justice if we didn’t single out for celebration, too, the exquisitely pianistic nature of each of these finely-crafted pieces. They offer an ideal way to teachers and pianists in general for tuning the ear to the harmonic language of our time and for making the transition to the more uncompromising contemporary repertoire. ... For such an accomplished composer, it comes as a surprise to me at not having encountered his name before.

Bower made a notable contribution to modern vocal repertoire including four song-cycles and two song-sets. When countertenor Andrew Watts was asked about the artist who had influenced him the most, his answer included Bower.

"Another person would be Neville Bower, who was a concert pianist. He was head of music at my grammar school. He was very “old school” in his approach. We played piano duets together, he arranged pieces for me; in fact, when he retired and started composing, he wrote several song cycles which were dedicated to me and which I have performed."

=== Recordings and Broadcast ===
Following Bower's retirement from secondary teaching and turn to full-time composition in the 1980s, three of Bowers works were accepted, recorded and broadcast by BBC Radio 3; making his radio debut in his fifties. Evocation (Op. 14) for clarinet and piano was recorded by Jack Brymer and Ian Lake in a programme between Grand duo concertant by Weber and Sonatina by Joseph Horovitz - first broadcast in 1986, and rebroadcast in 1987. Paul Silverthorne and Julian Jacobson recorded Dance of Life (Op. 28) for viola and piano, for a 1990 broadcast alongside a Brahms sonata. Andrew Ball recorded Prism (Op. 33, No. 1) in a programme of modern piano music; alongside works by Gerald Barry, Anthony Payne, and Simon Rowland-Jones - broadcast in 1992.

In 2004 Andrew Watts and Iain Burnside gave a live performance broadcast of The Lamb (Op. 46, No. 2) on BBC Radio 3. Songs of Innocence (Op. 46) features on the album A Countertenor Songbook by Andrew Watts and Iain Burnside, which peaked at No. 8. in the U.K. Classical Music Chart. subsequently Bower's Piping Down the Valley Wild (Op. 46, No. 1) has been broadcast on radio a number of times; including during the programme Essential Classics on BBC Radio 3, and on ABC Classic.

== List of Compositions by Genre ==
=== Choir ===
- Our Lord And Our Lady, Op. 1, No. 1, for choir and piano (words by Hilaire Belloc; 1961)
- The Coming Of Spring, Op. 1, No. 2, for choir and piano (words by Buchanan; 1962)
- Carillion, Carilla, Op. 1, No. 3, For SSS(div.a3)A choir and piano (words by Belloc; 1965)
- Three Songs for Choir, Op. 2 (words by Longfellow; 1958)
  1. Snowflakes
  2. The Poet
  3. Song
- Esmeralda, Op. 5, for choir and percussion (words by Bower; 1958)
- Tu Creasti Domine, Op. 5a, for SSAA Choir (words by Belloc; 1959)
- Wisdom Of Job, Op. 16, for SATB choir (1968)
- Dance A Cachucha, Op. 27, arranged for choir and two pianos (G&S “The Gondoliers”; 1985)
- The Music Makers, Op. 36, for mixed ensemble (flute, B♭ clarinet, horn, piano, violn, viola, and cello) and choir or mixed voices (words by O’Shaughnessy; 1988)
- Psalm 121 : ‘I Will Lift Up Mine Eyes Unto The Hills’, Op. 45, for SSAA boy’s choir (1994)
- Chorale ‘The Call’, Op. 52a, for SATB choir (words by Herbert; 2000)
- Beyond Words, Op. 55, cantata for (div.a3)SATB chorus and orchestra (words by Eric Arthur Knight; 2006)

=== Voice ===
- Meditation (On The Birth Of Jesus), Op. 3, for bass and piano (1958)
- The Golden Sunset, Op. 4, for voice and piano (words by Longfellow; 1958)
- The Dream Follower, Op. 30, song-cycle for countertenor and piano (words by Thomas Hardy; 1986)
  1. The Dream Follower
  2. In the Mind’s Eye
  3. Read by Moonlight
  4. The Sun on the Letter
  5. Two Lips
  6. In Her Precincts
  7. Song of Hope
  8. To Life
  9. I Look Into My Glass.
- Three Songs for a Future Time, Op. 34, song-set for solo voice and piano (1979-87)
  1. Daydream (words by A.S.J. Tessimond, Melody by Hicks)
  2. The Desert (words by Belloc)
  3. Virtue [The Temple] (Words by George Herbert)
- The Path of Dreams, Op. 38, song-set for solo voice (baritone) and piano (1990)
  1. The Path of Dreams (words by Rupert Brooke)
  2. Acknowledgement (words by A.S.J. Tessimond)
  3. Requiscat (words by Oscar Wilde)
- Songs of Innocence, Op. 46, song-cycle for solo voice (mezzo or baritone) and piano (words by Blake; 1994)
  1. Introduction
  2. The Lamb
  3. Nurse’s Song
  4. Infant Joy
  5. A Cradle Song
  6. Spring
  7. The Divine Image
- Songs of Experience, Op. 47, song-cycle for solo voice (mezzo or baritone) and piano (words by Blake; 1994)
  1. Introduction: Hear the Voice of the Bard!
  2. Earth’s Answer
  3. The Clod And The Pebble
  4. A Poison Tree
  5. The Angel
  6. The Garden Of Love
  7. My Pretty Rose Tree
  8. The Sick Rose
  9. The Lily
  10. Ah! Sunflower
- Nightscape : ‘Nightfall in the City of Hyderabad’, Op. 49, for soprano, baritone, B♭ clarinet and piano (words by Naidu; 1996)
- Ghosts And Dreams, Op. 53, song-cycle for solo voice (mezzo or baritone) and piano (words by Hardy; 2000-1)
  1. A Night in November
  2. Something Tapped
  3. The Head Above the Fog
  4. An Upbraiding
  5. A Thought in Two Minds
  6. The Last Performance
  7. The Garden Seat

=== Piano ===
- Three Childrens Pieces, Op. 6, for piano (1959)
  1. Summer Day
  2. Sad Jumbo
  3. Dancing Snowflakes
- Festive Dance, Op. 7, for two pianos (1960)
- Piano Sonata, Op. 8 (1963)
- Holiday Pieces, Op. 10, for young pianists (1965-6)
- Intrada, Op. 11, for solo piano (1966)
- Fantasie-Preludes, Op. 12, for solo piano (1966)
- Escapements, Op. 13, for solo piano (1967)
- Two-Part Inventions, Op. 19 for young pianists (1981)
- Notturno, Op. 20, for piano (1976)
- Events : Music For Classroom Use, Op. 24, for six players on prepared piano (1981-2)
  1. Market Day
  2. The Meet
  3. Insects
  4. Night Music
  5. The Football Match
- Spring Dance, Op. 25a, arranged for two pianos (1974)
- Prism, Op.33, No. 1, soundscape for solo piano (1987)
- Greenscape, Op.33, No. 2, soundscape for solo piano (1987, Revised 2005)
- Llyn Cau, Op.33, No. 3, soundscape for solo piano (1988)
- Five-Finger Colours, Op. 2a, for young pianist (1987-1994)
  1. Purple Piece
  2. Sunlight Piece
  3. Moonlight Piece
  4. The Bells Of Rouen
  5. Snowscape
  6. Sarongen Gamelan
- The Gardens Of Villandry, Op. 40b, arranged for piano (first movement; 2005)
- Music for a While : A collection of piano pieces (Series 1), Op. 39 (1990)
  1. Musing
  2. Parade
  3. Chorale I
  4. Daydream
  5. Spree
  6. Lament
  7. Chorale II
- Colour Studies (Set 1), Op. 41, for solo piano (1992)
  1. Study In Violet
  2. Study In Peacock Blue
  3. Study In Celestial Blue
  4. Study In Indigo
- Colour Studies (Set 2), Op. 42, for solo piano (1992)
  1. Study In Green
  2. Study In Yellow
  3. Study In Orange
  4. Study In Scarlet
- Colour Studies (Set 3), Op. 43, for solo piano (1992)
  1. Study In Black (“Kali”)
  2. Study In Grey : Fugue In 3 Voices (“Greybeards In Bowlers”)
  3. Study In Brown
  4. Study In White (“Toccata”)
- Meditations, Op. 44, for solo piano (1993-4)
  1. Moderato Tranquillo
  2. Andante Sostenuto
  3. Sostenuto Moderato
  4. Pastorale Patetico
  5. Evocation
  6. Moderato Assai
- Lament For Bosnia, Op. 44a, for solo piano (1993)
- Why?, Op. 44b, for solo piano (1993)
- Music for a While : A collection of piano pieces (Series 2), Opus 48 (1995-6)
  1. Fairly Fast And Light
  2. ‘Hymnus’
  3. Andante con moto
  4. “Nathan’s Blues” Fairly slowly
  5. ‘Chorale’ Moderato
  6. ‘Tôdi’ (Raga) Andante ritmico
  7. “Ay Allah” Vivo, ma non troppo
  8. ‘Epilogue’ Lento, tranquillo
- Music for a While : A collection of piano pieces (Series 3), Op. 54 (2005)
  1. Prelude
  2. Ballad
  3. Song And Dance
- Scènes De La Ballerine : Music For Three Contrasting Dances, Op. 56, for piano (2007)
  1. Tempo alla marcia, con brio
  2. “Adage” Adagietto sostenuto
  3. ‘Valse’ Brisk, but not too fast

=== Chamber & Small Ensemble ===
- Sonata for oboe and piano, Op. 9 (1966)
- Evocation, Op. 14, sound-piece for clarinet and piano (1969, revised 1981)
- Nta Villie Valli, Op. 17, for oboe and piano (Sicilian folk song; 1972)
- String Quartet “Dance Quartet”, Op. 22 (1979)
- Popular Song from Walton’s “Facade”, Op. 26, arrange for oboe, clarinet and piano (1981)
- Dance Of Life, Op. 28, sound-piece for viola and piano (1986)
- Ecstasy, Op. 29, sound-piece for cello and piano (1985)
- Glory, Op. 31, Sound-Piece For Trumpet and piano (1985-6)
- Eternal, Op. 32, chorale and fugue for organ (1987)
- The Music Makers, Op. 36, for mixed ensemble (flute, B♭ clarinet, horn, piano, violn, viola, and cello) and choir or mixed voices (words by O’Shaughnessy; 1988)
- Sections, Op. 37, for solo flute (1988)
- Nightscape : ‘Nightfall in the City of Hyderabad’, Op. 49, for soprano, baritone, B♭ clarinet and piano (words by Naidu; 1996)
- Sonata : Soundscape For Vincent, Op. 51, for violin and piano (edited by Lydia Mordkovitch; 1999)
- Beatitude and Chorale, Op. 52, for organ (2000)

=== Orchestra & Large Ensemble ===
- Concertante, Op. 15, for oboe and orchestra (1971, Revised 1986)
- Concerto, Op. 18, for trumpet and orchestra (1973-4)
- Processional March, Op. 21, for school orchestra (1976)
- Two Pieces, Op. 23, for school orchestra (1979)
  1. Gymnopedie (Satie arr. Bower)
  2. “Valse”
- Spring Dance, Op. 25, for orchestra (1981)
- Prelude And Threnody, Op. 35, for double string orchestra (1989)
- The Gardens Of Villandry, Op. 40, soundscape for orchestra (1991-2)
- Naini, Op. 50, for large orchestra (1996-after 2003)
- Beyond Words, Op. 55, cantata for (div.a3)SATB chorus and orchestra (words by Eric Arthur Knight; 2006)
- Tal, Op. 57, for large orchestra (after 2003; incomplete companion of Naini, Op. 50)

=== Nathan Bowness’ Nom De Plume ===
- Brazilian Street Song : “Choros” for 2-part descant recorder band (1994) or 2 solo descant recorders & piano (with optional percussion)
