= Polly Shah =

Pakistani Air Commodore (1926–2013)

Air Commodore Polly Shah SQA
- پولی شاہ

Personal details
- Born: Syed Mansoor Ahmad Shah; 11 March 1926 British India
- Died: 7 February 2013 (aged 86) Karachi, Pakistan
- Children: 3
- Education: Sherwood College; St. Anthony High School, Lahore; Government College, Lahore (dropped out, joined RIAF); Air Command and Staff College

Military service
- Branch/service: Royal Indian Air Force (1945-1947); Pakistan Air Force (1947-1972)
- Years of service: 1945-1972
- Rank: Air Commodore
- Commands: No. 12 Squadron PAF; PAF Station Chaklala; PAF Station Peshawar; PAF Station Masroor
- Battles/wars: India–Pakistan war of 1947–1948; India-Pakistan war of 1965; India-Pakistan air war of 1965; India-Pakistan war of 1971
- Awards: See list

Syed Mansoor Ahmad Shah (Note: Urdu: سید منصور احمد شاہ) (11 March 1926 – 7 February 2013) also known as Polly Shah and SMA Shah, was among the pioneer officers of the Pakistan Air Force, a military strategist, fighter pilot and Air Commodore. He was also an author and published a memoir about his career titled "The Gold Bird: Pakistan and Its Air Force, Observations of a Pilot" in 2002.

== Early life ==
Syed Mansoor Ahmad Shah was born on 11 March 1926 to Major Dr. Habibullah Khan and Captain Dr Enid Flora Shah, their only son.

Shah received his early schooling at Sherwood College and St. Anthony High School, Lahore. He became the first Muslim from the Punjab Province (British India) to have topped the Senior Cambridge examination in 1943.

While at the Government College, Lahore, he joined the Royal Indian Air Force.

== Personal life ==
Shah had two sisters.

Shah married Sibiha in 1951, and they had three children, two daughters: Farida and Sonia, and a son, Daud Shah.

== Service years ==
=== Royal Indian Air Force (1945-1947) ===
Syed Mansoor Ahmad Shah was commissioned into the Royal Indian Air Force on 9 April 1945 as part of the 31 Pilot Course and subsequently proceeded to No. 1 (Indian) Service Flying Training School RAF until 30 July 1945 for advanced training. The pilots also attended the 44 Fighter Course at No. 151 Operational Training Unit from 15 August to 30 November 1945. He also won the Best Flying Progress Trophy.

Flying Officer Shah was attached to No. 12 Sqn RIAF as a squadron pilot from 15 February 1946 to 29 August 1947.

=== Pakistan Air Force (1947-1972) ===
Following the Partition of British India in August 1947, Flying Officer Shah opted for the Royal Pakistan Air Force. He flew the first sortie in the India–Pakistan war of 1947–1948 and was described as the "opening batsman" of the war by fellow pilot Sajad Haider.

He attended the Air Command and Staff College and received the Air University Badge in December 1956.

In April 1958, Wg Cdr Shah was appointed Officer Commanding No. 12 Sqn. He was then appointed Director of Training in January 1960. He later served as Commander PAF Station Chaklala in January 1963. He was appointed Assistant Chief of Air Staff (Training) in November 1965, commanded PAF Station Peshawar in July 1967 and PAF Station Masroor in May 1968. He assumed the role of Assistant Chief of Air Staff (Operations) in April 1970, a position he held until January 1971, when he was succeeded by Air Vice Marshal Zafar Chaudhry. He was reappointed to the same role in August 1971.

He was also chosen to command PAF Base Dacca in November 1971 but suspended flights between East and West Pakistan prevented his appointment and he continued to serve in his previous role. He was among three officers who were in the race to become the next Chief of Air Staff in 1972. However, when President Zulfikar Ali Bhutto reorganised the Pakistan Armed Forces, Shah was among 43 officers who were retired.

== Later life ==
After retiring, Shah joined Agricultural Aviation, a crop spraying company and worked there for the next 10 years.

== Death ==
He died on 7 February 2013, at the age of 87.

== Published work ==
Mansoor Shah (2002). The Gold Bird: Pakistan and Its Air Force, Observations of a Pilot. Oxford University Press.

== Awards and decorations ==
- Best Flying Progress Trophy, Royal Indian Air Force, 1945
- Air University Badge, Air Command and Staff College, December 1956
- Commendation Certificate by the Commander-in-Chief, 1956
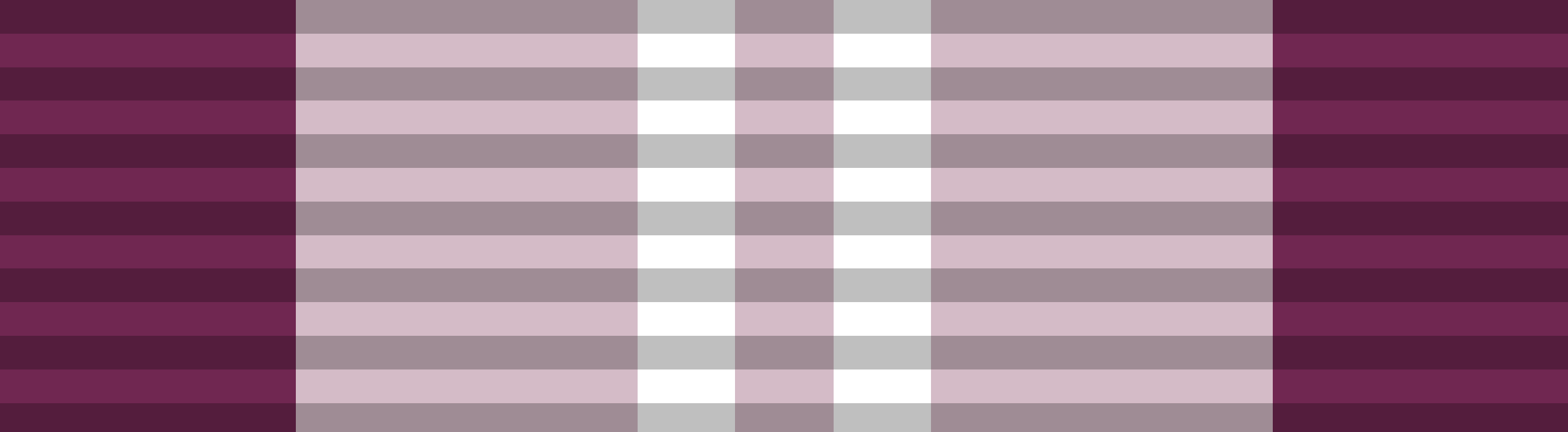
- Sitara-e-Quaid-e-Azam, 1970
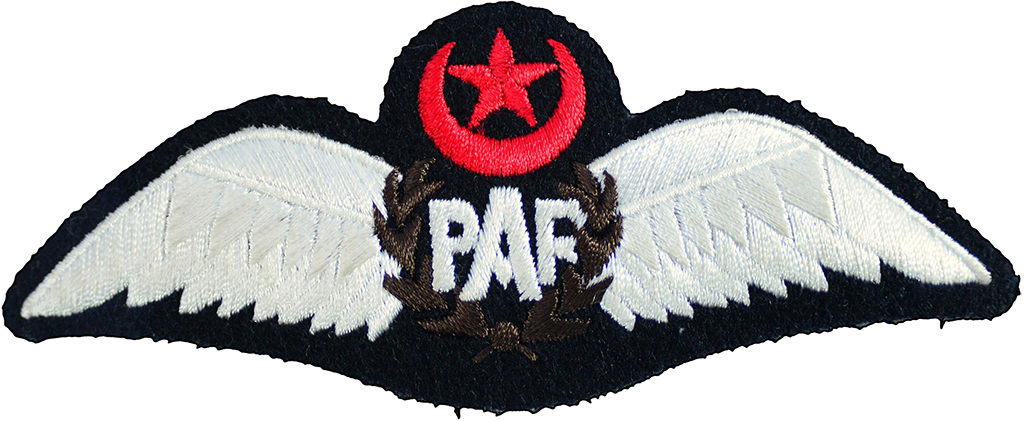
- PAF GD(P) Badge RED (More than 3000 Flying Hours)
