= Kaleem Omar =

Pakistani writer (1937–2009)

Kaleem Omar (KO) (1937 – 25 June 2009) was a Pakistani journalist, and an English language poet.

== Life ==
Born in Lucknow, Omar attended Sherwood College, Naini Tal. He was associated with the Jang Group's daily The News International, in Karachi for the past many years. From 1983 to 1988, he wrote a column for The Star Weekend; beginning in 1989, he wrote for The News.

His work is included in the anthologies Pieces of eight, Wordfall and A Dragonfly in the Sun.

Kaleem Omar died of heart failure on 28 June 2009.
