= Nandini Sahu =

Indian poet, writer and critic

Vice-Chancellor at Hindi University, Howrah
- Incumbent
- Assumed office 22 December 2024
- Preceded by: Vijay Kumar Bharti

Professor at Indira Gandhi National Open University
- Incumbent
- Assumed office 2006

Personal details
- Born: 23 July 1973 (age 53) G. Udayagiri, Orissa, India
- Education: Visva-Bharati University
- Occupation: Writer, poet, critic
- Profession: Professor

Nandini Sahu (born 23 July 1973) is an Indian poet and creative writer.

In 2025, she is the Vice Chancellor, Hindi University, West Bengal. She is also Ex-Director, School of Foreign Languages and professor of English at Indira Gandhi National Open University [IGNOU], New Delhi. Her areas of research interest cover Indian Literature, New Literatures, Folklore and Culture Studies, American Literature, Children’s Literature and Critical Theory. She is the Chief Editor/Founder Editor of Interdisciplinary Journal of Literature and Language(IJLL), and Panorama Literaria, both bi-annual peer-reviewed journals in English. She is also professor of English at the Indira Gandhi National Open University, New Delhi, India. She has written several books including poetry in English. Her poetry has been published in India, US, UK, Africa and Pakistan. She has won three gold medals in English literature and also the award of All India Poetry Contest in 1993 at Saint Xavier College, Ranchi and Shiksha Ratna Purashkar. She is also editor in chief of Interdisciplinary Journal of Literature and Language

== Early life ==
Sahu was born on 23 July 1973 in G. Udayagiri in Orissa, India. Her parents were teachers in Indian local schools. She and her five sisters grew up in an obedience life. She accomplished her doctorate in English literature under the guidance of Niranjan Mohanty, Professor of English, Visva Bharati, Santiniketan. She is also obtaining D.Litt, on Native American Literature. She is serving as Professor of English language at the Indira Gandhi National Open University, New Delhi. She has also attended national seminars.

== Literary career ==
Sahu has written several books including poetry collections. Her writings are based on the subjects of Indian-English Literature, American Literature, English Language Teaching (ELT), Folklore and Culture Studies and also Children's literature. The Hindi Translator Dinesh Kumar Mali had translated her poetry Sita in Hindi, her representative poems as well as her stories. She has designed and developed programmes on Folklore and Culture studies for IGNOU. She is also the editor-in-chief of Interdisciplinary Journal of Literature And Language, New Delhi. Moreover, Sahu has delivered lectures on various subjects in India and abroad.

== Awards ==
- Award of All India Poetry Contest
- Award of Shiksha Ratna Purashkar
- Three Gold Medals in English literature
- Poiesis Award of Honor-2015
- Buddha Creative Writers’ Award
- The Gold Medal from the Vice-President of India for her contribution to English Studies in India.

== Publications ==
Sahu’s works include;

=== Selected works ===
- The Other Voice, a collection of poems, 2004
- The Silence, 2005
- Silver Poems on My Lips, 2009
- Sukamaa and Other Poems Published by The Poetry Society of India, Gurgaon ISBN 978-81-925839-2-1
- Suvarnarekha : An anthology of Indian women poets
- Sita (A Poem)
- Dynamics of Children’s Literature
- Zero Point
- Re-reading Jayanta Mahapatra: Selected Poems_
- सीता महाकाव्य: हिन्दी अनुवाद_
- A Song Half & Half_
- Shedding-Metaphors_
- Medusa (2025)

=== Critical books ===
- Recollection as Redemption, 2004
- Post Modernist Delegations in English Language Teaching: The Quixotic Deluge, 2005
- The Post Colonial Space: Writing the Self and The Nation, 2008
- Folklore and the Alternative Modernities(Vol I & II), 2012

== See also ==
- List of Indian poets
- List of Indian writers
- List of women writers
