= 66th Armoured Regiment (India) =

Indian Army regiment

- Cap Badge of 66th Armoured Regiment
- Active: 1966 – present
- Country: India
- Allegiance: India
- Branch: Indian Army
- Type: Armour
- Size: Regiment
- Nickname: "Flame Riders"
- Mottos: "मान या वीरगति"; Maan ya Veergati (Honour or Valiant Death)
- Colors: Flame Orange and Charcoal Grey
- March: Sare Jahan Se Achha Hindustan Hamara
- Equipment: T-72
- Decorations: Shaurya Chakra 1 Vir Chakra 1 Sena Medal 1 Mentioned in dispatches 3 COAS Commendation Cards 9 VCOAS Commendation Cards 2 GOC-in-C Commendation Cards 22; Jeevan Raksha Padak 1
- Battle honours: Theatre honour "Punjab 1971"

Commanders
- Colonel of the Regiment: Lieutenant General Vivek Kashyap
- Notable commanders: General Vishwa Nath Sharma, PVSM, AVSM, ADC

Insignia
- Abbreviation: 66 Armd Regt

66th Armoured Regiment is an armoured regiment which is part of the Armoured Corps of the Indian Army.

== Formation ==
The regiment was raised on 1 September 1966 by Lieutenant Colonel (later Major General) Narinder Singh at Ahmednagar as the "66th Cavalry". The name was changed on 14 January 1967 to 66th Armoured Regiment. The first officers for the regiment came from the Armoured Corps, but the Junior Commissioned Officers and men were drawn from the Regiment of Artillery. The Regiment broke new ground by recruiting Ahirs and Marathas, classes which had not previously served in the Armoured Corps. It also started inducting South Indians from 1968. Unlike other regiments, there are no single-class squadrons, but classes mixed right down to tank troop level.

== Equipment ==
The regiment was raised with Sherman tanks and re-equipped in November 1969 with Vijayanta tanks. In 1987, the Regiment converted to T-72 tanks.

== Operations ==
The 66th Armoured Regiment fought in the Indo-Pakistani War of 1971 as the integral armoured regiment of the 15th Infantry Division (XI Corps). For its performance in operations, it was awarded the theatre honour "Punjab 1971". After the war, the 66th participated in full strength in the Republic Day Parade of 26 January 1972, which was the victory parade to commemorate India's victory in the 1971 war. The regiment has also participated in Operation Trident, Operation Vijay, Operation Parakram and in counter insurgency operations.

The Regiment again took part in the Republic Day Parade in 1991 with its newly acquired T-72 tanks.

== Presentation of Guidon and Standard ==
On 6 November 1979, the Regiment became the youngest to be presented with the "Guidon" by the then President of India Mr Neelam Sanjiva Reddy. On 6 December 2004, the Chief of Army Staff General Nirmal Chander Vij presented the "Standard" to the Regiment to commemorate the Regiment's 38 years of dedicated service to the nation and valour of the 1971 War.

== Notable personnel ==
One of the commandants of the regiment, Lt Col Vishwa Nath Sharma, went on to become the Chief of the Army Staff from 1988 to 1990.

== Regimental Insignia ==
The regiment cap badge depicts a Vijayanta tank within a diamond-shaped tank troop formation sign and is devoid of the national emblem, the regiment number or the regimental motto.

The shoulder title consists of the numeral "66" within a diamond-shaped tank troop formation sign in brass. The Regimental colours are ‘Flame Orange and Charcoal Grey’, which signify qualities of ‘strength and resilience’.

The Regimental Motto is मान या वीरगति (Maan Ya Veergati), which translates to "Honour or Valiant Death".

The regiment has gained notoriety for adopting the Death's Head emblem to emblazon their tanks, despite official disapproval. The death's head has a scroll with the regimental motto inscribed. The death's head motif (in silver plate) is used as the officer's pouch badge. The emblem very closely resembles that of the 17th/21st Lancers, an erstwhile cavalry regiment of the British Army from 1922 to 1993.
