= Surindra Nath Sharma =

Indian Army general

Lieutenant General Surindra Nath Sharma PVSM AVSM
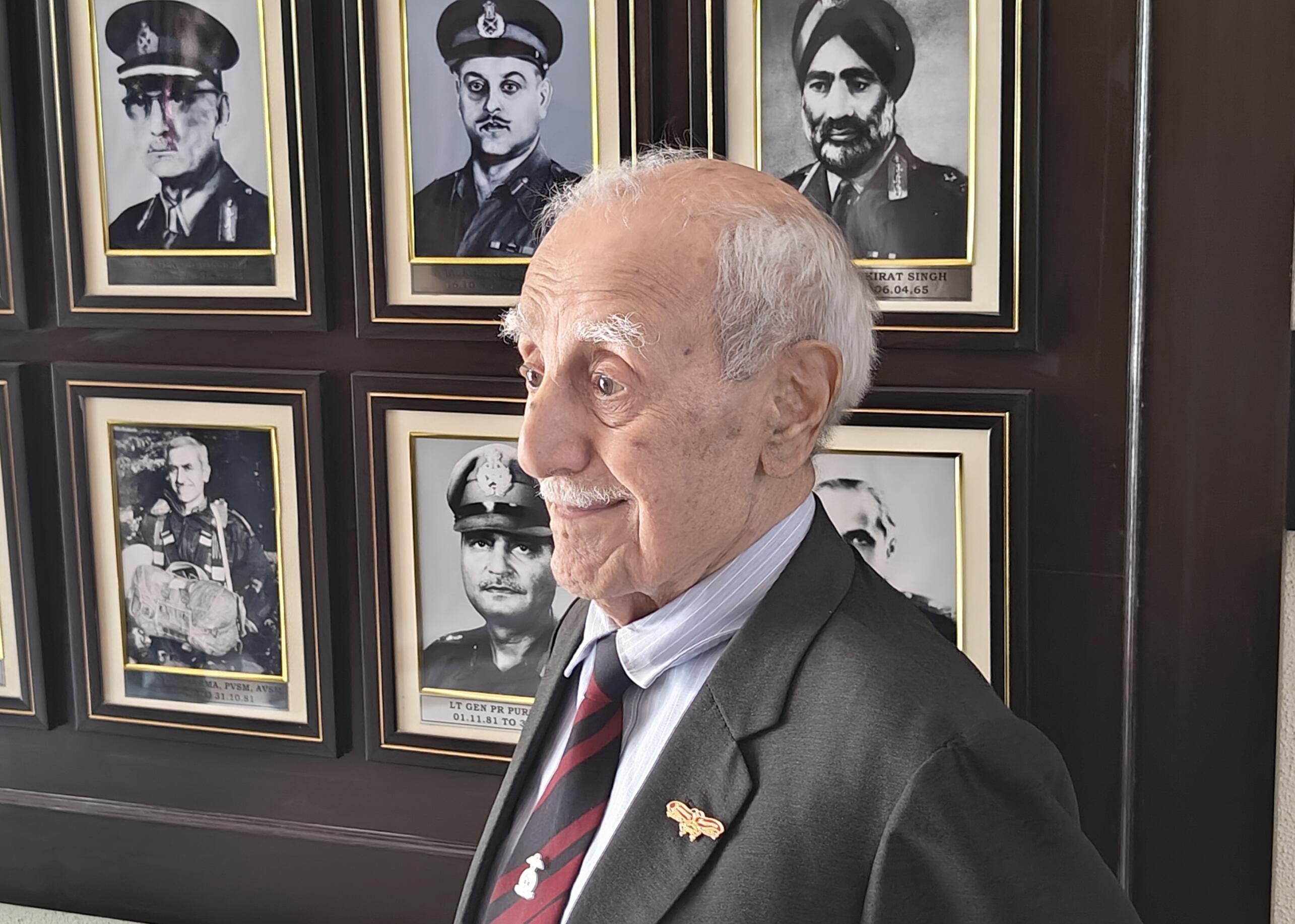
- Lt Gen Surindra Nath Sharma, PVSM, AVSM, (retd), standing in front of his photograph as a parachute-wearing Engineer-in-Chief of the Indian Army.
- Born: 3 October 1923 (age 103)
- Military career
- Allegiance: British India; India
- Branch: British Indian Army; Indian Army
- Service years: 1944–1981
- Rank: Lieutenant General
- Service number: IC-1475
- Units: Madras Sappers; Bengal Sappers; 20 Field Company Bombay Sappers
- Commands: Indian Army Corps of Engineers
- Conflicts: World War II; Indo-Pakistani War of 1971
- Awards: Param Vishisht Seva Medal; Ati Vishisht Seva Medal

Lieutenant General Surindra Nath Sharma PVSM AVSM (born 3 October 1923) is a retired Indian Army general and military engineer who last served as engineer-in-chief of the Indian Army.

== Career ==
Sharma was commissioned into the Madras Sappers of the Indian Army Corps of Engineers, then the engineering corps of the British Indian Army, in October 1944. Transferring to the Bengal Sappers, he was attached to 2nd Field Company in 1945–1946. He further qualified as a paratrooper and following Indian independence and partition, was posted to the 20th Field Company of the Bombay Sappers, subsequently commanding the 411 Parachute Field Company of the Parachute Brigade. Sharma then served as adjutant of the training battalion of the Bombay Sappers for three months in 1948 before receiving a posting as a Group Task Officer with a services selection board, returning as adjutant of the training battalion in 1950.

On 15 January 1964, Sharma was appointed a military attaché to the High Commission of India in Australia, with the local rank of colonel. He served in this capacity until 14 April 1967. On 8 May 1970, he was appointed Chief Engineer, Northern Zone with the acting rank of brigadier, and was awarded the Ati Vishisht Seva Medal (AVSM) in the 1971 Republic Day decorations list.

On 21 August 1973, Sharma was appointed Chief Engineer, Eastern Command. In 1979, he was appointed Engineer-in-Chief of the Indian Army, and was awarded the Param Vishisht Seva Medal (PVSM) in the 1981 Republic Day decorations list. Sharma retired from the army on 31 October 1981 after 42 years of service; in the final two days of his active service, he conducted parachute jumps in Agra with the Para Field Company, and on his final day of active duty, instead of attending his farewell ceremony in Delhi, elected for a parachute jump. Remaining an avid parachutist well into his retirement, Sharma conducted his last jump at the age of 86.

== Personal life ==
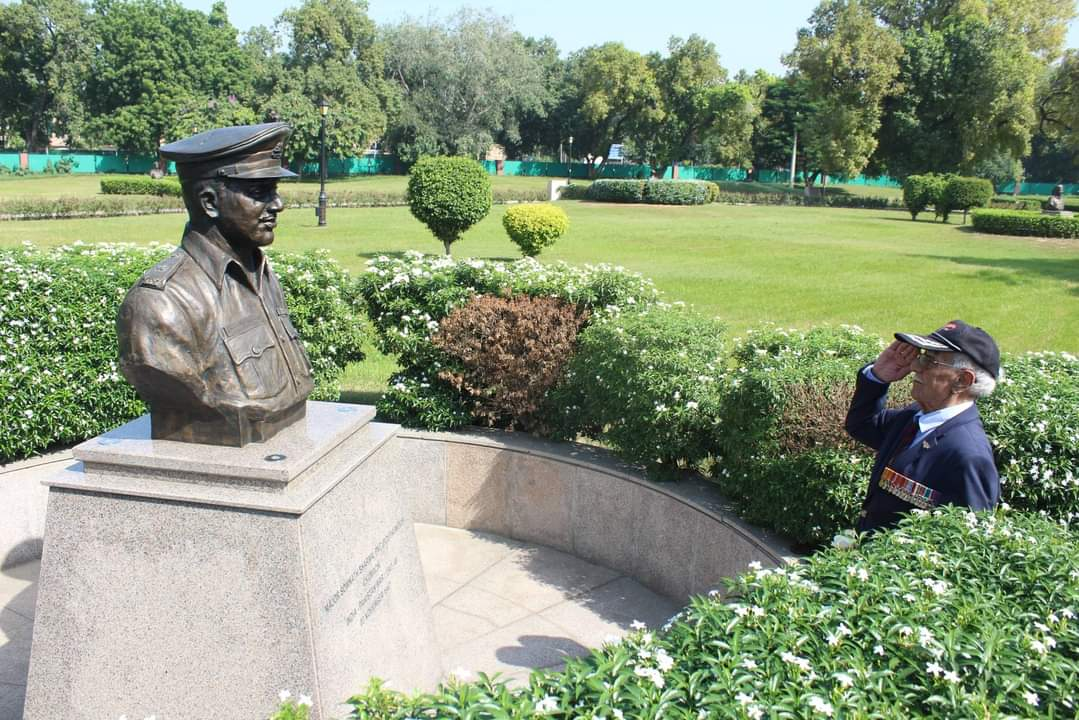
Sharma in October 2023, saluting a memorial to his elder brother, Major Somnath Sharma.

Sharma is the second son of Major General Amar Nath Sharma, a military doctor who retired as Director Medical Services (Army). His elder brother, Major Somnath Sharma, was the first recipient and first posthumous recipient of the Param Vir Chakra (PVC), the highest Indian military decoration. His younger brother General Vishwa Nath Sharma also achieved flag rank, serving as Chief of the Army Staff from 1988 to 1990, while a sister, Major Kamla Tiwari, followed her father into the Indian Army Medical Corps. Another sister, Manorama Sharma, was an educationist and social worker. They all belong to district Kangra, Himachal Pradesh.

Sharma is married. He turned 100 in October 2023.

== Dates of rank ==
Insignia	Rank	Component	Date of rank
	Second Lieutenant	British Indian Army	4 August 1944 (emergency); 1946 (substantive)
	Lieutenant	British Indian Army	4 February 1947
	Lieutenant	Indian Army	15 August 1947 (Note: Upon independence in 1947, India became a Dominion within the British Commonwealth of Nations. As a result, the rank insignia of the British Army, incorporating the Tudor Crown and four-pointed Bath Star ("pip"), was retained, as George VI remained Commander-in-Chief of the Indian Armed Forces. After 26 January 1950, when India became a republic, the President of India became Commander-in-Chief, and the Ashoka Lion replaced the crown, with a five-pointed star being substituted for the "pip.")
	Lieutenant	Indian Army	26 January 1950 (recommissioning and change in insignia)
	Captain	Indian Army	4 August 1951
	Major	Indian Army	4 August 1958
	Lieutenant-Colonel	Indian Army	9 June 1965
	Colonel	Indian Army	
	Brigadier	Indian Army	30 April 1969
	Major General	Indian Army	1 October 1974 (seniority from 28 December 1973)
	Lieutenant General	Indian Army	1979
