= Somnath Sharma =

First recipient of the Param Vir Chakra

Major Somnath Sharma PVC
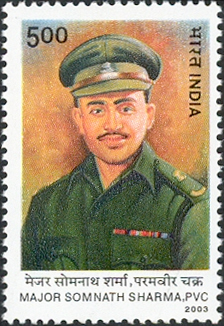
- Major Somnath Sharma on a 2003 stamp of India
- Born: 31 January 1923; Dadh, Kangra district, Punjab Province, British India (present-day Himachal Pradesh, India)
- Died: 3 November 1947 (aged 24); Badgam, Jammu and Kashmir, Dominion of India
- Relatives: General V. N. Sharma (brother)
- Military career
- Allegiance: British India; India
- Branch: British Indian Army; Indian Army
- Service years: 1942–1947
- Rank: Major
- Service number: IC-521
- Unit: 4th Battalion, Kumaon Regiment
- Conflicts: Second World War; Arakan campaign; Indo-Pakistani War of 1947; Battle of Badgam †
- Awards: Param Vir Chakra; Mentioned in despatches

Major Somnath Sharma, PVC (31 January 1923 – 3 November 1947), was an Indian military officer and the first recipient of India's highest military decoration, the Param Vir Chakra (PVC), which he was awarded posthumously.

Sharma was commissioned into the 4th Battalion, 19th Hyderabad Regiment, in 1942. He served in Burma during the Arakan Campaign in World War II, for which he was mentioned in dispatches. In the Indo-Pakistani War of 1947–1948, he was killed in action on 3 November 1947 while repelling Pakistani infiltrators near Srinagar Airport. For his gallantry and sacrifice during the Battle of Badgam, he was posthumously awarded the Param Vir Chakra.

== Early life and education ==
Sharma was born in a Dogra Brahmin family on 31 January 1923 at Dadh, Kangra, Punjab (present-day Himachal Pradesh). His father, Amar Nath Sharma, was a military officer. (Note: He retired as a major general while serving as "Director Medical Services, Army".) Several of his siblings serve in the military. (Note: His brothers were Lieutenant General Surindra Nath Sharma (retired as engineer-in-chief) and General Vishwa Nath Sharma (Chief of the Army Staff, 1988-1990). His sisters were Major Kamla Tewari (medical doctor) and second sister, Mrs Manorama Sharma, educationist and social worker.) His younger brother, Vishwa Nath Sharma, would later become the 14th Chief of the Army Staff of the Indian Army. Somnath Sharma completed his schooling at Sherwood College, Nainital, before enrolling at the Prince of Wales Royal Military College in Dehradun. He later studied at the Royal Military College, Sandhurst. During his childhood, Somnath was influenced by the teachings of Krishna and Arjuna in the Bhagavad Gita, taught to him by his grandfather.

== Military career ==
On 22 February 1942, upon his graduation from the Royal Military College, Sharma was commissioned into the 9th Battalion, 19th Hyderabad Regiment, of the British Indian Army (later to become the Indian Army's 4th Battalion, Kumaon Regiment). During World War II, he saw action against the Japanese in Burma during the Arakan Campaign. At that time he served under the command of Colonel K. S. Thimmayya, who would later rise to the rank of general and become Chief of the Army Staff from 1957 to 1961. Sharma was mentioned in despatches for his actions during the fighting of the Arakan Campaign. The award was gazetted in January 1946.

Throughout his military career, Sharma was influenced by his uncle Captain K. D. Vasudeva's gallantry in action. Vasudeva also served with the 8th Battalion, participating in the Malayan Campaign during which he died aiding hundreds of soldiers under his command to survive from the Japanese offensive.

=== Battle of Badgam ===
On 27 October 1947, a contingent of troops of the Indian Army was air-lifted into Srinagar in response to the invasion by Pakistan on 22 October into the Kashmir Valley(sonmarg). On 31 October, D Company of 4th Battalion of Kumaon Regiment, under the command of Sharma, was flown in to Srinagar. During this time, his left hand was in a plaster cast as a result of injuries sustained previously on the hockey field, but he insisted on being with his company in combat and was subsequently given permission to go.

On 3 November, a batch of three companies was deployed to the Badgam area on patrol duties. Their objective was to check the infiltrators moving toward Srinagar city area from the north. As there was no enemy movement, two of the three deployed companies returned to Srinagar at 2:00 pm. However, Sharma's D Company, was ordered to stay in position until 3:00 pm. At 2:35 pm, Sharma's company was fired upon from the local resident houses in Badgam but counter-fire was not ordered to avoid injuring or killing innocent civilians. Suddenly, a tribal lashkar (English: militiamen) of 700 infiltrators approached the Badgam from the direction of Gulmarg. D Company was soon surrounded from three sides and sustained heavy casualties from mortar fire. Sharma realized the importance of holding onto his position as both the city of Srinagar and the airport would be vulnerable if lost. Under heavy fire, and outnumbered by a ratio of seven to one, he urged his company to fight bravely, often exposing himself to the enemy fire as he ran from one post to the other.

When heavy casualties adversely affected the company's firing power, Sharma took upon himself the task of distributing ammunition to his men, operating light machine guns. While busy fighting the infiltrators, a mortar shell exploded on a pile of ammunition near him. Before he succumbed to his injuries, he transmitted a message to his brigade's headquarters which read:

"The enemies are only 50 yards from us. We are heavily outnumbered. We are under devastating fire. I shall not withdraw an inch but will fight to our last man and our last round."

— Major Somanth Sharma, Battle of Badgam, 1947 GOPAL SHARMA,

By the time a relief company, from the 1st Battalion of the Kumaon Regiment, reached Badgam, the position held by Sharma's company had been overrun. However, the 200 casualties suffered by the tribal infiltrators caused them to lose the impetus to advance. This bought time for Indian forces to fly into Srinagar airfield and block all routes of ingress to Srinagar itself. During the battle, along with Sharma, one junior commissioned officer and 20 other ranks of D company were killed in action. Sharma's body was recovered three days later. Though it was disfigured beyond recognition, his body was identified by means of the leather holster of his pistol and a few pages of Bhagavad Gita in his chest pocket.

=== Receiving the Param Vir Chakra ===
On 21 June 1950, Somnath Sharma's award of the Param Vir Chakra, for his actions on 3 November 1947 in defending the Srinagar airport, was gazetted. This was the first time the honour had been awarded since its inception. Coincidentally, Savitri Khanolkar, the mother-in-law of Sharma's brother, was the designer of the Param Vir Chakra.

The official citation reads:

On 3 November 1947, Major Somnath Sharma's company was ordered on a fighting patrol to Badgam in the Kashmir Valley . He reached his objective at first light on 3 November and took up a position south of Badgam at 11:00 hours. The enemy, estimated at about 500 attacked his company position from three sides; the company began to sustain heavy casualties. Fully realizing the gravity of the situation and the direct threat that would result to both the aerodrome and Srinagar via Hum Hom, Major Somnath Sharma urged his company to fight the enemy tenaciously. With extreme bravery he kept rushing across the open ground to his sections exposing himself to heavy and accurate fire to urge them to hold on. Keeping his nerve, he skilfully directed the fire of his sections into the ever-advancing enemy. He repeatedly exposed himself to the full fury of enemy fire and laid out cloth strips to guide our aircraft onto their targets in full view of the enemy. Realising that casualties had affected the effectiveness of his light automatics, this officer whose left hand was in plaster, personally commenced filling magazines and issuing them to the light machine gunners. A mortar shell landed right in the middle of the ammunition resulting in an explosion that killed him. Major Sharma's company held on to this position and the remnants withdrew only when almost completely surrounded. His inspiring example resulted in the enemy being delayed for six hours, thus gaining time for our reinforcements to get into position at Hum Hom to stem the tide of the enemy advance. His leadership, gallantry and tenacious defence were such that his men were inspired to fight the enemy by seven to one, six hours after this gallant officer had been killed. He has set an example of courage and qualities seldom equalled in the history of the Indian Army. His last message to the Brigade Headquarters a few moments before he was killed was, 'the enemy are only 50 yards from us. We are heavily outnumbered. We are under devastating fire. I shall not withdraw an inch but will fight to the last man and the last round.'

— Gazette Notification: 2 Pres/50, 21.6.50,

== Legacy ==
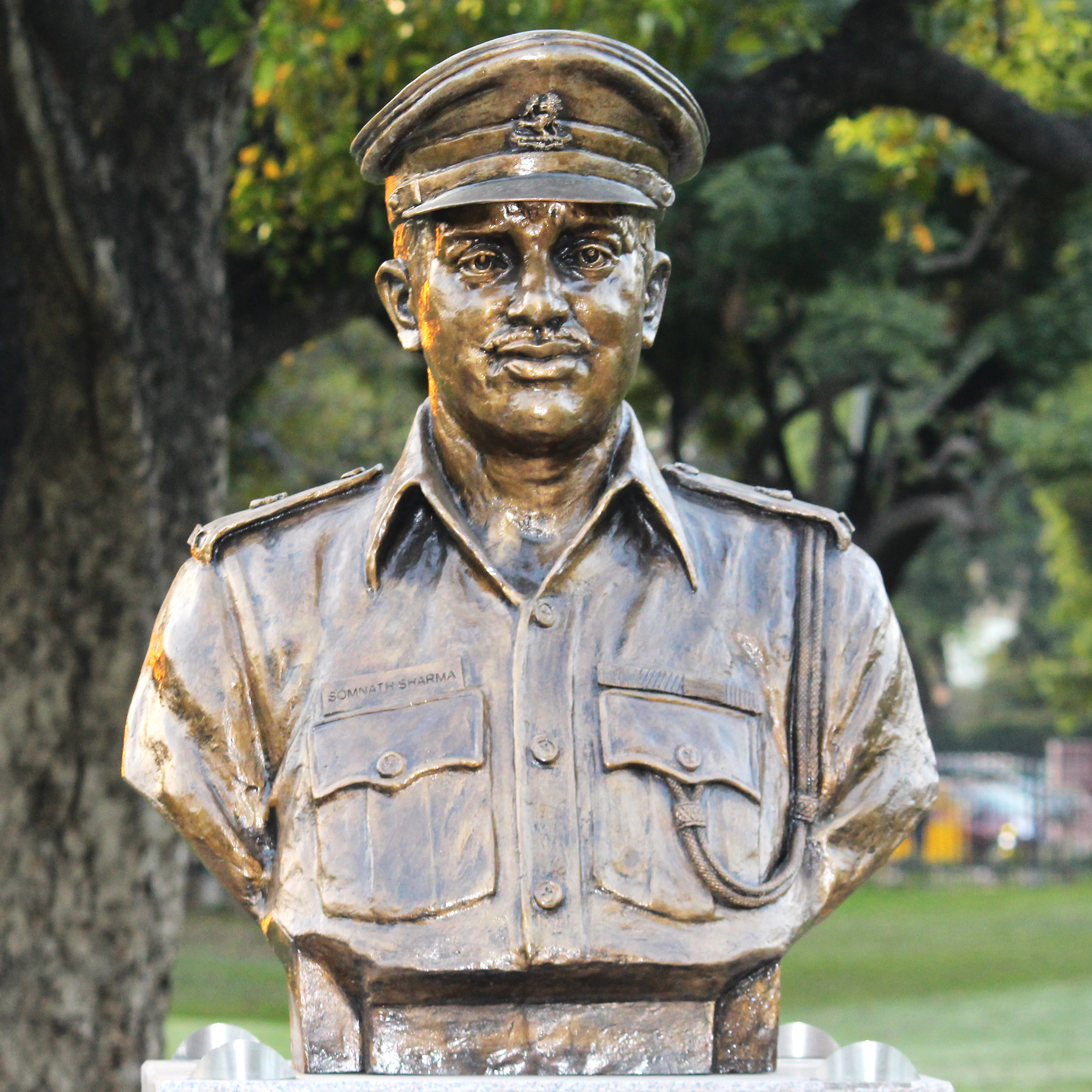
Sharma's statue at Param Yodha Sthal, National War Memorial, New Delhi

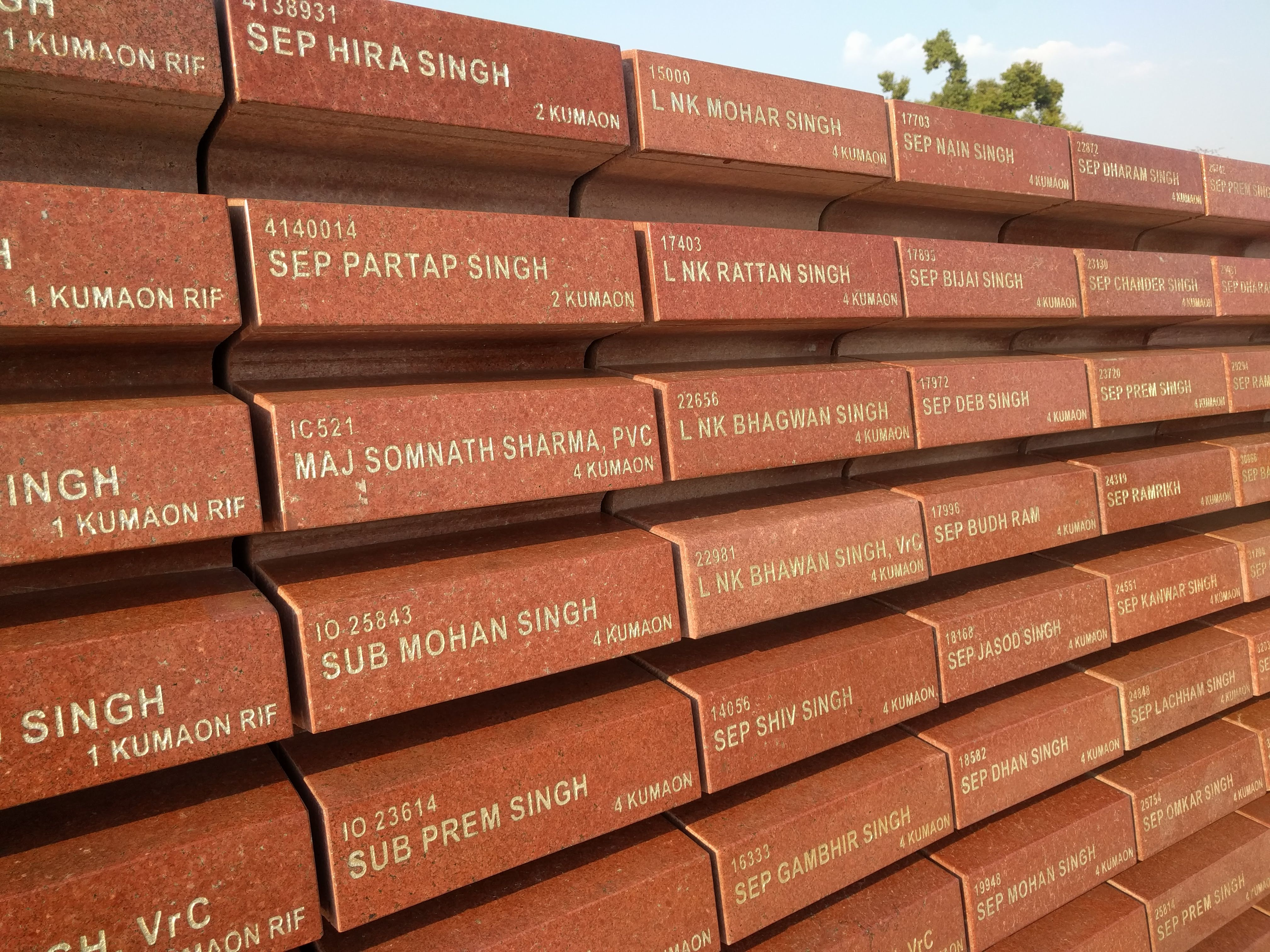
Major Somnath Sharma's name on the Tyag Chakra (Circle of Sacrifice), National War Memorial, India.

In the 1980s, the Shipping Corporation of India (SCI), a Government of India enterprise under the aegis of the Ministry of Shipping, named fifteen of their crude oil tankers in honour of the Param Vir Chakra recipients. The crude oil tanker named MT Major Somnath Sharma, PVC was delivered to SCI on 11 June 1984. The tanker was phased out after 25 years service.

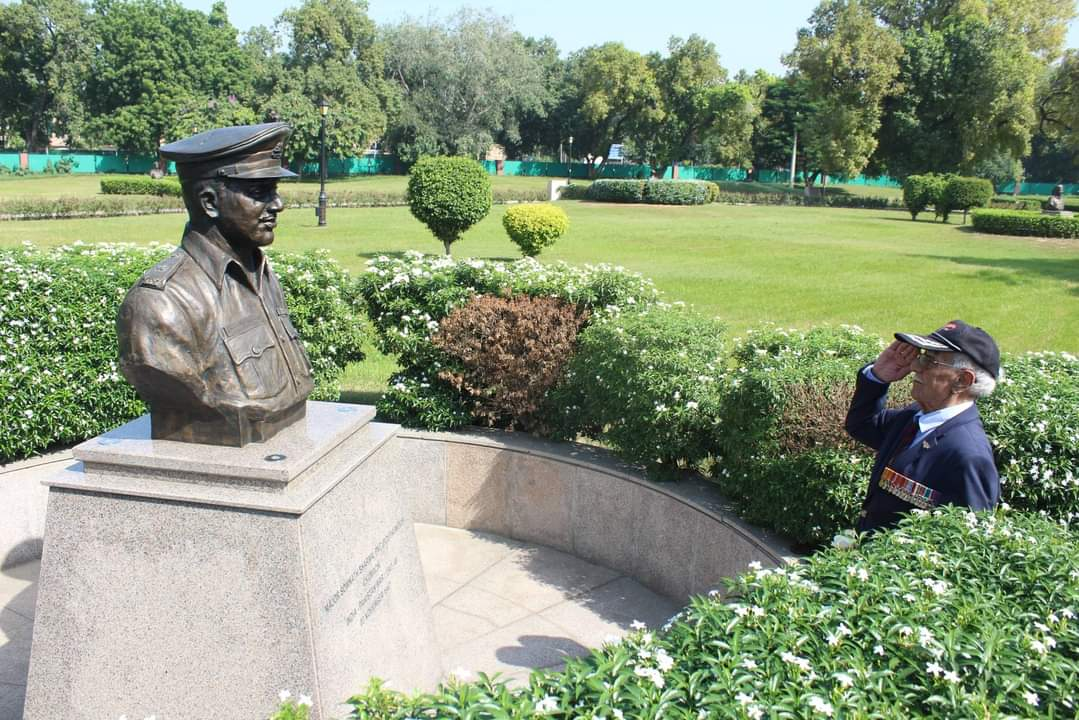
On turning 100, Lt Gen Surindra Nath Sharma (Retd) salutes his brother late Major Somnath Sharma, PVC.

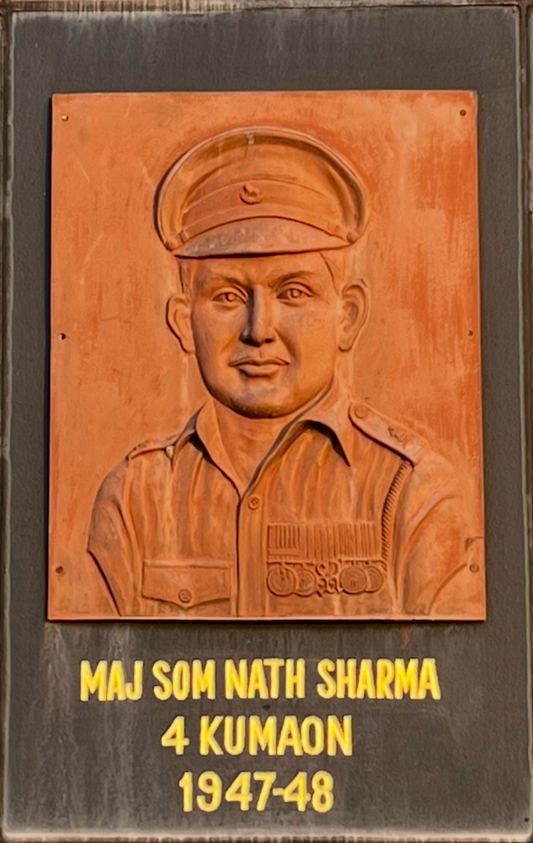
Relief Mural at Balidan Stambh

Balidan Stambh, the war memorial in Jammu, paid tribute to him by inscribing his name on the semi-circular pillars for the martyrs of the 1947-48 war. His name is also displayed near the Amar Jawan Jyoti (Eternal Flame) and as a relief mural on the circumference wall with the Param Vir Chakra awardees who fought in J&K.

== In popular culture ==
- The first episode of TV series Param Vir Chakra, aired on DD National in 1988, featured Farooq Sheikh portraying him.
- A graphic novel titled Param Vir Chakra by Amar Chitra Katha dedicated their 1st story written by Sanjana Kapur and drawn by Durgesh Velhal in 2015
- A graphic novel titled Param Vir Chakra Somnath Sharma by Roli Books written by Ian Cardozo and drawn by Rishi Kumar in 2019

== Notes ==
Footnotes

Citations
