= Sherwood College =

Private school in Uttarakhand, India

Coordinates: 29.3830°N 79.4532°E

- School crest
- Nainital, Nainital district, Uttrakhand, India; Nainital, Uttarakhand

Information
- Type: Private
- Motto: Mereat quisque palmam (Let each one merit his prize)
- Established: 1869; 157 years ago
- School district: Nainital
- Principal: Amandeep Sandhu
- Grades: 3–12
- Enrollment: 500
- Houses: Robin Hood, Friar Tuck, Little John, Allen-a-Dale
- Colors: Maroon, bottle green, white
- Athletics: Football, cricket, tennis, basketball, swimming, field hockey, badminton, track and field, table-tennis
- Affiliation: ICSE, ISC
- Website: www.sherwood.edu.in

Sherwood College is a co-educational residential school in Nainital, Uttrakhand , India. It was established in 1869 and is affiliated to CISCE and IGCSE.

The school has been described in The Economic Times as one of a group of "old, rich and popular schools — the Eton equivalents in India ... These boarding schools are a state of mind in themselves, an attitude which can’t be duplicated".

== History ==
Sherwood was founded on 5 June 1869. It was the brain-child of Dr. Condon, H.S. Reid and others under the patronage of the Rt. Rev. Robert Milman, DD, the seventh Metropolitan of India. The idea took shape as the Diocesan Boys' High School, Naini Tal, as Sherwood was called until 1937. Sherwood's sister school, formally known as the Diocesan Girls' High School, became All Saints' College, Nainital.

Appeals to the public for funds were overwhelming, and a mixed school under Miss Bradbury was started at Petersfield. Its success was reflected in the large-scale rejection of applications for admission. The direct outcome of this pressure was to separate the girls from boys, the latter shifting to Stoneleigh near the Ramsay Hospital.

According to E. Atkinson's The Himalayan Gazetteer of 1882:

"In 1872 the number of pupils increased to 100, but still many applications were refused in consequence of the want of accommodation: The Committee then appealed to the general public for aid in erecting proper school buildings and met with generous response... In 1873 the Sherwood estate with house and magnificent grounds was purchased by the committee for the boys school and is perhaps the finest site and establishment of its kind in India. The report of the examiners show that both in the internal economy and in the character of the instruction imparted, the Diocesan schools thoroughly fulfill the designs of their founder's."

The school received notice to quit Sherwood so that a new Government House might be built. Accommodation was provided temporarily at Barnsdale near the present-day Secretariat. It was later decided to move the school to the 'health resort' of Khurpatal. Three houses on Alma hill — Tonnochy, Snow View and St. Cloud — served as temporary accommodation.

Land on a spur of Ayarpatta was acquired in 1897 and the foundation stone laid by Alfred, Lord Bishop of Lucknow, on 5 June. From that day, 5 June has been reckoned as Founder's Day.

In 1918 the school was divided into four houses:

House name	Color	Motto	Translation
Robin Hood	Green	Stet fortuna dumas	Let the fortunes of the house prevail
Friar Tuck	Blue	Quis separabit nos	None can separate us
Allen-a-Dale	Red	No lite cedere	Never give in
Little John	Yellow	Unus pro omnibus, omnes pro uno	One for all and all for one

In 1922 electricity came to Sherwood, and on 15 June of the same year the infirmary was dedicated and sanctified.

The Horsman brothers, both old Sherwoodians, donated Rs. 75,000/- for the construction of the junior wing known as Horsman Wing, completed in 1927.

In 1937, the name of the school was changed from the Diocesan Boys' School to Sherwood College.

The Binns block was built on the northern side of the back quad; in the following year, Milman Hall was constructed. The new building was formally opened by Sir Harry Haig, Governor of the U.P. It now accommodates a school hall with a seating capacity of 600 and a gymnasium below.

The college chapel, originally dedicated on 1 October 1913, was re-dedicated to St. Barnabas, the Apostle of Learning, on 5 June 1937. A stained-glass window depicting the Good Shepherd was erected on the school's Diamond Jubilee in 1929. The Hammond electric organ was installed in 1939. On Founder's Day, 5 June 1940, a teak altar and altar rails were dedicated to the memory of 'Old Tom' Taylor, a member of the college from 1884 to 1932. The following winter, the wooden paneling of 'shisham' was placed around the chapel and dedicated on Founder's Day 1941. In the same year at the Annual Confirmation Service the teak door was dedicated.

In 1947, the Old Sherwoodians Society had a plaque fabricated bearing the legend 'Sacred to the memory of Old Sherwoodians who made the Supreme Sacrifice in World War II', which lists the names of those who fell in action. Another roll of honour bearing the names of those who were in active service in World War II hangs in Milman Hall.

By 1948, independence had come to India and changes needed to be made. With the exodus of British families, numbers had dropped to a level hardly sufficient to sustain the establishment, but by 1957 the school had approximately 370 boys on its rolls. Additions were made, including an upper floor which was added to the infirmary, and the foundation-stone of the study block (now called Llewelyn Block, the top floor of which has since been demolished to provide an unrestricted view of the plains) was laid. A swimming pool was built.

In 1973, D.R.A. Mountford assumed headship. Between 1973 and 2003 a phased programme of renovation and construction was enacted. The school switched over to the 10+2 pattern under the Indian School Certificate in 1975, when the first batch appeared for the ICSE (class 10) examination. This was the year the last batch of ISC (year 11) appeared for the board examination. The first batch of ISC-12 appeared for the board examination in March 1978.

Two recent innovations have been the introduction of a Computer Literacy program for all students in classes 6 to 12 and the introduction of co-education at class 3 stage onwards.

The school has since seen a downfall in popularity with the new Principal (2004-) Amandeep Singh Sandhu, who has been subject to scrutiny and controversy for his role overseeing the death of 3 children due to negligence on the school administration, and avoiding jailtime due to his connection to stronger inner government officers etc. There have been calls for his removal which have since been either dismissed or avoided following news reports of the same

== Motto and colours ==
The school's motto, in Latin, is Mereat Quisque Palmam, meaning "Let each one merit his prize".

Sherwood was named after the Sherwood Foresters, and the school flag borrowed from their colours: bottle green, maroon and white. The houses are Allen-a-Dale or AD (red), Robin Hood or RH (green), Friar Tuck or FT (blue), and Little John or LJ (yellow), all named after Robin Hood and his Merry Men. Among the recent additions is the purple banner of the girls (Maid Marian).

== Campus and activities ==
The school is on a large, sprawling campus on the Ayarpata hill (one among the seven hills that boundary Nainital Lake). The school is divided into two parts: Dixon Wing (grades 7-12) and Horsman Wing (grades 3-6). There are separate dormitories for the students of both wings. The girls' dormitories are with the new teachers' residences, a little away from the main campus. The campus is an aesthetic blend of post-Edwardian style buildings embellished with Gothic patterned windows, Romanesque arches, oak-panelled walls, sturdy timber beams, quadrangles, and modern buildings.

It is mandatory for all students to participate in sports and extracurricular cultural activities, such as theatre, music (Indian and Western), fine arts, elocution, debating, and bi-annual group excursions.

The Art Block houses the Indian and Western music departments on the ground floor. The school has its own band. The first floor contains the Art department where the varieties range from crafts like batik and pottery to oil canvas painting. There is a Photography Club, a Hindi Literary Society, an English Literary Society and Senior and Junior Dramatics Societies. On basis of their evaluation in co-curricular activities, the houses are awarded the Co-Curricular Activities Cup at the Founders Prize ceremony.

The chapel (dedicated to Saint Barnabas) is on the front quad (or quadrangle), with views of the Kumaon hills descending into the Terai (the plains).

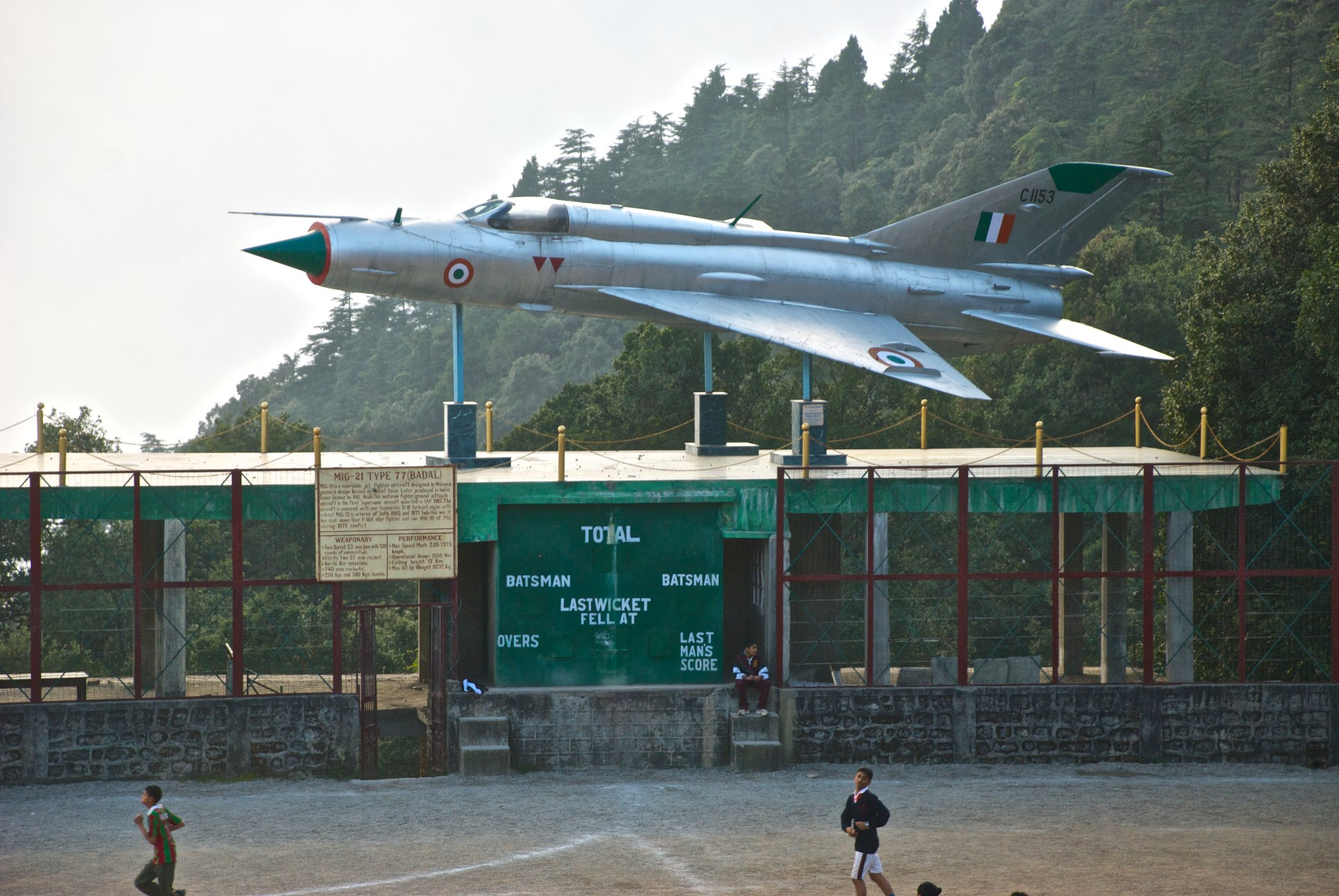
MiG-21FL seen installed over the scoreboard structure at the playground in Sherwood College.

In 2011, A phased-out MiG-21 FL was installed in the college. The plane had been promised by the then Air Marshal Sumit Mukherjee who was the chief guest at the Founder’s Day celebrations in 2009.

== Principals ==
Name	From	To
Rev. E. Baston	1869	1880
R.J. Elliott	1880	1886
Rev. A. Hancock	1887	1892
Rev. E. Munro	1893	1896
Rev. R. Biggs	1897	1898
R.C. Rosselet	1899	1902
W.A. Pemberton	1903	1906
C.H. Dixon	1907	1932
Rev. A.E. Binns	1932	1947
R.T. Lean	1948	1951
Rev. R.C. Llewelyn	1951	1966
C.D. Beaman	1967	1970
T.A.C. Kemp	1972	1972
D.R.A. Mountford	1973	2003
Amandeep Sandhu	2004	present

== Notable alumni ==
=== Armed forces ===
Approximately 300 alumni were on Active Service in World Wars 1 and 2:

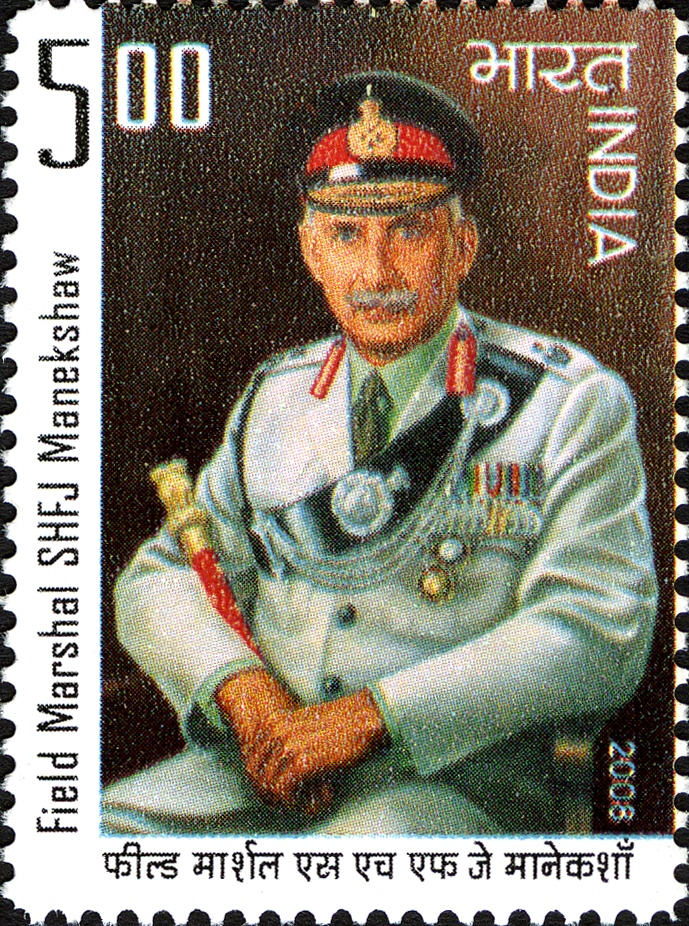
Sam Manekshaw

- Brigadier Vijay Kumar Berry MVC, Indian Army. Recipient of India’s 2nd highest wartime Gallantry award.
- Vice Admiral Anil Chopra PVSM AVSM, (Western Naval Command C-in-C), Indian Navy.
- Major Shekhar Dutt SM (gallantary). 31st Defence Secretary of India (2005-2007), Deputy National Advisor of India (2007-2009), 4th Governor of Chattisgarh (2010-2014), Indian Amry, Indian Administrative Services.
- Lt Gen Sir Martin Garrod, KCB CMG OBE DL Commandant General, Royal Marines (UK)
- Lt Gen Syed Ata Hasnain, Indian Army PVSM UVSM AVSM SM VSM & Bar, 43rd Governor of Bihar.
- Lt Gen Sami Khan, PVSM SM Indian Army
- Field Marshal Sam Manekshaw, Padma Vibhushan, Padma Bhushan, MC, former Chief of the Army Staff, Indian Army
- Air Marshal Michael McMahon AVSM VM (Vice Chief of Air Staff), Indian Air Force. (Mentioned - in - Despatches 1966 & 1972)
- Air Marshal Subroto Mukerjee OBE, First Indian Chief of Indian Air Force. (Mentioned - In - Despatches 1943)
- Air Marshal Sumit Mukherjee SC PVSM VSM, (Air Officer C-in-C), Indian Air Force. Recipient of India's 3rd highest peacetime Gallantary award.
- Air Commodore Syed Mansoor Ahmad Shah SQA (Polly Shah), (Assistant Chief of Air Staff Operations), Pakistan Air Force
- Major Somnath Sharma PVC, Indian Army first recipient of India's highest wartime gallantry award Param Vir Chakra
- General Vishwa Nath Sharma PVSM, former Chief of the Army Staff, Indian Army

=== Performing arts ===
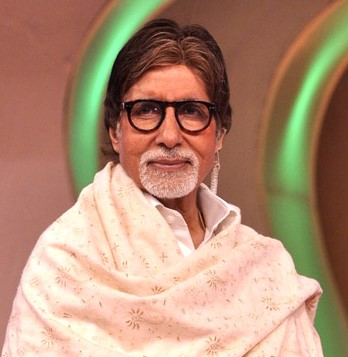
Amitabh Bachchan

- Amitabh Bachchan, celebrated actor
- Sean Banerjee, television actor
- Kabir Bedi
- Neville Bower, composer and concert pianist
- Nikhil Dwivedi, actor
- Ram Kapoor, television and film actor
- Jameel Khan, actor
- Vivek Mushran, actor
- Anshul Pandey, actor
- Vipul Roy, television and film actor
- Dalip Tahil, actor

=== Other alumni ===
- Fateh Chand Badhwar, OBE, MBE (Mil.) Padma Vinhushan Indian civil servant, first Chairman Railway Board (India)
- Angad Vir Singh Bajwa, Olympic Shooter, Skeet final round world record holder
- Sir Kul Rattan Chadha, Founder & Former CEO Mexx International, Knighted by Queen Beatrice of The Netherlands in 2000, Awarded the Grand Seigneur award of the Netherlands – the highest award in the country for excellence in branding and lifestyle marketing.
- Jim Corbett CIE OBE, Indo-British hunter, tracker, naturalist and author
- Virendra Dayal, IAS, senior UN official
- Rajeev Dhavan, Senior Advocate, a human rights activist, author, and Commissioner of the International Commission of Jurists
- Justice Ravi S. Dhavan, former Chief Justice of Patna High Court
- Hemang Dixit, Nepalese educator, author, and paediatrician
- Salman Haidar, former Foreign Secretary of India, former Indian high commissioner to the United Kingdom
- Rahul Johri, Former CEO of Board of Control for Cricket in India (BCCI), Former President Zee Entertainment Enterprises India Ltd
- Akhlaqur Rahman Kidwai Padma Vibhushan (Former Governor Haryana, Bihar & West Bengal) (Former MP Rajya Sabha)
- Cass Mann, AIDS activist
- Kaleem Omar, Pakistani journalist
- Gyanendra Pandey, former chair of the Department of Anthropology at Johns Hopkins University
- Jitendra Prasada, Indian politician and a former vice-president of the Indian National Congress
- Jitin Prasada, Minister of PWD Government of Uttar Pradesh, former Union Minister
- Anurag Sharma (politician), Parliamentarian and Industrialist
- Ray Whiteside, Australian Olympic field hockey player
