= Deep Narayan Sinha =

Indian judge

Governor of West Bengal (Acting)
- In office 1 April 1969 – 19 September 1969
- Preceded by: Dharma Vira
- Succeeded by: Shanti Swaroop Dhavan

Deep Narayan Sinha was an Indian judge and the Chief Justice of the Calcutta High Court from 1966 to 1970. He was also the acting Governor of West Bengal.
