= La. Ganesan =

Indian politician (1945–2025)

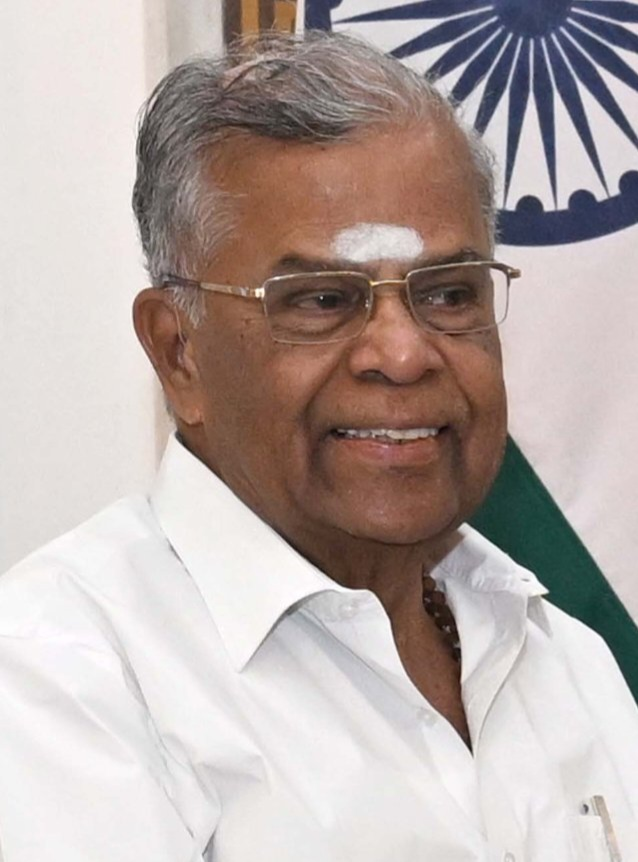
- Official portrait, 2023

16th Governor of Nagaland
- In office 20 February 2023 – 15 August 2025
- Chief Minister: Neiphiu Rio
- Preceded by: Jagdish Mukhi (additional charge)
- Succeeded by: Ajay Kumar Bhalla (additional charge)

15th Governor of Manipur
- In office 27 August 2021 – 19 February 2023
- Chief Minister: N. Biren Singh
- Preceded by: Ganga Prasad (additional charge)
- Succeeded by: Anusuiya Uikey

Governor of West Bengal
- Additional Charge
- In office 18 July 2022 – 17 November 2022
- Chief Minister: Mamata Banerjee
- Preceded by: Jagdeep Dhankhar
- Succeeded by: C. V. Ananda Bose

Member of Parliament, Rajya Sabha
- In office 6 October 2016 – 2 April 2018
- Leader of the House: Arun Jaitley
- Preceded by: Najma Heptullah
- Succeeded by: Kailash Soni
- Constituency: Madhya Pradesh

8th President of Bharatiya Janata Party, Tamil Nadu
- In office 22 September 2006 – 30 December 2009
- Preceded by: C. P. Radhakrishnan
- Succeeded by: Pon Radhakrishnan

Personal details
- Born: 16 February 1945 Thanjavur, Madras Province, British India (present-day Tamil Nadu, India)
- Died: 15 August 2025 (aged 80) Chennai, Tamil Nadu, India
- Party: Bharatiya Janata Party
- Education: S.S.L.C.
- Profession: Politician

La Ganesan Iyer (16 February 1945 – 15 August 2025) was an Indian politician who served as the 16th Governor of Nagaland from February 2023 until his death in August 2025. His previous tenures included ones as the 15th Governor of Manipur between August 2021 and February 2023, and the Governor of West Bengal (Additional Charge) between July 2022 and November 2022. Before that, he was a member of the Rajya Sabha from Madhya Pradesh. Ganesan was a senior leader of the Bharatiya Janata Party and a veteran of the Rashtriya Swayamsevak Sangh.

== Early life ==
La. Ganesan was born on 16 February 1945 at Tanjore, Madras Province, to Lakshmi Raghava Iyer, a businessman, and Alamelu. His father died when Ganesan was nine years old. Following this, he developed an active interest in the RSS, with which his family was associated. After completing his SSLC, he joined the Revenue Department as a Revenue Settlement Inspector. He remained unmarried and later resigned from his post after nine years to serve as a full-time RSS pracharak ("volunteer").

== Political career ==
Before being appointed General Secretary of the Tamil Nadu Bharatiya Janata Party (BJP) unit, he was a pracharak in RSS. He escaped the police during the Indira Gandhi government's oppressive Emergency, where many civil and political opponents to the Congress government were detained, and lived in hiding for about a year. He then served as the National Secretary and as the Vice President of BJP. He was selected as the President of BJP's Tamil Nadu state unit.

He was once a Member of Parliament in the Rajya Sabha and replaced the former union minister Najma Heptulla as a Member of Parliament in the Rajya Sabha from Madhya Pradesh.

=== Speech about sacrificing Tamil Nadu ===
Ganesan's comments on protests started by locals against extraction of hydrocarbons at Neduvasal village in Tamil Nadu became controversial when he said, "There is nothing wrong in sacrificing a state for the welfare of the country."

=== Attack on Kirubanidhi ===
Kirubanidhi, the first Dalit president of the BJP in Tamil Nadu, along with La. Ganesan, went to Indore, Madhya Pradesh, to participate in the BJP national council's meeting in 2003. After the meeting, La. Ganesan started verbally abusing Kirubanidhi by criticizing Kirubanidhi's caste. In an interview, Kirubanidhi said the fight was over the misuse of funds by La. Ganesan that he had pointed out.

== Governorship (2021-2025) ==
=== Governor of Manipur (2021-23) ===
On 22 August 2021, he was appointed the 17th Governor of Manipur by President of India, Shri Ram Nath Kovind. He was sworn in as the 17th Governor of Manipur at the Darbar Hall of Raj Bhavan, Imphal on 27 August 2021. He was administered the oath of office by the Honourable Chief Justice of Manipur High Court PV Sanjay Kumar. Chief Minister N. Biren Singh, ministers, and legislators were present at the ceremony. He served in the post until 12 February 2023, after which Anusuiya Uikey was appointed.

=== Additional charge as Governor of West Bengal (2022) ===
On 18 July 2022, Ganesan assumed the office of Governor of West Bengal, after Jagdeep Dhankhar had been nominated as vice-presidential candidate by the National Democratic Alliance coalition.

Ganesan received backlash for pushing Indian footballer Sunil Chhetri out of a photo op during the presentation ceremony of the 2022 Durand Cup.

=== Governor of Nagaland (2023-25) ===
On 20 February 2023, Ganesan was appointed the 19th Governor of Nagaland by the President of India, Droupadi Murmu. He served until his death in 2025.

== Illness and death ==
Ganesan received treatment for a wound on his foot caused by diabetes. Later, while resting at home, on 5 August 2025, he collapsed into unconscious state after his leg went numb.

On 8 August, he experienced dizziness and nausea, after which he was admitted to Apollo Hospital in Thousand Lights, Chennai. Medical tests revealed a blood clot in his head. Following surgery for the clot, he was kept in the ICU under close observation, but died on 15 August, at the age of 80. He became the first governor of Nagaland to die in office.

Government offices
| Preceded by Jagdish Mukhi | Governor of Nagaland; 20 February 2023 – 15 August 2025 | Succeeded by Ajay Kumar Bhalla; Additional Charge |
| Preceded by Ganga Prasad; Additional Charge | Governor of Manipur; 27 August 2021 – 21 February 2023 | Succeeded by Anusuiya Uikey |
| Preceded by Jagdeep Dhankhar | Governor of West Bengal; Additional Charge; 18 July 2022 – 22 November 2022 | Succeeded by C. V. Ananda Bose |
