= Hindi University =

Research University in West Bengal, India

- Official Emblem
- Latin: Universitas Hindica
- Motto: jñāna ēkatā pragati
- Motto in English: Knowledge Unity Progress
- Type: Public university
- Established: 10 January 2020; 6 years ago
- Academic affiliations: AIU; UGC
- Budget: ₹1.009 crore (US$105,257.00) (2024–25)
- Chancellor: Governor of West Bengal
- Vice-Chancellor: Nandini Sahu
- Students: 80
- Postgraduates: 80
- Location: Howrah, West Bengal, India; 22°35′54.1″N 88°15′47.93″E
- Campus: Urban
- Language: English; Hindi
- Journal: Hindi University Journal of Interdisciplinary Studies
- Website: www.hindiuniv.ac.in

Hindi University (abbr. HU, ISO: hindī viśvavidyālaya) is a non-affiliating Public research university located in Howrah, West Bengal. The university was established in 2019 under The Hindi University Act, 2019. It became active with the appointment of the first vice-chancellor, Damodar Mishra, in 2021. Its first batch started in Narashingha Dutta College.The university building is under construction in Uttar Arupara near Kolkata Police Training Camp in Howrah.

== Departments and Post Graduate Programmes ==
The Hindi University has 4 arts department and they run 4 Post-Graduate Programme & courses in West Bengal :

- Department of Hindi : M.A. in Hindi
- Department of Translation Studies : M.A in Translation Studies (Anuvad Sahitya)
- Department of History : M.A in History
- Department of Political Science : M.A in Political Science

== See also ==
- List of universities in West Bengal
- Education in India
- Education in West Bengal
