= C. V. Ananda Bose =

Former Governor of West Bengal

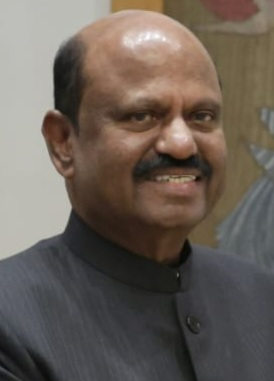
- Bose c. 2023

34th Governor of West Bengal
- In office 18 November 2022 – 12 March 2026
- Chief Minister: Mamata Banerjee
- Preceded by: La. Ganesan (additional charge)
- Succeeded by: R. N. Ravi

Personal details
- Born: 2 January 1951 (age 75) Mannanam, Kottayam, Travancore-Cochin (present-day Keralam), India
- Spouse: Lakshmi Bose
- Children: 2
- Parent(s): P. K. Vasudevan Nair, Padmavathy Amma
- Education: University of Kerala (M.A.); BITS Pilani (Ph.D.)
- Occupation: Politician; civil servant
- Awards: Jawaharlal Nehru Fellowship
- Website: drcvanandabose.com

Chettezham Vasudevan Nair Ananda Bose (born 2 January 1951) is an Indian retired Indian Administrative Service officer of the batch of 1977 and politician, who served as the 21st Governor of West Bengal from 2022 until his resignation in 2026.

== Early life ==
Ananda Bose was born at Mannanam in the Kottayam district of Kerala to freedom fighter P. K. Vasudevan Nair and Padmavathy Amma, a former government official.

Bose studied at St. Ephrem’s School, Mannanam; Kuriakose Elias College, Mannanam; and then at St. Berchmans College, Changanassery, before earning a Ph.D. from BITS, Pilani.

== Career ==
As the administrator of the National Museum, Bose launched a 100-day programme which spelt out specific measures to revamp and revitalise the institution. Most of the improvements suggested were achieved in 60 days, such as opening the closed-down galleries, modernising the display and lighting, launching outreach programmes to take the museum to the community, arranging children's programme to ignite young minds to the greatness of India's national heritage, organising international exhibitions and launching the People's Museum movement, to mention a few.

== Personal life ==
Ananda Bose is married to L. S. Lakshmi, and the couple has a son and a daughter. His daughter, Nandita Bose, died of cancer in 2017. He has 350 publications to his credit, including 70 books, consisting of novels, short stories, and poems in Malayalam, Hindi, English, and Bengali.

== Governor of West Bengal ==
On 17 November 2022, Bose was appointed Governor of West Bengal by President Droupadi Murmu.. On 5 March 2026, he resigned from his post as the Governor of West Bengal via a letter to the President of India.

== Controversy ==
On 2 May 2024 Bose was accused of sexual harassment by a woman contractual staff of Raj Bhavan, Kolkata. The woman alleged that the Governor had “molested” her on 24 April 2024. Bose completely denied the issue as maligning for political mileage during the 2024 Indian general election and hit back saying “truth would triumph,” and he would not be “cowed down by engineered narratives". The Bharatiya Janata Party and the Communist Party of India (Marxist) also questioned the connections of the women with the governing Trinamool Congress. The woman filed her complaint which was forwarded to the Hare Street Police station. Kolkata Police set up an investigation team and have sought CCTV footages. On 15 May 2024, a different allegation of sexual harassment against Bose was raised by one Odissi dancer. The dancer lodged a complain and accused Bose and his nephew of sexual abuse at Start Hotel in Delhi in January 2023.

Government offices
Preceded by La. Ganesan; Additional Charge	Governor of West Bengal; 23 November 2022 - 5 March 2026	Succeeded by R. N. Ravi
