= Shanti Swaroop Dhavan =

Indian statesman, diplomat and jurist

6th Governor of West Bengal
- In office 19 September 1969 – 21 August 1971
- Preceded by: Deep Narayan Sinha (acting)
- Succeeded by: Anthony Lancelot Dias

Personal details
- Born: 2 July 1906; Dera Ismail Khan
- Died: 1 January 1978 (aged 71)

Shanti Swaroop Dhavan (2 July 1906 – 1 January 1978) was an Indian statesman, diplomat and jurist who was the 6th Governor of West Bengal from 19 September 1969 to 21 August 1971.

== Life and career ==
Dhavan was born on 2 July 1906 to Rai Bahadur Bali Ram Dhavan, and hailed from Dera Ismail Khan, in Khyber-Pakhtunkhwa, Pakistan. He was educated at the Forman Christian College, Lahore, at Emmanuel College, Cambridge (where he became the first Indian President of the Cambridge Union), and in law at the Middle Temple, Inns of Court, London. He served as a lecturer in law at Allahabad University from 1940 to 1954. Dhavan then served as a judge of the Allahabad High Court from 28 June 1958 to 2 July 1967, and was appointed a senior advocate at the Supreme Court of India. Dhavan was then appointed High Commissioner to the United Kingdom, and served from 1968 to 1969.

He had two sons: Ravi S. Dhavan, who was a judge of the High Courts of Allahabad and Patna; and Rajeev Dhavan, who became President of the Cambridge Union like his father, and is now a famous Senior Advocate practicing in Supreme Court of India. His daughter Rani Dhavan Shankardass is an Indian social historian and global expert on prison reform. She is the Secretary General of Penal Reform and Justice Association (PRAJA) and the President of Penal Reform International.

== Gubernatorial Tenure ==
He was Governor of West Bengal from 19 September 1969 to 21 August 1971. Dhavan's gubernatorial tenure was marked by the imposition of two stints of President's rule following the fall of the United Front government of Ajoy Mukherjee and the collapse of his third ministry in 1971.
