= Dadh =

- village
- Location in Himachal Pradesh, India Dadh (India)
- Coordinates: 32.08°N 76.25°E
- Country: India
- State: Himachal Pradesh
- District: Kangra district

Languages
  - Official: Hindi
- Time zone: UTC+5:30 (IST)
- PIN: 176052
- Nearest city: Dharamsala, Hamirpur, Chamba, Dalhousie

Dadh Jhikla is a village in the Palampur tehsil of Kangra district in Himachal Pradesh state, India. The village is facilitated by bus service with a major bus stop Dadh available within the village. Rail transport is also available within 5 km radius.

== Notable personalities ==
- India's first Param Vir Chakra award recipient, Major Somnath Sharma who was posthumously awarded the Param Vir Chakra for his bravery in the Kashmir operations in November 1947 at Budgam.
