= List of governors of West Bengal =

Governor of West Bengal
- Emblem of West Bengal

- Flag of India

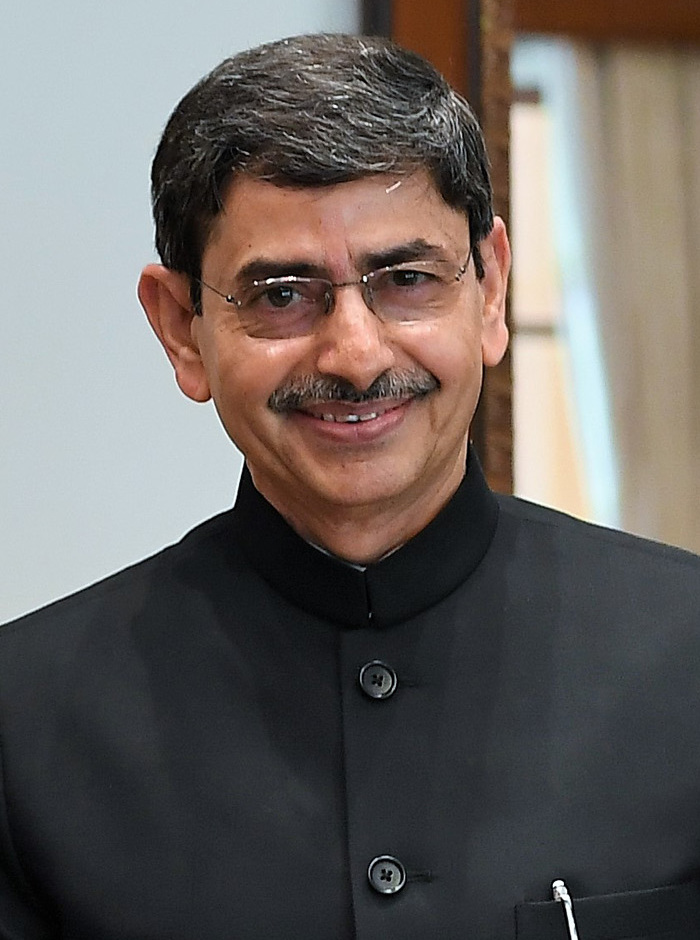
- Incumbent; R. N. Ravi since 12 March 2026
- Style: The Honourable (formal); Mr. Governor (informal); His/Her Excellency
- Status: Head of state
- Abbreviation: GoWB
- Residence: Lok Bhavan, Kolkata (primary); Lok Bhavan, Darjeeling (summer)
- Appointer: President of India
- Term length: At the pleasure of the president
- Precursor: Governor-General of India
- Inaugural holder: Chakravarthi Rajagopalachari
- Formation: 15 August 1947; 79 years ago
- Salary: ₹350,000 (US$3,600) (per month)
- Website: rajbhavankolkata.gov.in

The governor of West Bengal is the nominal head of the Indian state of West Bengal. The governor is appointed by the President of India. R. N. Ravi is the incumbent governor since 12 March 2026.

== Powers and functions ==
The governor enjoys many different types of powers:

- Executive powers related to administration, appointments and removals;
- Legislative powers related to lawmaking and the state legislature, that is Vidhan Sabha or Vidhan Parishad;
- Discretionary powers to be carried out according to the discretion of the governor.

=== Ex officio role of governor ===
In his ex officio capacity, the governor of West Bengal is Chancellor of the universities of West Bengal (37 as of June 2026) as per the Acts of the Universities. The Universities are:

- Aliah University
- Alipurduar University
- Baba Saheb Ambedkar Education University
- Bankura University
- Bidhan Chandra Krishi Viswavidyalaya
- Biswa Bangla Biswabidyalay
- Cooch Behar Panchanan Barma University
- Darjeeling Hills University
- Dakshin Dinajpur University
- Diamond Harbour Women's University
- Harichand Guruchand University
- Hindi University
- Jadavpur University
- Kanyashree University
- Kazi Nazrul University
- Mahatma Gandhi University
- Maulana Abul Kalam Azad University of Technology
- Murshidabad University
- Netaji Subhas Open University
- North Bengal University
- Presidency University, Kolkata
- Rabindra Bharati University
- Raiganj University
- Rani Rashmoni Green University
- Sadhu Ramchand Murmu University of Jhargram
- Sidho Kanho Birsha University
- The Sanskrit College and University
- University of Burdwan
- University of Gour Banga
- University of Kalyani
- University of Calcutta
- Uttar Banga Krishi Viswavidyalaya
- Vidyasagar University
- Visva Bharati, here the governor is the Pradhana (Rector).
- National University of Juridical Sciences
- West Bengal State University
- West Bengal University of Animal and Fishery Sciences
- West Bengal University of Health Sciences

The governor is also the chairman or president of some organisations, such as Victoria Memorial Hall, Indian Museum, Ramakrishna Mission Institute of Culture, Eastern Zonal Cultural Centre, Maulana Abul Kalam Azad Institute of Asian Studies (MAKAIAS), Calcutta Cultural Centre (Kolkata Kala Kendra), Special Fund for R&R of Ex-servicemen, West Bengal Rajya Sainik Board, Sri Aurobindo Samiti, Indian Red Cross Society - West Bengal State Branch, St. John Ambulance Brigade No. II (West Bengal) District, Bharat Scouts and Guides, and the Bengal Tuberculosis Association.

The governor of West Bengal’s Welfare Fund has the governor as its chairman. Contributions from this fund are given to the needy people for meeting, to some extent, the cost of their treatment. Besides the above, at his discretion, the governor accepts the position of Chief Patron/Patron or other posts in the honorary capacity, in various organisations that are rendering yeoman service to society in different fields.

== List ==
Legend

- ^{†} Died in office
- ^{§} Transferred
- ^{‡} Resigned/removed

Color key

- indicates acting/additional charge

#	Portrait	Name (born – died)	Home state	Tenure in office			Appointer (President)
#	Portrait	Name (born – died)	Home state	From	To	Time in office	Appointer (President)
1		Chakravarti Rajagopalachari (1878–1972)	Madras Presidency	15 August 1947	21 June 1948^{[‡]} (Note: Resigned to become the Governor-General of India)	311 days	Lord Mountbatten (Governor-General)
2		Kailash Nath Katju (1887–1968)	Central Provinces and Berar	21 June 1948	1 November 1951	3 years, 133 days	Lord Mountbatten (Governor-General)
3		Harendra Coomar Mookerjee (1887–1956)	West Bengal	1 November 1951	7 August 1956^{[†]}	4 years, 280 days	Rajendra Prasad
4		Justice; Phani Bhusan Chakravartti (1898–1981) (Acting)	West Bengal	8 August 1956	3 November 1956	87 days	Rajendra Prasad
5		Padmaja Naidu (1900–1975)	Andhra Pradesh	3 November 1956	1 June 1967	10 years, 210 days	Rajendra Prasad
6		Dharma Vira; ICS (Retd.) (1906–2000)	Uttar Pradesh	1 June 1967	1 April 1969	1 year, 304 days	Zakir Husain
7		Justice; Deep Narayan Sinha (Acting)	West Bengal	1 April 1969	19 September 1969	171 days	Zakir Husain
8		Shanti Swaroop Dhavan (1906–1978)	Uttar Pradesh	19 September 1969	21 August 1971	1 year, 336 days	V. V. Giri
9		Anthony Lancelot Dias; ICS (Retd.) (1910–2002)	Maharashtra	21 August 1971	6 November 1979	8 years, 77 days	V. V. Giri
10		Tribhuvan Narain Singh (1904–1982)	Uttar Pradesh	6 November 1979	12 September 1981	1 year, 310 days	Neelam Sanjiva Reddy
11		Bhairab Dutt Pande; ICS (Retd.) (1917–2009)	Uttar Pradesh	12 September 1981	10 October 1983^{[§]} (Note: Transferred as the Governor of Punjab)	2 years, 28 days	Neelam Sanjiva Reddy
12		Anant Prasad Sharma (1919–1988)	Bihar	10 October 1983	16 August 1984	311 days	Zail Singh
13		Justice; Satish Chandra (Acting) (1924–2000)	Uttar Pradesh	16 August 1984	1 October 1984	46 days	Zail Singh
14		Uma Shankar Dikshit (1901–1991)	Uttar Pradesh	1 October 1984	12 August 1986^{[‡]}	1 year, 315 days	Zail Singh
15		Saiyid Nurul Hasan (1921–1993)	Uttar Pradesh	12 August 1986	20 March 1989^{[§]} (Note: Transferred as the Governor of Orissa)	2 years, 220 days	Zail Singh
16		T. V. Rajeswar; IPS (Retd.) (1926–2018)	Tamil Nadu	20 March 1989	7 February 1990^{[‡]}	324 days	Ramaswamy Venkataraman
(15)		Saiyid Nurul Hasan (1921–1993)	Uttar Pradesh	7 February 1990	3 January 1991	330 days	Ramaswamy Venkataraman
17		K. V. Raghunatha Reddy (1924–2002) (Acting)	Andhra Pradesh	4 January 1991	23 January 1991	19 days	Ramaswamy Venkataraman
(15)		Saiyid Nurul Hasan (1921–1993)	Uttar Pradesh	24 January 1991	3 January 1992	344 days	Ramaswamy Venkataraman
18		Mohammad Shafi Qureshi (1928–2016) (Acting)	Jammu and Kashmir	3 January 1992	23 January 1992	20 days	Ramaswamy Venkataraman
(15)		Saiyid Nurul Hasan (1921–1993)	Uttar Pradesh	24 January 1992	12 July 1993^{[†]}	1 year, 169 days	Ramaswamy Venkataraman
19		B. Satya Narayan Reddy (1927–2012) (Additional Charge)	Andhra Pradesh	13 July 1993	14 August 1993	32 days	Shankar Dayal Sharma
(17)		K. V. Raghunatha Reddy (1924–2002)	Andhra Pradesh	14 August 1993	27 April 1998	4 years, 256 days	Shankar Dayal Sharma
20		Akhlaqur Rahman Kidwai (1921–2016)	National Capital Territory of Delhi	27 April 1998	18 May 1999^{[‡]}	1 year, 21 days	K. R. Narayanan
21		Justice; Shyamal Kumar Sen (born 1940)	West Bengal	18 May 1999	4 December 1999	200 days	K. R. Narayanan
22		Viren J. Shah (1926–2013)	Gujarat	4 December 1999	14 December 2004	5 years, 10 days	K. R. Narayanan
23		Gopalkrishna Gandhi; IAS (Retd.) (born 1945)	National Capital Territory of Delhi	14 December 2004	14 December 2009	5 years, 0 days	A. P. J. Abdul Kalam
24		Devanand Konwar (1934–2020) (Additional Charge)	Assam	14 December 2009	23 January 2010	40 days	Pratibha Patil
25		M. K. Narayanan; IPS (Retd.) (born 1934)	Tamil Nadu	24 January 2010	30 June 2014^{[‡]}	4 years, 157 days	Pratibha Patil
26		D. Y. Patil (1935–2026) (Additional Charge)	Maharashtra	3 July 2014	17 July 2014	14 days	Pranab Mukherjee
27		Keshari Nath Tripathi (1934–2023)	Uttar Pradesh	24 July 2014	29 July 2019	5 years, 5 days	Pranab Mukherjee
28		Jagdeep Dhankhar (born 1951)	Rajasthan	30 July 2019	17 July 2022^{[‡]} (Note: Resigned to become the Vice President of India)	2 years, 352 days	Ram Nath Kovind
29		La. Ganesan (1945–2025) (Additional Charge)	Tamil Nadu	18 July 2022	17 November 2022	122 days	Ram Nath Kovind
30		C. V. Ananda Bose; IAS (Retd.) (born 1951)	Keralam	18 November 2022	12 March 2026^{[‡]}	3 years, 114 days	Droupadi Murmu
31		R. N. Ravi; IPS (Retd.) (born 1952)	Bihar	12 March 2026	Incumbent	215 days	Droupadi Murmu

== Oath ==
Ami, [Apnar Naam], Ishwarer naame shapath korchhi je, ami faithful bhabe [State-er Naam]-er Governor-er office execute korbo (othoba Governor-er shob functions discharge korbo) ebong ami amar best ability diye Constitution ar law-ke preserve, protect, ar defend korbo. Ami nijeke [State-er Naam]-er manushder service ar well-being-er jonne devote korbo."

== See also ==
- West Bengal
- Governors and Lieutenant-Governors of states of India
