= Rani Dhavan Shankardass =

Indian social historian and global expert on prison reform

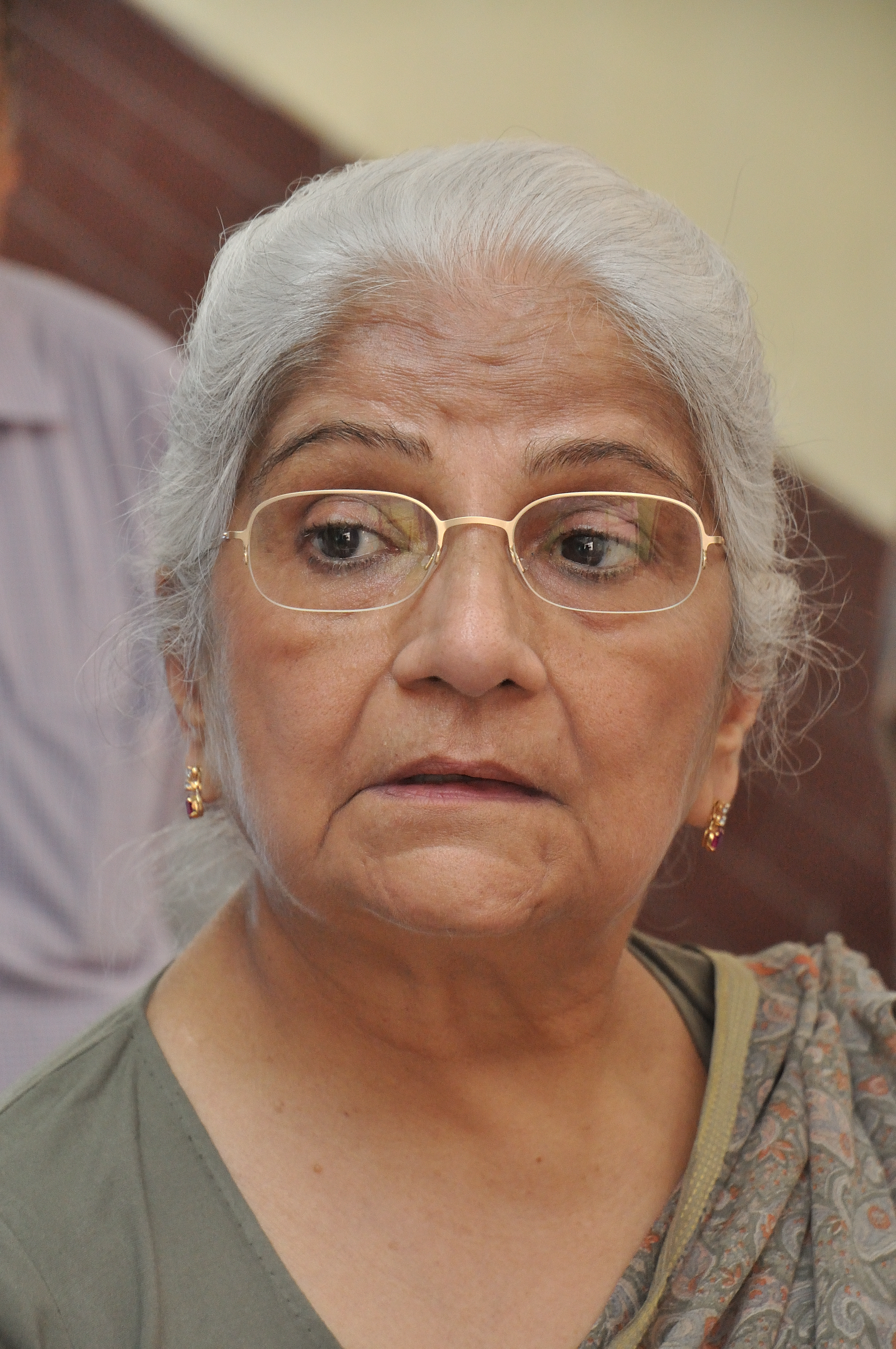
- Rani Dhavan Shankardass in 2016
- Education: University of Cambridge; University of London; University of Pennsylvania; University of Allahabad
- Occupations: Historian, author
- Spouse: Vijay Shankardass
- Writing career
- Genres: History, social science, criminology
- Notable works: Of Women Inside: Their Yesterdays Todays and Tomorrows (2011), In Conflict and Custody: Therapeutic Counselling for Women (2012)

Rani Dhavan Shankardass is an Indian social historian and global expert on prison reform. She is the Secretary General of Penal Reform and Justice Association (PRAJA) and the President of Penal Reform International.

== Education and career ==
Rani Dhavan Shankardass was born in Allahabad, India to parents from the North West Frontier Province and schooled in Allahabad, Nainital, and Lucknow. She studied History and Political Science at the University of Allahabad. She has five graduate degrees across the academic divisions of Social, Political and Economic History, including two MA degrees from University of Allahabad and University of Pennsylvania, MSc and M.Litt degrees from Girton College, University of Cambridge and a PhD from School of Oriental and African Studies, University of London. She began her career as a lecturer in Political Science at Kamla Nehru College, University of Delhi, India. Her earlier work was focused primarily on political history. Subsequently, she became a senior research fellow at the Centre for Contemporary Studies, Nehru Memorial Museum and Library, New Delhi, India. During this time, her interests gradually moved to issues relating to social change and the factors that have facilitated or hindered such change in colonial and postcolonial India. Her first project at Teen Murti House was on debt bondage (bonded labour), a pervasive form of slavery across India. Her next project was on the history and workings of the prison system in India. Her current research area continues to be on penal reform across South Asia with a specific focus on the mental health and care of women in prisons and custodial justice.

She is a leading figure in prison reform and prisoner rehabilitation movements in various parts of the world, and regularly designs and oversees workshops that train judicial and law enforcement officials on crucial developments in penal reform policy and human rights centred approaches to the penal system. She speaks extensively at conferences and seminars as well as at the United Nations and has appeared as an expert on punishment and prisons on numerous radio and TV shows. She is the author and coauthor of numerous books on criminal justice, prisons and penal reform and has contributed articles on these issues to numerous newspapers and journals, including Times of India, Daily Telegraph, Economic and Political Weekly, Seminar, and Social Welfare. In 2014 she spoke at the Jaipur Literature Festival in two sessions, Prisons of the Mind and The Political Imagination. During her tenure as a Nehru Fellow she was invited to join the Board of Penal Reform International, a non-government organisation based in the UK, with consultative status with the United Nations. She served as its Chairperson from 2006 to 2011 and currently serves as its Honorary President.

== Writing ==
Dr Dhavan Shankardass has written extensively on social history and human rights. Notable published works include The First Congress Raj: Provincial Autonomy in Bombay (Macmillan, 1982), Vallabhbhai Patel: Power and Organization in Indian Politics (Orient Longman, 1986), Punishment and the Prison: Indian and International Perspectives (Sage, 2000) (an edited multi-disciplinary volume that spanned history, sociology, law, justice and gender), and Barred from Life and Scarred for Life: The Experiences of Women in the Criminal Justice System in India (PRAJA, 2004). Her most recent publications are Of Women Inside: Prison Voices from India (Routledge, 2011) and In Conflict and Custody: Therapeutic Counselling of Women (Sage, 2012). The books were launched together in the House of Lords at the British Parliament in 2012. and were introduced by Baroness Helena Kennedy and Baroness Vivien Stern. Both volumes complement each other: one sets out the trials and tribulations of women sent to prison, sometimes avoidably, and questions the role of the law on the subject, and the other suggests how those problems that relate exclusively to women in custody might be addressed. She is currently researching and working on the subject of ‘Children of Incarcerated Parents’ with a special focus on South Asia.

== Awards ==
In 1996, she was awarded the prestigious Jawaharlal Nehru Fellowship for her work Prison, Punishment and Criminal Justice.

== Personal ==
She spends her time between her homes in New Delhi and London.
