= Penal Reform International =

International nongovernmental organization

Penal Reform International (commonly known as PRI), founded in London in 1989, is an international nongovernmental organization working on penal and criminal justice reform worldwide. It is a Dutch Association.

== Activities ==
Penal Reform International (PRI) is a non-governmental organisation working globally to promote criminal justice systems that uphold human rights for all and do no harm. It aims to make criminal justice systems non-discriminatory and protect the rights of disadvantaged people. It runs practical human rights programmes and support reforms that make criminal justice fair and effective. PRI is Headquartered across the UK and the Netherlands leads and coordinates its cross-regional programmes, international policy and advocacy activities. Its regional offices implement practical programmes and provide technical assistance at a national and regional level.

PRI has consultative status at the United Nations (ECOSOC), the Inter-Parliamentary Union, the African Commission on Human and Peoples' Rights, the African Committee of Experts on the Rights and Welfare of the Child and the Council of Europe.

PRI produces information resources for policy-makers and criminal justice agencies, including research reports, policy briefings and training materials. Publications include Global Prison Trends, an annual overview of current trends and challenges in policy and practice in the criminal justice and penal fields.

== History ==
PRI was founded in 1989 by a group of criminal justice and human rights activists after the fall of the Berlin Wall. Founder members include Ahmed Othmani, a former Tunisian political prisoner and activist, and Baroness Vivien Stern.

Since its establishment, PRI has worked at the United Nations to improve norms and standards to strengthen the protection of the rights of people in criminal justice systems.

It helped to negotiate the 2010 United Nations Rules for the Treatment of Women Prisoners and Non-Custodial Measures for Women Offenders. Between 2011 and 2015, it took part in the negotiations for the revision of the United Nations Standard Minimum Rules for the Treatment of Prisoners – renamed 'the Mandela Rules' – a key set of standards used in prison administration.

PRI became known in particular for its work in Africa in the 1990s and 2000s, for example, helping to establish the Paralegal Advisory Service (PAS) in Malawi, which became a model for the development of paralegal services in other African countries, and setting up a community service programme in Zimbabwe in 1992 in response to a serious crisis of overcrowding in its prisons. PRI went on to develop community service programmes in Kenya and Burkina Faso, and is working in East Africa today with national probation services develop community service.

PRI also worked with the Rwandan government to deal with the overwhelming number of genocide cases in the late 1990s and early 2000s. This included the development and monitoring of the Gacaca Court ('grass court') process.

In Algeria, PRI has commended the partnership between the government's prison administration and groups in civil society, which have focused on reforms of the penitentiary system as well as support for released prisoners, particularly women.
