= Rajeev Dhavan =

Indian lawyer

- Born: 4 August 1946 (age 80)(India)
- Occupation: Lawyer
- Known for: Civil rights activity

Rajeev Dhavan (born 4 August 1946) is an Indian Senior Advocate, a human rights activist, and a Commissioner of the International Commission of Jurists. He is the author or co-author of numerous books on legal and human rights topics, and is a regular columnist in the leading newspapers in India. He is the son of the late diplomat and jurist Shanti Swaroop Dhavan.

Dhavan led the attorney team for the Muslims in the famous Babri Masjid case.

== Career ==
Rajeev Dhavan did his schooling from Boys' High School and College and Sherwood College, Nainital. He studied law at Allahabad University, then at Emmanuel College, Cambridge (where he was elected President of the Cambridge Union) and London University. He has taught at Queen's University Belfast, Brunel University, the University of Wisconsin–Madison and the University of Texas at Austin. He is an Honorary Professor at the Indian Law Institute.

Dhavan is a senior advocate of the Supreme Court of India, as he was designated in 1994. He runs the Public Interest Legal Support and Research Centre, which tries to make youth aware of constitutional and legal subjects. Dhavan was elected to the International Commission of Jurists in 1998 and was a member of the Executive Committee between 2003 and 2007 and from 2009. He was appointed the chairperson of the Executive Committee in 2009.

In March 2003, Dhavan was a signatory to a statement that condemned the American-led invasion of Iraq and called it "unprovoked, unjustified and violative of international law and the United Nations Charter". Other signatories included Rajinder Sachar, Shanti Bhushan, Pavani Parameswara Rao, Kapil Sibal and Prashant Bhushan.

Dhavan has represented the Babri Masjid Action Committee before the Allahabad High Court over the title to the land on which the mosque stood before being destroyed by a mob in 1992. When the Allahabad High Court ruled that the site should be divided between Hindus and Muslims, Dhavan said, "This is Panchayati justice which takes away the legal rights of Muslims and converts the moral sentimental entitlements of Hindus into legal rights". Dhavan also called the tone of the judges as aggressive during the hearing, but later apologized by stating that he had been emotionally carried away during the hearing.

== Bibliography ==
- Rajeev Dhavan (1972). Juristic Techniques in the Supreme Court of India 1950-1971 in Some Selected Areas of Public and Personal Law. p. 1454.
- Rajeev Dhavan (1976). Black People in Britain, the Way Forward: A Report of a Conference Held [In Bloomsbury Hotel, London] 17-19 January 1975. The Committee. p. 227. ISBN 0-9505659-0-3.
- Rajeev Dhavan (1976). The Supreme Court of India and parliamentary sovereignty: a critique of its approach to the recent constitutional crisis. Sterling Publishers. p. 404.
- Rajeev Dhavan (1977). The Supreme Court of India: A Socio-legal Critique of Its Juristic Techniques. N. M. Tripathi. p. 524.
- Rajeev Dhavan; Alice Jacob (1978). Selection and appointment of Supreme Court judges: a case study. N.M. Tripathi. p. 125.
- Rajeev Dhavan (1978). The amendment: conspiracy or revolution?. Wheeler. p. 235.
- Rajeev Dhavan; P. Kalpakam (1978). The Supreme Court under strain: the challenge of arrears. Tripathi. p. 164.
- Rajeev Dhavan; Christie Davies (1978). Censorship and obscenity. Rowman and Littlefield. p. 187. ISBN 0-8476-6054-0.
- Rajeev Dhavan (1979). President's rule in the states. N. M. Tripathi. p. 240.
- Rajeev Dhavan (1980). Justice on trial: the Supreme Court today. Wheeler. p. 292.
- Rajeev Dhavan (1982). Contempt of Court and the Press. N.M. Tripathi. p. 280.
- V. R. Krishna Iyer; Rajeev Dhavan; Salman Khurshid (1985). Judges and the judicial power: essays in honour of Justice V.R. Krishna Iyer. Sweet & Maxwell. p. 340. ISBN 0-421-28860-4.
- Rajeev Dhavan (1986). Litigation explosion in India. N.M. Tripathi. p. 179.
- Jeremy Cooper (1986). Jeremy Cooper; Rajeev Dhavan (eds.). Public Interest Law. Basil Blackwell. p. 482. ISBN 0-631-14299-1.
- Rajeev Dhavan (1987). Only the Good News: On the Law of the Press in India. Manohar Publications. p. 514. ISBN 81-85054-38-X.
- Rajeev Dhavan; William L. Twining; Neil Kibble (1989). Access to legal education and the legal profession. Butterworths. p. 343. ISBN 0-406-70065-6.
- Marc Galanter; Rajeev Dhavan (1989). Law and Society in Modern India. Oxford University Press. pp. 329. ISBN 0-19-562294-4.
- Rajeev Dhavan (2004). Refugee Law and Policy in India. PILSARC. p. 164.
- Rajeev Dhavan (2008). Reserved!: How Parliament Debated Reservations 1995-2007. Rupa & Company. p. 319. ISBN 978-81-291-1369-6.
- Rajeev Dhavan (2008). Publish and be Damned: Censorship and Intolerance in India. Tulika Books. p. 312. ISBN 978-81-89487-45-4.
- Rajeev Dhavan (1984). Legitimating Government Rhetoric: Reflections on Some Aspects of the Report of the Second Press Commission. Journal of the Indian Law Institute. pp. 391–423. Source: https://www.jstor.org/stable/43950943
