= 2002 in India =

- Centuries: 19th; 20th; 21st
- Decades: 1980s; 1990s; 2000s; 2010s; 2020s
- See also: List of years in India; Timeline of Indian history

Events in the year 2002 in the Republic of India.

== Incumbents ==
- President of India – K.R. Narayanan to 25 July A. P. J. Abdul Kalam
- Prime Minister of India – Atal Bihari Vajpayee
- Vice President of India –
  - Krishna Kant(till 27 July)
  - Bhairon Singh Shekhawat(from 19 August)
- Chief Justice of India –
  - until 6 May – Sam Piroj Bharucha
  - 6 May – 8 November – Bhupinder Nath Kirpal
  - 8 November – 19 December – Gopal Ballav Pattanaik
  - starting 19 December – V. N. Khare

=== Governors ===
- Andhra Pradesh – C. Rangarajan
- Arunachal Pradesh – Arvind Dave
- Assam – Srinivas Kumar Sinha
- Bihar – V. C. Pande
- Chhattisgarh – D. N. Sahay
- Goa – Mohammed Fazal (until 25 October), Kidar Nath Sahani (starting 25 October)
- Gujarat – Sunder Singh Bhandari
- Haryana – Babu Parmanand
- Himachal Pradesh – Suraj Bhan
- Jharkhand –
  - until 3 February: Prabhat Kumar
  - 3 February-14 July: V. C. Pande
  - starting 14 July: M. Rama Jois
- Jammu and Kashmir – Girish Chandra Saxena
- Karnataka – V. S. Ramadevi (until 20 August), T. N. Chaturvedi (starting 20 August)
- Kerala – Sukhdev Singh Kang (until 18 April), Sikander Bakht (starting 18 April)
- Madhya Pradesh – Bhai Mahavir
- Maharashtra – P.C. Alexander (until 13 July), Mohammed Fazal (starting 13 July)
- Manipur – Ved Marwah
- Meghalaya – M.M. Jacob
- Mizoram – Amolak Rattan Kohli
- Nagaland – Om Prakash Sharma (until 27 January), Shyamal Datta (starting 28 January)
- Odisha – M. M. Rajendran
- Punjab – J. F. R. Jacob
- Rajasthan – Anshuman Singh
- Sikkim – Kidar Nath Sahani (until 25 October), V. Rama Rao (starting 25 October)
- Tamil Nadu – C. Rangarajan (until 17 January), P. S. Ramamohan Rao (starting 17 January)
- Tripura – Krishna Mohan Seth
- Uttar Pradesh – Vishnu Kant Shastri
- Uttarakhand – Surjit Singh Barnala
- West Bengal – Viren J. Shah

== Events ==
- National income - ₹24,926,138 million

=== January - March ===
- 9 January – The government announces that it is laying landmines along the entire length of its 2,800-km border with Pakistan.
- 10 January – 800 protesters are arrested in a large-scale illegal protest against the Communist government of West Bengal, which brings the state to a standstill. The authorities there had outlawed "disruptive" protests at the end of 2001.
- Mid-January – Direct flights to China are set to resume for the first time in 40 years after diplomatic talks between the two countries.
- 16 January – Archaeologists announce the discovery of ancient man-made structures off the Gujarati coast which could be as many as 9,500 years old – 5,500 years older than the ancient Harappan civilisation whose remains are found around the same region.
- 22 January – Five policemen are killed and 20 other people injured when Islamic militants attack an American cultural centre in Kolkata. Police arrest at least 50 suspects in the wake of the incident. The government immediately accuses its Pakistani counterpart of involvement in the attack.
- Late January – The government is roundly criticised for testing a short-range version of its Agni ballistic missile on 25 January, the day before the country's Republic Day, at a time when military tensions with Pakistan remain high.
- 3 February – Russia gives its full backing to India over the Kashmir dispute with neighbouring Pakistan.
- Mid-February – The Cellular Operators Association announces that the ownership of mobile phones in India rocketed by 75% in the previous year. Almost 6 million Indians now own mobile phones.
- 24 February – The Bharatiya Janata Party (BJP) loses control of state governments in Uttar Pradesh, Punjab, and Uttaranchal (now known as Uttarakhand) according to election results released this day. The BJP is expected to retain a role in a coalition in U.P. (the most populous state in India), whereas the Punjab and Uttaranchal state legislatures are now dominated by the opposition Congress party.
- 27 February – One of the worst violence unleashed against Muslims after 59 Hindu pilgrims killed aboard a fire in a train allegedly started by a local Muslim mob in Godhra.
- 28 February –
  - 2002 Gujarat violence: Three day violence against Muslim community in the city of Ahmedabad, Gujarat and surroundings begins leaving over 500 dead. The violence came after the death the previous day of 58 who died in Godhra, near Vadodara (the exact circumstances remain unclear).
  - Gulbarg Society massacre: During the 2002 Gujarat riots, a mob attacked the Gulbarag Society, a lower-middle-class neighborhood in Chamanpura, Ahmedabad. Most of the houses were burnt, and at least 35 victims including a former Congress Member of Parliament Ehsan Jafri, were burnt alive, while 31 others went missing after the incident, later presumed dead, bringing the total of the dead to 69.
  - Naroda Patiya massacre.
  - Finance Minister Yashwant Sinha presents the 2002–03 budget. Amongst its major features are a 4.8% increase in defence spending and a 5% surcharge on income tax to pay for this.
- 1 March – Continuing violence in Ahmedabad kills 28; police shoot and kill 5 rioters.
- 2 March – J. Jayalalithaa returns to power in Tamil Nadu as chief minister. In December 2001, an appeals court had quashed her October 2000 corruption conviction that disqualified her from standing for election.
- 3 March – The speaker of the Lok Sabha, Ganti Mohana Chandra Balayogi, died in a helicopter crash in the southern state of Andhra Pradesh. He was the first low-caste Dalit to be elected to the post.
- 4 March Bilkis Bano case
- 6 March – Novelist Arundhati Roy, a high-profile campaigner against the Narmada River dams project, is sentenced by the Supreme Court to one day in prison for contempt of court because of an affidavit she had written criticising the court.
- 8 March – President's rule is imposed on the northern state of Uttar Pradesh as no party could command a majority after the recent elections.
- 15 March – 9,000 suspected Hindu hardliners are arrested, including 8,000 in Mumbai alone, in a massive crackdown aimed at preventing further interreligious violence. Tensions are high surrounding attempts to construct a new Hindu temple on the site of the Ayodhya mosque, which was destroyed by Hindu extremists in 1992.
- 15 March – The New Delhi High Court overturns the October 2000 corruption conviction of former prime minister P.V. Narasimha Rao.
- 25 March – Police arrest Yasin Malik, leader of the separatist Jammu and Kashmir Liberation Front (JKLF), in Srinagar.
- 26 March – The government pushes through its controversial Prevention of Terrorism Ordinance (POTO) bill in a rare joint session of both houses of parliament, only the third since independence. In separate sessions, the Lok Sabha had passed the bill on 18 March but it was defeated in the Rajya Sabha on 21 March.

=== April - June ===
- 4 April – On his first visit to Gujarat since the violence there began, (See 2002 Gujarat violence) Prime Minister Vajpayee makes an impassioned speech appealing to the Hindu and Muslim communities to end the violence, saying that the "shameful events" in Gujarat are a "blot" on India.
- 16 April – Up to 10 million public sector workers, including 32,000 employees of state-owned banks, hold a one-day strike against government privatisation plans.
- 18 April – India signs a deal to buy a $146 million weapon-seeking radar system built by the U.S. company Raytheon. It is the first significant U.S. arms sale to India for a decade.
- 29 April – Minister for Coal and Mines Ram Vilas Paswan resigns on the issue of the Gujarat violence, which he says has "tarnished India's image" while the government's role appears to be that of a "silent spectator". He pulls his Lok Janshakti Party out of the ruling National Democratic Alliance coalition.
- 3 May – The stalemate in Uttar Pradesh is resolved when Mayawati of the Bahujan Samaj Party is sworn in as chief minister, in a coalition with the BJP.
- 10 May – Manohar Joshi of the Shiv Sena party is elected speaker of the Lok Sabha.
- 14 May – An attack by militants on an army base in Kashmir, in which 34 people are killed, leads to sharply rising tensions with Pakistan. On 15 May, Vajpayee says in the Lok Sabha: "We will have to retaliate." Fears increase that the situation might escalate into a nuclear exchange.
- 21 May – Moderate Kashmiri separatist leader Abdul Ghani Lone is assassinated. On the same day Vajpayee begins a five-day visit to Kashmir. In a martial speech on 22 May, he says that "a new chapter of victory and triumph will be written in the history books soon".
- 23 May – Indian paratroops complete a two-week exercise with U.S. forces south of New Delhi.
- 31 May – Both the UK Foreign and Commonwealth Office and the U.S. State Department issue unprecedented advice to their citizens living in India to leave the country.
- 2002 heatwave in India
- June – Tensions between India and Pakistan are reduced largely as a result of international pressure. Pakistani President Pervez Musharraf assures visiting U.S. Deputy Secretary of State Richard Armitage that the cessation of cross-border infiltration will be made "permanent" and "irreversible". On 20 June, Indian Defense Minister George Fernandes says that infiltration has "nearly ended". Analysts note, however, that some 3,000 indigenous and Pakistani militants are already inside Indian-controlled Kashmir, and violent incidents continue on a daily basis. On 9 June police in Srinagar arrest Syed Ali Shah Geelani, leader of the hardline Islamist Jamaat-i-Islami party and a prominent leader of the All Parties Hurriyat Conference.
- 22 June – Ashok Singhal, leader of the Vishwa Hindu Parishad (VHP), announces that the VHP is no longer bound by its earlier promise to the government to await a court ruling before embarking on the construction of a temple to the god Rama on the site of the destroyed Babri mosque at Ayodhya.

=== July - December ===
- 1 July – Foreign Minister Jaswant Singh and Finance Minister Yashwant Sinha exchange their portfolios in a cabinet reshuffle. The BJP installs Venkaiah Naidu as party president, replacing Jana Krishnamurthi who becomes Union Law Minister.
- 15 July – An electoral college composed of the members of both houses of the federal parliament and of all state assemblies elects A.P.J. Abdul Kalam, a Muslim and prominent missile scientist, president of India. He was supported by the ruling NDA coalition as well as the opposition Congress and most other parties.
- 27 July – Vice President Krishan Kant dies of a heart attack.
- 12 August – Bhairon Singh Shekhawat is elected vice president.
- 25 August – Notorious bandit Veerappan abducts a former minister of Karnataka, Hannur Nagappa, threatening to behead him unless the state governments of Karnataka and neighbouring Tamil Nadu release imprisoned Tamil separatists.
- 28 August – Chief magistrate Rameshwar Kotha of the Bhopal High Court rejects the federal Central Bureau of Investigation's attempt to reduce charges against the former chairman of the U.S. Union Carbide company, Warren Anderson, for responsibility for the 1984 chemical plant disaster at Bhopal. Kotha asks the government to bring extradition proceedings without delay, but it is thought that the government is reluctant to do so for fear of alienating the U.S. business community.
- 9 September – At least 119 people are killed in a train crash in the northeastern state of Bihar when part of the Rajdhani Express from Kolkata to New Delhi derails on a bridge over the Dhava river near Aurangabad.
- 16 September and 24, 1 and 8 October – Elections are held in the state of Jammu and Kashmir amid an atmosphere of escalating violence. The result is a surprising defeat of the National Conference, which was the dominant political force in the state for over 40 years. A government is formed by the People's Democratic Party and the Congress. PDP leader Mufti Mohammad Sayeed is to be the Chief Minister of Jammu and Kashmir for three years, followed by Ghulam Nabi Azad of the Congress for another three years.
- 24 – 25 September – Two heavily armed gunmen kill at least 32 people in an attack on a Hindu temple in Gandhinagar, the capital of Gujarat, before army commandos recapture the temple and kill the terrorists.
- 27 September – Sukhoi 30 MKI was inducted in Indian Air Force.
- 10 October – Mohammad Fazal is appointed Governor of Maharashtra.
- Mufti Mohammad Sayeed is sworn in as the Chief Minister of Jammu and Kashmir.
- 16 October – Defense Minister George Fernandes announces that a significant number of the million troops deployed since December 2001 on the border with Pakistan will be withdrawn. However, there will be no reduction in strength along the Line of Control in Kashmir.
- 3 November - Two alleged militants died in a fake encounter in Ansal Plaza, Delhi.
- 15 November – A court in New Delhi finds that there is sufficient evidence to prosecute the UK based businessmen and brothers Shrichand, Gopichand, and Prakash Hinduja for cheating, conspiracy, and abetting corruption in the 1986 arms procurement scandal between India and the Swedish arms manufacturer Bofors.
- 3 – 5 December – Russian President Vladimir Putin visits India, holding talks with Prime Minister Vajpayee and other senior ministers.
- 8 December – Police confirm they have found the body of H. Nagappa, the former Karnataka minister kidnapped by Veerappan in August. Veerappan issues a taped statement saying that Nagappa has been accidentally killed in a shootout with the police.
- 12 December – The Bharatiya Janata Party (BJP) is returned to power with a landslide victory in state assembly elections in Gujarat.
- 16 December – A special court in New Delhi convicts three Kashmiri Muslims of planning the attack on the federal parliament in December 2001. The three men are sentenced to death on 18 December.
- 20 December – Guerrillas of the Maoist Communist Centre (MCC) kill 18 people in an attack on a police van in the Sanda forests of the eastern state of Jharkhand. It is said to be a revenge attack for the death two days earlier of the MCC leader Ishwari Mahato.
- 22 December – Narendra Modi is sworn in as the Chief Minister of Gujarat for the second time.
- 24 December – Prime Minister Vajpayee opens the first stretch of Delhi's new metro system.

== Births ==
- 18 February – Manu Bhaker, Indian Olympian.
- 18 February - Bharani Bahhe, Polyglot, Influencer.

=== Full date unknown ===
- Hridayeshwar Singh Bhati, inventor
- Budhia Singh, marathon

== Deaths ==
- 4 February – Bhagwan Dada, actor and film director (b. 1913).
- 19 February – Karim Lala, Indian mobster (b. 1911)
- 23 March – Piara Singh Gill, physicist (b. 1911).
- 25 April – Prameela Devi, actress (b. 1943).
- 10 May – Kaifi Azmi, Urdu poet (b. 1919)
- 6 July – Dhirubhai Ambani, business tycoon (b. 1933).
- 27 July – Krishan Kant, politician, Vice President of India (b. 1927).
- 24 September – Pisharoth Rama Pisharoty, physicist and meteorologist (b. 1909).
- 11 October – Dina Pathak, actress and activist (b. 1922).
- 7 December – N. Krishnaswami Reddy, lawyer (b. 1913).

== See also ==
- Bollywood films of 2002
