= First Lalu Prasad Yadav ministry =

Government of Bihar, India (1990–1995)

- 25th Ministry of Bihar

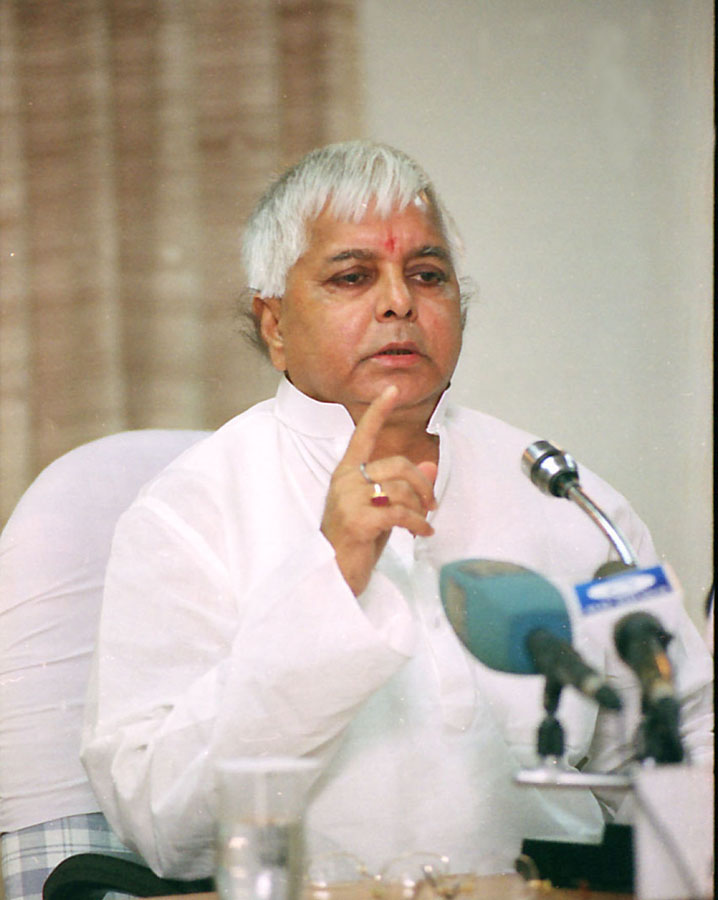
- Date formed: 10 March 1990
- Date dissolved: 28 March 1995

People and organisations
- Governor: Mohammad Yunus Saleem; B. Satya Narayan Reddy; Mohammad Shafi Qureshi; A. R. Kidwai
- Chief Minister: Lalu Prasad Yadav
- Member parties: JD: IND
- Status in legislature: Coalition
- Opposition party: INC; BJP; SAP
- Opposition leader: Jagannath Mishra

History
- Election: 1990
- Legislature terms: 5 years, 18 days
- Predecessor: Third Mishra ministry
- Successor: Second Lalu ministry

The First Lalu Prasad Yadav ministry was the 25th Council of Ministers in Bihar Legislative Assembly headed by Chief Minister Lalu Prasad Yadav.

== Council of Ministers ==
The following is the list of ministers and their portfolios in the first Lalu Prasad Yadav ministry.

Cabinet
Portfolio	Minister	Took office	Left office	Party
Chief Minister; Home Affairs; General Administration; Cabinet Secretariat; Vigilance; Election; Other departments not allotted to any Minister	Lalu Prasad Yadav	10 March 1990	28 March 1995	JD
Finance & Commercial Taxes	-	10 March 1990	28 March 1995	
Minister of Parliamentary Affairs	-	10 March 1990	28 March 1995	
Minister of Water Resources	-	10 March 1990	28 March 1995	
Minister of Agriculture	-	10 March 1990	28 March 1995	
Minister of Education	-	10 March 1990	28 March 1995	
Minister of Building Construction	-	10 March 1990	28 March 1995	
Minister of Revenue & Land Reforms	-	10 March 1990	28 March 1995	
Minister of Road Construction	-	10 March 1990	28 March 1995	
Minister of Tourism	-	10 March 1990	28 March 1995	
Minister of Health & Family Welfare	-	10 March 1990	28 March 1995	
Minister of Public Health Engineering Department	-	10 March 1990	28 March 1995	
Minister of Urban Development & Housing	-	10 March 1990	28 March 1995	
Minister of Art, Culture, Youth Affairs & Sports	-	10 March 1990	28 March 1995	
Minister of Energy	-	10 March 1990	28 March 1995	
Minister of Excise & Prohibition	-	10 March 1990	28 March 1995	
Minister of Panchayat Raj	-	10 March 1990	28 March 1995	
Minister of Rural Development	-	10 March 1990	28 March 1995	
Minister of Environment & Forest	-	10 March 1990	28 March 1995	
Minister of Co-operatives	-	10 March 1990	28 March 1995	
Minister of Food & Civil Supplies	-	10 March 1990	28 March 1995	
Minister of Transport	-	10 March 1990	28 March 1995	
Minister of Science & Technology	-	10 March 1990	28 March 1995	
Minister of Industry	-	10 March 1990	28 March 1995	
Minister of Minority Welfare	-	10 March 1990	28 March 1995	
Minister of Information & Public Relations	-	10 March 1990	28 March 1995	
Minister of Minor Irrigation	-	10 March 1990	28 March 1995	
Minister of Sugarcane Industries	-	10 March 1990	28 March 1995	
Minister of Social Welfare	-	10 March 1990	28 March 1995	
Minister of Planning & Development	-	10 March 1990	28 March 1995	
Minister of Law & Justice	-	10 March 1990	28 March 1995	
Minister of Schedule Caste Welfare	-	10 March 1990	28 March 1995	
Minister of Extremely Backward Class Welfare	-	10 March 1990	28 March 1995	
Minister of Animal Husbandry & Fisheries	-	10 March 1990	28 March 1995	
Minister of Labour & Employment	-	10 March 1990	28 March 1995	
Minister of Information Technology	-	10 March 1990	28 March 1995	
Minister of Mining & Geology	-	10 March 1990	28 March 1995	
Minister of Disaster Management	-	10 March 1990	28 March 1995	
Minister of state in Health & Family Welfare	-	10 March 1990	28 March 1995	
