= Nagpada Assembly constituency =

Constituency of the Maharashtra legislative assembly in India

Nagpada
- Former constituency for the Maharashtra Legislative Assembly

Constituency details
- Country: India
- Region: Western India
- State: Maharashtra
- Lok Sabha constituency: Mumbai South
- Established: 1957
- Abolished: 2008

Nagpada Assembly constituency was one of the 288 assembly constituencies of Maharashtra a western state of India. Nagpada was also part of Mumbai South Lok Sabha constituency. Nagpada existed till 2004 elections until Byculla Assembly constituency was formed in 2008.

== Member of Legislative Assembly ==
Year	Member	Party
1957	Safia Zubair	Indian National Congress
1962	Vishwanath Rajanna Tulla	Indian National Congress
1967	S. A. Usman	Indian National Congress
1972	Kazi Umar Abdul Aziz	Indian National Congress
1978	Dr. Ishaq Jamkhanawala Abedin	Janata Party
1980	Dr. Syed Ahmed	Indian National Congress
1985	Dr. Syed Ahmed	Indian National Congress
1990	Dr. Syed Ahmed	Indian National Congress
1995	Lokhandwala Suhail Haji Umer	Samajwadi Party
1999	Dr. Syed Ahmed	Indian National Congress
2004	Dr. Syed Ahmed	Indian National Congress

== Election results ==
=== Assembly Election 2004 ===
2004 Maharashtra Legislative Assembly election : Nagpada
Party	Candidate	Votes	%	±%
INC	Dr. Syed Ahmed (politician)	20,869	45.02%	▲8.47
SS	Yashwant Jadhav	17,095	36.88%	▲9.70
SP	Lokhandwala Suhail Haji Umer	5,505	11.88%	▼20.51
ABS	Dhanji Mahida	1,999	4.31%	New
BSP	Bhagwan Ramdas Tambe	464	1.00%	New
Independent	Bhagwansingh Bapsingh Thakur	286	0.62%	New
Margin of victory		3,774	8.14%	▲3.98
Turnout		46,355	44.06%	▲2.38
Total valid votes		46,355		
Registered electors		1,05,220		▼14.42
INC hold		Swing	▲8.47	

=== Assembly Election 1999 ===
1999 Maharashtra Legislative Assembly election : Nagpada
Party	Candidate	Votes	%	±%
INC	Sayyed Ahmed Alinki	18,725	36.55%	▲16.24
SP	Abrani Yusuf	16,595	32.39%	▼1.21
SS	Dilip Balaram Tammal	13,923	27.18%	▼3.07
IUML	Mujawar Yusuf Husen	1,004	1.96%	New
Bharatiya Minorities Suraksha Mahasangh	Shaikh Nizamuddin Mahamed Akber	496	0.97%	New
Independent	Y. A. Naik	491	0.96%	New
Margin of victory		2,130	4.16%	▲0.80
Turnout		51,240	41.68%	▼14.91
Total valid votes		51,234		
Registered electors		1,22,946		▲1.20
INC gain from SP		Swing	▲2.95	

=== Assembly Election 1995 ===
1995 Maharashtra Legislative Assembly election : Nagpada
Party	Candidate	Votes	%	±%
SP	Lokhandwala Suhail Haji Umer	23,099	33.60%	New
SS	Dilip Balaram Tammal	20,793	30.24%	▲5.14
INC	Dr. Syed Ahmed (politician)	13,963	20.31%	▼12.23
JD	Kazi Nazim A. Hamid	7,519	10.94%	▲2.45
Samajwadi Janata Party (Maharashtra)	Lakeshree Rajendra Shankar	1,338	1.95%	New
JP	Anopsingh Deol	707	1.03%	New
Margin of victory		2,306	3.35%	▲0.94
Turnout		69,876	57.52%	▲5.17
Total valid votes		68,749		
Registered electors		1,21,490		▼3.32
SP gain from INC		Swing	▲1.06	

=== Assembly Election 1990 ===
1990 Maharashtra Legislative Assembly election : Nagpada
Party	Candidate	Votes	%	±%
INC	Dr. Syed Ahmed (politician)	21,026	32.54%	▼16.10
AIML	Yusuf Husain Mujawar	19,467	30.13%	New
SS	Anjum Ahmed	16,225	25.11%	New
JD	Syed Afroj Ali	5,487	8.49%	New
INS(SCS)	Salim Ibraheem	1,134	1.75%	New
Margin of victory		1,559	2.41%	▼17.90
Turnout		65,510	52.13%	▲9.40
Total valid votes		64,620		
Registered electors		1,25,666		▲27.92
INC hold		Swing	▼16.10	

=== Assembly Election 1985 ===
1985 Maharashtra Legislative Assembly election : Nagpada
Party	Candidate	Votes	%	±%
INC	Dr. Syed Ahmed (politician)	20,081	48.64%	New
IC(S)	Dr. Ishaq Jamkhanawala Abedin	11,695	28.33%	New
Independent	Sarfaraz Arzu	5,089	12.33%	New
Independent	Diwar Manohar Tukaram	2,994	7.25%	New
Independent	Divakar Mahadev Natu	417	1.01%	New
Margin of victory		8,386	20.31%	▼16.17
Turnout		41,891	42.64%	▲12.43
Total valid votes		41,284		
Registered electors		98,237		▼6.16
INC gain from INC(I)		Swing	▼9.37	

=== Assembly Election 1980 ===
1980 Maharashtra Legislative Assembly election : Nagpada
Party	Candidate	Votes	%	±%
INC(I)	Dr. Syed Ahmed (politician)	17,975	58.01%	▲36.78
JP	Adam Adil	6,670	21.53%	▼33.42
AIML	Syed Suhali Ashraf	6,072	19.60%	New
Independent	Ishtiaque Ahmad	269	0.87%	New
Margin of victory		11,305	36.48%	▲4.58
Turnout		31,463	30.06%	▼25.70
Total valid votes		30,986		
Registered electors		1,04,684		▼1.88
INC(I) gain from JP		Swing	▲3.07	

=== Assembly Election 1978 ===
1978 Maharashtra Legislative Assembly election : Nagpada
Party	Candidate	Votes	%	±%
JP	Dr. Ishaq Jamkhanawala Abedin	32,416	54.94%	New
INC	Kazi Umar Abdul Aziz	13,594	23.04%	▼14.02
INC(I)	Ahmed Sayed Alinaki	12,528	21.23%	New
Independent	Shaikh Hasanmiyan Fakir Mohamad	364	0.62%	New
Margin of victory		18,822	31.90%	▲28.79
Turnout		60,139	56.37%	▼9.36
Total valid votes		58,999		
Registered electors		1,06,695		▲20.05
JP gain from INC		Swing	▲17.89	

=== Assembly Election 1972 ===
1972 Maharashtra Legislative Assembly election : Nagpada
Party	Candidate	Votes	%	±%
INC	Kazi Umar Abdul Aziz	21,293	37.06%	▲1.22
Independent	Khwaja Gulam Jilani	19,502	33.94%	New
ABJS	Parab Vamanrao Ganpatrao	11,374	19.79%	▲1.86
Independent	Shinde Manohar Shankarrao	4,163	7.24%	New
RPI(K)	S. M. Mohamed Mahmood	786	1.37%	New
Margin of victory		1,791	3.12%	▼6.78
Turnout		58,676	66.02%	▲4.54
Total valid votes		57,461		
Registered electors		88,875		▲4.68
INC hold		Swing	▲1.22	

=== Assembly Election 1967 ===
1967 Maharashtra Legislative Assembly election : Nagpada
Party	Candidate	Votes	%	±%
INC	S. A. Usman	18,292	35.84%	▼3.98
Independent	F. M. Hanif Hanif	13,240	25.94%	New
ABJS	G. S. Bhowar	9,155	17.94%	▲6.75
Independent	T. V. Rajanna	6,383	12.51%	New
Independent	D. P. Kamble	2,404	4.71%	New
SWA	F. R. Abdulbari	1,568	3.07%	New
Margin of victory		5,052	9.90%	▼1.31
Turnout		54,121	63.74%	▲2.86
Total valid votes		51,042		
Registered electors		84,903		▲9.83
INC hold		Swing	▼3.98	

=== Assembly Election 1962 ===
1962 Maharashtra Legislative Assembly election : Nagpada
Party	Candidate	Votes	%	±%
INC	Vishwanath Rajanna Tulla	17,625	39.82%	▼7.96
Independent	Mahmood Mahomed Mulla	12,664	28.61%	New
CPI	Sultana Begam Ali Sardar Jafri	9,024	20.39%	New
ABJS	Vyankatrajayya Kishtayya Chowki	4,950	11.18%	New
Margin of victory		4,961	11.21%	▲4.94
Turnout		45,921	59.40%	▼6.81
Total valid votes		44,263		
Registered electors		77,302		▲25.34
INC hold		Swing	▼7.96	

=== Assembly Election 1957 ===
1957 Bombay State Legislative Assembly election : Nagpada
Party	Candidate	Votes	%	±%
INC	Safia Zubair	18,877	47.78%	New
Independent	Tulla Vishwanath Rajanna	16,401	41.51%	New
Independent	D' Mello Placid Raymond	4,234	10.72%	New
Margin of victory		2,476	6.27%	
Turnout		39,512	64.07%	
Total valid votes		39,512		
Registered electors		61,674		
INC win (new seat)				

== See also ==
https://resultuniversity.com/election/nagpada-maharashtra-assembly-constituency
