= Lok Bhavan, Dumka =

Second Residence of the Governor of Jharkhand

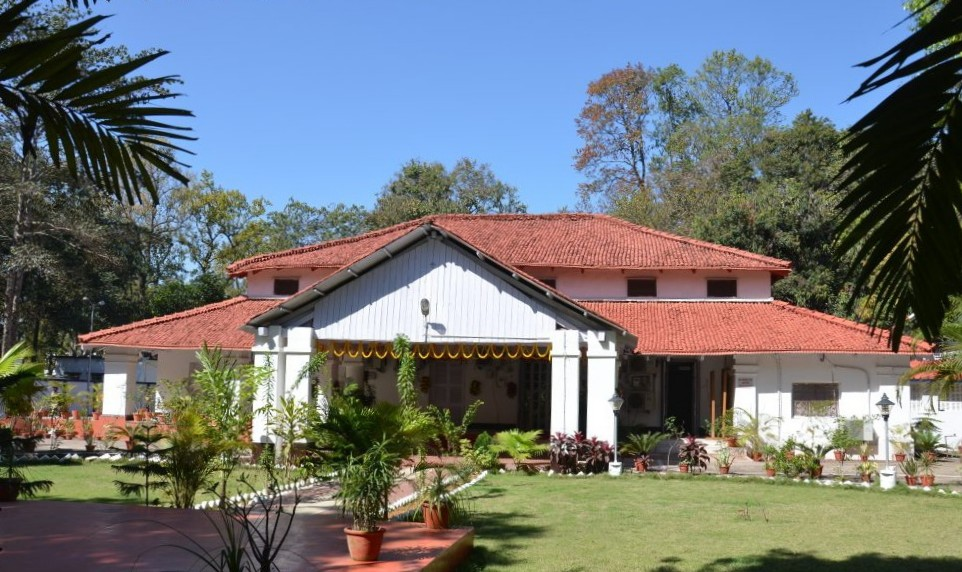
- Interactive map of the Lok Bhavan, Dumka area

General information
- Coordinates: 24.253216°N 87.252614°E
- Current tenants: Santosh Gangwar
- Owner: Government of Jharkhand

References
- Website

Lok Bhavan, Dumka, formerly Raj Bhavan, Dumka (translation: Government House), is the second official residence of the Governor of Jharkhand. It is located in Dumka, the sub-capital of Jharkhand. The residence is currently occupied by governor Santosh Gangwar.

== See also ==
- Government Houses of the British Indian Empire
- Lok Bhavan, Ranchi
