= Second Lalu Prasad Yadav ministry =

Government of Bihar, India (1995–1997)

- 26th Ministry of Bihar

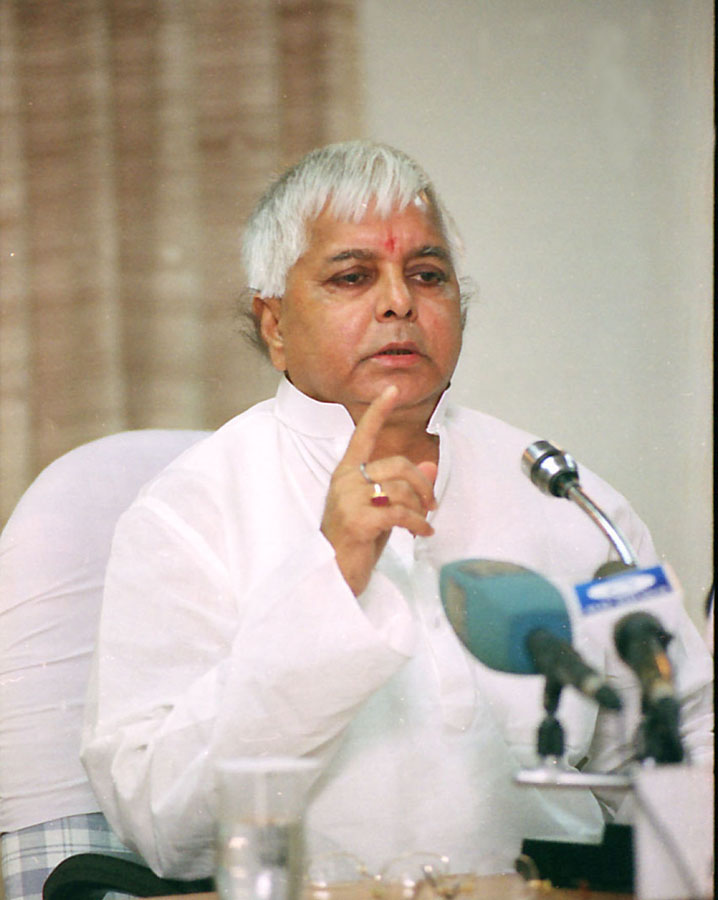
- Date formed: 4 April 1995
- Date dissolved: 25 July 1997

People and organisations
- Governor: A. R. Kidwai
- Chief Minister: Lalu Prasad Yadav
- Member parties: RJD: IND
- Status in legislature: Coalition
- Opposition party: BJP; Samata Party
- Opposition leader: Sushil Modi

History
- Election: 1995
- Legislature terms: 2 years, 112 days
- Predecessor: First Lalu ministry
- Successor: First Rabri ministry

The Second Lalu Prasad Yadav ministry was the 26th Council of Ministers in Bihar Legislative Assembly headed by Chief Minister Lalu Prasad Yadav.

== Council of Ministers ==
Cabinet members
Portfolio	Minister	Took office	Left office	Party
Chief Minister; Home Affairs; General Administration; Cabinet Secretariat; Vigilance; Election; Other departments not allotted to any Minister	Lalu Prasad Yadav	4 April 1995	25 July 1997	RJD
Finance & Commercial Taxes	-	4 April 1995	25 July 1997	
Minister of Parliamentary Affairs	-	4 April 1995	25 July 1997	
Minister of Water Resources	-	4 April 1995	25 July 1997	
Minister of Agriculture	-	4 April 1995	25 July 1997	
Minister of Education	-	4 April 1995	25 July 1997	
Minister of Building Construction	-	4 April 1995	25 July 1997	
Minister of Revenue & Land Reforms	-	4 April 1995	25 July 1997	
Minister of Road Construction	-	4 April 1995	25 July 1997	
Minister of Tourism	-	4 April 1995	25 July 1997	
Minister of Health & Family Welfare	-	4 April 1995	25 July 1997	
Minister of Public Health Engineering Department	-	4 April 1995	25 July 1997	
Minister of Urban Development & Housing	'	4 April 1995	25 July 1997	
Minister of Art, Culture, Youth Affairs & Sports	-	4 April 1995	25 July 1997	
Minister of Energy	-	4 April 1995	25 July 1997	
Minister of Excise & Prohibition	-	4 April 1995	25 July 1997	
Minister of Panchayat Raj	-	4 April 1995	25 July 1997	
Minister of Rural Development	-	4 April 1995	25 July 1997	
Minister of Environment & Forest	-	4 April 1995	25 July 1997	
Minister of Co-operatives	-	4 April 1995	25 July 1997	
Minister of Food & Civil Supplies	-	4 April 1995	25 July 1997	
Minister of Transport	-	4 April 1995	25 July 1997	
Minister of Science & Technology	-	4 April 1995	25 July 1997	
Minister of Industry	-	4 April 1995	25 July 1997	
Minister of Minority Welfare	-	4 April 1995	25 July 1997	
Minister of Information & Public Relations	-	4 April 1995	25 July 1997	
Minister of Minor Irrigation	-	4 April 1995	25 July 1997	
Minister of Sugarcane Industries	-	4 April 1995	25 July 1997	
Minister of Social Welfare	-	4 April 1995	25 July 1997	
Minister of Planning & Development	-	4 April 1995	25 July 1997	
Minister of Law & Justice	-	4 April 1995	25 July 1997	
Minister of Schedule Caste Welfare	-	4 April 1995	25 July 1997	
Minister of Extremely Backward Class Welfare	-	4 April 1995	25 July 1997	
Minister of Animal Husbandry & Fisheries	-	4 April 1995	25 July 1997	
Minister of Labour & Employment	-	4 April 1995	25 July 1997	
Minister of Information Technology	-	4 April 1995	25 July 1997	
Minister of Mining & Geology	-	4 April 1995	25 July 1997	
Minister of Disaster Management	-	4 April 1995	25 July 1997	
Minister of state in Health & Family Welfare	-	4 April 1995	25 July 1997	
