= Syed Ahmed (politician) =

Governor of Jharkhand, Indian politician, author (1945–2015)

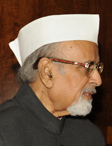
- Syed Ahmed in August 2014

15th Governor of Manipur
- In office 16 May 2015 – 27 September 2015
- Chief Minister: Okram Ibobi Singh
- Preceded by: Krishan Kant Paul
- Succeeded by: V. Shanmuganathan

7th Governor of Jharkhand
- In office 4 September 2011 – 15 May 2015
- Chief Minister: Arjun Munda; Hemant Soren; Raghubar Das
- Preceded by: M. O. H. Farook
- Succeeded by: Draupadi Murmu

Member of Maharashtra Legislative Assembly
- In office 7 October 1999 – 14 October 2009
- Preceded by: Lokhandwala Suhail Haji
- Succeeded by: M. Chavan,Byculla
- Constituency: Nagpada
- In office July 1980 – 13 March 1995
- Preceded by: Jamkhanawala Mo Hammad Ishaq Abedin
- Succeeded by: Lokhandwala Suhail Haji
- Constituency: Nagpada

Personal details
- Born: 6 March 1943 Faizabad, United Provinces, British India
- Died: 27 September 2015 (aged 72) Mumbai, Maharashtra, India
- Party: Indian National Congress
- Spouse: Smt. Syed Hasan Tara

Syed Ahmed Alinki (6 March 1943 – 27 September 2015) was an Indian politician, author and a member of the Congress Party. He was sworn in as the Governor of Manipur on 16 May 2015, but only served four months before dying in office on 27 September. During his short tenure as governor, the Manipur Tenants, Visitors and Migrant Workers Bill, 2015 was passed by the Manipur Assembly on 15 March.

Syed was married and had two children, a son and daughter. He died of cancer on 27 September 2015 at Lilavati Hospital Bandra, Mumbai, India at the age of 72 whilst in office as a state governor.

== Early life ==
Ahmed held two master's degrees in both Hindi and English as well as a doctorate in Urdu. He has written an autobiography, Pagdandi se Shahar Tak and his other works include Maktal se Manzil, Kafas se Chaman and Jange-Azaadi Me Urdu Shayari.

== Political career ==
Ahmed joined the Indian National Congress in 1977. He was elected to the Vidhan Sabha five times as a representative of the Nagpada constituency in Mumbai. He also served as a state minister in Maharashtra.

On 26 August 2011, Indian President Pratibha Patil appointed Ahmed as the eighth Governor of the northern state of Jharkhand. He was chosen to succeed M. O. H. Farook, who was appointed Governor of Kerala on the same day by President Patil. Syed Ahmed was sworn in as the Governor of Jharkhand on 4 September 2011. Ahmed was administered the oath of office by acting Jharkhand Chief Justice Prakash Chandra Tatiya at the state Raj Bhavan. Dr. Syed Ahmed was shifted to Manipur in May 2015.

On 16 May 2015, Dr. Syed Ahmed was sworn in as the Governor of Manipur at the Raj Bhavan in Imphal. The Chief Justice of Manipur High Court, Laxmi Kanta Mohapatra administered the oath of office and secretary to Dr. Syed Ahmed.

Government offices
Preceded by M. O. H. Farook	Governor of Jharkhand; 2011–2015	Succeeded by Draupadi Murmu
Preceded by Krishan Kant Paul	Governor of Manipur; May – September 2015	Succeeded by V. Shanmuganathan
