= Rama Jois =

Indian judge and politician (1931–2021)

Hon'ble Justice Mandagadde Rama Jois
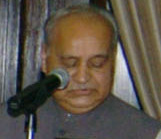

Member of Parliament, Rajya Sabha
- In office 26 June 2008 – 25 June 2014
- Chairman: Hamid Ansari
- Constituency: Karnataka

19th Governor of Bihar
- In office 12 June 2003 – 31 October 2004
- Appointed by: A. P. J. Abdul Kalam
- Chief Minister: Rabri Devi
- Preceded by: V. C. Pande
- Succeeded by: Buta Singh; Ved Marwah (Additional Charge)

2nd Governor of Jharkhand
- In office 15 July 2002 – 11 June 2003
- Appointed by: K. R. Narayanan
- Chief Minister: Babulal Marandi; Arjun Munda
- Preceded by: Prabhat Kumar; V. C. Pande (Additional Charge)
- Succeeded by: Ved Marwah

20th Chief Justice of Punjab & Haryana High Court
- In office 3 May 1992 – 31 August 1992
- Nominated by: M. H. Kania
- Appointed by: R. Venkataraman
- Preceded by: Bipin Chandra Verma
- Succeeded by: Sudarshan Dayal Aggarwal; S. S. Sodhi (acting)

Judge of Karnataka High Court
- In office 28 November 1977 – 2 May 1992
- Nominated by: M. H. Beg
- Appointed by: Neelam Sanjiva Reddy
- Acting Chief Justice
- In office 7 October 1991 – 31 October 1991
- Appointed by: R. Venkataraman
- Preceded by: S. Mohan
- Succeeded by: S. P. Bharucha
- In office 17 September 1989 – 25 October 1989
- Appointed by: R. Venkataraman
- Preceded by: Prem Chand Jain
- Succeeded by: S. Mohan

Personal details
- Born: 27 July 1931 Araga, Kingdom of Mysore, British India
- Died: 16 February 2021 (aged 89) Bengaluru, Karnataka, India
- Party: Bharatiya Janata Party
- Spouse: Vimala
- Children: One son One daughter
- Education: Government Law College, Bengaluru; University of Mysore
- Profession: Advocate, Writer and Politician

Mandagadde Rama Jois (27 July 1931 – 16 February 2021) was an Indian politician and judge who served as a member of Rajya Sabha, as governor of Jharkhand and Bihar states, and as Chief Justice of the Punjab and Haryana High Court. He was also a senior advocate in the Supreme Court of India.

== Early life and education ==
Rama Jois was born to Babburkamme Brahmin parents, Narasimha Jois and Lakshmidevamma on 27 July 1931 at Araga village, Shivamogga, Karnataka, India. He studied in Shivamogga and Bengaluru and acquired B.A.& B.L. degrees and was given an honorary Doctor of Laws degree by Kuvempu University.

== Career ==
Rama Jois enrolled as an advocate in 1959 and started practising in the Karnataka High Court.

Jois was appointed as judge of the Karnataka High Court on 28 November 1977 along with N. Venkatachala, who later became judge of the Supreme Court of India. Jois served there for approximately fourteen and a half years and also performed duties as Acting Chief Justice on various occasions including in 1989 and 1991.

On 3 May 1992, he assumed office as Chief Justice of the Punjab and Haryana High Court. His tenure, however, was brief and ended with his resignation on 31 August 1992. He relinquished the post of Judge, protesting injustice, as he was overlooked to be posted as a Supreme Court Judge.

Post retirement he also served as Governor of Bihar and Jharkhand between 2002 and 2004. He was also elected as Member of Parliament, Rajya Sabha for a six year term in 2008.

== Author ==
He is a noted writer and historian having written several books on Service Law, Habeas Corpus Law, Constitutional Law, etc. His most known two-volume book "Legal and Constitutional History of India", considered as a previous volume, is a textbook for Law Degree course. His other well known book is "Seeds of Modern Public Law in Ancient Indian Jurisprudence". His other works include "Historic Legal Battle", " Dharma - The Global Ethic" etc. His views on Dharma and Manu Smriti are of immense value, as they have been simplified for the understanding of the common man.

=== Other Books published ===
- Services under the State (1974)
- Legal and Constitutional History of India (1982)
- Historical Battle (1977)
- Dharma : The Global Ethic (English, Hindi and Kannada) (1996)
- Ancient Indian Law : Eternal values in Manu Smrithi (English, Kannada, Hindi) (2003)
- Trivarga Siddantha (English and Kannada) (2005)
- The Bharathiya way to lead Purposeful life (English and Kannada) 2007
- National Reconciliation for Harmonious Living (2008)
- Code of Conduct for Rulers (English and Kannada) 2007
- Raja Dharma with lessons on Raja neethi
- Need for Amending the Constitution

== Positions held ==
- Governor of Jharkhand State
- Governor of Bihar State
- Rajya Sabha Member in Karnataka
- Chief Justice, Punjab and Haryana High Court

== Political affiliation ==
During the Emergency of 1975–1977, imposed by Indira Gandhi, he filed PIL in the Karnataka High Court challenging the detention of A. B. Vajpayee and L. K. Advani, but later he was also detained and held in Bengaluru Central Prison alongside several political leaders, including Madhu Dandavate and Atal Bihari Vajpayee. He is recognised with Bharatiya Janata Party in Karnataka.

== Family life ==
He was married to Smt. Vimala, has two children and three grandchildren. He resided in Bengaluru, India. His son M. R. Shailendra and daughter M. R. Tara are both advocates in the city of Bengaluru, India.

== Death ==
Rama Jois died from a heart attack on 16 February 2021 at 7:30 AM in his residence at Rajajinagar, Bengaluru, India.

His last rites were held at Hindu burial-ground in Chamarajpet, Bengaluru, India.
