= V. Shanmuganathan =

Indian politician

V Shanmuganathan
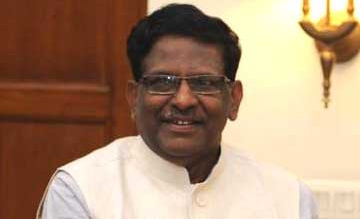

15th Governor of Meghalaya
- In office 20 May 2015 – 27 January 2017
- Chief Minister: Mukul Sangma
- Preceded by: Keshari Nath Tripathi
- Succeeded by: Banwarilal Purohit

Governor of Arunachal Pradesh (Additional Charge)
- In office 14 September 2016 – 27 January 2017
- Chief Minister: Pema Khandu
- Preceded by: Jyoti Prasad Rajkhowa
- Succeeded by: Padmanabha Acharya

17th Governor of Manipur (Additional Charge)
- In office 30 September 2015 – 21 August 2016
- Chief Minister: Okram Ibobi Singh
- Preceded by: Syed Ahmed
- Succeeded by: Najma Heptulla

Personal details
- Born: 21 November 1949 (age 76) Thanjavur, Madras State, India
- Education: University of Madras

V Shanmuganathan (born 21 November 1949) is an Indian politician who has held gubernatorial positions in Meghalaya and Arunachal Pradesh.

He was the Governor of the Indian state of Meghalaya, in office from 2015 to 26 January 2017. A veteran from Tamil Nadu, he also held an additional charge as Governor of Arunachal Pradesh from September 2016 till his resignation on 26 January 2017.

== Early life and career ==
A post-graduate and an MPhil in Political Science, V Shanmuganathan received the Madras University's prestigious Gold Medal from its well-known Vice Chancellor T P Meenakshi Sundarnar in 1970. Born on 21 November 1949, he hails from Thanjavur in Tamil Nadu.

Shanmuganathan joined the Hindu right-wing organisation Rashtriya Swayamsevak Sangh (RSS) in 1962. Subsequently, he joined Bharatiya Janata Party and served in many party positions.

== Governorships ==
Shanmuganathan succeeded Keshari Nath Tripathi as Governor of Meghalaya on 12 May 2015. On 30 September 2015 he was additionally sworn in as the 17th Governor of Manipur after the death in office of Syed Ahmed.

== Controversy ==
Shanmuganathan was accused of severe misconduct during this tenure as Meghalaya governor. Staff of the Raj Bhavan launched a campaign against him for the alleged sexual misconduct, following which he resigned.

Government offices
Preceded by Keshari Nath Tripathi	Governor of Meghalaya; 20 May 2015 – 27 January 2017	Succeeded by Banwarilal Purohit
Preceded by Syed Ahmed	Governor of Manipur; 30 September 2015 – 21 August 2016	Succeeded by Najma Heptulla
Preceded by Jyoti Prasad Rajkhowa	Governor of Arunachal Pradesh; 14 September 2016 – 27 January 2017	Succeeded by Padmanabha Acharya
