= Shushil Kumar Jha =

Indian judge (born 1931)

Sushil Kumar Jha
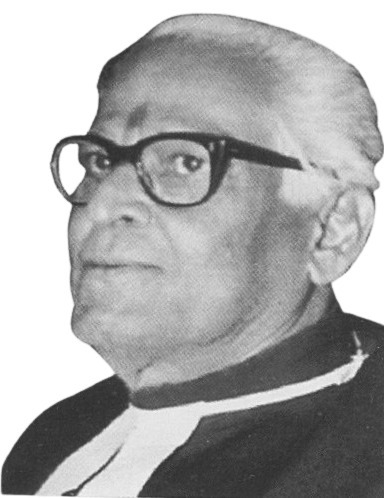

13th Chief Justice of Madhya Pradesh High Court
- In office 27 October 1989 – 15 December 1993
- Preceded by: Gangadhar Ganesh Sohani
- Succeeded by: Ullal Lakshminarayana Bhat

22nd Chief Justice of Patna High Court
- In office 19 October 1989 – 23 October 1989
- Preceded by: Dipak Kumar Sen
- Succeeded by: Gangadhar Ganesh Sohani

Judge of Patna High Court
- In office 12 April 1973 – 18 October 1989

Personal details
- Born: 15 December 1931

Sushil Kumar Jha (born 15 December 1931) was an Indian judge and a Chief Justice of Patna High Court.

== Life and career ==
Sushil Kumar Jha served as the 22nd Chief Justice of Patna High Court. His 5 day tenure as the Chief Justice of Patna High Court is the second shortest tenure in the history of the high court only behind 1 day tenure of Justice Bhagwati Prasad Jha. He was later transferred as the 13th Chief Justice of Madhya Pradesh High Court.
