= Gangadhar Ganesh Sohani =

23rd Chief Justice of Patna High Court

Hon'ble Chief Justice Gangadhar Ganesh Sohani
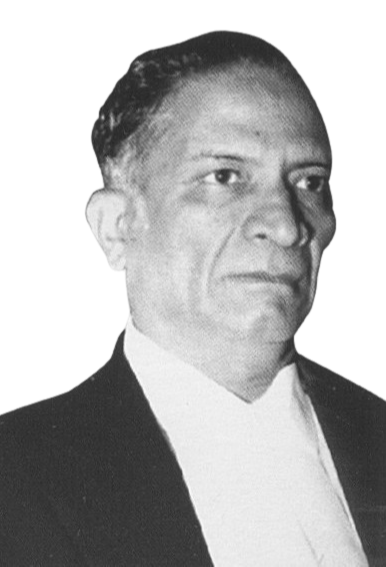

23rd Chief Justice of Patna High Court
- In office 24 October 1989 – 17 December 1989
- Nominated by: E. S. Venkataramiah
- Appointed by: R. Venkataraman
- Preceded by: Shushil Kumar Jha
- Succeeded by: Bimal Chandra Basak; N. P. Singh (acting)

12th Chief Justice of Madhya Pradesh High Court
- In office 20 October 1989 – 23 October 1989
- Nominated by: E. S. Venkataramiah
- Appointed by: R. Venkataraman
- Preceded by: Narayan Dutta Ojha
- Succeeded by: Shushil Kumar Jha

Judge of Madhya Pradesh High Court
- In office 2 June 1973 – 19 October 1989; Acting CJ : 19 January 1988 – 19 October 1989
- Nominated by: Ajit Nath Ray
- Appointed by: V. V. Giri
- Acting Chief Justice
- In office 31 August 1986 – 7 January 1987
- Appointed by: Zail Singh
- Preceded by: J. S. Verma
- Succeeded by: N. D. Ojha

Personal details
- Born: 18 December 1928
- Died: October 2007 (aged 78)
- Education: Allahabad University, Government Law College, Bombay

Gangadhar Ganesh Sohani (18 December 1928 – October 2007) also known as G. G. Sohani was an Indian jurist who served as a judge of the Madhya Pradesh High Court and later as Chief Justice of the Madhya Pradesh and Patna High Courts. He also served as the acting Governor of Bihar.

== Education ==
Sohani was born on 18 December 1928, he received his education at Victoria College, Gwalior, the University of Allahabad, Government Law College, Bombay, and the School of Economics, Bombay. After enrolling as an advocate, he established his practice at Indore, primarily handling civil, criminal and labour matters. He also served as Deputy Government Advocate from August 1961 to February 1970, gaining experience in government litigation and legal administration.

== Career ==
Sohani was appointed a judge of the Madhya Pradesh High Court on 2 June 1973. Following the transfer of Chief Justice Jagdish Sharan Verma to the Rajasthan High Court on 1 September 1986, Sohani assumed the responsibilities of Acting Chief Justice of the Madhya Pradesh High Court. He held this position from 31 August 1986 to 7 January 1987, when Narayan Dutta Ojha was appointed as permanent Chief Justice. He was appointed Acting Chief Justice again on 19 January 1988, serving in that capacity until 19 October 1989.

On 20 October 1989, He was appointed Chief Justice of the Madhya Pradesh High Court. His tenure, however, lasted only four days, as he was transferred to the Patna High Court on 24 October 1989 and assumed office as its Chief Justice. Government notification announcing his appointment as Chief Justice of Madhya Pradesh High Court also announced his transfer to Patna High Court simultaneously thus resulting in very short tenure as Madhya Pradesh Chief Justice. He served in that position until 18 December 1990, when he retired upon attaining the age of superannuation.

Sohani also served as Acting Governor of Bihar from 2 February to 16 February 1990, while he was Chief Justice of the Patna High Court. He assumed the additional constitutional responsibility following the end of Jagannath Pahadia’s tenure and held the office until Mohammad Yunus Saleem took over as Governor.

Sohani died in October 2007.
