= List of governors of Jharkhand =

Jharkhand heads of state

Governor of Jharkhand
- Emblem of Jharkhand

- Flag of India

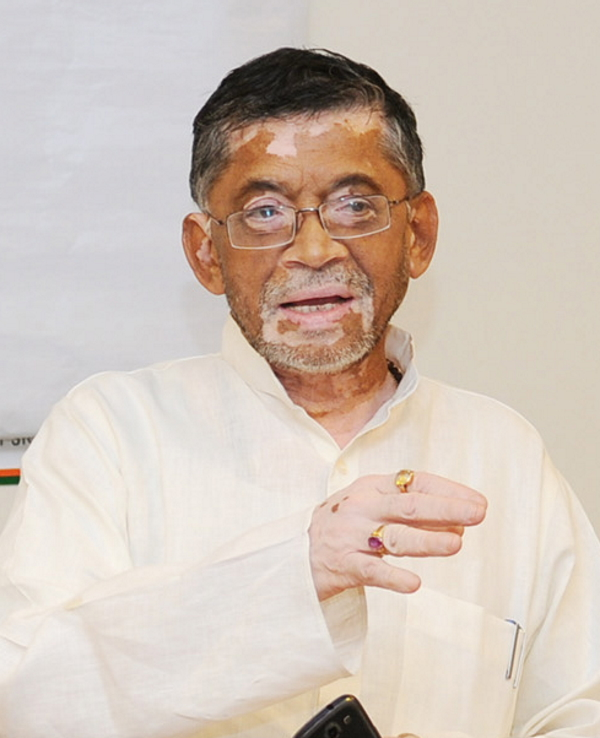
- Incumbent; Santosh Gangwar since 31 July 2024
- Style: His/Her Excellency
- Residence: Lok Bhavan, Ranchi (primary); Lok Bhavan, Dumka (occasionally)
- Appointer: President of India
- Term length: At the pleasure of the president
- Precursor: Governor of Bihar
- Inaugural holder: Prabhat Kumar
- Formation: 15 November 2000; 26 years ago
- Website: lokbhavanjharkhand.nic.in

The governor of Jharkhand is the nominal head of the Indian state of Jharkhand. The governor is appointed by the president of India. Though all official affairs of the state are administered and carried out in the name of the governor, the real executive power rests with the chief minister who is a member of the legislative assembly and is the leader of the majority party in the house. Lok Bhavan, Ranchi is the official residence of the Governor of Jharkhand, while Lok Bhavan, Dumka is used for occasional visits.

The position of the governor of Jharkhand came into existence following the creation of the state in November 2000 as a result of the bifurcation of Bihar. The first governor to be appointed was Prabhat Kumar who served in office between 2000 and 2002. The current governor is Santosh Gangwar.

== Powers and functions ==
The governor enjoys many different types of powers:

- Executive powers related to administration, appointments and removals,
- Legislative powers related to lawmaking and the state legislature, that is Vidhan Sabha or Vidhan Parishad, and
- Discretionary powers to be carried out according to the discretion of the governor.

Apart from enjoying various constitutional powers, the governor of Jharkhand is the ex-officio Chancellor of the state universities of Jharkhand. The universities include Binod Bihari Mahto Koyalanchal University, Birsa Agricultural University, Dr. Shyama Prasad Mukherjee University, Jharkhand Raksha Shakti University, Jharkhand University of Technology, Kolhan University, Nilamber-Pitamber University, Ranchi University, Sido Kanhu Murmu University, and Vinoba Bhave University.

== List ==
Following is the list of governors of Jharkhand since its inception on 15 November 2000. As of date, ten governors have been appointed to office. The first governor was Prabhat Kumar who served from 2000 till 2002. The current governor is Santosh Gangwar who has been in office since 31 July 2024. The first female and the longest serving governor of the state till date is Droupadi Murmu who served as the governor between 2015 and 2021.

Legend

- ^{†} Died in office
- ^{§} Transferred
- ^{‡} Resigned/removed

Color key

- indicates acting/additional charge

#	Portrait	Name (born – died)	Home state	Tenure in office			Appointer (President)
#	Portrait	Name (born – died)	Home state	From	To	Time in office	Appointer (President)
1		Prabhat Kumar; IAS (Retd) (born 1940)	Uttar Pradesh	15 November 2000	3 February 2002^{[‡]}	1 year, 80 days	K. R. Narayanan
2		Vinod Chandra Pande; IAS (Retd) (1938–2005) (Additional charge)	Uttar Pradesh	4 February 2002	14 July 2002	160 days	K. R. Narayanan
3		Justice (Retd); Mandagadde Rama Jois (1931–2021)	Karnataka	15 July 2002	11 June 2003^{[§]} (Note: Transferred as the Governor of Bihar)	331 days	K. R. Narayanan
4		Ved Marwah; IPS (Retd) (1934–2020)	National Capital Territory of Delhi	12 June 2003	9 December 2004	1 year, 180 days	A. P. J. Abdul Kalam
5		Syed Sibtey Razi (1939–2022)	Uttar Pradesh	10 December 2004	25 July 2009^{[§]} (Note: Transferred as the Governor of Assam)	4 years, 227 days	A. P. J. Abdul Kalam
6		Kateekal Sankaranarayanan (1932–2022)	Kerala	26 July 2009	21 January 2010^{[§]} (Note: Transferred as the Governor of Maharashtra)	179 days	Pratibha Patil
7		M. O. H. Farook (1937–2012)	Puducherry	22 January 2010	4 September 2011^{[§]} (Note: Transferred as the Governor of Kerala)	1 year, 225 days	Pratibha Patil
8		Syed Ahmed (1943–2015)	Maharashtra	4 September 2011	17 May 2015^{[§]} (Note: Transferred as the Governor of Manipur)	3 years, 255 days	Pratibha Patil
9		Droupadi Murmu (born 1958)	Odisha	18 May 2015	13 July 2021	6 years, 56 days	Pranab Mukherjee
10		Ramesh Bais (born 1947)	Chhattisgarh	14 July 2021	17 February 2023^{[§]}	1 year, 218 days	Ram Nath Kovind
11		C. P. Radhakrishnan (born 1957)	Tamil Nadu	18 February 2023	30 July 2024^{[§]}	1 year, 163 days	Droupadi Murmu
12		Santosh Kumar Gangwar (born 1948)	Uttar Pradesh	31 July 2024	Incumbent	2 years, 108 days	Droupadi Murmu

== Oath ==
“I, A. B., do swear in the name of God/solemly affirm that I will faithfully execute the office of Governor (or discharge the functions of the Governor) of .............(name of the State) and will to the best of my ability preserve, protect and defend the Constitution and the law and that I will devote myself to the service and well-being of the people of ..………(name of the State).”Main, [Name], Ishwar ki shapath leta hoon (ya nishtha se pratigya karta hoon) ki main sachhe mann se Governor (Rajyapal) ke roop mein [State Name] ke pad ka karyabhar sambhalunga (ya zimmedari uthaunga). Main apni poori kabiliyat se Samvidhan (Constitution) aur kanoon (Law) ki raksha, suraksha aur bachaav karunga, aur main apne aap ko [State Name] ki janta ki seva aur kalyan (well-being) mein samarpit karunga."

== See also ==
- Governor (India)
- Government of India
- Government of Jharkhand
- Lok Bhavan, Ranchi
- Lok Bhavan, Dumka
- Ranchi University
- List of institutions of higher education in Jharkhand
