= Lok Bhavan, Imphal =

Residence of the Governor of Manipur

- Interactive map of the Lok Bhavan, Imphal area

General information
- Coordinates: 24.803253°N 93.936769°E
- Current tenants: Ajay Kumar Bhalla
- Owner: Government of Manipur

References
- Website

Lok Bhavan formerly Raj Bhavan (translation: Government House) is the official residence of the governor of Manipur Ajay Kumar Bhalla. The present structure was completed in 1898 after the old thatched roofed structure was destroyed in the Anglo-Manipur War of 1891. It is located in the capital city of Imphal, Manipur and the area of the campus is 16 acres (65,000 m^{2}). The present governor of Manipur is Ajay Kumar Bhalla.

== See also ==
- Government Houses of the British Indian Empire
- List of governors of Manipur
