= Shanmughasundaram Mohan =

Indian judge (1930–2019)

Hon'ble Justice Shanmughasundaram Mohan

Judge of Supreme Court of India
- In office 7 October 1991 – 10 February 1995
- Nominated by: Ranganath Misra
- Appointed by: R. Venkataraman

12th Chief Justice of Karnataka High Court
- In office 26 October 1989 – 6 October 1991
- Nominated by: E. S. Venkataramiah
- Appointed by: R. Venkataraman
- Preceded by: Prem Chand Jain; Rama Jois (acting)
- Succeeded by: S. P. Bharucha; Rama Jois (acting)

23rd Chief Justice of Madras High Court
- In office 19 October 1989 – 26 October 1989
- Nominated by: E. S. Venkataramiah
- Appointed by: R. Venkataraman
- Preceded by: M. N. Chandurkar; Ratnavel Pandian (acting)
- Succeeded by: A. S. Anand

Judge of the Madras High Court
- In office 27 February 1974 – 18 October 1989; Acting CJ : 13 December 1988 – 18 October 1989
- Nominated by: Ajit Nath Ray
- Appointed by: V. V. Giri

Personal details
- Born: 11 February 1930 Udumalpet, Coimbatore district, British India
- Died: 27 December 2019 (aged 89) Chennai, Tamil Nadu, India
- Education: Presidency College, Madras, Madras University

Shanmughasundaram Mohan (11 February 1930 – 27 December 2019) was an Indian jurist, who served as the judge of the Supreme Court of India, former Chief Justice of the Madras and Karnataka High Courts, and former Acting Governor of Karnataka. He authored 11 books in English and seven books in Tamil.

== Education ==
Shanmughasundaram Mohan was born in Udumalpet of Coimbatore district on 11 February 1930. After completing graduation from Presidency College Madras, he did his bachelor's degree in law from University of Madras and Masters in Constitution and International Law.From 1956 to 1966, Mohan served as a part-time lecturer in Madras Law College.

== Career ==
He enrolled as advocate in the High Court of Madras in August 1954, he became government pleader in 1969. He was appointed Advocate General of Madras in 1971. On 27 February 1974, he was appointed additional judge of Madras High Court and became permanent judge on 1 August 1975. He served in the Madras High Court for more than a decade and a half. On 13 December 1988, he became its Acting Chief Justice following elevation of Acting Chief Justice Ratnavel Pandian to Supreme Court of India. He was subsequently appointed Chief Justice of the Madras High Court on 19 October 1989. He was appointed Chief Justice of the Karnataka High Court on 26 October 1989. His tenure as permanent chief justice of Madras High Court was brief because government notification appointing him as the Madras' Chief Justice simultaneously appointed him as Chief Justice of Karnataka High Court.

In the wake of removal of Pendekanti Venkatasubbaiah in 1990, he served as Acting Governor of Karnataka state from 5 February 1990 to 8 May 1990.

He became judge of Supreme Court on 7 October 1991 and retired from the service on 10 February 1995.

After retirement Justice Mohan was appointed chairman of the National Cyber Safety and Security Standards and Chairman of Pay Revision Committee of Public Sector Undertakings, Government of India. In 2004, he was appointed by the Madras High Court to ensure free and fair elections in the BCCI.

He died on 27 December 2019 at Chennai, Tamil Nadu.

== Literary contributions ==
Mohan has authored 11 books in English on varied subjects and seven books in Tamil including a collections of poems. He served as the president of the World Academy of Arts and Culture and was the president of the World Congress of Poets for six years during 2004–2010. Justice Triumphs, Wild Blooms, Random Reflections, His Many Splendored Gem and Law and Social Justice are some of the books he wrote in English language.

== Awards and honours ==
- Sri Muthuswamy Iyer Scholarship.
- Lakshminarasa Reddy Gold Medal
- Madras University's gold medal for securing a first class in the law course in 1952
- Honorary doctorate degrees from four universities, including three foreign universities
