= Dipak Kumar Sen =

Indian judge (born 1927)

21st Chief Justice of Patna High Court
- In office 1 May 1988 – 1 May 1989
- Preceded by: Shushil Kumar Jha
- Succeeded by: Bhagwati Prasad Jha

Governor of Bihar
- In office 24 January 1989 – 28 January 1989
- Preceded by: Govind Narayan Singh
- Succeeded by: R.D. Pradhan

Personal details
- Born: 1 May 1927

Dipak Kumar Sen (born 1 May 1927) was an Indian judge and a Chief Justice of Patna High Court. He was also the acting Governor of Bihar.

Sen was born on 1 May 1927. He attended St. Gregory's School in Dacca, Khulna Zilla School, and Presidency College, Calcutta. On 17 November 1950, he was called to the Bar by Gray's Inn, London.
