= Narayan Dutta Ojha =

Former Judge of Supreme Court of India (1988-1991)

Hon'ble Justice Narayan Dutta Ojha
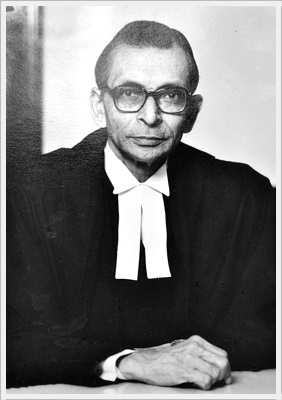

Judge of Supreme Court of India
- In office 18 January 1988 – 18 January 1991
- Nominated by: R. S. Pathak
- Appointed by: R. Venkataraman

11th Chief Justice of Madhya Pradesh High Court
- In office 8 January 1987 – 17 January 1988
- Nominated by: P. N. Bhagwati
- Appointed by: Zail Singh
- Preceded by: J. S. Verma; G. G. Sohani (acting)
- Succeeded by: G. G. Sohani

Judge of Allahabad High Court
- In office 3 September 1971 – 7 January 1987
- Nominated by: S. M. Sikri
- Appointed by: V. V. Giri
- Acting Chief Justice
- In office 18 August 1986 – 30 September 1986
- Appointed by: Zail Singh
- Preceded by: Hridai Narain Seth
- Succeeded by: K. Jagannatha Shetty

Personal details
- Born: 19 January 1926 Pratapgarh, Uttar Pradesh
- Died: 4 May 2009 (aged 83)
- Spouse: Savitri Devi (m. 1948)
- Education: B.A. and LL.B from Allahabad University

Narayan Dutta Ojha (19 January 1926 – 4 May 2009) also known as N. D. Ojha was a distinguished Indian jurist who served as a judge of the Supreme Court of India and Chief Justice of the Madhya Pradesh High Court. He also served as judge and acting chief justice of Allahabad High Court.

== Early life and education ==
Ojha was born on 19 January 1926 in Pratapgarh district of Uttar Pradesh. He completed his High School education at Daraganj High School, Allahabad, in 1939 and passed the Intermediate Examination from K. P. Intermediate College, Allahabad, in 1941. He obtained his Bachelor of Arts degree in 1943 and Bachelor of Laws degree in 1945 from the University of Allahabad. He married Savitri Devi on 15 June 1948. After completing his legal education, Ojha practised for several years as a pleader in the district courts of Allahabad. He enrolled as an advocate of the Allahabad High Court on 20 December 1951 and practised primarily in civil and constitutional matters.

== Career ==
Ojha was appointed an Additional Judge of the Allahabad High Court on 3 September 1971 and became permanent on 12 December 1972 and served on the court for more than fifteen years. He served as Acting Chief Justice of the Allahabad High Court from 18 August 1986 to 30 September 1986. On 8 January 1987, he was appointed Chief Justice of the Madhya Pradesh High Court. During his tenure, he also discharged the functions of Governor of Madhya Pradesh from 1 December 1987 to 29 December 1987.

On 18 January 1988, He was elevated to the Supreme Court of India. He served on the country's highest judicial body until his retirement on 18 January 1991. Ojha participated in several significant Supreme Court cases that shaped Indian jurisprudence. Among them was Union Carbide Corporation v. Union of India (1992 AIR 248), arising from the Bhopal Gas Tragedy, one of the most devastating industrial disasters in India's history.

== Death ==
He left for heavenly abode on 4 May 2009.

== See also ==
- List of governors of Madhya Pradesh
- List of former judges of the Supreme Court of India
- Tribeni Sahai Misra
