= Padmanabha Acharya =

Indian politician (1931–2023)

Padmanabha Balakrishna Acharya
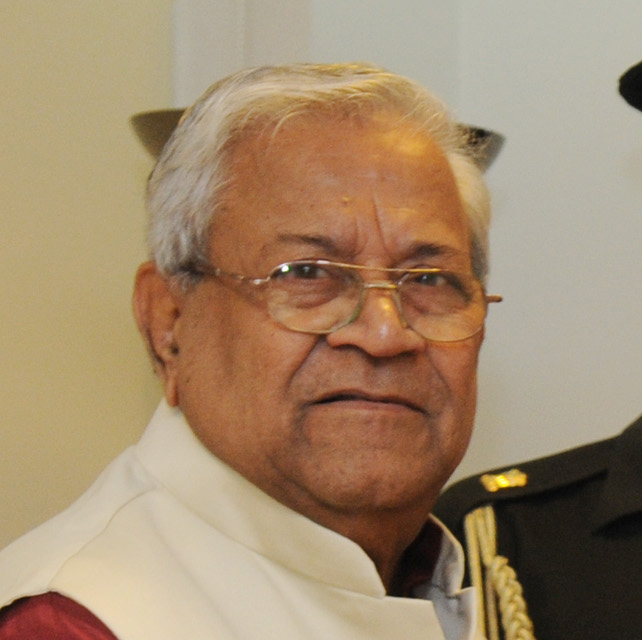
- Acharya in 2014

18th Governor of Nagaland
- In office 19 July 2014 – 31 July 2019
- Chief Minister: T. R. Zeliang; Shurhozelie Liezietsu; Neiphiu Rio
- Preceded by: Krishan Kant Paul (Additional Charge)
- Succeeded by: R. N. Ravi

Governor of Manipur (Additional charge)
- In office 27 June 2019 – 23 July 2019
- Chief Minister: N. Biren Singh
- Preceded by: Najma Heptulla
- Succeeded by: Najma Heptulla

Governor of Arunachal Pradesh (Additional Charge)
- In office 28 January 2017 – 3 October 2017
- Chief Minister: Pema Khandu
- Preceded by: V. Shanmuganathan
- Succeeded by: B. D. Mishra

15th Governor of Tripura
- In office 21 July 2014 – 19 May 2015
- Chief Minister: Manik Sarkar
- Preceded by: Vakkom Purushothaman
- Succeeded by: Tathagata Roy

26th Governor of Assam
- In office 12 December 2014 – 17 August 2016
- Chief Minister: Sarbananda Sonowal
- Preceded by: Janaki Ballabh Patnaik
- Succeeded by: Banwarilal Purohit

Personal details
- Born: 8 October 1931 Udupi, Mysore, India
- Died: 10 November 2023 (aged 92) Mumbai, Maharashtra, India
- Party: Bharatiya Janata Party
- Spouse: Smt. Kavita Acharya
- Profession: Politician

Padmanabha Balakrishna Acharya (8 October 1931 – 10 November 2023) was an Indian politician who was the Governor of Manipur, from June 2019 to July 2019 and Governor of Nagaland, from July 2014 to July 2019, also Governor of Arunachal Pradesh, from January 2017 to October 2017 and Governor of Tripura, from July 2014 to May 2015.

== Early life and education ==
Padmanabha Balakrishna Acharya was the son of Balakrishna and Radha Acharya. He was born in Udupi district in Karnataka, India. He completed his matriculation from Christian High School, Udupi. He studied at the Mahatma Gandhi Memorial College (MGM College), Udupi in 1949. After graduation, he worked in Mumbai and was associated with Akhil Bharatiya Vidyarthi Parishad (ABVP) and was a member of Mumbai University's senate. He also completed an LL.B degree from Mumbai University. He was credited with planning the University of Delhi's Gyanodaya Express college on wheels to North East India.

== Career ==
Acharya held various positions in the Bharatiya Janata Party (BJP) before becoming governor. In 1980, Shree P.B. Acharya joined the Bharatiya Janata Party. He was elected the BJP President of North West Bombay District in 1987 and later in 1989 became a committee member of the Mumbai BJP. In 1991, he was elected a national executive member of BJP in charge of the North Eastern States of India, namely: Arunachal Pradesh, Manipur, Meghalaya, Mizoram and Nagaland. He was also all India national secretary of the BJP and in charge of North Eastern States from 1995-2002. In 2002, he was the national executive member with the charge of Kerala and Lakshadweep and in 2005 of Tamil Nadu. Acharya was the national in charge of SC/ST Morcha and co-convenor of the Overseas Friends of BJP and the National Prabhari of North East India Samparka Cell. Acharya was actively engaged in My Home is India a project of ABVP for the tribal children from the North East, who were invited by the families of Mumbai city for educational purposes. Several students lived at his residence for several years (1969–79). He was involved in the activities (since 1975) of the Academy for Indian Tribal Dialects at Rani Ma Gaidinliu Bhavan – a publication wing of INFC and published 10 booklets on Tribal Nationalist leaders like Rani Gaidinliu (Manipur), U.Tirot Singh and Jaban Bay (Meghalaya), Dr. Dying Ering and Narottam (Arunachal Pradesh) and also publication of tribal proverbs, folktales and poems.

=== Governorship ===
Acharya was appointed Governor of Nagaland on 14 July 2014 after President Pranab Mukherjee accepted the resignation of Tripura Governor Vakkom Purushothaman. His term as Governor ended in July 2019.

Between 12 December 2014 and 17 August 2016, Acharya held additional charge as Governor of Assam. He was also the Governor of Tripura state of India from 21 July 2014 to 19 May 2015. He was also given additional charge as the Governor of Arunachal Pradesh state of India on 26 January 2017.

He was also given additional charge as the Governor of Manipur in the absence of Najma Heptulla for a few weeks in July 2019.

== Death ==
Padmanabha Acharya died in Mumbai on 10 November 2023, at the age of 92.

== Gallery ==
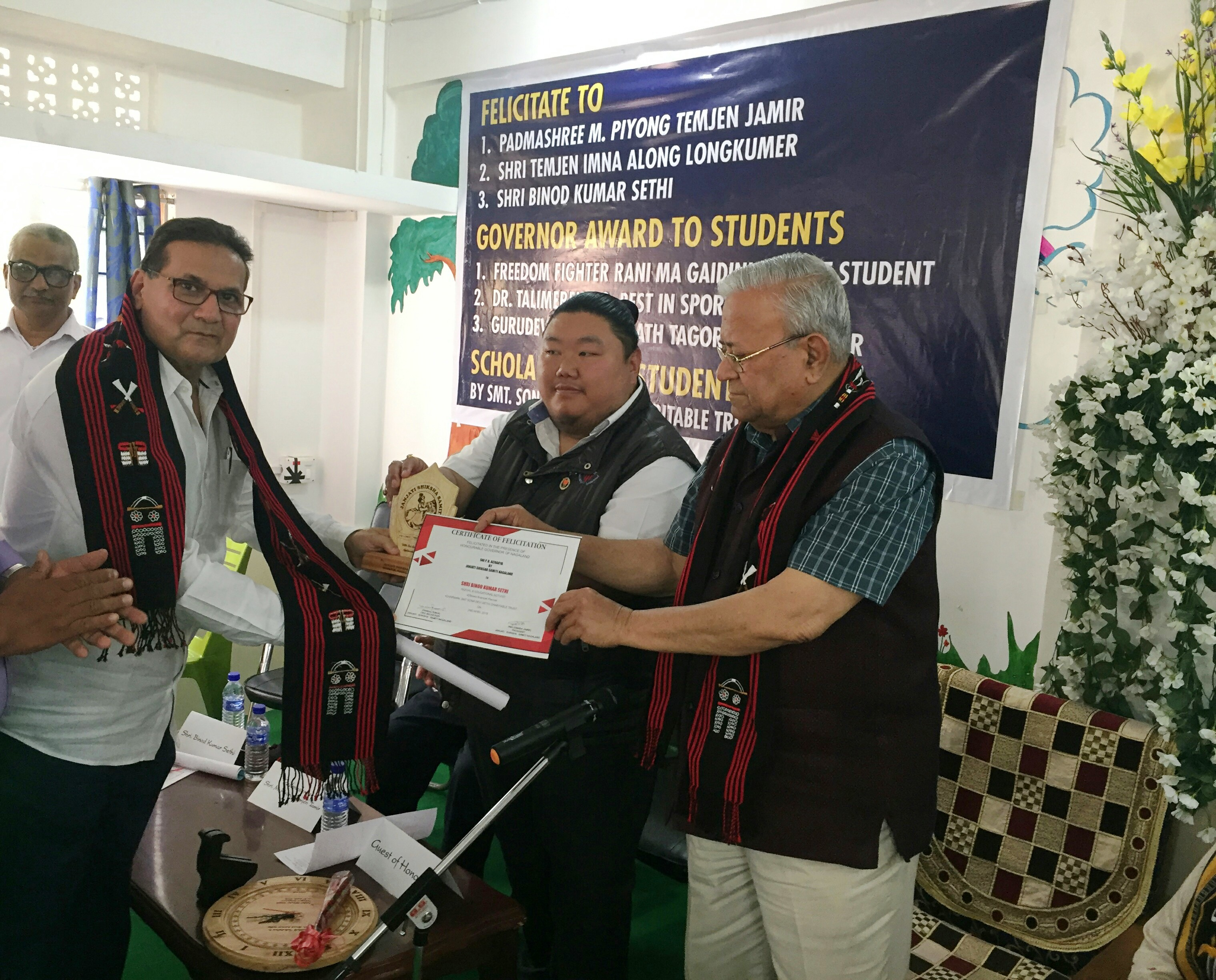
Governor of Nagaland, Padmanabha Acharya felicitating Binod Sethi

Political offices
Preceded by Krishan Kant Paul	Governor of Nagaland; 14 July 2014 – 31 July 2019	Succeeded by R. N. Ravi
Preceded by Vakkom Purushothaman	Governor of Tripura; 21 July 2014 – 19 May 2015	Succeeded by Tathagata Roy
Preceded by Janaki Ballabh Patnaik	Governor of Assam; 11 December 2014 – 17 August 2016	Succeeded by Banwarilal Purohit
Preceded by V. Shanmuganathan	Governor of Arunachal Pradesh; 27 January 2017 – 3 October 2017	Succeeded by B. D. Mishra
