= Hridayeshwar Singh Bhati =

Indian student (2002–2021)

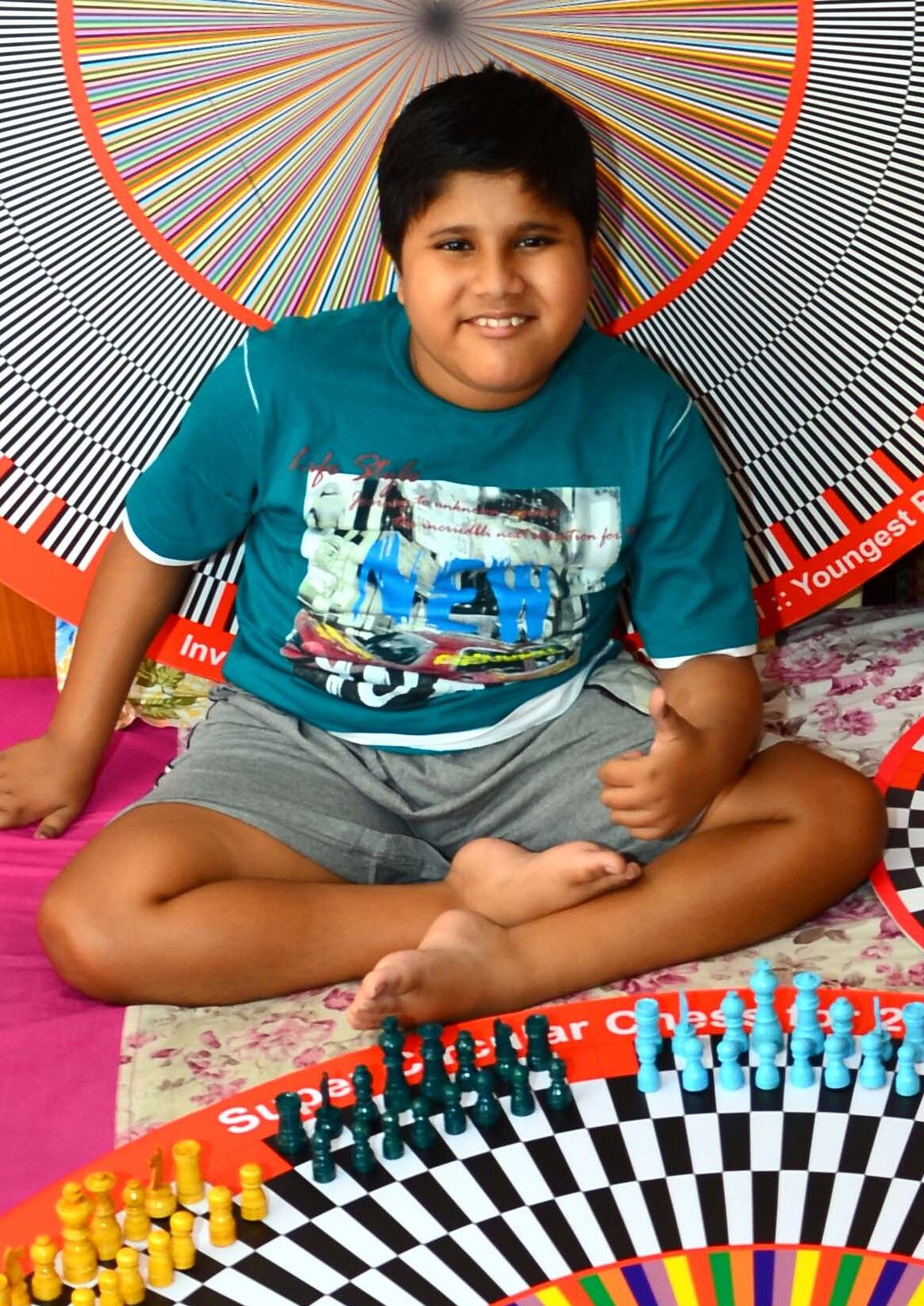
- Bhati age 11, with his chess variants
- Born: 3 September 2002; Jaipur, India
- Died: 15 June 2021 (aged 18)
- Known for: Inventing six-, twelve-, and sixty-player circular chess variants

Hridayeshwar Singh Bhati (3 September 2002 – 15 June 2021) was an Indian student who invented a six-player variant of chess at the age of 9 with assistance from his father. He earned a patent for his invention in 2012, making him the youngest patent-holder in India at that time. For his invention Bhati received the CavinKare Ability Special Recognition Award and the Sri Balaji Society's Child Innovator Award.

Besides circular chess, Bhati developed a ramp system enabling easy access to vehicles for disabled people. In 2014 he was presented a Dr. Batra's Positive Health Award by Mahendra Singh Dhoni.

Bhati had Duchenne muscular dystrophy and used a wheelchair. He credited his passion for invention to his admiration of British physicist Stephen Hawking: "I want to be like Hawking who became a famous scientist despite suffering from motor neuron disease." Bhati died of cardiac arrest on 15 June 2021.

== Six-player circular chess ==
Bhati's version of multiplayer chess is played on a circular board with 228 black and white cells (or spaces). The 12 red spaces are not used. Up to six players in teams of two or three can play. Bhati's design employs all the standard chess pieces and their moves. Individual armies are distinguished by colour.

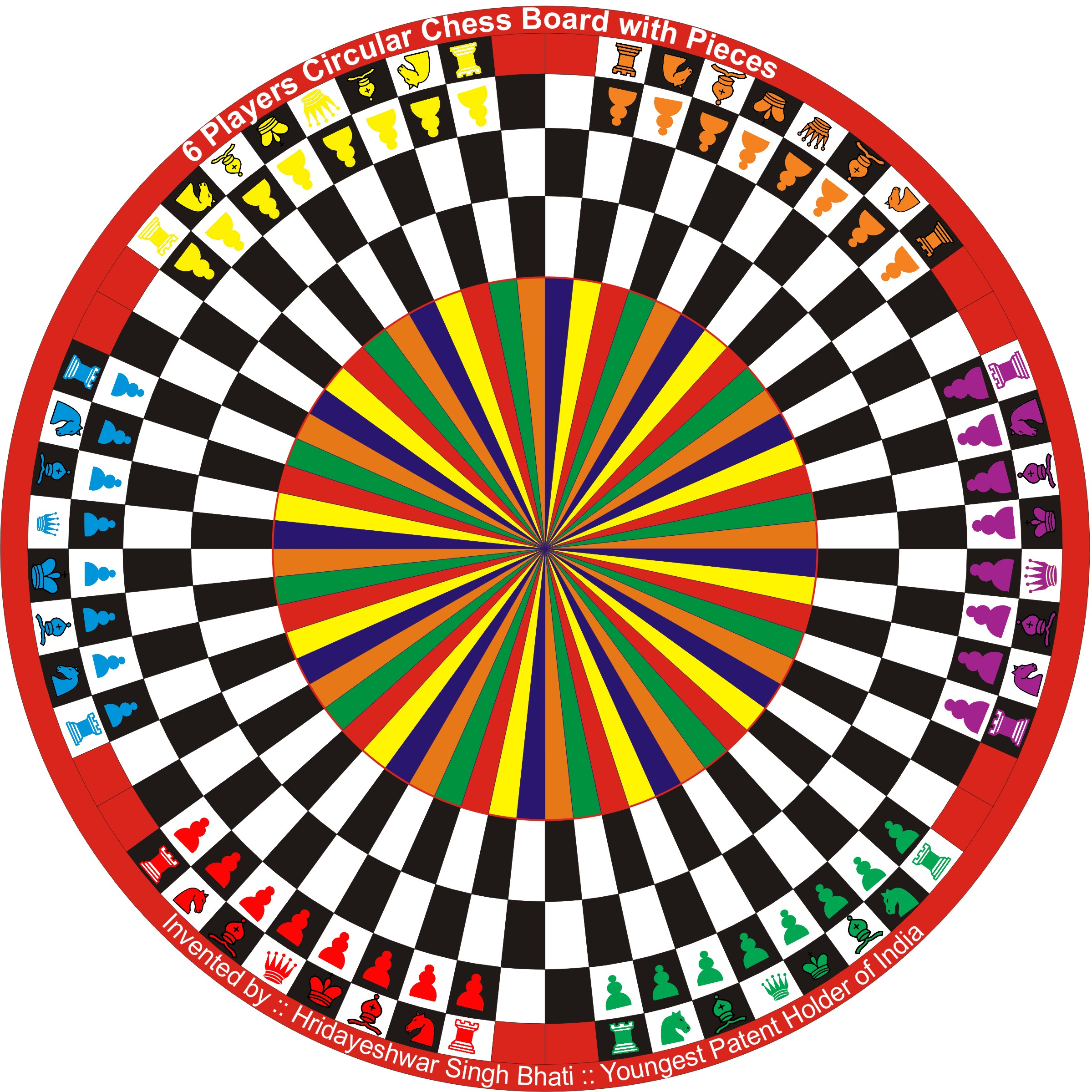
Six-player circular chess, starting setup

=== Rules ===
Each player starts the game with the same number and types of pieces as in standard chess. Non-pawn pieces start in their normal positions on the back ranks (the 8×1 extensions at the board perimeter), with queens always placed to the left of kings. Pawns are placed on the rank in front of the pieces as in standard chess.

Red spaces cannot be occupied or passed through when moving or capturing. The multicoloured central area can be passed through but not occupied. It is considered a single "null" space, so a cell bordering it is considered adjacent to the cell on the direct opposite side of the null area. (E.g., a pawn on a cell bordering the null space that moves one step straight forward, will end its move on the opposite side of the null space on the same-coloured cell.)

The king, knight, and pawn have their standard chess moves, unaffected when crossing the central null space, where a cell directly across is considered adjacent. A pawn promotes as normal when reaching any player's back rank. A rook moves horizontally along concentric rings of cells, and vertically along files, including crossing the central null space and continuing along the same file in a straight line. When moving horizontally, a rook cannot end its move on the same cell it started from. The queen moves horizontally and vertically the same as a rook. When a queen or bishop moves diagonally and then crosses the central null space to the opposite side, it must continue from a cell of the same colour it started from: it is moved one cell clockwise or anticlockwise after passing the null space, consistent with whether it began its diagonal movement in a clockwise or anticlockwise direction.

When a player is checkmated or resigns, all their remaining pieces are removed from play. In games where teams compete, the last team standing is the winner.

== See also ==
- Circular chess
