= Sunder Singh Bhandari =

Indian politician

14th Governor of Gujarat
- In office 18 March 1999 – 7 May 2003
- Chief Minister: Keshubhai Patel; Narendra Modi
- Preceded by: K.G. Balakrishnan
- Succeeded by: Kailashpati Mishra

16th Governor of Bihar
- In office 27 April 1998 – 15 March 1999
- Chief Minister: Rabri Devi
- Preceded by: Akhlaqur Rahman Kidwai
- Succeeded by: V. C. Pande

Member of Parliament, Rajya Sabha
- In office 5 July 1992 – 26 April 1998
- Constituency: Rajasthan
- In office 3 April 1976 – 2 April 1982
- Constituency: Uttar Pradesh
- In office 3 April 1966 – 2 April 1972
- Constituency: Rajasthan

Personal details
- Born: 12 April 1921 Udaipur, Udaipur State, British India
- Died: 22 June 2005 (aged 84) New Delhi, India
- Party: Bharatiya Janata Party
- Parent: Sujan Singh Bhandari (father)
- Education: M.A., LL.B.
- Alma mater: DAV College, Kanpur

Sunder Singh Bhandari (12 April 1921 – 22 June 2005) was an Indian politician, a Rashtriya Swayamsevak Sangh pracharak and politician belonging to the Bharatiya Jana Sangh and Bharatiya Janata Party (BJP).

== Early life and education ==
He was born to Dr. Sujan Singhji Bhandari and Fulkanvarbaiji in Udaipur in 1921 he had his school education at Sirohi and Udaipur and college education at Kanpur. He passed his Graduation degree in law from S.D. College, Kanpur in the year 1941 and Post Graduation in Arts with Psychology from Dayanand Anglo-Vedic College, Kanpur in the year 1942.

== Career ==
He practised law at then Mewar High Court for some time before joining Rashtriya Swayamsevak Sangh (RSS). He held numerous responsibilities in RSS. He was a founding member of Jan Sangh, a political party founded in 1951.

He served in various organisational posts in Jan Sangha and later in the BJP. He was the Vice President of BJP before he became the Governor. He was elected to Rajya Sabha from Rajasthan during 1966-1972 and from Uttar Pradesh in 1976 and also in 1992.

He was arrested at Delhi Railway station in 1976 when Indira Gandhi declared the Emergency in India.

He was appointed Governor of Bihar on 27 April 1998 and served until 15 March 1999. He served as the governor of Gujarat from 18 March 1999 to 6 May 2003. He died on 22 June 2005.

Preceded by Akhlaqur Rahman Kidwai	Governor of the Bihar; April 1998 – March 1999	Succeeded by V. C. Pande

Preceded by K.G. Balakrishnan	Governor of the Gujarat; March 1999 – May 2003	Succeeded by Kailashpati Mishra
