= Ishaq Jamkhanawala =

Indian politician (born 1930)

Dr. Ishaq Jamkhanawala

Personal details
- Born: Belgaum, Karnataka, India
- Spouse: Latifa Jamkhanawala
- Children: Shoaib Jamkhanawala, Nakhat Mulla, Farhat Sayed
- Profession: Doctor, politician, educationist

Dr. Ishaq Jamkhanawala (4 January 1930 – 31 August 2008) was an educationist, social worker and politician based in Mumbai. A former MLA (Nagpada:1978), MLC and a two-time minister (1978, 1988) from Maharashtra. He played a major role in expanding the Mumbai-based educational institution Anjuman-I-Islam as its president from 1983 to 2006.

== Early life ==
Born on 4 January 1930 into a middle-class family of traders in Belgaum, Karnataka, Dr. Jamkhanawala was the first person to complete secondary education in his family. He was still in high school when his father expired and pursued higher education by seeking scholarships.

with Morarji Desai

== Doctorhood and social work ==
He moved to Mumbai in the early 1950s in pursuit of higher education at Grant Medical College, Mumbai. In 1958, he opened his dispensary in the Chowki Mohalla area of Mumbai which was populated by mostly poor people. Despite having less money himself, he would treat the ones who couldn't afford it for free.

with Rajiv Gandhi

== Politics and education ==
As a student, he was elected secretary of the literary association and cultural society of Grant Medical College and also elected general secretary of the Muslim students union of Mumbai in the 1950s.

He contested and won his first election for the Maharashtra Legislative Assembly in Nagpada in 1977 representing the Janata Party. He was inducted into the cabinet as a minister of state for housing, finance, Waqf, labor and protocol.

In 1988, he was again a minister of state for Urban Development and Waqf as part of the Congress. As a minister, he was known for regular attendance at his office and keeping an open-door policy by granting all visitors easy access at Mumbai's Mantralaya.

He spoke for and participated in various public affairs. He was the president of the Hindustani Prachar Sabha founded by Mahatma Gandhi and a member of the Gandhi Smarak Nidhi. He orated many times in Marathi and also promoted the Marathi language and literature. He was associated with the Bharatiya Vidya Bhavan and a member of the court of the Aligarh Muslim University.

Dr. Jamkhanawala was the President of the educational institution Anjuman-I-Islam from 1983 to 2006. built and renovated several buildings under his leadership including orphanages.

== Personal life ==
Dr. Jamkhanawala loved reading and poetry. He died on 31 August 2008 in Mumbai.
