= Mohammad Yunus Saleem =

Indian politician

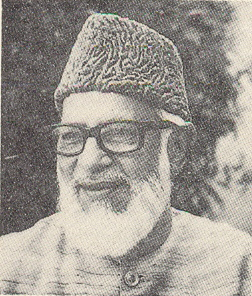

Governor of Bihar
- In office 16 February 1990 – 13 February 1991
- Preceded by: Gangadhar Ganesh Sohani (acting)
- Succeeded by: B. Satya Narayan Reddy (acting)

Member of Parliament, Rajya Sabha
- In office 3 April 1974 – 2 April 1980
- Constituency: Andhra Pradesh

Member of Parliament, Lok Sabha
- In office 1991-1996
- Preceded by: Yuvraj
- Succeeded by: Tariq Anwar
- Constituency: Katihar
- In office 1967-1971
- Preceded by: Ravi Narayana Reddy
- Succeeded by: K. Ramkrishna Reddy
- Constituency: Nalgonda

Personal details
- Born: 1912 Mahona, Lucknow district, United Provinces, British Raj
- Died: 15 January 2004 (aged 91–92) Delhi, India
- Party: Indian National Congress
- Education: Christian Mission College, Osmania University
- As of 26 September, 2006

Mohammad Yunus Saleem (1912 – 15 January 2004) was an Indian politician, scholar, and lawyer, who was also active in the religious field. The Mohammad Yunus Saleem Memorial Education Trust was established by his son Junaid Abdul Rehman to promote the study of the Quran.

== Early life ==
Born in 1912 in Mahona, district Lucknow, Saleem studied at the Christian Mission College in Lucknow then did his B.A. and L.L.B. at Osmania University in Hyderabad.

Before moving to Hyderabad, Yunus lived in a mosque in Lucknow with his father. When the Nizam of Hyderabad Mir Osman Ali Khan was in Lucknow on a state visit to see William Malcolm Hailey, home member of the Executive Council of the Governor-General of India, Yunus went to meet the Nizam and offered him a rare manuscript of the Quran. Impressed, the Nizam asked his Prime Minister Mir Yousuf Ali Khan, Salar Jung III to nominate him for a scholarship so that he could continue his studies. Yunus went to Hyderabad in anticipation, but never received his scholarship. He decided to remain in Hyderabad anyway and enrolled at the university, funding his studies by tutoring. He was keenly interested in Urdu and had been writing poems from a young age; in Hyderabad he added his pen name Saleem to his name.

As a lawyer during his early career, he worked as an assistant to the advocate Mohammed Wasi at Hyderabad High Court. He used to live in Advocate Mohammed Wasi house in Urdu Galli, now behind the Ram Krishna theatre in Hyderabad. He later practised at Andhra Pradesh High Court and also in the Supreme court.

== Political career ==
Yunus's political career began in 1967, as a Member of Parliament (MP) for the Indian National Congress from the Nalgonda constituency of the Lok Sabha. From 1967-71 he was Minister of Law, Justice, and Waqf, as well as Deputy Minister of Railways. In 1971 he contested the Aligarh constituency but lost. In 1974 he was elected to the Rajya Sabha from Andhra Pradesh.

When the Congress Party split in the late 1970s he was a member of the Parliamentary Board of Congress (Urs) and as the party localized to Maharashtra under Sharad Pawar, he joined Choudhary Charan Singh's Lok Dal. He was the Vice President of Lok Dal and also a member of its parliamentary board.

During the Congress Party's expulsion of V. P. Singh in 1987 and the formation of Jan Morcha, he joined the newly formed party. He played a role in bringing the parties together and in the formation of Janata Dal.

In 1990 he became the Governor of Bihar. In 1991 he again became an MP, from the Katihar constituency.

In 1996 he rejoined Congress and remained a member until his death. He died on 14 January 2004, following a brief illness, in his residence in Delhi. He had two daughters Zeba and Shehla, and his son Junaid Abdul Rehman, who lives in the United States.

== Publications ==
- Allah Noorus Samawaat wal Ard "God is the light of the Heavens and the Earth" is a collection and explanation of all verses of the Quran relating to Allah. Allah Noorus Samawat provides an insight into Islam's concept of God, His functions and His attributes. His preface to the book is semi-autobiographical and can be read here.
- Noor ul mubeen is his second book, a collection and explanation of all the verses of the Quran which explains what the Quran says about itself.
- He served as the founding member, Trustee and General Secretary of the Aiwan-e-Ghalib Society. He was the Founding member and President of the All India Khusro Society
- He has authored a book on Ghalib, titled Lughat-e-Ghalib is a referential thesaurus on the Diwan-e-Ghalib wherein uncommon and difficult words, idioms and phrases have been explained accompanied by illustrations of how the same words have been used by other poets. It has been published by the Khuda Baksh Library, Patna, Bihar.

Lok Sabha
Preceded by Ravi Narayana Reddy	Member of Parliament for Nalgonda; 1967-1971	Succeeded by K. Ramkrishna Reddy
Preceded by Yuvraj	Member of Parliament for Katihar; 1991-1996	Succeeded by Tariq Anwar
Rajya Sabha
Preceded by N/A	Member of Parliament from Andhra Pradesh; 3 April 1974-2 April 1980	Succeeded by N/A
Political offices
Preceded by Gangadhar Ganesh Sohani (acting)	Governor of Bihar; 16 February 1990-13 February 1991	Succeeded by B. Satya Narayan Reddy (acting)
