= V. C. Pande =

Indian civil servant

Vinod Chandra Pande
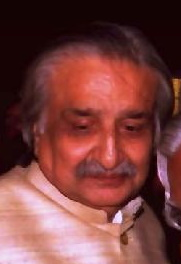

11th Governor of Arunachal Pradesh
- In office 12 June 2003 – 15 December 2004
- Chief Minister: Gegong Apang
- Preceded by: Arvind Dave
- Succeeded by: Shilendra Kumar Singh

17th Governor of Bihar
- In office 23 November 1999 – 12 June 2003
- Chief Minister: Rabri Devi; Nitish Kumar
- Preceded by: Suraj Bhan (Additional Charge)
- Succeeded by: Rama Jois

Governor of Jharkhand (Additional Charge)
- In office 4 February 2002 – 14 July 2002
- Chief Minister: Babulal Marandi
- Preceded by: Prabhat Kumar
- Succeeded by: Rama Jois

19th Cabinet Secretary of India
- In office 23 December 1989 – 11 December 1990
- Prime Minister: V. P. Singh
- Preceded by: T. N. Seshan
- Succeeded by: Naresh Chandra

Personal details
- Born: 16 February 1932 Jammu, Jammu and Kashmir, British Raj
- Died: 7 February 2005 (aged 72) Noida, Uttar Pradesh, India
- Education: Allahabad University

Vinod Chandra Pande (16 February 1932 – 7 February 2005) was an Indian Civil Servant of the Rajasthan Cadre, and was, notably, Cabinet Secretary in 1989–1990. He was a prolific writer and an erudite astrologer.

He was born to a family which contributed two other Cabinet Secretaries (B. D. Pande and Kamal Pande). His elder brother was noted scholar and historian Govind Chandra Pande

He was Cabinet Secretary from 23 December 1989 to 11 December 1990 under Prime Minister V. P. Singh (and earlier, revenue secretary under him when the latter was Finance Minister). They had earlier studied together at Allahabad University.

He served as Governor of Bihar (1999–2003), Jharkhand (briefly during 2002), and Arunachal Pradesh (2003–04), as an appointee of the Atal Bihari Vajpayee government.

He had been a bachelor. He was a scholar of Hindi, Pali, and Sanskrit, and a prolific writer in Hindi. He died in Noida, Uttar Pradesh, two months after leaving the governorship of Arunachal Pradesh.

Government offices
Preceded by Sunder Singh Bhandari	Governor of Bihar; 23 November 1999 – 12 June 2003	Succeeded by Mandagadde Rama Jois
Preceded by Prabhat Kumar	Governor of Jharkhand; 4 February 2002 – 14 July 2002	Succeeded by Mandagadde Rama Jois
Preceded by Arvind Dave	Governor of Arunachal Pradesh; 13 June 2003 – 15 December 2004	Succeeded by Shilendra Kumar Singh
