= List of governors of Manipur =

Governor of Manipur
- Emblem of Manipur

- Flag of India

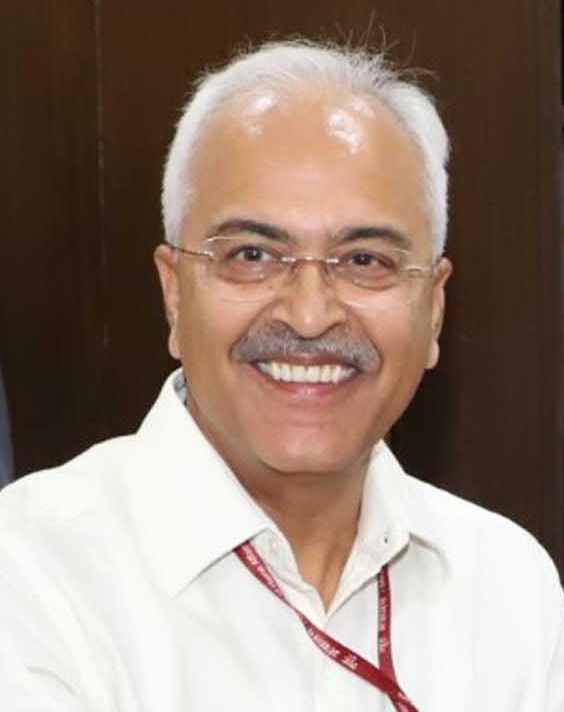
- Incumbent; Ajay Kumar Bhalla since 3 January 2025
- Style: His Excellency
- Residence: Lok Bhavan; Imphal
- Appointer: President of India
- Term length: At the pleasure of the president
- Inaugural holder: B. K. Nehru
- Formation: 21 January 1972; 54 years ago

The Governor of Manipur is the constitutional head of state of the Indian state of Manipur. The governor is appointed by the president of India. Though all official affairs of the state are administered and carried out in the name of the governor, the real executive power rests with the chief minister who is a member of the legislative assembly and is the leader of the majority party in the house. The official residence of the governor is Lok Bhavan.

The position of the governor of Manipur came into existence in January 1972. The first governor to be appointed was Braj Kumar Nehru, then Governor of Assam who also served as the governor of the other north-eastern states of Nagaland, Meghalaya, and Tripura. The current governor is Ajay Kumar Bhalla who has been in office since January 2025.

== List ==
Legend

- ^{†} Died in office
- ^{§} Transferred
- ^{‡} Resigned/removed

Color key

- indicates acting/additional charge

#	Portrait	Name (born – died)	Home state	Tenure in office			Appointer (President)
#	Portrait	Name (born – died)	Home state	From	To	Time in office	Appointer (President)
1		Braj Kumar Nehru; ICS (Retd) (1909–2001)	Uttar Pradesh	21 January 1972	20 September 1973	1 year, 242 days	V. V. Giri
2		Lallan Prasad Singh; ICS (Retd) (1912–1998)	Bihar	21 September 1973	11 August 1981	7 years, 323 days	V. V. Giri
3		S. M. H. Burney; IAS (Retd) (1924–2014)	Uttar Pradesh	11 August 1981	11 June 1984^{[§]} (Note: Transferred as the Governor of Haryana)	2 years, 305 days	Neelam Sanjiva Reddy
4		General; K. V. Krishna Rao (Retd); PVSM (1923–2016)	Andhra Pradesh	11 June 1984	10 July 1989^{[§]} (Note: Transferred as the Governor of Jammu and Kashmir)	5 years, 29 days	Zail Singh
5		Chintamani Panigrahi (1922–2000)	Orissa	10 July 1989	19 March 1993^{[‡]}	3 years, 252 days	Ramaswamy Venkataraman
6		K. V. Raghunatha Reddy (1924–2002) (Additional Charge)	Andhra Pradesh	20 March 1993	30 August 1993^{[§]} (Note: Transferred as the Governor of West Bengal)	163 days	Shankar Dayal Sharma
7		Lieutenant General; V. K. Nayar (Retd); PVSM SM (d. 2015)	–	30 August 1993	22 December 1994^{[‡]}	1 year, 114 days	Shankar Dayal Sharma
8		Oudh Narayan Shrivastava; IPS (Retd) (born 1935) (Additional charge till 11 November 1996)	Madhya Pradesh	23 December 1994	1 December 1999	4 years, 343 days	Shankar Dayal Sharma
9		Ved Marwah; IPS (Retd) (1934–2020)	National Capital Territory of Delhi	2 December 1999	12 June 2003^{[§]} (Note: Transferred as the Governor of Jharkhand)	3 years, 192 days	K. R. Narayanan
10		Arvind Dave; IPS (Retd) (born 1940)	Uttar Pradesh	13 June 2003	5 August 2004	1 year, 53 days	A. P. J. Abdul Kalam
11		Shivinder Singh Sidhu; IAS (Retd) (1929–2018)	Punjab	6 August 2004	22 July 2008^{[§]} (Note: Transferred as the Governor of Goa)	3 years, 351 days	A. P. J. Abdul Kalam
12		Gurbachan Jagat; IPS (Retd) (born 1942)	Chandigarh	23 July 2008	28 July 2013	5 years, 5 days	Pratibha Patil
13		Ashwani Kumar; IPS (Retd) (1950–2020) (Additional Charge)	Himachal Pradesh	29 July 2013	30 December 2013	154 days	Pranab Mukherjee
14		Vinod Kumar Duggal; IAS (Retd) (born 1944)	Punjab	31 December 2013	14 September 2014^{[‡]}	257 days	Pranab Mukherjee
15		Krishan Kant Paul; IPS (Retd) (born 1948) (Additional Charge)	Chandigarh	16 September 2014	15 May 2015	241 days	Pranab Mukherjee
16		Syed Ahmed (1943–2015)	Maharashtra	16 May 2015	27 September 2015^{[†]}	134 days	Pranab Mukherjee
17		V. Shanmuganathan (born 1949) (Additional Charge)	Tamil Nadu	30 September 2015	20 August 2016	325 days	Pranab Mukherjee
18		Najma Heptulla (born 1940)	Madhya Pradesh	21 August 2016	1 May 2018	1 year, 253 days	Pranab Mukherjee
19		Jagdish Mukhi (born 1942) (Acting)	National Capital Territory of Delhi	2 May 2018	30 May 2018	28 days	Ram Nath Kovind
(18)		Najma Heptulla (born 1940)	Madhya Pradesh	31 May 2018	26 June 2019	1 year, 26 days	Ram Nath Kovind
20		Padmanabha Balakrishna Acharya (1931–2023) (Acting)	Karnataka	27 June 2019	22 July 2019	25 days	Ram Nath Kovind
(18)		Najma Heptulla (born 1940)	Madhya Pradesh	23 July 2019	11 August 2021	2 years, 19 days	Ram Nath Kovind
21		Ganga Prasad Chaurasia (born 1939) (Additional Charge)	Bihar	12 August 2021	26 August 2021	14 days	Ram Nath Kovind
22		La. Ganesan (1945–2025)	Tamil Nadu	27 August 2021	21 February 2023^{[§]} (Note: Transferred as the Governor of Nagaland)	1 year, 178 days	Ram Nath Kovind
23		Anusuiya Uikey (born 1957)	Madhya Pradesh	22 February 2023	29 July 2024	1 year, 158 days	Droupadi Murmu
24		Lakshman Prasad Acharya (born 1954) (Additional Charge)	Uttar Pradesh	31 July 2024	2 January 2025	155 days	Droupadi Murmu
25		Ajay Kumar Bhalla; IAS (Retd.) (born 1960)	Punjab	3 January 2025	Incumbent	1 year, 283 days	Droupadi Murmu

== Oath ==
“I, A. B., do swear in the name of God/solemly affirm that I will faithfully execute the office of Governor (or discharge the functions of the Governor) of .............(name of the State) and will to the best of my ability preserve, protect and defend the Constitution and the law and that I will devote myself to the service and well-being of the people of ..………(name of the State).”

== See also ==
- Manipur
- Chief Minister of Manipur
- Governors of India
