= Prabhat Kumar =

Indian politician and civil servant

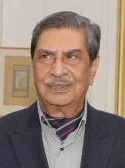

1st Governor of Jharkhand
- In office 15 November 2000 – 3 February 2002
- Chief Minister: Babulal Marandi
- Preceded by: Office Established
- Succeeded by: V. C. Pande

25th Cabinet Secretary of India
- In office 1 April 1998 – 31 October 2000
- Prime Minister: Atal Bihari Vajpayee
- Preceded by: T. S. R. Subramanian
- Succeeded by: T. R. Prasad

Personal details
- Born: 5 October 1940 (age 85) Allahabad, United Provinces, British India (present-day Uttar Pradesh, India)
- Profession: Civil servant, politician

Prabhat Kumar is a retired civil servant from India. An Indian Administrative Service officer of the 1963 batch, he served as the Cabinet Secretary between 1998 and 2000. Upon creation of the State of Jharkhand in November 2000, he was made the first governor.

== Biography ==
Kumar was born and brought up in Prayagraj, Uttar Pradesh. An Indian Administrative Service (IAS) officer of the 1963 batch and Uttar Pradesh cadre, Kumar served as secretary to the Ministry of Textiles before his appointment as the cabinet secretary.
