= Lok Bhavan, Ranchi =

Official residence of the Governor of Jharkhand

Lok Bhavan (Jharkhand)
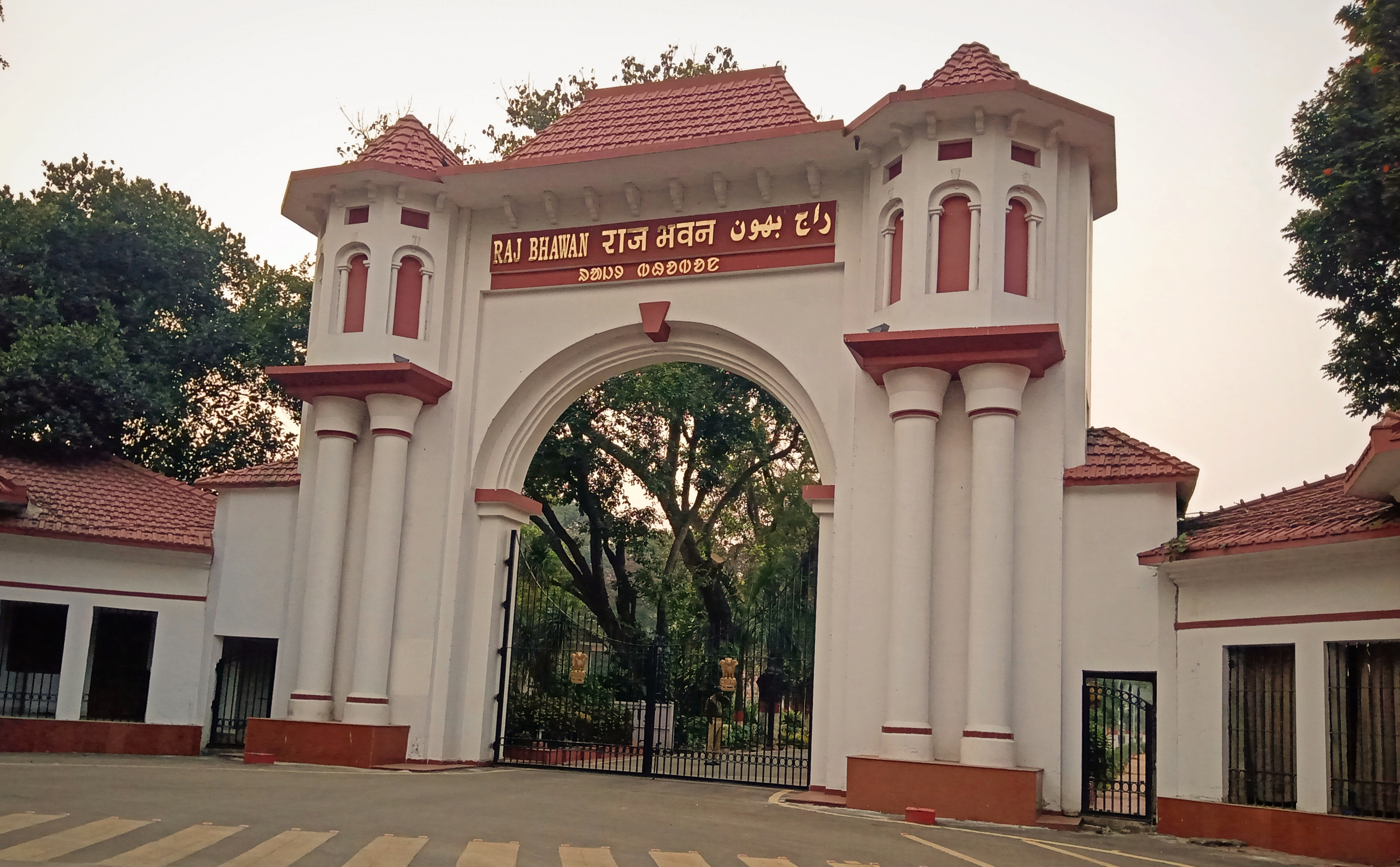
- Interactive map of the Lok Bhavan (Jharkhand) area

General information
- Coordinates: 23.381297°N 85.317533°E
- Current tenants: Santosh Gangwar
- Owner: Government of Jharkhand

References
- Website

Lok Bhavan formerly Raj Bhavan (translation: Government House) is the official residence of the governor of Jharkhand. It is located in the capital city of Ranchi, Jharkhand. The present governor of Jharkhand is Santosh Gangwar

== Building ==
The Raj Bhavan is spread over an area of 62 acres (250,000 m^{2}), The construction of the Raj Bhavan was started in 1930 and completed in March 1931 at an estimated cost of Rs. 700,000. It was designed by Ar.Sadlow Ballerd.

In the premises of Raj Bhavan there is Audrey House, which is now the Governor's Secretariat, was built much earlier by Captain Hannyington, who was the Deputy Commissioner of Chota Nagpur from 1850 to 1856.

== Gardens ==
In Raj Bhavan they are many lawns and gardens, which have been named after noted figures.

- Akbar garden has been newly developed in 2005 and has a beautiful collection of roses and seasonal flowers.
- Buddha garden, named after the Buddha, has a beautiful landscape and a green house.
- Ashoka, the main lawn has an area of approximately 52,000 sq ft (4,800 m^{2}),
- Murti garden has an area of approx. 15,000 sq ft (1,400 m^{2}) and the 'Lily pond' has an area of 12,000 sq ft (1,100 m^{2}).
- Mahatma Gandhi garden is in the south side of Raj Bhavan and it is a collection of medical plants. It has in its midst a beautiful fountain.
- Nakshatra Vana is the new garden which has been developed.

== See also ==
- Government Houses of the British Indian Empire
