= Sam Piroj Bharucha =

30th Chief Justice of India

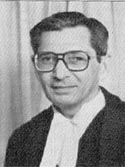

30th Chief Justice of India
- In office 1 November 2001 – 5 May 2002
- Appointed by: K. R. Narayanan
- Preceded by: Adarsh Sein Anand
- Succeeded by: Bhupinder Nath Kirpal

Judge of Supreme Court of India
- In office 1 July 1992 – 31 October 2001
- Nominated by: Madhukar Hiralal Kania
- Appointed by: K. R. Narayanan

13th Chief Justice of Karnataka High Court
- In office 1 November 1991 – 30 June 1992
- Nominated by: Ranganath Misra
- Appointed by: Ramaswamy Venkataraman
- Preceded by: Shanmughasundaram Mohan
- Succeeded by: S. B. Majumdar

Judge of Bombay High Court
- In office 19 September 1977 – 31 October 1991
- Nominated by: Mirza Hameedullah Beg
- Appointed by: Neelam Sanjiva Reddy

Personal details
- Born: 6 May 1937 (age 89) Gangtok, Sikkim, British India

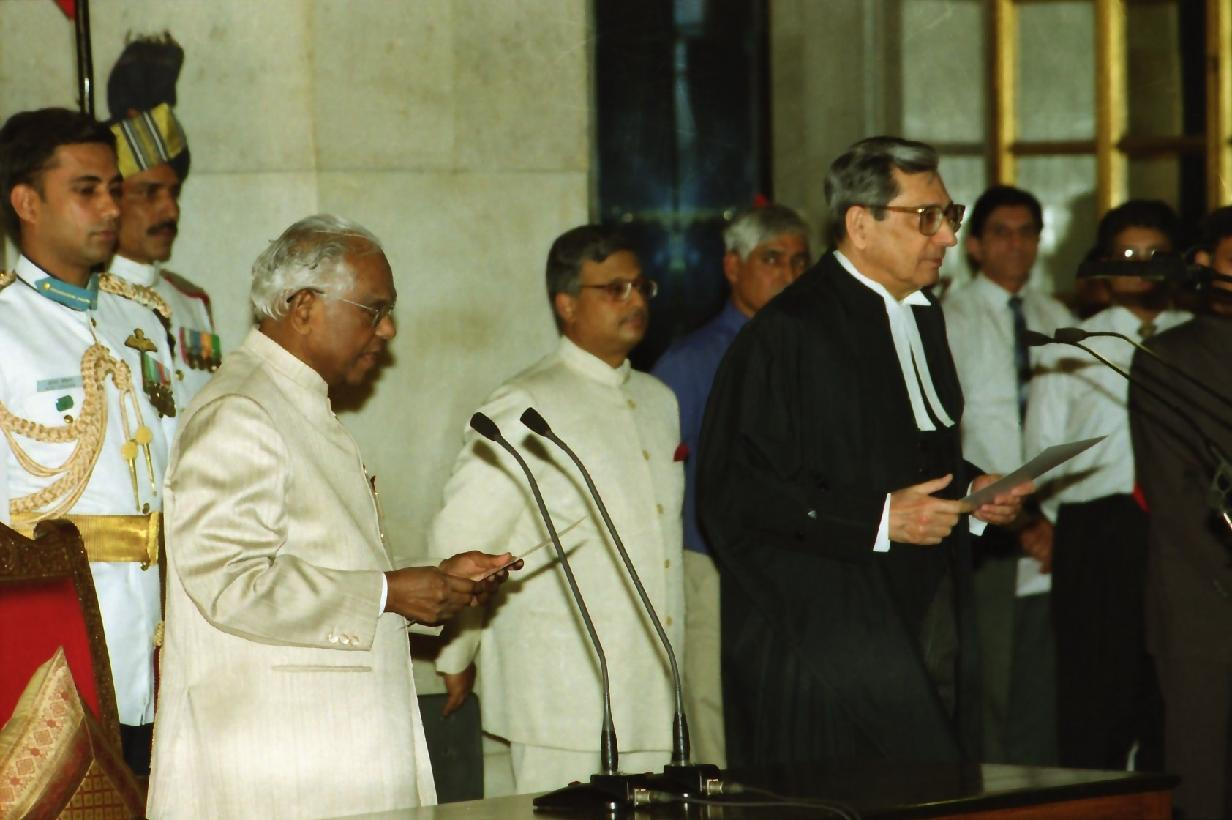
The President of India, K. R. Narayanan administering the oath of office of the Chief Justice of India to Sam Piroj Bharucha at the Ashok Hall of the Rashtrapati Bhavan

Sam Piroj Bharucha (6 May 1937) is a former Chief Justice of India, serving from November 2001 until his retirement in 2002.

He began his legal career as an advocate of the Bombay High Court in 1960, and was appointed an Additional Judge in 1977. His judgeship was made permanent in 1978, and in 1991 he was appointed Chief Justice of the Karnataka High Court. In 1992, he was appointed to the Supreme Court of India, and became Chief Justice in 2001.

Bharucha is responsible for many significant legal decisions. He was part of the five-judge constitutional panel which unanimously ruled on the 2001 dismissal of J. Jayalalithaa as Chief Minister of Tamil Nadu. It was the first and only such dismissal of a chief minister in India's history.

Over the course of his Supreme Court tenure, Bharucha authored 344 judgments and sat on 1,307 benches.

| Preceded by Adarsh Sein Anand | Chief Justice of India; 2 November 2001– 6 May 2002 | Succeeded by Bhupinder Nath Kirpal |
