= List of governors of Bihar =

Governor of Bihar
- Emblem of Bihar

- Flag of India

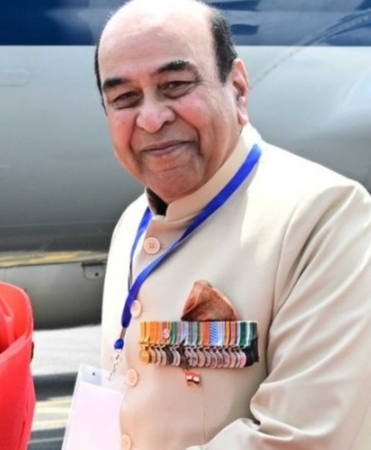
- Incumbent; Syed Ata Hasnain since 14 March 2026
- Style: His Excellency
- Residence: Lok Bhavan, Patna, Bihar
- Appointer: President of India
- Term length: At the pleasure of the president
- Precursor: Governor of Bihar and Orissa
- Website: governor.bih.nic.in

Location of Bihar in India.

The Governor of Bihar is the nominal head of the Indian state of Bihar. The governor is appointed by the President of India. Syed Ata Hasnain is the current governor of Bihar. Former President Zakir Husain and Ram Nath Kovind were two such governors of Bihar who succeeded on to become the President of India. Zakir Hussain was earlier succeeded to become the Vice President of India.

== Powers and functions ==
The governor has:

- Executive powers related to administration, appointments and removals,
- Legislative powers related to lawmaking and the state legislature, that is Vidhan Sabha or Vidhan Parishad, and
- Discretionary powers to be carried out according to the discretion of the Governor.

In his ex-officio capacity, the governor of Bihar is chancellor of the universities of Bihar (at present 12) as per the Acts of the Universities.

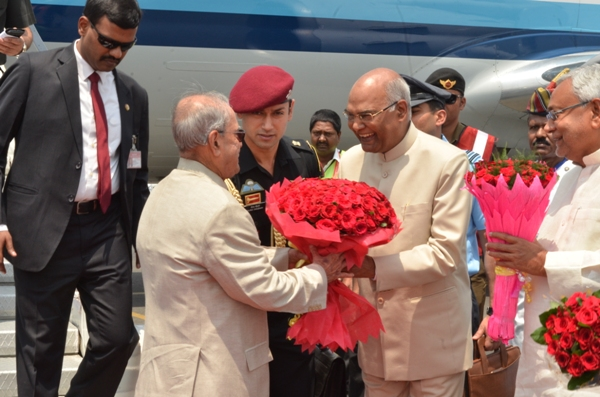
President Pranab Mukherjee received by Bihar Governor Ram Nath Kovind & Chief minister Nitish Kumar.

== List ==
Legend

- ^{†} Died in office
- ^{§} Transferred
- ^{‡} Resigned/removed

Color key

- indicates acting/additional charge

#	Portrait	Name (born – died)	Home state	Tenure in office			Appointer (President)
#	Portrait	Name (born – died)	Home state	From	To	Time in office	Appointer (President)
1		Jairamdas Daulatram (1891–1979)	Maharashtra	15 August 1947	11 January 1948	149 days	Lord Mountbatten (Governor-General)
2		Madhav Shrihari Aney (1880–1968)	Maharashtra	12 January 1948	14 June 1952	4 years, 154 days	Lord Mountbatten (Governor-General)
3		R. R. Diwakar (1894–1990)	Karnataka	15 June 1952	5 July 1957	5 years, 20 days	Rajendra Prasad
4		Zakir Husain (1897–1969)	Andhra Pradesh	6 July 1957	11 May 1962^{[‡]} (Note: Resigned to become the Vice President of India)	4 years, 309 days	Rajendra Prasad
5		M. A. Ayyangar (1891–1978)	Andhra Pradesh	12 May 1962	6 December 1967	5 years, 208 days	Rajendra Prasad
6		Nityanand Kanungo (1900–1988)	Orissa	7 December 1967	20 January 1971	3 years, 44 days	Zakir Husain
7		Justice; Ujjal Narayan Sinha; Chief Justice, Patna High Court (Acting)	Bihar	21 January 1971	31 January 1971	10 days	V. V. Giri
8		Dev Kant Barooah (1914–1996)	Assam	1 February 1971	4 February 1973	2 years, 3 days	V. V. Giri
9		Ramchandra Dhondiba Bhandare (1916–1988)	Maharashtra	4 February 1973	15 June 1976^{[§]} (Note: Transferred as the Governor of Andhra Pradesh)	3 years, 132 days	V. V. Giri
10		Jagannath Kaushal (1915–2001)	Chandigarh	16 June 1976	31 January 1979	2 years, 229 days	Fakhruddin Ali Ahmed
11		Justice; Krishna Ballabh Narayan Singh (1922–1999); Chief Justice, Patna High Court (Acting)	Bihar	31 January 1979	19 September 1979	231 days	Neelam Sanjiva Reddy
12		Akhlaqur Rahman Kidwai (1921–2016)	National Capital Territory of Delhi	20 September 1979	15 March 1985	5 years, 176 days	Neelam Sanjiva Reddy
13		Pendekanti Venkatasubbaiah (1921–1983)	Andhra Pradesh	15 March 1985	25 February 1988^{[§]} (Note: Transferred as the Governor of Karnataka)	2 years, 347 days	Zail Singh
14		Govind Narayan Singh (1920–2005)	Madhya Pradesh	26 February 1988	24 January 1989^{[‡]}	333 days	Ramaswamy Venkataraman
15		Justice; Dipak Kumar Sen (born 1927); Chief Justice, Patna High Court (Acting)	West Bengal	24 January 1989	28 January 1989	4 days	Ramaswamy Venkataraman
16		R. D. Pradhan; IAS (Retd) (1928–2020); Governor of Arunachal Pradesh (Additional Charge)	Maharashtra	29 January 1989	2 March 1989	32 days	Ramaswamy Venkataraman
17		Jagannath Pahadia (1932–2021)	Rajasthan	3 March 1989	2 February 1990^{[‡]}	336 days	Ramaswamy Venkataraman
18		Justice; Gangadhar Ganesh Sohani; Chief Justice, Patna High Court (Acting)	Madhya Pradesh	2 February 1990	16 February 1990	14 days	Ramaswamy Venkataraman
19		Mohammad Yunus Saleem (1912–2004)	Uttar Pradesh	16 February 1990	14 February 1991	363 days	Ramaswamy Venkataraman
20		B. Satya Narayan Reddy (1927–2012); Governor of Uttar Pradesh (Additional Charge)	Andhra Pradesh	14 February 1991	18 March 1991	32 days	Ramaswamy Venkataraman
21		Mohammad Shafi Qureshi (1928–2016)	Jammu and Kashmir	19 March 1991	13 August 1993^{[§]} (Note: Transferred as the Governor of Madhya Pradesh)	2 years, 147 days	Ramaswamy Venkataraman
22		Akhlaqur Rahman Kidwai (1921–2016)	National Capital Territory of Delhi	14 August 1993	26 April 1998	4 years, 255 days	Shankar Dayal Sharma
23		Sunder Singh Bhandari (1921–2005)	Rajasthan	27 April 1998	15 March 1999^{[§]} (Note: Transferred as the Governor of Gujarat)	322 days	K. R. Narayanan
24		Justice; Brij Mohan Lal (1937–2001); Chief Justice, Patna High Court (Acting)	National Capital Territory of Delhi	15 March 1999	5 October 1999	204 days	K. R. Narayanan
25		Suraj Bhan (1928–2006); Governor of Uttar Pradesh (Additional Charge)	Haryana	6 October 1999	22 November 1999	47 days	K. R. Narayanan
26		Vinod Chandra Pande; IAS (Retd) (1938–2005)	Uttar Pradesh	23 November 1999	12 June 2003^{[§]} (Note: Transferred as the Governor of Arunachal Pradesh)	3 years, 201 days	K. R. Narayanan
27		Justice (Retd); Mandagadde Rama Jois (1931–2021)	Karnataka	12 June 2003	31 October 2004^{[‡]}	1 year, 141 days	A. P. J. Abdul Kalam
28		Ved Marwah; IPS (Retd) (1934–2020); Governor of Jharkhand (Additional Charge)	National Capital Territory of Delhi	1 November 2004	4 November 2004	3 days	A. P. J. Abdul Kalam
29		Buta Singh (1934–2021)	Punjab	5 November 2004	29 January 2006^{[‡]}	1 year, 85 days	A. P. J. Abdul Kalam
30		Gopalkrishna Gandhi; IAS (Retd) (born 1945); Governor of West Bengal (Additional Charge)	National Capital Territory of Delhi	31 January 2006	21 June 2006	141 days	A. P. J. Abdul Kalam
31		R. S. Gavai (1929–2015)	Maharashtra	22 June 2006	9 July 2008^{[§]} (Note: Transferred as the Governor of Kerala)	2 years, 17 days	A. P. J. Abdul Kalam
32		R. L. Bhatia (1920–2021)	Punjab	10 July 2008	28 June 2009	353 days	Pratibha Patil
33		Devanand Konwar (1934–2020)	Assam	29 June 2009	21 March 2013^{[§]} (Note: Transferred as the Governor of Tripura)	3 years, 265 days	Pratibha Patil
34		D. Y. Patil (1935–2026)	Maharashtra	22 March 2013	26 November 2014	1 year, 249 days	Pranab Mukherjee
35		Keshari Nath Tripathi (1934–2023)	Uttar Pradesh	27 November 2014	15 August 2015	261 days	Pranab Mukherjee
36		Ram Nath Kovind (born 1945)	Uttar Pradesh	16 August 2015	20 June 2017^{[‡]} (Note: Resigned to become the President of India)	1 year, 308 days	Pranab Mukherjee
37		Keshari Nath Tripathi (1934–2023); Governor of West Bengal (Additional Charge)	Uttar Pradesh	20 June 2017	29 September 2017	101 days	Pranab Mukherjee
38		Satya Pal Malik (1946–2025)	Uttar Pradesh	30 September 2017	22 August 2018^{[§]} (Note: Transferred as the Governor of Jammu and Kashmir)	326 days	Ram Nath Kovind
39		Lalji Tandon (1935–2020)	Uttar Pradesh	23 August 2018	28 July 2019^{[§]}	339 days	Ram Nath Kovind
40		Phagu Chauhan (born 1948)	Uttar Pradesh	29 July 2019	16 February 2023^{[§]} (Note: Transferred as the Governor of Meghalaya)	3 years, 202 days	Ram Nath Kovind
41		Rajendra Arlekar (born 1954)	Goa	17 February 2023	1 January 2025^{[§]}	1 year, 319 days	Droupadi Murmu
42		Arif Mohammad Khan (born 1951)	Uttar Pradesh	2 January 2025	13 March 2026	1 year, 70 days	Droupadi Murmu
43		Lieutenant General; Syed Ata Hasnain (Retd); PVSM AVSM UYSM SM VSM** (born 1953)	Uttarakhand	14 March 2026	Incumbent	218 days	Droupadi Murmu

== Timeline ==
Timeline of Bihar governors

== Oath ==
Main, [Name], Ishwar ki shapath leta hoon (ya nishtha se pratigya karta hoon) ki main sachhe mann se Governor (Rajyapal) ke roop mein [State Name] ke pad ka karyabhar sambhalunga (ya zimmedari uthaunga). Main apni poori kabiliyat se Samvidhan (Constitution) aur kanoon (Law) ki raksha, suraksha aur bachaav karunga, aur main apne aap ko [State Name] ki janta ki seva aur kalyan (well-being) mein samarpit karunga."

== See also ==
- Governor (India)
- Chief Minister of Bihar
- List of governors of Bihar and Orissa Province
