= 2011 in India =

- Centuries: 19th; 20th; 21st
- Decades: 1990s; 2000s; 2010s; 2020s
- See also: List of years in India; Timeline of Indian history

Events in the year 2011 in the Republic of India.

== Incumbents ==
Photo	Post	Name
	(India) President	Pratibha Patil
	(India) Vice President	Mohammad Hamid Ansari
	(India) Prime Minister	Manmohan Singh
	(India) Chief Justice	S. H. Kapadia

=== Governors ===
Post	Name
Andhra Pradesh	E. S. L. Narasimhan
Arunachal Pradesh	Joginder Jaswant Singh
Assam	Janaki Ballabh Patnaik
Bihar	Devanand Konwar
Chhattisgarh	Shekhar Dutt
Goa	Shivinder Singh Sidhu (until 27 August); Kateekal Sankaranarayanan (starting 27 August)
Gujarat	Kamala Beniwal
Haryana	Jagannath Pahadia
Himachal Pradesh	Urmila Singh
Jammu and Kashmir	Narinder Nath Vohra
Jharkhand	M. O. H. Farook (until 3 September); Syed Ahmed (starting 3 September)
Karnataka	Hansraj Bhardwaj
Kerala	R. S. Gavai (until 7 September); M. O. H. Farook (starting 7 September)
Madhya Pradesh	Rameshwar Thakur (until 7 September); Ram Naresh Yadav (starting 7 September)
Maharashtra	Kateekal Sankaranarayanan
Manipur	Gurbachan Jagat
Meghalaya	Ranjit Shekhar Mooshahary
Mizoram	M. M. Lakhera (until 2 September); Vakkom Purushothaman (starting 2 September)
Nagaland	Nikhil Kumar
Odisha	Murlidhar Chandrakant Bhandare
Punjab	Shivraj Vishwanath Patil
Rajasthan	Shivraj Patil
Sikkim	Balmiki Prasad Singh
Tamil Nadu	Surjit Singh Barnala (until 30 August); Konijeti Rosaiah (starting 30 August)
Tripura	Dnyandeo Yashwantrao Patil
Uttar Pradesh	Banwari Lal Joshi
Uttarakhand	Margaret Alva
West Bengal	M.K. Narayanan

== Events ==
- National income - ₹87,363,287 million

=== January - June ===
- 1 January -
  - Arabinda Rajkhowa, chairman of ULFA, was released on bail from the Guwahati central prison.
  - India and Pakistan exchange the annual lists of their nuclear installations and facilities under the Agreement on the Prohibition of Attack against Nuclear Installations, which was signed on 31 December 1988.
  - Nagesh Pydah assumed charge as Chairman and Managing Director of the Oriental Bank of Commerce.
  - The amendment to the Indo-Bhutan Treaty of Peace and Friendship (1949) comes into effect, removing India’s role in controlling Bhutan’s foreign policy and ending Bhutan’s status as an Indian protected state, thereby making Bhutan fully independent of India. With this, official Indian maps stopped showing Bhutan as part of India and began depicting it as a separate country. The coming into force of the new treaty in 2011 also removed the requirement for Bhutan to obtain India’s permission for arms imports.
- 6 January - Union Home Ministry publishes Srikrishna committee on Telangana online.
- 14 January- 102 pilgrims dies due to stampede in Sabarimala (Kerala).
- 20 January - Prime Minister of India, Dr. Manmohan Singh launches Mobile number portability in India.
- 21 January - Karnataka Governor sanctions prosecution of CM B.S.Yeddyurappa.
- following submission of its report.
- 25 January - Yashwant Sonawane, Additional District Collector of Malegaon burnt alive by oil mafia at Manmad near Nashik (Maharashtra).
- Suresh Kalmadi sacked as Chairman of Commonwealth Games Organizing Committee.
- Former Telecom Minister A.Raja sent to Tihar Jail in 2G spectrum case.
- Bombay High Court upholds death penalty for Ajmal Kasab.
- Ahmedabad court convicts 31, acquits 63 in Godhra train burning case.
- 34th National Games Held in Ranchi, Jharkhand.
- 22 February - Kidnapped Malkangiri Collector released by Maoists.
- 3 March - Supreme Court strikes down CVC PJ Thomas' appointment.
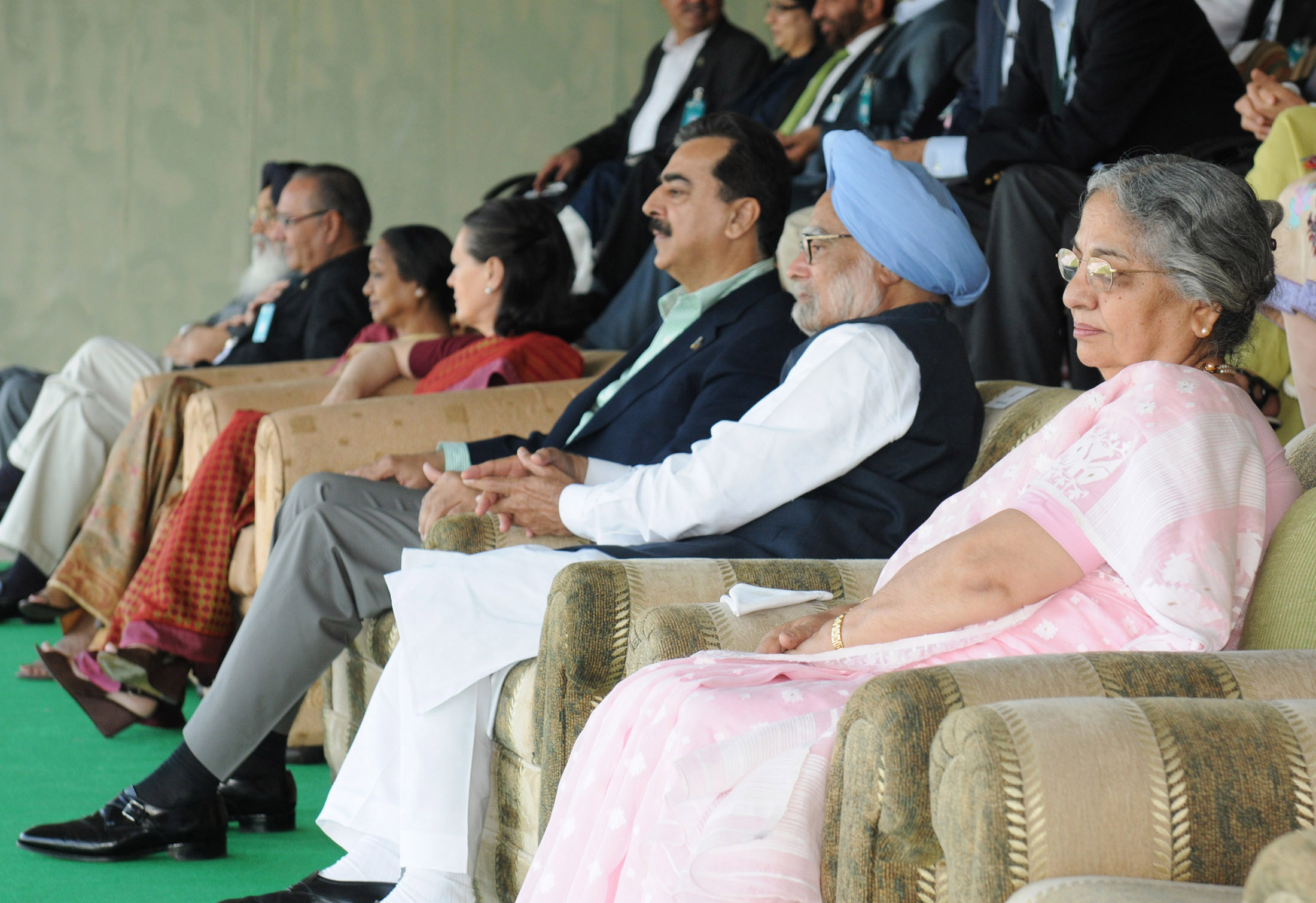
- The Prime Minister of India, Dr. Manmohan Singh and the Prime Minister of Pakistan, Mr. Yousuf Raza Gilani watching the Indo-Pak World Cup semi-final, at the Punjab Cricket Association stadium, in Mohali on March 30, 2011.
  PM Manmohan Singh and PM Gilani of Pakistan engage in cricket diplomacy on the occasion of India-Pakistan semi final match in Cricket World Cup 2011.
- Supreme Court dismisses Aruna Shanbaug's euthanasia plea.
- Hasan Ali remanded to judicial custody.
- Saina Nehwal clinches Swiss Open Grand Prix.
- DGCA revokes licenses of 14 fake pilots.
- Census 2011 shows increase of 181 million in total population.
- 2 April – India beat Sri Lanka and wins the 2011 Cricket World Cup.
- 30 April - Dorjee Khandu, Chief Minister of Arunachal Pradesh since 2007, dies in a helicopter crash.
- Anna Hazare undertakes fast for Jan Lokpal Bill at Jantar Mantar, New Delhi.
- Supreme Court grants bail to civil rights activist Binayak Sen.
- Visit of Prime Minister Abhisit Vejjajiva of Thailand to India.
- Five corporate honchos (Sanjay Chandra of Unitech; Gautam Doshi, Surender Pipara and Hari Nair of Reliance ADAG; Vinod Goenka of Swan Telecom) arrested in 2G spectrum case.
- 2011 I-League 2nd Division ends.
- Mamata Banerjee sworn in as the first woman and 8th Chief Minister of West Bengal.
- Prime Minister Manmohan Singh announces aid of ₹ 225 billion for African countries to develop infrastructure facilities on the eve of IInd Indo-Africa summit.
- J.Jayalalithaa, Oommen Chandy, Tarun Gogoi and N. Rangaswamy takes over as Chief Ministers of Tamil Nadu, Kerala, Assam and Puducherry respectively, as a result of assembly elections.
- Supreme Court quashes Karnataka Speaker's decision to disqualify 16 MLA's.
- German Chancellor Angela Merkel conferred Jawaharlal Nehru Award for International Understanding for 2009 by President Pratibha Patil.
- India ratifies UN protocol against human trafficking.
- Chennai Super Kings win the IPL for the second consecutive time.
- 2010–11 I-League: Salgaocar FC won the title by beating JCT FC 2-0 in the final match of the season.
- 30 May - West Bengal defeats Manipur to win Santosh Trophy
- Senior journalist and investigations editor with English newspaper 'Mid-Day', J. Dey, is shot dead in Mumbai.
- Election Commission of India launches the IIDEM (India International Institute of Democracy and Election Management).

=== June - December ===
- New Zealand Prime Minister John Key visits India.
- India gets first e-waste management rules.
- India ranks 123rd on the global environment index.
- Supreme Court appoints committee to examine the secret chambers of Sri Padmanabhaswamy Temple, Kerala.
- 26 killed in a series of bomb-blasts in Mumbai.
- Gorkhaland Territorial Administration (GTA) agreement signed.
- India-Bangladesh ink border management deal.
- 18 July – India's 25th nuclear power plant being built at Rawatbhata, Rajasthan.
- Newly formed National Green Tribunal (NGT) conducts its first sitting.
- Reserve Bank of India issues draft guidelines for new bank licences.
- Nation celebrates Independence Day on 15 August.
- Parliament passes sense of the house resolution on Lokpal bill.
- Sustainable Competitiveness Report 2011 presented, Delhi is first.
- 6.8 earthquake in Sikkim, tremors across India on 18 September.
- Land Acquisition, Rehabilitation and Resettlement Bill, 2011 presented in lok sabha.
- PM Manmohan Singh visits Dhaka on a landmark visit.
- 2011 Durand Cup
- 2011 Indian Federation Cup
- 1 September - Bhanwari Devi murder case
- F1 2011 Race comes to India at the Buddh International Circuit, Noida.
- 7 billionth baby born on 31 October 2011, Nargis in Uttar Pradesh.
- Saving Bank Interest rate decontrolled by RBI.
- National Manufacturing Policy cleared by Cabinet.
- Planning Commission releases the second India Human Development Report (HDR) 2011.
- President of Afghanistan, Hamid Karzai, visits India.
- Chhattisgarh police superintendent Ankit Garg is accused of the torture of schoolteacher and alleged Naxalite Soni Sori.
- Maoist leader Kishenji killed in encounter in West Bengal.
- Companies Bill and Pension Bill cleared by Cabinet.
- Indian representative elected to head the Joint Inspection Unit, the UN's only external oversight body.
- India ranks 134th on UN Human Development Index.
- Longest rail (4286 km) of India, Vivek Express, is flagged off.
- Sonia Gandhi (11th) and Manmohan Singh (19th) figures among the top 20 most powerful people on earth in the Forbes list.
- More than 50 killed in fire accident at AMRI hospital, Kolkata.
- 14 December - More than 150 dies due to West Bengal hooch tragedy
- Court directs 21 social networking websites to take off offensive content.
- Lok Sabha passes Lokpal Bill, Hazare cancels fast due to lukewarm response at Mumbai.
- 30 December - Cyclone Thane makes landfall andclaims 33 lives in Tamil Nadu and Puducherry.

=== Date unknown ===
- M. Dutta Ray Trophy is abolished.

== Sports ==
=== Athletics ===
- 3 January – National School Athletics Meet begin at Pune

=== Cricket ===
==== Domestic season ====
- Ranji Trophy 2010–11
- Duleep Trophy 2010–11
- Deodhar Trophy 2010–11
- Vijay Hazare Trophy 2010–11
- 2011 Indian Premier League
- 2011 Irani Trophy
- 2011 Inter-State T20 Championship
- 2011 BCCI Corporate Trophy
- 2011 Syed Mushtaq Ali Trophy
- Ranji Trophy 2011–12
- Duleep Trophy 2011–12
- Deodhar Trophy 2011–12
- Vijay Hazare Trophy 2011–12

==== International ====
Test matches

- India – South Africa 3 Test Series, December 2010 – January 2011 (Result Drawn 1-1).
- India – West Indies 3 Test Series, June – July 2011 (Result India 1-0).
- India – England 4 Test Series, July – August 2011 (Result England 4-0).
- West Indies – India 3 Test Series, November 2011 (Result India 2-0).
- India – Australia 4 Test Series, December 2011 – January 2012 (Result Australia 4-0).

One Day matches

- India – South Africa 5 match Series, January 2011 (Result South Africa 3-2).
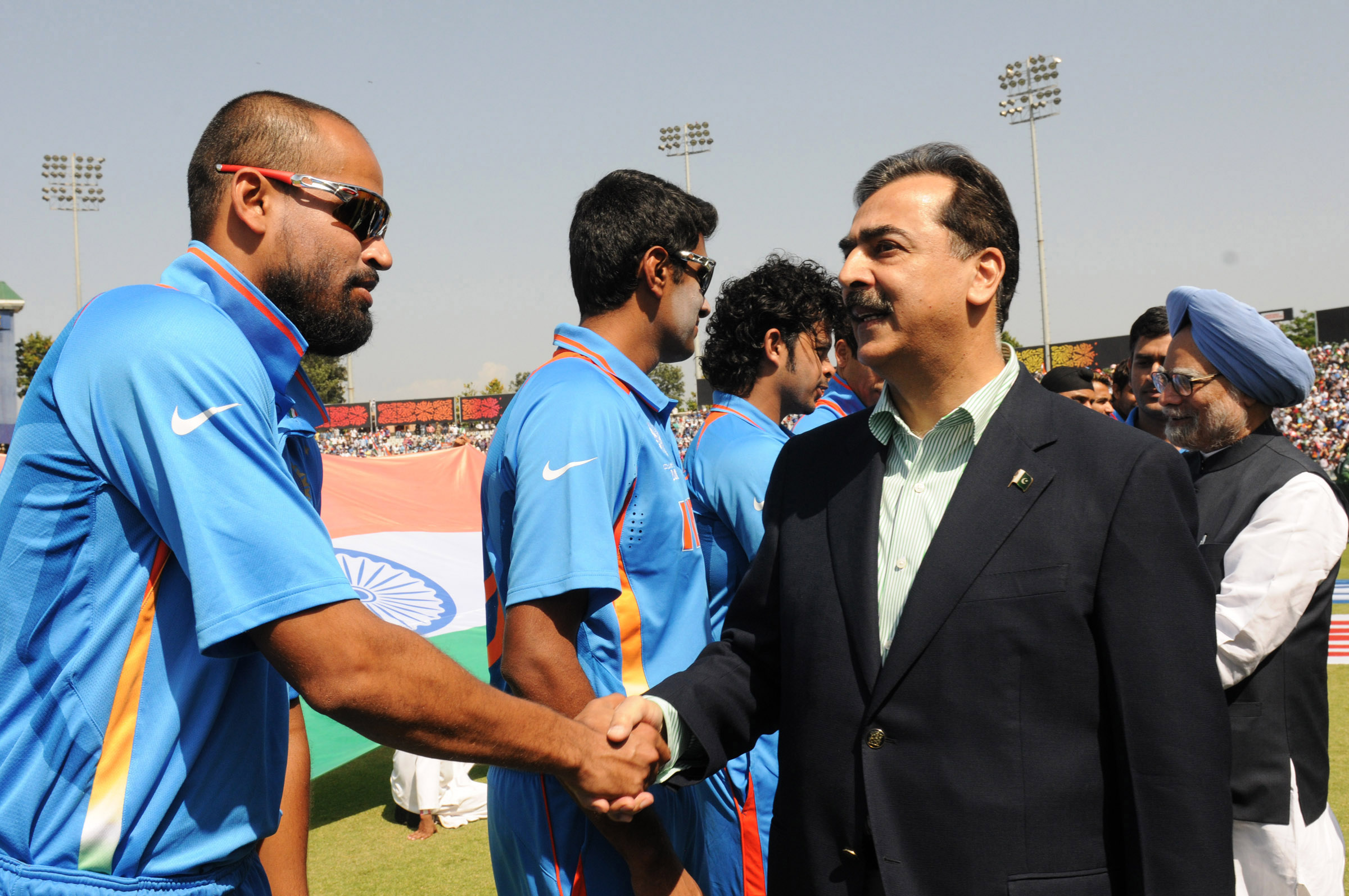
- Indian Prime Minister Dr. Manmohan Singh and the Prime Minister of Pakistan, Mr. Yousuf Raza Gilani interacting with the Indian Cricket Team before the World Cup semi-final match, at the Punjab Cricket Association stadium, in Mohali on March 30, 2011.
  India wins ICC world cup 2011 defeating Sri Lanka in finals.
- India – West Indies 5 match Series, June 2011 (Result India 3-2).
- India – England 5 match Series, September 2011 (Result England 3-0).
- England – India 5 match Series, October 2011 (Result India 5-0).
- West Indies – India 5 match Series, November – December 2011 (Result India 4-1).

T-20 matches

- West Indies v India at Port of Spain – 4 June 2011.
- England v India at Manchester – 31 August 2011.
- India v England at Kolkata – 29 October 2011.

=== Football ===
==== Senior ====
- 2010–11 I-League
- 2011–12 I-League
- 2011 Indian Shield
- 2011 Indian Federation Cup
- 2011 Durand Cup
- 2011 Santosh Trophy
- 2011 I-League 2nd Division

==== Youth ====
- 2011 BC Roy Trophy
- 2011 Dutta Ray Trophy
- 2010–11 Mir Iqbal Hussain Trophy
- 2010–12 Mir Iqbal Hussain Trophy
- Subroto Cup Football Tournament

== Deaths ==
=== January – April ===
- 2 January – Bali Ram Bhagat, 88, politician, member of the Indian National Congress (INC), and former Lok Sabha speaker (born 1922)
- 10 January – Vivek Shauq, 47, actor, comedian, writer, and singer (born 1963)
- 17 January – Gita Dey, 79, Bengali actress (born 1931)
- 21 January – E. V. V. Satyanarayana, 54, film director, screenwriter and producer (born 1956)
- 24 January – Bhimsen Joshi, 88, Hindustani Classical vocalist (born 1922)
- 28 January – Sushil Kumar Dhara, 99, revolutionary in British India and a political leader after Indian Independence in 1947 (born 1911)
- 3 February – Machan Varghese, 50, Malayalam film actor and mimicry artist (born 1960)
- 12 February – Vipindas, 72, cinematographer and director (born 1938)
- 19 February – Suresh Babu, 58, long jumper (born 1953)
- 20 February – Malaysia Vasudevan, 66, actor and playback singer (born 1944)
- 21 February
  - Aranmula Ponnamma, 96, Malayalam film actress (born 1914)
  - Premananda, 59, religious guru and monk who founded the Premananda ashram (born 1951)
- 23 February
  - Mullapudi Venkata Ramana, 79, Telugu screenwriter and film producer (born 1931)
  - Nirmala Srivastava, 87, founder and guru of Sahaja Yoga (born 1923)
- 24 February – Anant Pai (Uncle Pai), 81, educationalist and comics writer (born 1929)
- 1 March – Fateh Singh Rathore, 72, wildlife conservationist (born 1938)
- 3 March
  - Goga Kapoor, 70, film actor (born 1940)
  - Venkatraman Radhakrishnan, 81, space scientist and member of the Royal Swedish Academy of Sciences (born 1929)
- 4 March – Arjun Singh, 80, politician (born 1930)
- 10 March – Baliram Kashyap, 74, politician (born 1936)
- 12 March – Kumar Indrajitsinhji, 73, cricketer (born 1937)
- 19 March – Navin Nischol, 65, actor (born 1946)
- 20 March – Bob Christo, Indian actor of Australian origin (born 1938)
- 1 April – Varkey Vithayathil, 83, cardinal and religious leader (born 1927)
- 3 April – Rafique Alam, 81, politician (born 1929)
- 5 April – Sujatha, 58, actress (born 1952)
- 12 April – Sachin Bhowmick, 80, Hindi film writer and director (born 1930)
- 17 April – Bhawani Singh, 79, titular Maharaja of Jaipur (born 1931)
- 22 April – Madhava Gudi, 72, Hindustani classical vocalist (born 1941)
- 24 April – Sathya Sai Baba, 84, guru, spiritual leader & educator (born 1926)
- 30 April – Dorjee Khandu, 56, politician, Chief Minister of Arunachal Pradesh (born 1955)

=== May – December ===
- 13 May – Badal Sarkar, 85, dramatist and theatre director (born 1925)
- 15 May – Mahendra Singh Tikait, 76, farmer leader and President of the Bharatiya Kisan Union (born 1935)
- 3 June – Bhajan Lal, 80, politician and three-time Chief Minister of Haryana (born 1930)
- 7 June – Nataraja Ramakrishna, 88, dance guru (born 1923)
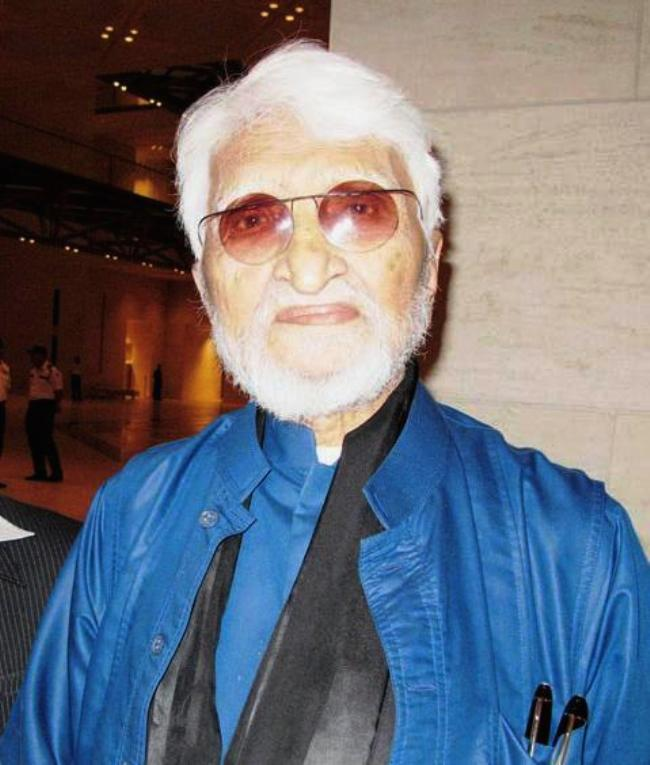
- M.F. Hussain
  9 June – M. F. Husain, 95, painter (born 1915)
- 11 June – Jyotirmoy Dey, 55, journalist, crime and investigations editor for Mid-Day, and an expert on the Mumbai underworld (born 1955)
- 14 June – Asad Ali Khan, 74, musician (born 1937)
- 18 June – John Perumattam, 89, Catholic hierarch (born 1921)
- 21 June
  - Kothapalli Jayashankar, 76, educator and politician (born 1934)
  - Suresh Tendulkar, 72, economist and former chief of the National Statistical Commission (born 1939)
- 29 June – K. D. Sethna, 106, poet, scholar, writer, philosopher, and cultural critic (born 1904)
- 2 July – Chaturanan Mishra, 86, politician and trade unionist (born 1925)
- 6 July – Mani Kaul, 66, film director (born 1944)
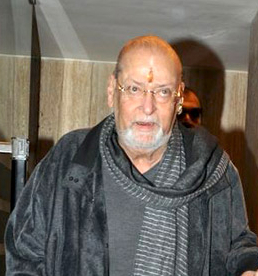
- Shammi Kapoor
  14 August – Shammi Kapoor, 79, actor (born 1931)
- 18 August – Johnson Master, 58, film score composer and music director (born 1953)
- 22 September – Mansoor Ali Khan Pataudi, 70, cricketer (born 1941)
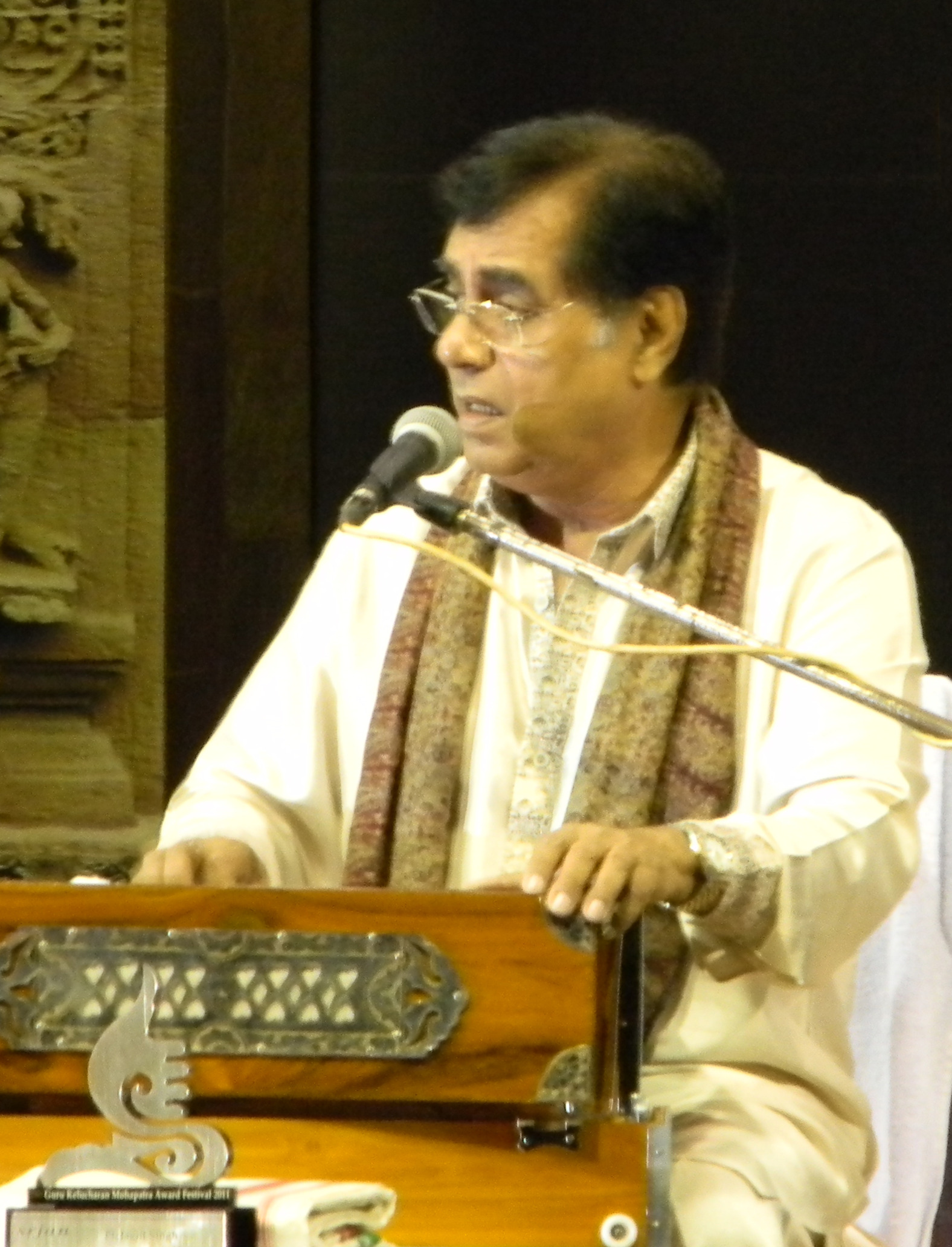
- Jagjit Singh
  10 October – Jagjit Singh, 70, ghazal singer, composer, musician (born 1941)
- 5 November – Bhupen Hazarika, 85, playback singer, lyricist, musician, poet, actor, filmmaker, and politician from Assam (born 1926)
- 9 November – Har Gobind Khorana, Indian-born American Nobel biochemist (born 1922)
- 27 November – Ustad Sultan Khan, 71, sarangi player and classical vocalist (born 1940)
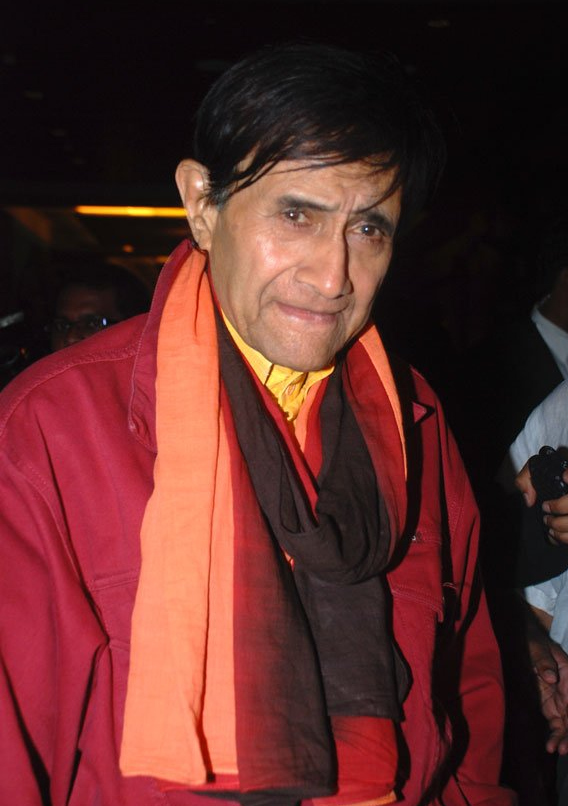
- Dev Anand
  4 December – Dev Anand, 88, actor, writer, director, and producer (born 1923)
- 25 December – Satyadev Dubey, 75, actor, playwright, screenwriter, and director (born 1936)
- 26 December – S. Bangarappa, 79, former Chief Minister of Karnataka (born 1933)

== Major Public Holidays ==
- 26 January – Republic Day (National holiday)
- 20 February – Maha Shivaratri (Hindu Holiday)
- 8 March – Holi (Hindu Holiday)
- 4 April – Gudi Padwa (Hindu New Year)
- 15 August – Independence Day (National holiday)
- 19 August – Pateti (Parsi New Year)
- 21 August – Krishna Janmashtami (Hindu Holiday)
- 31 August – Eid ul-Fitr (Islam Holiday)
- 1 September – Ganesh Chaturthi (First day of 10 days long Ganesh Festival)
- 11 September – Anant Chaturdashi (Ganesh Visharjan/Last Day of 10 days long Ganesh Festival)
- 2 October – Gandhi Jayanti (National holiday)
- 6 October – Dassera (Hindu Holiday)
- 26 October – Diwali (Hindu Holiday)
- 7 November – Bakrid (Islam Holiday)
- 10 November – Guru Nanak Jayanti (Sikh Holiday)
- 25 December – Christmas (Christian Holiday)

== See also ==
- 2012 in India
- 2010 in India
