= 2008 in India =

- Centuries: 19th; 20th; 21st
- Decades: 1980s; 1990s; 2000s; 2010s; 2020s
- See also: List of years in India; Timeline of Indian history

Events in the year 2008 in the Republic of India.

== Incumbents ==
Photo	Post	Name
	(India) President	Pratibha Patil
	(India) Vice President	Mohammad Hamid Ansari
	(India) Prime Minister	INC Dr. Manmohan Singh
	(India) Chief Justice	K. G. Balakrishnan

=== Governors ===
Post	Name
Andhra Pradesh	N. D. Tiwari
Arunachal Pradesh	K. Sankaranarayanan (until 26 January); Joginder Jaswant Singh (starting 26 January)
Assam	Ajai Singh (until 4 July); Shiv Charan Mathur (starting 4 July)
Bihar	R. S. Gavai (until 9 July); R. L. Bhatia (starting 4 July)
Chhattisgarh	E. S. L. Narasimhan
Goa	S. C. Jamir (until 21 July); Shivinder Singh Sidhu (starting 21 July)
Gujarat	Nawal Kishore Sharma
Haryana	Akhlaqur Rahman Kidwai
Himachal Pradesh	Vishnu Sadashiv Kokje (until 19 July); Prabha Rau (starting 19 July)
Jammu and Kashmir	Srinivas Kumar Sinha (until 25 June); Narinder Nath Vohra (starting 25 June)
Jharkhand	Kateekal Sankaranarayanan (until 21 January); M. O. H. Farook (starting 22 January)
Karnataka	Rameshwar Thakur
Kerala	R. L. Bhatia (until 10 July); R. S. Gavai (starting 11 July)
Madhya Pradesh	Balram Jakhar
Maharashtra	S.M. Krishna (until 5 March); S.C. Jamir (starting 5 March)
Manipur	Shivinder Singh Sidhu (until 22 July); Gurbachan Jagat (starting 23 July)
Meghalaya	Shivinder Singh Sidhu (until 30 June); Ranjit Shekhar Mooshahary (starting 1 July)
Mizoram	M. M. Lakhera
Nagaland	K. Sankaranarayanan (until 28 July); Gurbachan Jagat (28 July-14 October); Nikhil Kumar (starting 15 October)
Odisha	Murlidhar Chandrakant Bhandare
Punjab	Sunith Francis Rodrigues (until 22 January); Shivraj Vishwanath Patil (starting 22 January)
Rajasthan	Shilendra Kumar Singh (until 1 December); Prabha Rau (starting 2 December)
Sikkim	Sudarshan Agarwal (until 8 July); Balmiki Prasad Singh (starting 8 July)
Tamil Nadu	Surjit Singh Barnala
Tripura	Dinesh Nandan Sahay
Uttar Pradesh	T. V. Rajeswar
Uttarakhand	Banwari Lal Joshi
West Bengal	Gopalkrishna Gandhi

== Events ==
- National income - ₹55,141,524 million

=== January - February ===
- 10 January – Indian car manufacturer Tata launches the Nano, claimed to be the world's cheapest car.
- 2 February – The activists of Maharashtra Navnirman Sena (MNS) try to disrupt a press conference of Samajwadi Party leader Amar Singh in Mumbai.
- 2 February – Baba Ram Rahim Gurmeet Singh, the head of the Sirsa-based Dera Sacha Sauda sect escaped a bomb blast near Nilokheri in Karnal district of Haryana.
- 3 February – Members of teams trying to conduct social audit of the National Rural Employment Guarantee Scheme (NREGS) were attacked in Manohar Thana block of Jhalwar district in Rajasthan.
- 5 February – The Orissa government decides to provide a monthly pension of ₹ 200 to HIV positive persons under the State-sponsored 'Madhu Babu Pension Yojana.'
- 7 February – Union Health and Family Welfare Minister Anbumani Ramadoss dedicates to the nation the first in-vitro fertilisation (IVF) facility in the public sector set up at the All-India Institute of Medical Sciences (AIIMS) in New Delhi.
- 12 February – "Year of Russia in India" was inaugurated jointly by Prime Minister Manmohan Singh and his Russian counterpart Victor Zubkov in New Delhi.
- 13 February – Priyaranjan Dasmunsi, Saifuddin Soz and Suresh Pachauri are made governors of West Bengal, Jammu and Kashmir, and Madhya Pradesh units of the Congress respectively.
- 15 February – The Election Commission issues notice to Congress president Sonia Gandhi seeking her response to an allegation that she had incurred disqualification as member of Parliament under Article 102(1)(d) of the Constitution for accepting the Order of Leopold (Belgium) from the King of Belgium in November 2006.
- 19 February – Viswapati Trivedi becomes the Joint Chairman-cum-Managing Director of the National Aviation Company of India Limited (NACIL) (now Air India).
- 20 February – The former Queen Mother of Jaipur Gayatri Devi sat on a dharna near the Moti Doongri Fort protesting encroachment, by the land mafia, of land she donated.
- 24 February – In an affidavit filed before the Gujarat High Court, the CID has officially implicated former Gujarat Additional Director General of Police, D. G. Vanzara, as the "chief conspirator" in the Sohrabuddin fake encounter case.
- 24 February – Tarun Vijay joins Dr. Syama Prasad Mookerjee Research Foundation, the BJP's newly created think tank, as its director. He has been the chief editor of the Rashtriya Swayamsevak Sangh organ Panchjanya.
- 26 February – Ratakonda Dayakar named India's new Ambassador to Sweden. Dayakar is 1976 batch IFS officer.
- 26 February – Union Agriculture Minister Sharad Pawar predicts the foodgrain production to reach the record level of 219.32 million tonnes during 2007–08.
- 27 February – Three teachers in Jalaun district in UP sent to jail under the Scheduled Caste and Scheduled Tribe (Prevention of Atrocities) Act, 1989. They were found to be discriminating against the dalit children by making SC students have their mid-day meal separately.
- 29 February - Finance Minister P. Chidambaram announces Agricultural Debt Waiver and Debt Relief Scheme for farmers.

=== March - May ===
- 3 March – Central government launches Dhan Laxmi scheme in seven states. Under this scheme an insurance cover of ₹ 100,000 would be provided for the girl child at her birth. The scheme aims to improve the girl-child ratio.
- 5 March – S. M. Krishna resigns from his post of Maharashtra Governor.
- 9 March – J. P. Chalasani is appointed the new chief executive of the Reliance Power, an Anil Dhirubhai Ambani Group company.
- 10 March –
  - D. D. Lapang sworn in as the Chief Minister of a new Congress-led government in Meghalaya.
  - Nearly 100 Bharatiya Janata Party and Rashtriya Swayamsevak Sangh workers attack the Communist Party of India (Marxist) headquarters at New Delhi.
- 14 March – Hyderabad International Airport is inaugurated.
- 18 March – Donkupar Roy of the Meghalaya Progressive Alliance (MPA) sworn in as the Chief Minister of Meghalaya.
- 23 March –
  - India test fires nuclear-capable surface-to-surface missile Agni-I having a range of 700 to 900 km.
  - Rajiv Gandhi International Airport opened heralding shifting of Hyderabad airport from Begumpet Airport.
- 24 March – The Sixth Pay Commission recommends increase in the salaries of all government employees by 40%.
- 25 March – Former Haryana Chief Minister Bhajan Lal disqualified from the Haryana Vidhan Sabha under the anti-defection law.
- 26 March –
  - Raghu Menon is new chairman-cum-Managing Director of the Air India and National Aviation Company India Ltd (NACIL) (now Air India).
  - Tata Motors buys two British automobile manufacturing companies, Jaguar and Land Rover, from Ford, their American owners.
- 27 March – Communist Party of India (CPI) re-elects A. B. Bardhan as the general secretary for the fourth consecutive term.
- 3 April – Communist Party of India (Marxist) elects Prakash Karat as its general secretary for another term.
- 28 April –
  - Iranian President Mahmoud Ahmadinejad arrives in India.
  - India sets a world record by sending 10 satellites into orbit in a single launch.
- 30 April – Polar Satellite Launch Vehicle (PSLV-C9) successfully puts all the 10 satellites into orbit.
- 5 May – President Pratibha Patil presents Padma Vibhushan awards to Pranab Mukherjee, Sachin Tendulkar and Asha Bhosle.
- 7 May - Neeraj Grover murder took place.
- 8 May – Jerome Bonnafont, the French Ambassador to India, puts forward the proposal of a large scale nuclear cooperation between India and France.
- 13 May – Bomb blasts rock Jaipur. About 80 people killed in serial blasts.
- 18 May – The bruised body of social activist and member of NGO Vikas Sahyog Kendra, Lalit Kumar Mehta found in Kandra forest in Palamau in Jharkhand. Mehta was involved in social audit of NREGS and is suspected to have been killed by those having "vested interests."
- 20 May – Calling Chhattisgarh government's Salwa Judum vigilante campaign against naxalism as "an abdication of the state itself", an experts group of the Planning Commission called for its immediate scrapping.
- 21 May – Railway Minister Lalu Prasad Yadav announces cash awards amounting to ₹ 174 million for officers and staff of all zonal railways.
- 22 May – Following resounding victory of the Trinamool Congress in the panchayat elections in Nandigram area, violence erupts in Purbo Medinipur district. In clashes between workers of Trinamool and the Communist Party of India (Marxist) five persons were injured.
- 23 May –
  - President Pratibha Patil starts her maiden visit to Jammu and Kashmir.
  - A week ahead of first anniversary of police firing on agitating Gujjars violence erupts in Rajasthan. Four Gujjar protesters and one policeman killed in clashes in Bharatpur district. The tally goes up to 17 later.
  - Prithvi II, a nuclear-capable, 350-km range surface-to-surface ballistic missile, is successfully test-fired.
  - The Union Environment and Forests Ministry has decided to create four new tiger reserves at (1) the Sunabeda Tiger Reserve in Odisha, (2) the Sahyadri Tiger Reserve in Maharashtra, (3) the Pilibhit Tiger Reserve in Uttar Pradesh and (4) the Ratapani Tiger Reserve in Madhya Pradesh. Besides, Nagarahole National Park in Karnataka to be upgraded as a separate reserve.
- 24 May –
  - Eighteen killed and 38 others injured in police firing in Dausa district of Rajasthan in the ongoing Gujjar-police clashes.
  - Bangalore International Airport is completed and operations move out from HAL Airport.
- 25 May – The Bharatiya Janata Party comes to power in Karnataka. In the assembly elections held earlier in the week, BJP win 110 seats. Congress is second with 80.

=== June - December ===
- 4 June – The Government announces an increase in petrol, diesel and LPG prices by ₹ 5, ₹ 3 and ₹ 50 respectively.
- 10 June – Haveri police shooting: The Karnataka State Police open fire on protesting farmers in Haveri, causing two deaths
- 27 June – First Field Marshal of Indian Army Sam Manekshaw died.
- 22 July – The United Progressive Alliance led government in India survives a crucial no-confidence vote based on disagreements between Indian National Congress and Left Front over the Indo-US nuclear deal.
- 25 July – 2008 Bangalore serial blasts: A series of seven bomb blasts rock Bangalore, kills 2 and injuring 20 and on the next day, a number of bomb blasts in Ahmedabad, Gujarat, India, kills 45 and injures over 160 people.
- 28 July – Taarak Mehta Ka Ooltah Chashmah family serial aired on SAB TV.
- 3 August – 2008 Naina Devi temple stampede: Stampede at a Hindu temple at Naina Devi in Bilaspur, Himachal Pradesh, kills 162 and injures 400.
- 14 September - Attacks on Christians in Dakshin Kannada, Karnataka.
- 24 September - Rahul Gandhi elected as general secretary of All India Congress Committee.
- 12 October – Pope Benedict XVI announces the canonization of Sister Alphonsa Muttathupadathu, the first woman of Indian origin to be canonized as a saint by the Roman Catholic Church, and the first canonized saint of the Syro-Malabar Catholic Church.
- 22 October Launched Chandrayaan-1 from Satish Dhawan Space Centre, Sriharikota, Andhra Pradesh at 06:22 IST (00:52 UTC). The vehicle was successfully inserted into lunar orbit on 8 November 2008.
- 26–29 November – 2008 Mumbai attacks: 175 people were killed and over 308 wounded in more than ten coordinated shooting and bombing attacks across Mumbai, India's largest city, carried out by Islamic terrorists from Pakistan.
- Mumbai Urban Transport Project is started.
- 29 November - Sheila Dikshit won the Delhi Assembly elections for the third consecutive time.

== Arts and literature ==
- 3 February – Inaugurating the tenth Mumbai International Film Festival (MIFF) for documentary, short and animation films at the National Centre for Performing Arts (NCPA), Mumbai, the Union Minister for Information and Broadcasting, Priya Ranjan Dasmunsi announced that a dedicated channel for short films in the Eleventh Plan is under consideration.
- 14 February – The Government decides to extend visa of exiled Bangladeshi author Taslima Nasreen, for another six months. Her visa was to expire on 17 February.
- 19 February – The K.K. Birla Foundation decides to give the following awards:(1) The Sixteenth Vachaspati Puraskar for 2007 to Swami Rambhadracharya for his work Sribhargavaraghaviyam (Mahakavyam). (2)The 2007 Bihari Puraskar to Hindi poet Yashwant Vyas for his Hindi novel Comrade Godse. (3) The Shankar Puraskar for 2007 to Prof. R.S. Tripathi for his work Baudh Darshan Prasthan.
- 20 February – Bengali poet and novelist Sunil Gangopadhyay elected president of the Sahitya Akademi.
- 8 May – The Delhi high court quashed three criminal proceedings initiated against the artist M. F. Husain for allegedly hurting public sentiments through some of his nude paintings that were perceived as obscene.
- 25 May – Pakistani rock band Junoon performs in Srinagar on the occasion of opening of the Institute of Kashmir Studies at the Kashmir University.
- 15 October – Aravind Adiga, is awarded the 2008 Man Booker Prize for his debut novel, The White Tiger.

== Sport ==
- 18 April – Beginning of the first edition of the IPL.
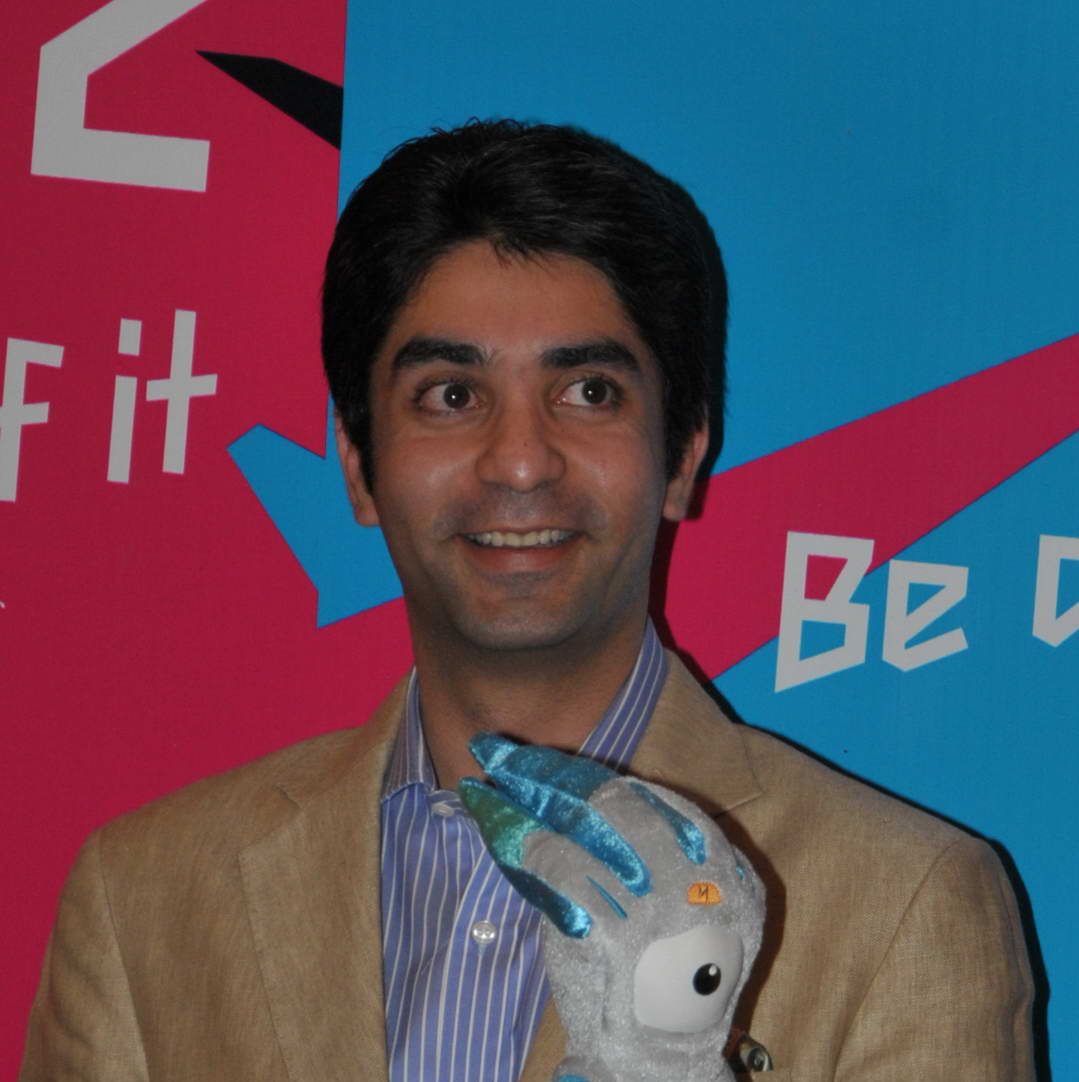
- Abhinav Bindra became the first individual gold-medalist at the Olympics for India.
  11 August – Shooter Abhinav Bindra wins the gold in the 10 m Air Rifle event at the 2008 Summer Olympics in Beijing. He became the first Indian to win an individual gold medal at the Olympic Games.
- 20 August – Wrestler Sushil Kumar wins a bronze medal in the Men's 66 kg Freestyle Wrestling category at 2008 Summer Olympics in Beijing.
- 21 August – Boxer Vijender Kumar became the first Indian boxer to win an Olympic medal when he won bronze medal in the middleweight category at 2008 Summer Olympics in Beijing.
- 7 October – Cricketer Sourav Ganguly announces retirement from Test Cricket.
- 17 October – Cricketer Sachin Tendulkar becomes the leading scorer in Test Cricket and also becomes the first batsman to score 12,000 runs in Test Cricket.
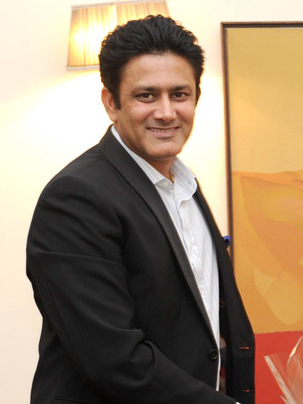
- Anil Kumble retired as the highest wicket-taker for India in Test Cricket. He was third highest worldwide.
  2 November – Cricketer Anil Kumble announces retirement from Test Cricket.

== Deaths ==
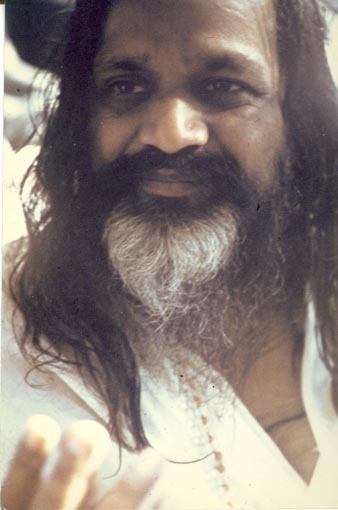
Maharishi Mahesh Yogi

- 1 January – Pratap Chandra Chunder, Minister, educationalist and author (born 1919).
- 29 January – Bharath Gopi, 71, actor, director and producer (born 1937).
- 1 February – Russi Karanjia, journalist and editor (born 1912).
- 5 February – Maharishi Mahesh Yogi, 90, spiritualist, founder of Transcendental Meditation (born 1917).
- 9 February – Baba Amte, 93, social activist (born 1914).
- 25 February – Hans Raj Khanna, 95, Supreme Court Judge (born 1912).
- 27 February – Sujatha, 72, author, short story writer and playwright (born 1935).
- 19 March – Raghuvaran, 49, actor (born 1958).
- 25 March – K. T. Muhammed, playwright (born 1927).
- 19 May – Vijay Tendulkar, 80, playwright, movie and television writer, literary essayist, political journalist and social commentator (born 1928).
- 27 June – Sam Manekshaw, 94, first Field Marshal of the Indian Army (born 1914).
- 29 July – Ishmeet Singh Sodhi, 18, winner Amul STAR Voice of India in 2007 (born 1989).
- 1 August
  - Ashok Mankad, 61, Test cricketer (born 1946).
  - Harkishan Singh Surjeet, 92, former General Secretary of the Communist Party of India (Marxist) (born 1916).
- 19 August – Habib Miyan, unverified supercentenarian (born 1879)
- 29 August – Jayshree Gadkar, actress (born 1942).
- 27 September – Mahendra Kapoor, 74, playback singer (born 1934).
- 26 November – Hemant Karkare, Vijay Salaskar, Ashok Kamte
- 27 November – V. P. Singh, 77, tenth Prime Minister of India (born 1931)
- 28 November – Major Sandeep Unnikrishnan, 31, NSG commando
- 1 December – H. Sridhar, 50, Indian sound engineer
- 10 December – Munawwar Hasan, 44, Indian politician.
- 17 December – Ved Prakash Goyal, 82, Indian politician.
- 27 December – Sahu Mewalal, 82, Indian footballer.
- 29 December – Manjit Bawa, 67, Indian painter.
- 31 December – Premjit Lall, 68, Indian tennis player.

== See also ==
- Bollywood films of 2008
