= 2012 in India =

- Centuries: 19th; 20th; 21st
- Decades: 1990s; 2000s; 2010s; 2020s
- See also: List of years in India; Timeline of Indian history

This is a list of events in India in the year 2012.

== Incumbents ==
Photo	Post	Name
	(India) President	Pratibha Patil (till 25 July)
	(India) President	Pranab Mukherjee (from 25 July)
	(India) Vice President	Mohammad Hamid Ansari
	(India) Prime Minister	Dr. Manmohan Singh
	(India) Chief Justice	S. H. Kapadia (till 28 September)
	(India) Chief Justice	Altamas Kabir (starting 28 September)

=== Governors ===
Post	Name
Andhra Pradesh	E. S. L. Narasimhan
Arunachal Pradesh	Joginder Jaswant Singh
Assam	Janaki Ballabh Patnaik
Bihar	Devanand Konwar
Chhattisgarh	Shekhar Dutt
Goa	Kateekal Sankaranarayanan (until 4 May); Bharat Vir Wanchoo (starting 4 May)
Gujarat	Kamala Beniwal
Haryana	Jagannath Pahadia
Himachal Pradesh	Urmila Singh
Jammu and Kashmir	Narinder Nath Vohra
Jharkhand	Syed Ahmed
Karnataka	Hansraj Bhardwaj
Kerala	M. O. H. Farook (until 26 January); Hansraj Bhardwaj (starting 26 January)
Madhya Pradesh	Ram Naresh Yadav
Maharashtra	Kateekal Sankaranarayanan
Manipur	Gurbachan Jagat
Meghalaya	Ranjit Shekhar Mooshahary
Mizoram	Vakkom Purushothaman
Nagaland	Nikhil Kumar (until 21 March); Ashwani Kumar (starting 21 March)
Odisha	Murlidhar Chandrakant Bhandare (until 9 March); S. C. Jamir (starting 21 March)
Punjab	Shivraj Vishwanath Patil
Rajasthan	Shivraj Patil (until 12 May); Margaret Alva (starting 12 May)
Sikkim	Balmiki Prasad Singh
Tamil Nadu	Konijeti Rosaiah
Tripura	Dnyandeo Yashwantrao Patil (until 21 March); Devanand Konwar (starting 25 March)
Uttar Pradesh	Banwari Lal Joshi
Uttarakhand	Margaret Alva (until 15 May); Aziz Qureshi (starting 15 May)
West Bengal	M.K. Narayanan

== Events ==
- National income - ₹99,440,131 million

=== January - March ===
- 3 January: President inaugurates new SHAR Mission Control Centre.
- 9 January: 10th Pravasi Bharatiya Divas kicks off in Jaipur. Chief guest – Kamla Persad-Bissessar, Prime Minister of Trinidad and Tobago.
- 11 January: 42% of Indian children are malnourished – Hunger and Malnutrition (Hungama) report.
- 13 January: 5 million students perform Surya namaskar in Madhya Pradesh.
- 19 January: Delhi High Court grants bail for Suresh Kalmadi in Commonwealth Games Scam.
- 26 January: Nation displays military might on 63rd Republic Day; Thailand Prime Minister Yingluck Shinawatra, chief guest of India's 63rd Republic Day celebrations.
- 2 February: Supreme Court cancels all 122 licences given by A Raja in 2G spectrum case.
- 5 February: Special CBI court dismisses Subramanian Swamy's petition to prosecute Home Minister P.Chidambaram in 2G spectrum case.
- 8 February: Three Bharatiya Janata Party ministers caught watching objectionable video clip in Karnataka Assembly, Resign.
- 11 February: Army Chief V.K. Singh withdraws petition from Supreme Court in age-controversy.; Advanced Interceptor missile is successfully test-fired.
- 14 February: Blast at an Israeli embassy car in Delhi.
- 16 February: Two fishermen, mistaken for pirates, shot dead off Kerala coast by Italian ship.
- 20 February: Six killed in stampede at Bhavnath temple in Junagadh district, Gujarat.
- 3 March: State Assembly election process comes to an end in Uttar Pradesh and Goa.
- 6 March: Election results for five state assemblies are announced; Samajwadi Party (Uttar Pradesh), Bhartiya Janata Party (Goa), Indian National Congress (Manipur & Uttarakhand), Shiromani Akali Dal-BJP combine (Punjab) emerge winners.
- 14 March: Irom Sharmila fast against AFSPA goes on for 11 years. Indian Rail Budget 2012–13 presented by Rail Minister Dinesh Trivedi.
- 16 March: Union Budget for 2012–13 is presented by Finance Minister Pranab Mukherjee.
- 18 March: Dinesh Trivedi steps down as Railways Minister after pressure from TMC.
- 21 March: Soumitra Chatterjee selected for Dadasaheb Phalke award for 2011.
- 22 March: India votes against Sri Lanka on the resolution to 'credibly investigate' allegations of violations during the war against Liberation Tigers of Tamil Eelam in 2009 in the United Nations Human Rights Council.
- 29 March: India hosts 4th BRICS summit at New Delhi. Heads of state of Brazil, Russia, China and South Africa are hosted by India.

=== April - June ===
- 8 April: Pakistan President Asif Ali Zardari visits India on a personal visit to Ajmer Sharif.
- 11 April: A pair of great earthquakes occur in the Wharton Basin west of Sumatra in Indonesia. The maximum Mercalli intensity of this strike-slip doublet earthquake was VII (Very strong). Ten were killed, twelve were injured, and a non-destructive tsunami was observed on the island of Nias.
- 12 April: 18 get life term for Ode village massacre during 2002 Gujarat riots.
- 17 April: RBI cuts repo rate by 50 basis points for the first time in three years.
- 18 April: Major fire in the signalling system at Kurla brings Central line and Harbour line of Mumbai Suburban Railway to a standstill and two commuters lose their lives after falling off an overcrowded local train. The loss was expected to be ₹170 million (US$1.8 million) to the Central Railway.
- 19 April: India successfully test fires 5000 km range Agni-V ICBM.
- 21 April: Sukma district collector Alex Paul Menon kidnapped by Maoists in Chhattisgarh.
- 24 April: Two NRI kids return to Kolkata after long legal struggle with CWS Norway.
- 26 April: Sachin Tendulkar, Rekha and Anu Aga nominated to Rajya Sabha by the President of India. Abducted BJD MLA Jhina Hikaka released by maoists after 33 days of captivity.
- 1 May: More than 100 feared dead after a ferry capsizes in Brahmaputra river, Assam.
- 3 May: Maoists released the Sukma Collector Alex Paul Menon after 12 days of hostage.
- 7 May: Finance Minister postpones GAAR (General Anti Avoidance Rules) implementation till 2013.
- 8 May: Over 100 Air India pilots go on strike.
- 9 May: Centre government decides to withdraw 2G review petition at the Supreme Court.
- 13 May: Indian parliament celebrates 60th anniversary.
- 15 May: A. Raja, the prime accused in 2G scam, gets bail.
- 23 May: Congress led UPA-II government completes 3 years in office.
- 27 May: Kolkata Knight Riders (KKR) win the fifth edition of the Indian Premier League
- 31 May: Bikram Singh takes over as Indian Army Chief. 11th Indian Telly Awards were held.
- 1 June: Brahmeshwar Singh, chief of banned Ranvir Sena, is killed by unidentified assailants.
- 5 June: Sachin Tendulkar takes oath as member of Rajya Sabha.
- 11 June: VS Sampath takes over as new CEC.
- 15 June:Pranab Mukherjee is UPA candidate for President of India.
- 19 June: India pledges $10 bn to IMF for Eurozone.
- 22 June: Calcutta High Court strikes down Singur Land Act of Mamata Banerjee government.
- 26 June: 26/11 handler Abu Jundal is arrested by Delhi Police.
- 28 June: Surjeet Singh returns home after 30 years in Pakistan jail.
- 30 June: 19 Maoists killed in an encounter in Chhattisgarh.

=== July - September ===
- 4 July: Ashok Chavan named in Adarsh chargesheet.
- 6 July: Disproportionate assets case against Mayawati quashed by Supreme Court.
- 7 July: Popular Time magazine dubs Manmohan Singh as 'underachiever'.
- 12 July: Jagadish Shettar sworn in as new Karnataka Chief Minister.
- 13 July: Panel set up by PM to review GAAR.
- 14 July: Hamid Ansari chosen as UPA nominee for vice-president.
- 20 July: Assam Violence breaks out in Kokrajhar district and adjoining areas.
- 22 July: Pranab Mukherjee is elected as India's 13th president.
- 25 July: Pranab Mukherjee takes over the post of President of India.
- 27 July: London Olympics 2012 from 27 July to 12 Aug.
- 8 August: Incident of violence against North-Eastern people in Pune as repercussion of Assam Violence following which exodus of thousands of North-Eastern people from Bangalore due to a rumour circulated among them through SMS & MMS that they would be attacked after Eid.
- 10 August: Hamid Ansari again elected as consecutively second vice-president of India after Sarvepalli Radhakrishnan.
- 11 August: Violence in Azad Maidan in Mumbai.
- 12 August: London Olympics, This was India's most successful Olympics in terms of total medal tally, having won a total of 6 medals (0 gold, 2 silver and 4 bronze).
- 14 August: Union Minister for Science And Technology and Ex Chief Minister Of Maharashtra Vilasrao Deshmukh dies.
- 17 August: Bulk SMS & MMS banned in India for 15 days to prevent a rumour of ensuing violence against NE people by Muslim fundamentalists.
- 23 August: Government of India increases daily SMS limits from five to twenty per day.
- 19 September: CBI makes first arrests in Assam Violence cases. Mohammed Hashem Ali, Mohammed Adom Ali Sheikh, Mohammed Hashim Ali Rehman, Mohammed Qurban Ali Sheikh, Mohammed Imran Hussain were arrested after detailed questioning by agency sleuths.
- 1st: International Bio-diversity conference held at Hyderabad.

=== October - December ===
- 20 October: A low-cost airlines, Kingfisher Airlines was suspend by all without license operation.
- 21 November: Ajmal Kasab, the lone surviving terrorist of the 2008 Mumbai attacks is executed in Yerawada Central Jail.
- 12 December: The first edition of Kochi-Muziris Biennale began.
- 16 December: 2012 Delhi gang rape and murder - A female physiotherapy student was beaten and gang raped in Delhi, when the victim and a male companion boarded a bus in South Delhi in the evening, after watching a movie. The incident triggered huge outrage and protests across the country and forced the Government of India to react and work on safety for women. Public protests took place in Delhi, where thousands of protesters clashed with police, and other force units.
- 20 December: Narendra Modi (Chief Minister of Gujarat) wins third consecutive assembly election. Virbahdra Singh wins election in Himachal Pradesh.

== Sports ==
=== January ===
- 23 January: Rajasthan defeats Tamil Nadu to win the 78th Ranji Trophy.
- 28 January: India suffer humiliating defeat of 4–0 against Australia in Test Series in Australia.

=== February ===
- 18 February: 2012 Summer Olympics Men's qualification 1 and 2012 Summer Olympics Women's qualification 1 kick-off in New Delhi.
- 26 February: Indian Men's Hockey Team qualify for the London Olympics.
- 29 February: The first season of World Series Hockey kick-off.

=== March ===
- 4 March: Women Kabaddi Team wins first edition of World Cup Kabaddi Title.
- 5 March: Mahesh Bhupati and Rohan Bopanna clinched Dubai Doubles Title.
- 10 March: Rahul Dravid retires from international cricket after a spectacular career lasting 16 years.
- 16 March: Sachin Tendulkar scores his 100th International Hundred against Bangladesh in Asia Cup.
- 18 March: Saina Nehwal wins the Swiss Open Grand Prix Gold Trophy.
- 25 March: M.C. Mary Kom and Sarita win Gold Medals in the Asian Women's Boxing Championship.

=== April ===
- 2 April: Final of 2012 World Series Hockey season, Sher-e-Punjab wins by defeating Pune Strykers 5–2.
- 4 April: The Twenty20 cricket league Indian Premier League kicks-off.
- 12 April: Shiva Thapa became the Youngest Indian Boxer to qualify for Olympics.
- 27 April: Wrestler Sushil Kumar defeats Georgia's Otar Tushishvilli 3–0 in the final to qualify for the London Olympic Games.
- 29 April: Aditya Mehta defeats Pankaj Advani to clinch the 28th Asian snooker title.

=== May ===
- 5 May:
  - Deepika Kumari (Archery) wins first World Cup title in individual recurve gold.
  - Indian Women Squash Team wins Asian Squash Championship.
- 8 May: Indian Athletes win Four Gold, One Silver and Four Bronze Medals at Asian Grand Prix.
- 10 May: Viswanathan Anand plays against Boris Gelfand to defend his world chess championship title from 10–31 may.
- 18 May: Mary Kom qualifies for London Olympics.
- 27 May: Kolkata Knight Riders wins 2012 Indian Premier League by defeating two-time champions and host Chennai Super Kings.

=== June ===
- 7 June: Sania Mirza and Mahesh Bhupathi won Mixed Doubles Title of the French Open.
- 10 June: Saina Nehwal wins Thailand Open Grand Prix Gold Title.
- 17 June: Tejaswini Mule won Silver medal at International Junior Shooting Championship.
- 17 June: Saina Nehwal beats China's Xuerui Li to win her Third Indonesian Open Title.
- 21 June: Deepika Kumari becomes World No. 1 archer.

=== July ===
- 9 July: Leander Paes and Elena Vesnina end runners-up at Wimbledon.

=== August ===
- 27 July – 12 August: India at the 2012 Summer Olympics - Indian athletes win 6 Olympic medals.
- 18 August - VVS Laxman announces retirement from International Cricket.

=== October ===
- 28 October: Second Indian Grand Prix at Buddh International Circuit, Greater Noida.

=== November ===
- England cricket team tours India for 4 test matches 5 ODI and 2 T20 matches.

=== December ===
- Sachin Tendulkar announced his retirement from ODIs on 23 December. He played 463 ODIs in all, scoring 18,426 runs, which includes 49 centuries and 96 half centuries.

== Deaths ==
=== January – August ===
- 16 January – Homai Vyarawalla, 98, India's first woman photojournalist (born 1913)
- 19 January – Anthony Gonsalves, 84, Bollywood music composer, music arranger and teacher (born 1927)

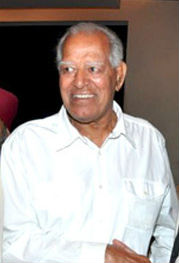
Dara Singh

- 3 February – Raj Kanwar, 50, Bollywood film director, producer (born 1961)
- 7 March – Ravi, 86, music director in Hindi and Malayalam films (born 1926)
- 9 March – Joy Mukherjee, 73, actor and director (born 1939)
- 15 March – Falak, 2, baby murder victim (born 2010)
- 28 March – T. Damodaran, 77, screenwriter in Malayalam cinema (born c. 1935)
- 1 April – N. K. P. Salve, 91, politician, parliamentarian, and a cricket administrator (born 1921)
- 23 April – Navodaya Appachan, 86, film producer, director, and entrepreneur (born 1924)
- 24 April – Sheena Bora, 25, daughter of media executive Indrani Mukerjea (born 1987)
- 14 May – Taruni Sachdev, 14, actress in films and television advertisements (born 1998)
- 12 July – Dara Singh, 83, professional wrestler, actor, director, and politician (born 1928)

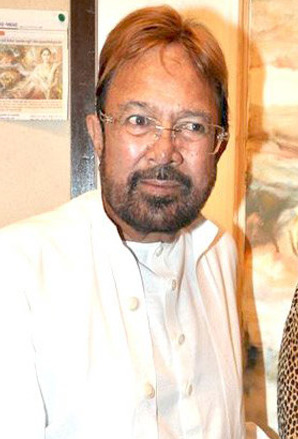
Rajesh Khanna

- 18 July – Rajesh Khanna, 69, actor, film producer, and politician (born 1942)
- 14 August – Vilasrao Deshmukh, 67, politician (born 1945)
- 26 August – A. K. Hangal, 98, freedom fighter, stage and character actor in Hindi films (born 1914)

=== September – December ===
- 9 September – Verghese Kurien, 90, engineer and renowned social entrepreneur, "Father of the White Revolution" (born 1921)

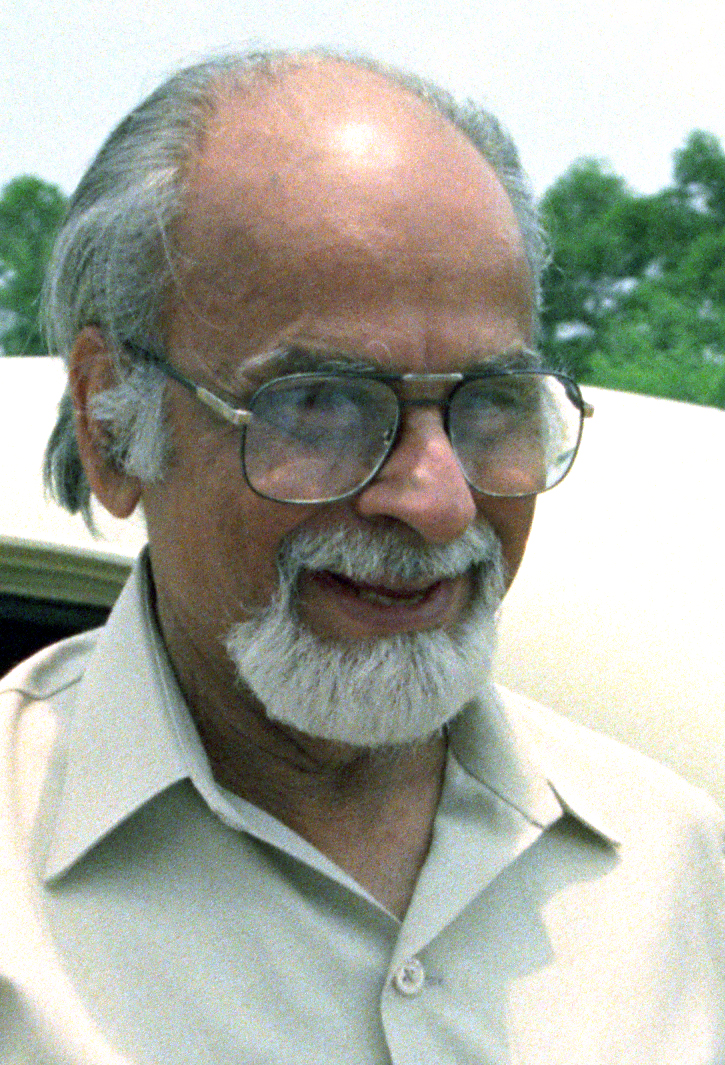
Inder kumar Gujral

- 24 September – Thilakan, 77, Malayalam film and stage actor (born 1935)
- 8 October – Varsha Bhosle, 56, journalist, singer (born 1956)
- 21 October – Yash Chopra, 80, Hindi film producer, director, script writer (born 1932)
- 22 October – Shubha Phutela, 21, model and Tamil film actress (born 1991)
- 23 October – Sunil Gangopadhyay, 78, poet, historian, and novelist (born 1934)
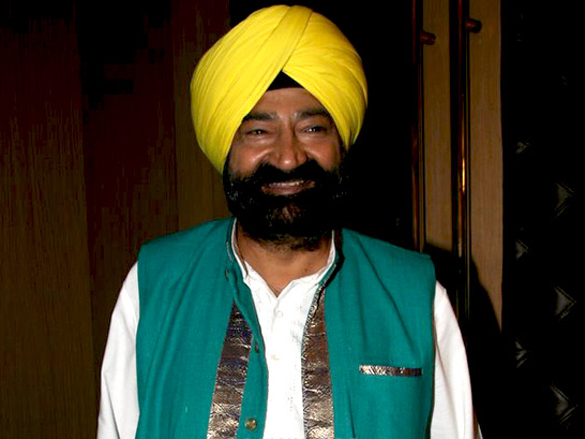
- Jaspal Bhatti
  25 October – Jaspal Bhatti, 57, satirist, television and film director, producer, actor (born 1955)
- 28 October – Savita Halappanavar, 31, nurse in Ireland who suffered a miscarriage at University Hospital Galway (born 1981)
- 15 November – K. C. Pant, 81, former cabinet minister in the Government of India (born 1931)
- 17 November – Bal Thackeray, 86, politician, founder of Shiv Sena (born 1926)
- 30 November – I. K. Gujral, 92, 12th Prime Minister of India (born 1919)
- 11 December – B. B. Nimbalkar, 92, first-class cricketer (born 1919)
- 11 December – Ravi Shankar, 92, sitarist, musician, composer (born 1920)
- 23 December – Anand Abhyankar, 49, Marathi theatre television and film actor, victim of a car accident on Mumbai Pune express highway (born 1963)
- 29 December – unnamed victim of 2012 Delhi gang rape case, female physiotherapy intern

== See also ==
- 2011 in India
- 2010 in India
- 2012 in Indian sports
