= 2009 in India =

- Centuries: 19th; 20th; 21st
- Decades: 1980s; 1990s; 2000s; 2010s; 2020s
- See also: List of years in India; Timeline of Indian history

Events in the year 2009 in the Republic of India.

== Incumbents ==
Photo	Post	Name
	(India) President	Pratibha Patil
	(India) Vice President	Mohammad Hamid Ansari
	(India) Prime Minister	Dr. Manmohan Singh
	(India) Chief Justice	K. G. Balakrishnan

=== Governors ===
Post	Name
Andhra Pradesh	N. D. Tiwari (until 28 December); E. S. L. Narasimhan (starting 28 December)
Arunachal Pradesh	Joginder Jaswant Singh
Assam	Shiv Charan Mathur (until 25 June); Janaki Ballabh Patnaik (26 June-27 July); Syed Sibtey Razi (starting 27 July)
Bihar	R. L. Bhatia (until 28 June); Devanand Konwar (starting 28 June)
Chhattisgarh	E. S. L. Narasimhan
Goa	Shivinder Singh Sidhu
Gujarat	Nawal Kishore Sharma (until 24 July); S. C. Jamir (30 July-30 November); Kamala Beniwal (starting 27 November)
Haryana	Akhlaqur Rahman Kidwai (until 27 July); Jagannath Pahadia (starting 27 July)
Himachal Pradesh	Prabha Rau
Jammu and Kashmir	Narinder Nath Vohra
Jharkhand	Kateekal Sankaranarayanan (until 21 January); M. O. H. Farook (starting 22 January)
Karnataka	Rameshwar Thakur (until 24 June); Hansraj Bhardwaj (starting 24 June)
Kerala	R. S. Gavai (until 7 September); M. O. H. Farook (starting 7 September)
Madhya Pradesh	Balram Jakhar (until 29 June); Rameshwar Thakur (starting 30 June)
Maharashtra	S.C. Jamir
Manipur	Gurbachan Jagat
Meghalaya	Ranjit Shekhar Mooshahary
Mizoram	M. M. Lakhera
Nagaland	K. Sankaranarayanan (until 28 July); Gurbachan Jagat (28 July-14 October); Nikhil Kumar (starting 15 October)
Odisha	Murlidhar Chandrakant Bhandare
Punjab	Sunith Francis Rodrigues (until 22 January); Shivraj Vishwanath Patil (starting 22 January)
Rajasthan	Shilendra Kumar Singh (until 1 December); Prabha Rau (starting 2 December)
Sikkim	Balmiki Prasad Singh
Tamil Nadu	Surjit Singh Barnala
Tripura	Dinesh Nandan Sahay (until 14 October); Kamla Beniwal (15 October-26 November); Dnyandeo Yashwantrao Patil (starting 27 November)
Uttar Pradesh	T. V. Rajeswar (until 27 July); Banwari Lal Joshi (starting 27 July)
Uttarakhand	Banwari Lal Joshi (until 6 August); Margaret Alva (starting 6 August)
West Bengal	Gopalkrishna Gandhi (until 14 December); Devanand Konwar (starting 14 December)

== Events ==
- National income - ₹63,664,065 million

=== January - June ===
- 1 January – National Investigation Agency (NIA) Bill and the Unlawful Activities (Prevention) Amendment (UAPA) Bill, the new anti-terror regime came into force with President Pratibha Patil giving her assent. (The Hindu)
- 1 January – 2009 Guwahati bombings: Five persons, including a boy and a woman, were killed and about 50 injured in serial bomb blasts in Guwahati, Assam.
- 1 January – Indian Government decides to place officers in the rank of lieutenant colonel and their equivalents in the other two services on a higher pay band and constitute a separate pay commission in a move to redress the grievances of Indian Armed Forces personnel over anomalies in pay structures. (The Hindu)
- 2 January – Indian Government in tandem with the Reserve Bank of India (RBI) announces the much-awaited second Stimulus Package aimed at reversing the economic slowdown. (The Hindu)
- 2 January – Kapil Dev, Sunil Gavaskar and Bishan Singh Bedi figure among the 55 players in the ICC's inaugural Hall of Fame list. (The Hindu)
- 4 January – All-India Motor Transport Congress (AIMTC) decided to go ahead with its indefinite strike from midnight of 5 January. (The Hindu)
- 4 January – The Peoples Democratic Party (PDP) formally dissociates itself from the United Progressive Alliance (UPA). (The Hindu)
- 5 January – Indian Government summons Pakistan High Commissioner Shahid Malik to hand over evidence about Pakistan's involvement in the Mumbai terror attacks. (The Hindu)
- 7 January – Satyam Scandal: In a letter to the Satyam board and the market regulator, SEBI, Ramalinga Raju, the founder and CEO of Satyam Computer Services, confessed that he has been creating fake invoices and that the company cash was all fictitious. The BSE crashed 749 points, wiping out about $23bn of investors wealth.(The Times of India)
- 24 January - Mangalore pub attacked by Hindutva group headed by Pramod Muthalik.
- 13 February – 2009 Orissa train derailment: A passenger train derails in Bhubaneswar, Orissa, killing at least 15 people and injuring 150 others.
- 23 February – India approves a £1.7-billion plan to launch its first astronauts into outer space by 2015.
- 25 February – A bus crashes in Indian-administered Kashmir, killing 35 people and injuring 15.
- 25 February – Former Indian Communications Minister Sukh Ram is jailed for three years for corruption.
- 24 March – Sixteen militants and eight Indian Army soldiers are killed in Jammu and Kashmir's Kupwara district.
- 1 April – No additional charges on withdrawing money from an ATM of a different bank.
- April–May – General Elections held.
- 16 April – The Naxalite movement kills 17 people as India's general election begins.
- 20 April – India's Space Research Organization launches its RISAT-2 reconnaissance satellite.
- 19 May – Manmohan Singh of the National Congress is re-elected as Prime Minister of India.
- 21 May – The Communist Party kills 16 police officers near Nagpur, Maharashtra.
- 25 May – Cyclone Aila ravages the east coast killing at least 149 and hundreds others were left homeless as torrential rains led to flooding.
- 3 June – Indian Member of Parliament Meira Kumar becomes the first female Speaker of the House of the People.
- 4 June – Two hundred thousand people attend the funeral of Dera Sach Khand leader Sant Ramanand Dass in Jalandhar, Punjab, India.
- 17 June – Indian Prime Minister Manmohan Singh meets Pakistani President Asif Ali Zardari.
- 20 June – Indian troops enter Lalgarh, a Maoist stronghold in West Bengal, claiming a partial victory.

=== July - December ===
- 2 July – A 148-year-old colonial law banning homosexual intercourse in India is overturned by the High Court in New Delhi.
- 3 July – Three people die and over a dozen are injured in riots after a dead pig is thrown into an under-construction mosque in Mysore, India.

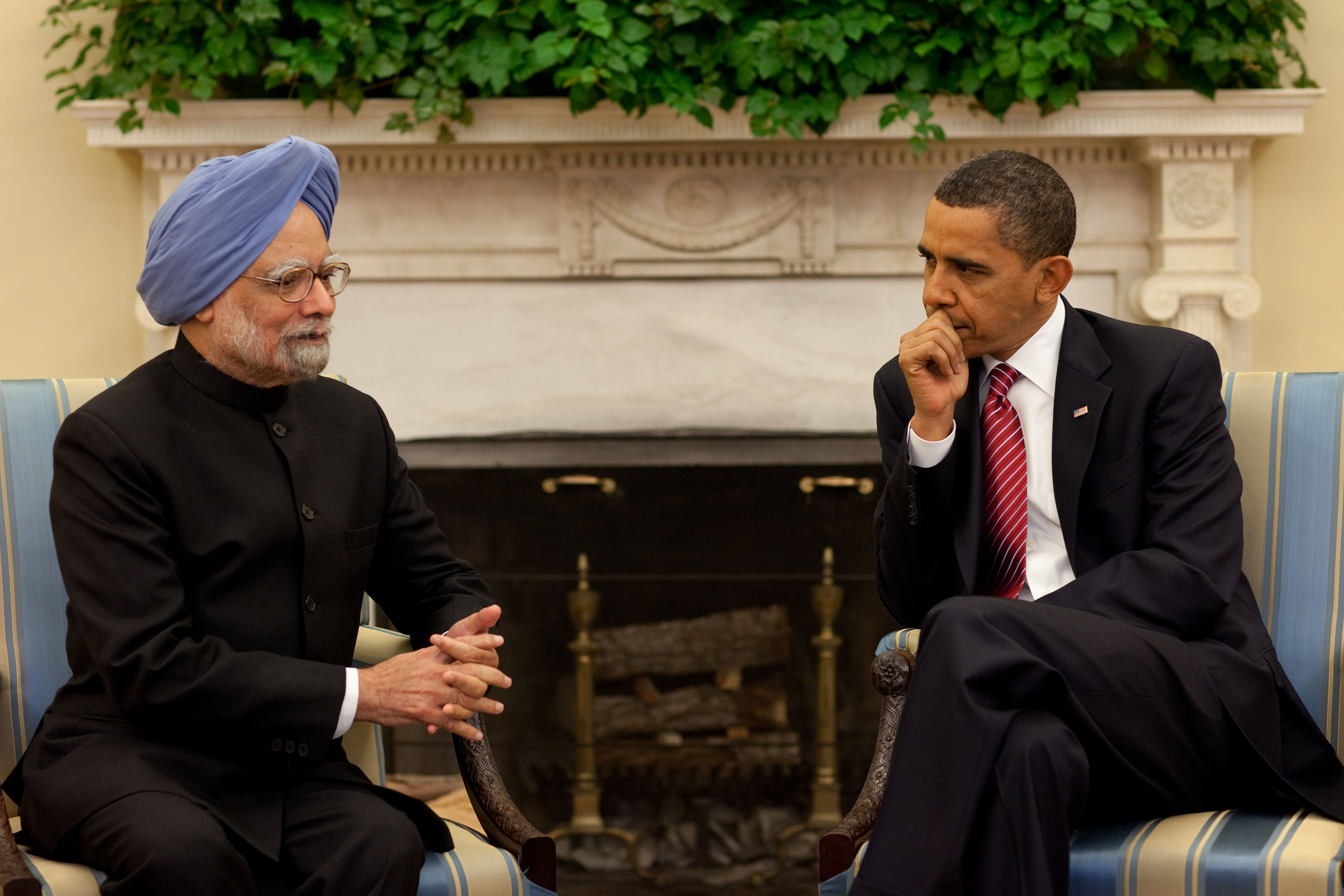
Manmohan Singh with American President Barack Obama at the White House, 24 November 2009

- 5 July – At least eight people die in blasts at two explosives factories in Madhya Pradesh.
- 9 July – The death toll from a mass poisoning involving home-brewed alcohol in Gujarat rises to 71.
- 12 July – Five people are killed and several injured in India after a bridge being constructed for the Delhi Metro collapses.
- 20 July – Ajmal Kasab, the only surviving gunman in the 2008 Mumbai attacks, pleads guilty in an Indian court, ending months of denials.
- 20 July – India and the United States sign a defence pact.
- 26 July – India launches its first nuclear submarine, the INS Arihant.
- 6 August – An Indian court sentences to death three people for carrying out bombings that killed more than 50 people in Mumbai in 2003.
- 11 August – 2009 Andaman Islands earthquake: A 7.5 magnitude earthquake occurs in the Andaman Islands of India. No casualties or injuries were reported, although there were complaints about minor damages to buildings.
- 24 August – At least 200 children are killed and around 900 hospitalised by Japanese encephalitis in Uttar Pradesh.
- 1 September – An outbreak of diarrhoea in Orissa, kills at least 26 people and hospitalises 237.
- 2 September – 2009 Andhra Pradesh helicopter crash: A Bell 430 helicopter crashes during a flight in southern India. Fatalities included Y. S. Rajasekhara Reddy, the Chief Minister of the Indian state of Andhra Pradesh.
- 10 September – At least five girls are killed and 30 other students injured in a stampede at a state-run school in the Indian capital, New Delhi.

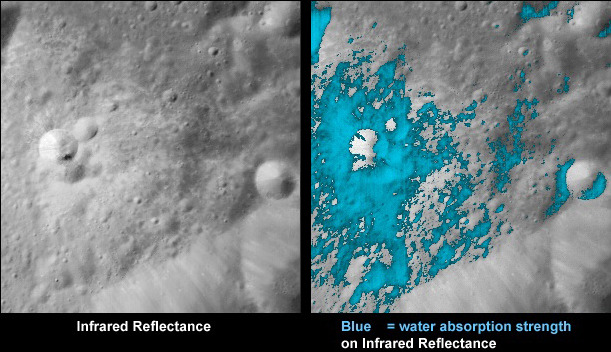
Chandrayaan-1, India's first uncrewed lunar probe, discovers large amounts of water on the Moon.

- 14 September – Chandrayaan-1, India's first uncrewed lunar probe, discovers large amounts of water on the Moon.
- 30 September – 2009 Thekkady boat disaster: the double-decker passenger boat Jalakanyaka capsized in Lake Thekkady, killing a total of 45 passengers.
- 17 October – 32 people are killed in a fire at a fireworks warehouse in southern India, during the Diwali celebrations.
- 19 October – VA Shiva Ayyadurai publishes report alleging CSIR corruption.
- 30 October – Indian Oil Fire in Jaipur: A large fire at an oil depot on the outskirts of Jaipur, Rajasthan, leaving six people dead and around 135 injured.
- 6 November – At least 34 people are killed and 29 are injured when a bus falls into a gorge in Himachal Pradesh.
- 22 November – At least seven people are killed and more than 55 injured in a bombing in Assam, northeastern India.
- 24 November – Prime Minister Manmohan Singh had the first official state visit to the White House during the administration of U.S. President Barack Obama. Several discussions took place during the meeting, including on trade and nuclear power.
- 10 December – India announces it is to create a new state, Telangana, out of Andhra Pradesh.
- 13 December – India successfully test fires its nuclear-capable "Dhanush" missile off the Orissa coast.

== Deaths ==
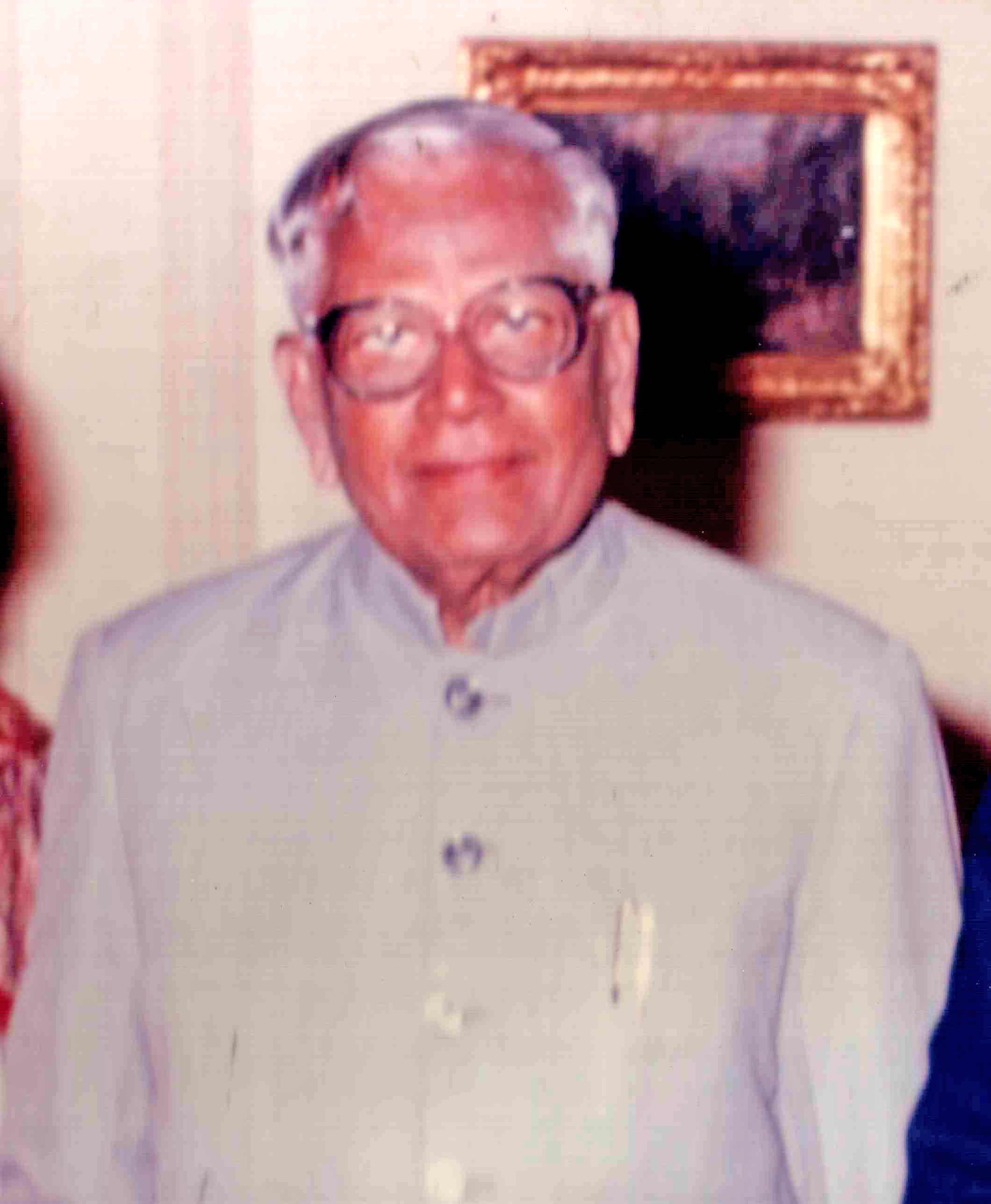
R. Venkataraman

- 15 January – Tapan Sinha, 84, film director (born 1924)
- 27 January – R. Venkataraman, 98, the 8th President of India (born 1910)
- 31 January – Nagesh, actor (born 1933)
- 9 April – Shakti Samanta, 83, film director and producer (born 1926)
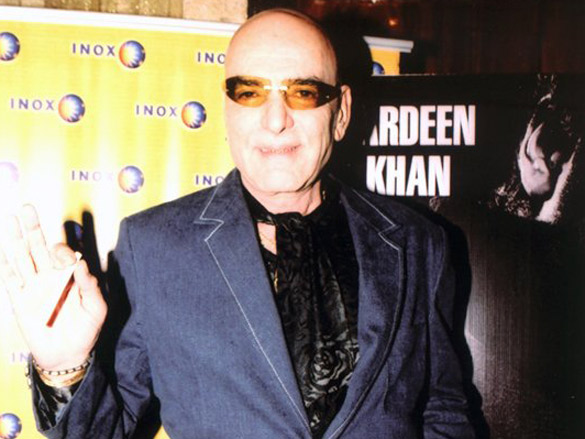
- Feroz Khan
  27 April – Feroz Khan, 69, film actor and producer (born 1939)
- 17 May – Prakash Mehra, 69, film director and producer (born 1939)
- 31 May – Kamala Das, 75, writer and poet (born 1934)
- 8 June – Habib Tanvir, 85, dramatist and actor (born 1923)
- 28 June – A. K. Lohithadas, 54, filmmaker in Malayalam cinema (born 1955)
- 16 July – D. K. Pattammal, 90, Carnatic musician, one of the "female trinity of Carnatic Music" (born 1919)
- 21 July – Gangubai Hangal, 96, Hindustani classical singer (born 1913)
- 28 July – Leela Naidu, 69, film actress (born 1940)
- 29 July –
  - Rajan P. Dev, 56, film actor in South Indian films (born 1953)
  - Gayatri Devi, 90, Rajmata of Jaipur (born 1919)
- 9 August –
  - Gulshan Bawra, 72, songwriter (born 1937)
  - Murali, 55, film and theatre actor, author (born 1954)
- 2 September – Y. S. Rajasekhara Reddy, 60, 14th Chief Minister of Andhra Pradesh (born 1949)
- 25 October – Adoor Bhavani, 82, film actress (born 1927)
- 10 November – Simple Kapadia, 51, film costume designer and actress (born 1958)
- 7 December – Bina Rai, 73, film actress (born 1936)
- 29 December – C. Aswath, 72, Kannada music director and singer (born 1938)

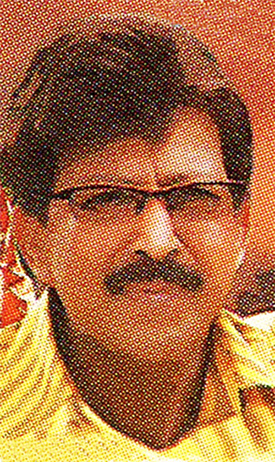
Vishnuvardhan

- 30 December – Vishnuvardhan, 59, Kannada film actor and singer (born 1950)

== See also ==
- Bollywood films of 2009
