= Raipur Central Jail =

Jail in Chhattisgarh

Coordinates: 21.251°N 81.643°E

Raipur Central Jail is one of the 5 central Jails in Chhattisgarh. The total capacity of this jail is 1,100 people. However, it is reported that at any given time, there are more than double inmates than the capacity of the jail. Many inmates of this jail were granted bail during the COVID-19 pandemic.

Raipur Central Jail was constructed in 1873, during the British Raj, and held several freedom fighters. In 2016, on Gandhi Jayanti (02-October), the inmates launched a hungerstrike as Satyagrah, demanding minimum wages, bank accounts and improved living facilities. In 2019, one of the medical officers of Raipur Central Jail was accused of offering preferential treatment to richer inmates and ignoring those who were poor.

== Notable inmates ==
- Binayak Sen
- Soni Sori
