= 2012 in Indian sports =

Between the 2012 Summer Olympics and traditional sports, many significant events occurred this year in Indian sports. Below is a timeline.

== January ==
- M. Chitra wins the women's snooker title at the Manisha National Billiards and Snooker Championship.
- 19–23 January: Rajasthan defeats Tamil Nadu for the 78th Ranji Trophy in cricket.
- 28 January: In tennis, Leander Paes and Radek Štěpánek of the Czech Republic win the men's doubles at the Australian Open.
- 28 January: Australia defeats India 4–0 in the Test Series in Australia.

== February ==
- Ajay Mittal wins the shotgun gold medal at the 55th National Shooting Championships.
- 18 February: The 2012 Summer Olympics Men's qualification 1 and 2012 Summer Olympics Women's qualification 1 begin in New Delhi.
- 26 February: The South African women's field hockey team defeats the Indian women's team, qualifying for the London Olympics.
- 26 February: The Indian men's field hockey team qualify for the London Olympics.
- 29 February: The first season of World Series Hockey begins.

== March ==
- M.C. Mary Kom and Laishram Sarita Devi are gold medalists at the Asian Women's Boxing Championship.
- March 3: Mahesh Bhupati and Rohan Bopanna win the doubles title at the Dubai Tennis Championships.
- 5 March: The 2012 I-League 2nd Division final round in football begins.
- 10 March: Rahul Dravid retires from international cricket after a 16-year career.
- 13 March: In football, India is eliminated from the AFC Challenge Cup after losing three matches in the group stage.
- 16 March: Cricketer Sachin Tendulkar scores his 100th international hundred against Bangladesh in the Asia Cup.

== April ==
- 2 April: Sher-e-Punjab wins the 2012 World Series Hockey final, defeating Pune Strykers 5–2.
- 4 April: The Twenty20 cricket Indian Premier League begins.
- 12 April: Shiva Thapa became the youngest Indian boxer to qualify for the Olympics.
- 16 April: The 2012 I-League U20 begins.
- 17 April: The 2012 I-League 2nd Division final round ends, with ONGC and United Sikkim promoted to the 2012–13 I-League.

== May ==
- 5 May: Archer Deepika Kumari wins her first World Cup individual recurve gold medal in Antalya, Turkey by defeating Korea's Lee Sung Jin in the final.
- 2011–12 I-League football season ends.
- 10 May: Viswanathan Anand defends his world chess championship title against Boris Gelfand from May 10–31.
- 18 May: Mary Kom qualifies for the London Olympics.
- 19 April: 2012 I-League U20 ends, with Pune F.C. U-20 champions.
- 27 May: The 2012 Indian Premier League finals are held at the M.A. Chidambaram Stadium in Chennai. Kolkata Knight Raiders win, defeating two-time champion (and host) Chennai Super Kings.
- 29 May - 2 June: First leg of the Indian Volley League

== June ==
- 4–8 June: Second leg of the Indian Volley League
- 12–16 June: Third leg of the Indian Volley League
- 20–24 June: Fourth leg of the Indian Volley League

== July ==
- July 31: Gagan Narang wins a bronze medal in the men's 10m air rifle at the 2012 Summer Olympics.

== August ==
- July 27 – August 12: India at the 2012 Summer Olympics:
- August 3: Vijay Kumar wins a silver medal in the 25m Men's rapid-fire pistol at the Olympics.
- August 4: Saina Nehwal wins the bronze medal in women's badminton singles at the Olympics, after opponent Wang Xin retired with a knee injury while leading 21–18, 1–0.
- August 8: Mary Kom wins the bronze medal in women's flyweight boxing at the Olympics.
- August 11: Yogeshwar Dutt wins the bronze medal in men's 60 kg freestyle wrestling at the Olympics.
- August 12: Sushil Kumar wins the silver medal in men's 66 kg freestyle wrestling at the Olympics.
- 23–27 August: First test between India and New Zealand of New Zealand's tour of India 2012 at Rajiv Gandhi International Stadium in Hyderabad, India; India won by an innings and 115 runs.

== September ==
- 31 August – 4 September: Second test between India and New Zealand of New Zealand's tour of India at M Chinnaswamy Stadium in Bangalore
- 2 September - India defeats Cameroon for its third consecutive football Nehru Cup.
- 8 September: First T20 between India and New Zealand of New Zealand's tour of India at ACA-VDCA Stadium in Vishakhapatnam
- 11 September: Second T20 between India and New Zealand of New Zealand's tour of India at MA Chidambaram Stadium in Chennai
- 16 September: The India women's national football team win the 2012 SAFF Women's Championship.
- 18 September – 7 October: Indian men's and women's cricket teams at the ICC World Twenty20 in Sri Lanka
- 22 September: First season of the Elite Football League of India begins.

== October ==
- 28 October: Second Indian Grand Prix at Buddh International Circuit, Greater Noida; won by Germany's Sebastian Vettel of Red Bull Racing for the second time.

== November ==
- 15–19 November: First test between India and England of England's tour of India at Sardar Patel Stadium, Ahmedabad
- 23–27 November: Second test between India and England of England's tour of India at Wankhede Stadium, Mumbai

== December ==
- 5–9 December: Third test of England's tour of India at Eden Gardens, Kolkata
- 13–17 December: Fourth test of England's tour of India at Vidarbha Cricket Association Stadium, Nagpur
- 20 December: First T20 of England's tour of India at Subrata Roy Sahara Stadium, Pune
- 22 December: Second T20 of England's tour of India at Wankhede Stadium, Mumbai

== Multi-sport events ==
Event	Medals			Report
Event	Gold medal	Silver medal	Bronze medal	Report
2012 Winter Youth Olympics	0	0	0	Report
2012 Summer Olympics	0	2	4	Report
2012 Summer Paralympics	0	1	0	Report
2012 Asian Beach Games	2	0	1	Report
Total	2	3	5	

== Leagues ==
Game	Tournament	Winner	Length	
Game	Tournament	Winner	From	To
American Football	2012-13 Elite Football League of India	TBA	22 September 2012	18 February 2012
Association Football	2011–12 I-League	Dempo	October 2011	May 2012
Association Football	2012 I-League 2nd Division	Royal Wahingdoh Kalighat; Mohammedan; Vasco; United Sikkim; Aizawl		
Association Football	2012 I-League 2nd Division final round	ONGC United Sikkim	5 March 2012	17 April 2012
Association Football	2012 I-League U20	Pune U-20	16 April 2012	19 May 2012
Association Football	2012–13 I-League	Churchill Brothers	6 October 2012	12 March 2013
Cricket	2011–12 Ranji Trophy	Rajasthan		23 January 2012
Cricket	2012 Indian Premier League	Kolkata Knight Riders	4 April 2012	27 May 2012
Cricket	2012–13 Ranji Trophy	Mumbai		30 January 2013
Field Hockey	2012 World Series Hockey	Sher-e-Punjab	29 February 2012	2 April 2012
Field Hockey	2012-13 World Series Hockey	Cancelled	15 December 2012	20 January 2013
Rugby Union	2012 All India & South Asia Rugby Tournament	Bombay Gymkhana		
Volleyball	Indian Volley League	Cancelled	29 May 2012	24 June 2012

== See also ==
- 2012 in India
- India national football team's in 2012-13
