= Jagdalpur Legal Aid Group =

The Jagdalpur Legal Aid Group, also known as JagLAG, is a non-profit that provides free legal services to adivasis in south Chhattisgarh’s five Naxal-affected districts.

== Establishment and membership ==
In July 2013, Shalini Gera, Isha Khandelwal, Parijata Bharadwaj and Rupesh Kumar moved to Jagdalpur in Bastar District to establish the group. They were joined by Guneet Kaur a few months later and by Devesh Agnihotri in 2016. In mid-2015 Guneet Kaur, Parijata Bharadwaj and Rupesh Kumar left the group. In mid-2016 Devesh Agnihotri left the group. Nikita Agarwal and Priyanka Shukla joined the group towards the end of 2016. Shalini Gera moved out in September 2017. Priyanka Shukla left the group in August, 2018. The group is presently hosting Shikha Pandey, a David Leebron Human Rights Fellow for a year.

== Work ==
The group began by filing requests for information under the Right to Information Act. They found that jails in Bastar District were severely overcrowded, that most inmates were awaiting trial ('under-trials' rather than convicts), and that when these cases finally reached the courts many ended in acquittals. Since then, JagLAG have focused primarily on providing legal aid to villagers who they believe have been falsely accused in Naxalism-related cases.

The group's most high-profile case is that of Soni Sori, who has been charged, along with her nephew Linga Ram Kodopi, with extortion and unlawful activities for allegedly accepting money from the multinational corporation Essar, in return from protecting the company's operations in the state from the Maoist groups.

== Disbarment and eviction ==
On 6 October 2015, the Bastar Bar Association passed a resolution prohibiting any lawyer who is not registered with the local Bar Council from practising in the Jagdalpur courts. The resolution prevented JagLAG lawyers Shalini Gera and Isha Khandelwal, both registered with the Delhi State Bar Council, from representing clients in Jagdalpur. Under Section 30 of the Advocates Act of India, a local bar association has no authority to prevent a lawyer from practicing in any court in the country. Gera and Khandelwal have responded by transferring their registration from the Delhi State Bar Council to the State Bar Council of Chattisgargh.

In February 2016, the Bastar District Bar Association passed a resolution that any local lawyer who co-signed a memo of appearance with JagLAG would have to sever ties within ten days or be debarred. In the same month, JagLAG's landlord was called to the City Kotwali Police station and pressured to evict his tenants. Gera and Khandelwal were forced to relocate to Bhilaspur.
