= Bade Bedma =

Village in Chhattisgarh, India

Bade bedma is a village situated in Katekalyan tehsil and located in Dantewada district of Chhattisgarh, India.

As per the 2011 Census of India, the Bade Bedma village has a population of 1755 of which 779 are males while 976 are females.
