= 2012–13 World Series Hockey =

World Series Hockey 2012-13
Tournament details
- Dates: 15 December – 20 January
- Administrator(s): Indian Hockey Federation
- Format(s): Double Round-robin and Knock-out
- Host(s): India
- Venue(s): 8
- Teams: 8

2012–13 World Series Hockey was supposed to become the second season of the hockey tournament World Series Hockey, a professional league for field hockey in India. The tournament was scheduled to take place from 15 December 2012 to 20 January 2013.

== See also ==
- 2012 World Series Hockey
