= Yashwant Sonawane =

Indian civil servant, burned alive

- यशवंत सोनवणे
- Died: 25 January 2011; Manmad, India
- Cause of death: Assassination
- Occupation: Additional District Collector
- Employer: Govt. of Maharashtra

Yashwant Sonawane (died 25 January 2011) was the Additional District Collector of Malegaon (Maharashtra). He was allegedly burnt alive by an oil adulteration mafia at Manmad near Nashik. Later, CBI investigations revealed that he was killed due to past enmity and that Sonawane had demanded bribes from the same mafia.

== Murder ==
Sonawane had received some information about oil adulteration a week before his death from his sources. While going to Nandgaon for a tehsildar meeting he spotted a few trucks parked in a very suspicious manner near a road side eatery where the depots of IOC, HPCL and BPCL were located. The area was infamous for smuggling and adulteration of petrol, diesel and kerosene. Sonawane got out of the car and started investigating about the trucks. The local police it appears were not informed about this raid. He was accompanied by his personal assistant and another staff member but had no police cover. Sometime later a man named Popat Shinde, who had a reputation of running an oil, petrol and diesel smuggling racket, along with his men attacked the officer, beat him up and then set him on fire. Shinde was detained by police and was taken to the Malegaon Civil Hospital since he also suffered burn injuries. Sonawane was declared dead on arrival at the hospital.

== Investigation ==
On 26 January 2011, seven persons were arrested for burning to death Yashwant Sonawane and appeared before a local court at Manmad. They were remanded to police custody for two weeks until 8 February.

State Chief Minister Prithviraj Chavan ordered an inquiry into the incident, stating, "The government would not tolerate attacks on the officials and strict action would be taken against those responsible for burning Sonawane. I have ordered an inquiry in the matter."

On 27 January 2011, two days after Sonawane was burnt alive, authorities in Maharashtra carried out raids at nearly 200 places, arresting around 180 people in an attempt to crack down on the oil adulteration mafia.

Oil Minister S. Jaipal Reddy told a news conference in New Delhi on 28 January 2011: "We learnt with shock about the heinous killing of Additional Collector Yashwant Sonawane.... He died a martyr to the cause of anti-adulteration drive." Reddy also said that an improved chemical marker will be doped in kerosene to make its mixing with diesel near impossible.

Meanwhile, Popat Shinde the prime accused, died of a cardiac arrest caused due to sepsis on 31 January 2011 at JJ Hospital in the city. Shinde, who was being treated for burn injuries, died in the afternoon, but no one came forward to claim his body.

A twist in the story came when the CBI started investigations. It was revealed that Yashwant Sonawane was in fact already being investigated on charges of accepting bribes and corruption. The CBI report also indicated that both Sonawane and Shinde had a long-standing mutually beneficial relationship. Things turned sour when Sonawane's demands for bribes increased.

== See also ==
- Mafia Raj
- Licence Raj
