= Habib Miyan =

Unverified claimant of longevity record

- Born: Rahim Khan; 20 May 1878 (allegedly); Rajgarh, Alwar State, British India
- Died: 19 August 2008 (allegedly age 130); Jaipur, Rajasthan, India
- Known for: Longest retirement pensioner

Rahim "Habib Miyan" Khan (died 19 August 2008), of Jaipur, Rajasthan, India, was an Indian man who claimed to have lived to 130 years of age, though this claim is disputed. He holds the Guinness World record for the longest retirement pension. The Limca Book of Records lists him as the oldest man of Jaipur, describing him in its 2005 edition as "over 120 years", but since he had no birth certificate Guinness did not recognise his claim to be the world's oldest person and the Gerontology Research Group accepted Edna Parker to be the world's oldest person at the time, at 115 years old.

Miyan's claimed birth date derives from a family tree listing a Rahim Khan born in 1869. His pension book listed his birth date as 20 May 1878. Miyan said he had been using these documents since he was discharged from the army in 1938 to claim a pension, making him the world's longest-registered old-age pensioner.

In 2004 two unidentified people donated money for Miyan to go to the Hajj, making him purportedly the oldest Hajj pilgrim in history. He was named as the Aab-e-Jaipur, ('Lustre of Jaipur') by the mayor of Jaipur. The Telegraph had reported that Rajasthan State AIDS Control Society of the Government of Rajasthan had selected Miyan as "an icon for a long, healthy life in the era of HIV and AIDS."
