= Assam ferry sinking =

2012 public transport disaster in Dubri, Assam, India

- Date: 30 April 2012
- Location: Brahmaputra River, Dhubri, Assam, India; 25.967305°N 90.050726°E
- Cause: Storm and overcrowding
- Participants: Crew and 305 passengers
- Outcome: Capsized
- Deaths: 108
- Missing: at least 150 (presumed dead)

On 30 April 2012, a ferry carrying about 350 passengers capsized in the Brahmaputra River in the Dhubri district of Assam in Northeast India. The disaster killed at least 108 people.

== Incident ==
According to official, the incident occurred when a packed steamer carrying over 300 passengers was caught in a storm and subsequently capsized. According to BBC News, poor safety standards mean ferry accidents are common on the river but that this is one of the worst disasters in recent memory. The incident occurred at Medortari near the Fakirganj village in the Dhubri district, about 350 km (220 mi) west of Guwahati. The Superintendent of Police, Pradip Saloi, told The Hindu: "The ferry, originating from Dhubri and going towards Medortari (Buraburi), capsized near Fakirganj. We are not sure about the actual number of passengers. We have been told that there were 250–300 passengers. However, there were reports of many swimming to safety." Reuters reported that a police officer had said that the ferry had neither lifeboats nor life jackets and was overloaded with people and goods. Most of the passengers were farmers and farm families from the local area.

A survivor said passengers had begged the skipper to beach the ferry on a sandbar when the storm hit midstream, but he refused. "Then the storm became more intense and the boat split into two parts before sinking," Ali was quoted as saying by Channel 4 News.

According to India's National Disaster Response Force (NDRF), the bodies of 108 victims were recovered by the NDRF personnel and the Border Security Force near Jaleswar. Assam Chief Minister Tarun Gogoi said that the death toll was likely to rise. The dead bodies have been kept at the Dhubri Civil Hospital.

== Response ==
Following the incident, the Indian Army, National Disaster Response Force and the Border Security Force launched rescue efforts. The Government of Assam announced a ₹150,000 compensation for the victims. State Transport Minister Chandan Brahma said,'Besides, ₹50,000 would be given to those boat passengers who sustained serious injuries and all those admitted in hospitals would receive free treatment.' He added, 'Anybody found guilty of any violation of rule would not be spared.' The President of India Pratibha Patil expressed grief over the incident, whereas Prime Minister Manmohan Singh assured the Chief Minister of Assam, Tarun Gogoi, that all help and funds for relief for the families of the victims will be provided while announcing the assistance of ₹200,000 to the next kin of each of the deceased.

The Indian Army sent twelve divers for search operations along with army engineers and soldiers. The Army also provided food to the local people, thousands of whom gathered at the spot to help in the rescue efforts.
