= Ankit Garg =

- Occupations: Police superintendent in Chhattisgarh, India
- Awards: Police Medal for Gallantry (2012)

Ankit Garg is a police superintendent in Chhattisgarh, India. On 9 October 2010, he led a counterinsurgency operation against Naxalites for which he would later be awarded the Police Medal for Gallantry.

== Police Medal for Gallantry ==
On Republic Day 2012, Ankit Garg was awarded the Police Medal for Gallantry for his role the 2010 raid on Maoist supporters. Human rights activists protested against the Union government for presenting this award.

Ankit Garg was also accused of ordering the torture and sexual abuse of Soni Sori while she was in his custody, as a district police superintendent, in October 2011. The Supreme Court of India determined that the sexual abuse had occurred, though no action was taken against either Ankit Garg or his subordinates.
