= Yashwant Vyas =

Indian author, journalist, translator and editor

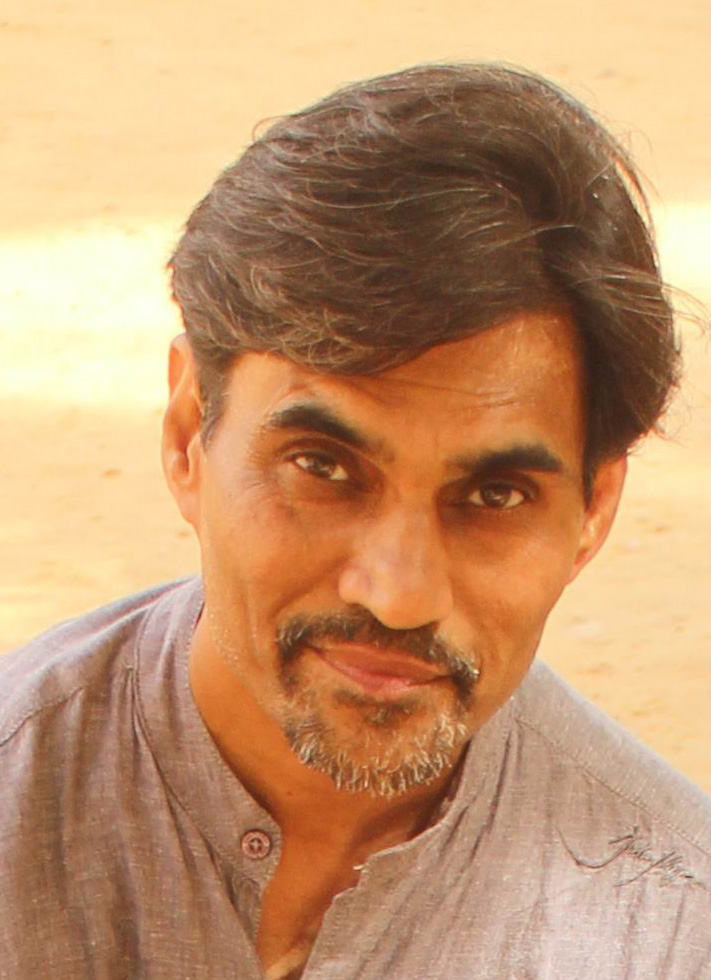
- Born: 1964 (age 61–62); Madhya Pradesh
- Education: Doctorate in Hindi Literature
- Occupations: Author; Journalist
- Notable work: Corporate Jungle ke Hit Updesh, Begampul se Daryaganj: Desi Pulp Ki Dilchasp Dastan, Mohabbat Ki Dukaan, Kavi Ki Manohar Kahaniyan,Chinta Ghar, Comrade Godse, Khwab ke Do Din, Amitabh Ka A, Boskiyana, Apane Gireban Men
- Honours: Sharad Joshi Samman, Bihari Samman, KKB Journalism Fellowship
- Website: yashwantvyas.com yashwantvyas.in

Yashwant Vyas is an Indian author, journalist, translator and editor. He is Group editorial adviser with Amar Ujala newspaper group and founder of Antara Infomedia. He headed an Indian multilingual portal group in the 1990s and has worked for three national newspapers. He has written more than ten books and scripts.

== Career and works ==
Yashwant Vyas started his career as a journalist with Naiduniya, a Hindi newspaper group in 1985. He wrote columns for Naiduniya, Amar Ujala, Dainik Bhaskar, Hans, Jansatta among others. Yari Dushmani, Tathastu, Rasbhang and Namaskar were his columns. He was awarded the KK Birla-HT journalism Fellowship under which his research regarding changing face of regional Hindi press was much appreciated. This research is published by Radhakrishna as Apane Gireban Men. Another work of research was done by him in the form of a book, Kal Ki Taza Khabar, published by Vagdevi.

He joined the Navjyoti Group in Jaipur in 1996 as group adviser. After working with a multilingual news portal company in Delhi for a year, he moved to Dainik Bhaskar Group as an editor. Later, he created Aha Zindagi, first of its own style magazine. Its circulation reached 134,000 print copies and over 500,000 readers. Five years later, he left DB Corp and joined Amar Ujala newspaper group as Group Adviser. He is a co-founder of Antara Infomedia, a collaboration of digital and print.

His first novel Chinta Ghar was published by Rajkamal Prakashan with an introduction by Shrilal Shukla. His second novel, Comrade Godse, discussed media, politics and the murky "art of riots". Both novels won awards, One from Madhya Pradesh Sahitya Parishad and other from the K.K. Birla Foundation. The novels were later published together as Khwab Ke Do Din. Comrade Godse also translated in Gujarati. In Dinon Prem urf Lout Aao Neelkamal and Yaari Dushmani are collection of his columns. His collection of satires AbT ak 56 is published by Bhartiya Jnanpith.

He has written a book on management, Hit Updesh: The Book of Razor Management, an analysis of the Amitabh Bachchan brand titled Amitabh Ka A, and Boskiyana, a conversation with filmmaker Gulzar. A collection of short satirical stories, Kavi Ki Manohar Kahaniyan, was released in January 2021. His collection of satirical stories, Mohabbat Ki Dukaan released in May 2024.

His latest research on Hindi Pulp fiction, Begampul Se Daryaganj : Desi Pulp Ki Dilchasp Dastan
