= Soni Sori =

Indian activist and prisoner

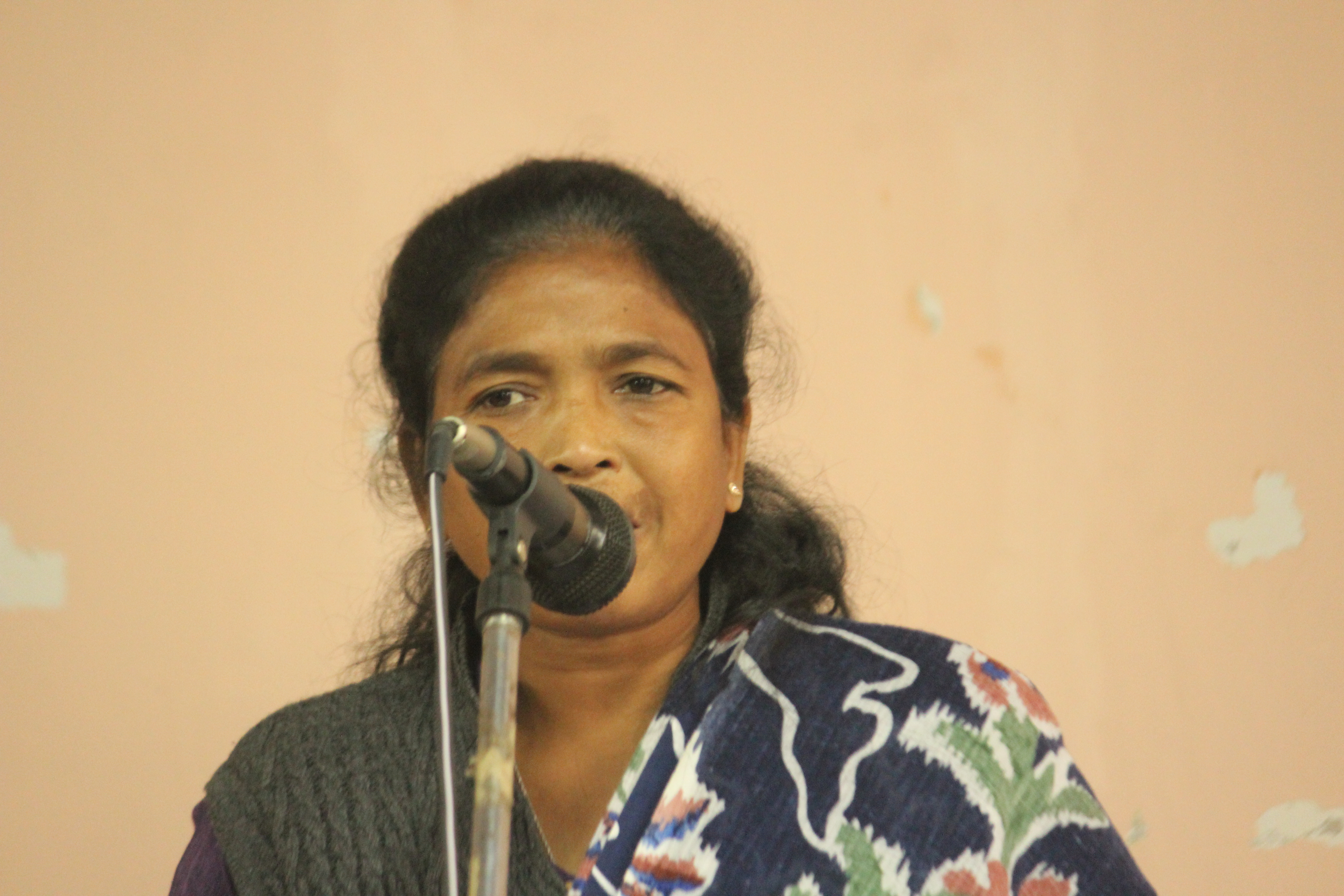
- Sori at Bhopal Jan Utsav 2017
- Born: c. 15 April 1975 (age 51); Bade Bedma, Chhattisgarh, India
- Education: Higher Secondary
- Alma mater: Mata Rukmani Kanya Ashram, Dimra Pal, Jagdalpur
- Occupation: Social Activist
- Known for: Bastar Human Right Activist
- Political party: Aam Aadmi Party
- Spouse: Anil Kumar
- Children: Muskan Sori, Deependra Kumar and Axara Sori
- Parents: Mundra Ram Sori (father); Jogi Sori (mother)
- Relatives: Shadev Sori Ramdev (brother)
- Awards: Front line defender award 2018 regional
- Website: sonisori.wordpress.com

Soni Sori (born c. 1975) is an Adivasi school teacher turned political leader of Aam Aadmi Party in Sameli village of Dantewada in south Bastar, Chhattisgarh, India. She was arrested by the Delhi Police's Crime Branch for Chhattisgarh Police in 2011 on charges of acting as a conduit for Maoists. During her imprisonment, she was tortured and sexually assaulted by Chhattisgarh state police. By April 2013, the Indian Courts had acquitted her in six of the eight cases filed against her due to lack of evidence. After release from prison, Sori began campaigning for the rights of those caught up in the conflict between Maoist insurgents and the government, in particular criticising police violence against tribespeople in the region.

Sori is a member of Aam Aadmi Party on whose ticket she unsuccessfully contested the 2014 general elections from Bastar, but lost to Dinesh Kashyap of the BJP.

In 2018, Sori won the 2018 Front Line Defenders award.

== Early life ==
Soni Sori was born to Munda Ram, a former Indian National Congress leader who served as the sarpanch (elected village headman) of Bade Bedma village for over a decade. Her brother Sukhdev and his wife were also elected to the panchayat (village council) as Congress representatives. Two of her uncles were also Congress leaders, who served as MLAs. Her cousin Amrita Sori is Deputy Superintendent of Police in Jagdalpur, the headquarters of Bastar district.

Sori's family owns large tracts of lands in Dantewada district. In the 2010s, the Naxals forbade her relatives from cultivating their land. Her father served as an informant against the Naxals. On 14 June 2011, the Naxals looted the family's house and shot her father in the leg. He was given Rs. 80,000 as compensation. Sori's mother, a housewife, died in 2012.

Soni Sori attended a nursing college, but dropped out to work as a warden of a girls' residential school in the Jabeli village. She married Anil Futane; the couple lived in Sameli village with their three children before their arrests.

== Criminal charges and prosecution ==
On 14 August 2010, Naxals had appealed to boycott the Independence Day and around 60 Naxals torched six trucks in the Dantewada district and then fled the spot. Along with others, charges were framed against Sori for rioting at Kuakonda police station. On 29 May 2013, she was granted bail by a judicial magistrate.

In July 2010, warrants were first issued against Soni, along with her husband and nephew, for an attack on a local Indian National Congress leader, Avdesh Gautam. In the attack, Gautam escaped harm, but his son was injured. The Indian Express wrote that "evidence suggests both Sori and Futane were not involved in the attack", but that SRP Kalluri used the charges to pressure them to become informers. Gautam stated that Soni Sori was not arrested as she had promised "a major haul of Maoists".

On 9 September 2011, Chhattisgarh Police stated that they had prevented an exchange of extortion money from the Essar Group to the Maoist group CPI (Maoist). Earlier, leaked diplomatic cables had also said that the Essar Group pays a significant amount of protection money to Maoists to safeguard its operations in the state. The cable stated that a senior representative from Essar, a major industrial company with large mining and steel-related facilities in Chhattisgarh, told a representative of the Congenoff (Consul General Office) that the company pays the Maoists "a significant amount" not to harm or interfere with their operations. The police stated the steel company was paying the Maoists to buy peace and safeguard its iron ore slurry pipeline from Dantewada. According to the police, along with her nephew Lingaram Kodopi, Sori was slated to collect ₹ 1.5 million from Essar contractor B K Lala at Palnar weekly market in Dantewada on 9 September. The police stated they arrested Lala and Kodopi from the bazaar, but due to chaos in the market, Sori gave them the slip.

== Arrest and torture while in custody ==
On 10 September 2011, Ankit Garg, SP, Dantewada announced the arrests of Essar contractor B K Lala and Maoist conduit Lingaram Kodapi (Sori's nephew). The police, Garg said, arrested them on 9 September when Lala was handing over ₹ 1.5 million to Kodapi at Palnar market, while Sori and Maoist commanders Vinod and Bhadru "escaped" from the spot. Essar GM DVCS Verma was also arrested. Soni Sori escaped and fled to Delhi. On 3 October 2011, Chhattisgarh Police raided house of Kavita Srivastava, general secretary of People's Union for Civil Liberties, Rajasthan division in search of Sori but failed. It was also alleged that Sori was trying to collect the levy under the pretext of being a Maoist.

Soni Sori was arrested by Delhi Police on 4 October 2011. Deputy Commissioner of Police (Crime Branch), Delhi, Ashok Chand said that they had arrested her on the request of the Chhattisgarh Police. After her arrest, on the same day, she was produced before Saket (Delhi) Sessions Court before a Duty Magistrate and was sent to judicial custody. She was booked under various sections including extortion, criminal conspiracy and unlawful activities. The three accused parties – Soni, Communist Party of India (Maoist) and Essar Group – denied the charges.

On 9 July 2013, Chhattisgarh High Court rejected her bail application along with another accused Lingaram Kodopi after hearing their counsels. The court observed that allegations against them were of serious nature. On 11 November 2013, she was granted an interim bail during the pendency of her bail application as Chhattisgarh Police could not aid the Supreme Court of India with the records at that time. Her bail applications would be heard on merits on 3 December 2013. She has been ordered not to stay in Chhattisgarh and weekly report to Police in Delhi.

Despite Soni Sori's statement to a court that she feared for her safety, she was transferred to the custody of Chhattisgarh state police in Dantewada. She was then interrogated on 8 and 9 October, during which time she alleges that she was stripped naked and tortured with electric shocks. at the orders of then-district police superintendent Ankit Garg. She wrote to her lawyer that she had been forced to stand naked while "(Superintendent of Police) Ankit Garg was watching me, sitting on his chair... While looking at my body, he abused me in filthy language and humiliated me." She alleged that he then sent three men into the room to sexually assault her. Garg "categorically denied" Sori's allegations against him.

Sori was subsequently hospitalized at Kolkata Medical College Hospital, where doctors removed stones that had been inserted into her vagina and rectum. A review by the Indian Express found the medical reports on the issue to be inconsistent, noting that government doctors had not previously noted the stones in their report after an X-ray and that the Kolkata doctors had not noted any tearing or discharge as might be expected. However, an inquiry by India's Supreme Court determined that sexual torture had occurred.

On 8 January 2013, Supreme Court of India allowed Sori's request for shifting from the Raipur Central Jail to the Jagdalpur Jail. Court recorded that she had been shifted to the Raipur Central Jail on her own request. Sori had complained of sexual harassment from jail officials at the Raipur prison. The order was passed after lawyers who appeared for Chhattisgarh government were not opposed to the plea.

== Reactions ==
=== Government ===
The Chhattisgarh government submitted to the Supreme Court of India that the entire allegation was being orchestrated by certain vested interests to malign the Chhattisgarh Police. The police also denied the charges of torture. ADG (Naxal) Ramnivas said that she had slipped in the bathroom and had injured herself. The police said, "in her statement to doctors in Dantewada hospital in the presence of the police, she confirmed that she slipped in the bathroom and sustained head and back injuries".

Gautam, the Indian National Congress leader whose house was attacked in July 2010, said that he felt sorry for her as human rights activists were using her and this had made the case more complex.

=== Activists ===
On 11 October 2011, Sori began a hunger strike to protest her alleged framing in the payoff case. On 13 October, the National Human Rights Commission announced that it would investigate Sori's allegations of torture. In January 2012, Human Rights Watch called on Prime Minister Manmohan Singh to launch an independent probe, criticizing the failure of the Chhattisgarh government to begin an investigation and the lack of inquiries by the national government. Amnesty International stated that it considered Sori a prisoner of conscience, imprisoned for her critique of human rights violations by both Maoist rebels and Indian state forces. On International Women's Day 2012 (8 March), it launched a campaign calling for her unconditional release and an investigation into her torture allegations.

A group of 250 activists and intellectuals wrote to Prime Minister Singh on 30 April expressing concern over Sori's "rapidly deteriorating" condition in prison and demanding that she receive immediate medical attention. Signatories included Aruna Roy, Jean Dreze, Harsh Mander, Prashant Bhushan, Meena Kandasamy, Arundhati Roy, Noam Chomsky, Rinshad Reera and Anand Patwardhan. After being refused by the All India Institute of Medical Sciences the previous day, Sori was later admitted to the hospital on 10 May for treatment. She was found to be suffering from severe blisters in her genital area, and a government inquiry was instituted to learn why the hospital had initially refused her.

However, in an interview, Sori claimed that while she was in jail, no political party and leader came forward to help her.

=== Press ===
Rahul Pandita of OPEN wrote that "there is good reason to believe that the stories in circulation about her are a complex web of lies and falsehood systematically spread over the past two years by the state machinery", and compared the case to George Orwell's novel 1984. The Indian Express wrote of the case that "Sori's story over the past two years is that of a woman who was exploited both by the police and the Maoists—some would say she let them use her—and now by her activist friends."

== Politics ==
After her release from Jail on Bail in 2014, Sori joined Aam Aadmi Party. She said that she wanted to contest elections and transform the system. Party leaders had finalised her name for tribal-dominated Bastar constituency, however later the party made it clear that Sori was not being given a party ticket. It was reported that state leaders of Aam Aadmi Party were reluctant to accept Sori as a candidate. It was thought that charges against her might hurt party's vote in the Chhattisgarh. Finally in their sixth list, AAP announced Sori as their candidate from the Bastar constituency. Agnivesh asked the Naxalites to help Sori win the elections. The north regional committee of the CPI(Maoist)'s Dandakaranya Special Zonal Committee has issued a statement opposing the polls and appealing to people to boycott Sori, while Maoists in Darbha and Katekalyan have asked people to vote for her. She lost the 2014 General election contesting from Bastar, to Dinesh Kashyap of the BJP.

On the election day of 10 April 2014, Election Commission of India had served a notice on her for violation of Model Code of Conduct for displaying her party symbol while voting.

=== 2016 attack ===
In February 2016, she was attacked with a chemical substance by unidentified people in Dantewada district. She suffered from a swollen face and was admitted to the hospital; the doctors were unable to identify the chemical used in the attack. She has also been criticised by the local administration of Chhattisgarh for staging attacks to gain media attention. Areeb Ahmad, a PM Rural Development Fellow in Bastar questioned Sori's claims and alleged that the attack was stage-managed to create controversy before PM's visit to Chhattisgarh. Soni Sori returned to Chhattisgarh on 11 March after undergoing treatment for injuries caused on her face by an acid attack. She said, "My aim in life is to get justice for us tribals".

== Awards ==
On 18 May 2018, Soni Sori won the Front Line Defenders Award for Human Rights Defenders at Risk. She was among five winners who won awards from their regions. Sori won this award for her on-going work towards justice for justice for the Adivasi community in the Bastar region of Chhattisgarh, India. The other winners are Nurcan Baysal (Turkey), the LUCHA movement (Democratic Republic of Congo), La Resistencia Pacífica de la Microregión de Ixquisis (Guatemala), and Hassan Bouras (Algeria).
