= Gurbachan Jagat =

Indian politician

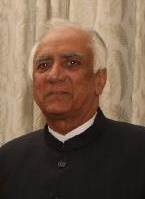

Governor of Manipur
- In office 23 July 2008 – 22 July 2013
- Appointed by: Pratibha Patil
- Chief Minister: Okram Ibobi Singh
- Preceded by: Shivinder Singh Sidhu
- Succeeded by: Ashwani Kumar

Governor of Nagaland
- Additional charge
- In office 28 July 2009 – 14 October 2009
- Preceded by: K. Sankaranarayanan
- Succeeded by: Nikhil Kumar

Chairman of the Union Public Service Commission
- In office 1 April 2006 – 30 June 2007
- Preceded by: S. R. Hashim
- Succeeded by: Subir Dutta

Director-General of Border Security Force
- In office 30 November 2000 – 30 June 2002
- Preceded by: E. N. Rammohan
- Succeeded by: Ajay Raj Sharma

Director-General of Jammu and Kashmir Police
- In office 17 February 1997 – 29 November 2000
- Preceded by: M. N. Sabharwal
- Succeeded by: A. K. Suri

Personal details
- Born: 1 July 1942 (age 84)

Gurbachan Singh Jagat (born 1 July 1942) is a former governor of the State of Manipur in India. He was appointed to this office on 1 July 2007 and retired as the governor on 22 July 2013. Distinguished public servant Gurbachan Jagat has joined as a trustee of The Tribune, Chandigarh on 2 May 2016.

He studied English at university and became a member of the Indian Police Service in 1964 in the Union Territory (AGMUT) Cadre. He served as ACP and Addl DCP in Delhi, SP in Meghalaya during 1971 War, Commandant, BSF, SSP in Goa, Deputy Commissioner (Special Branch) and Joint Commissioner (Headquarters) in Delhi Police, DIG of Chandigarh Police, IG of BSF in Jammu Frontier HQ, IG of BSF in North Bengal Frontier HQ, ADG (Armed) of Jammu and Kashmir and as Director-General of Police in Jammu and Kashmir from February 1997 until December 2000. He was then appointed Director General of the Border Security Force, a post he held until June 2002, at which time he was appointed to the Union Public Service Commission. He served on the UPSC for five years, eighteen months as chair, until being appointed Governor of Manipur.

== See also ==
- Governor (India)
- List of governors of Manipur
- List of current Indian governors
- Manipur
