= Balmiki Prasad Singh =

Former governor of Sikkim, India

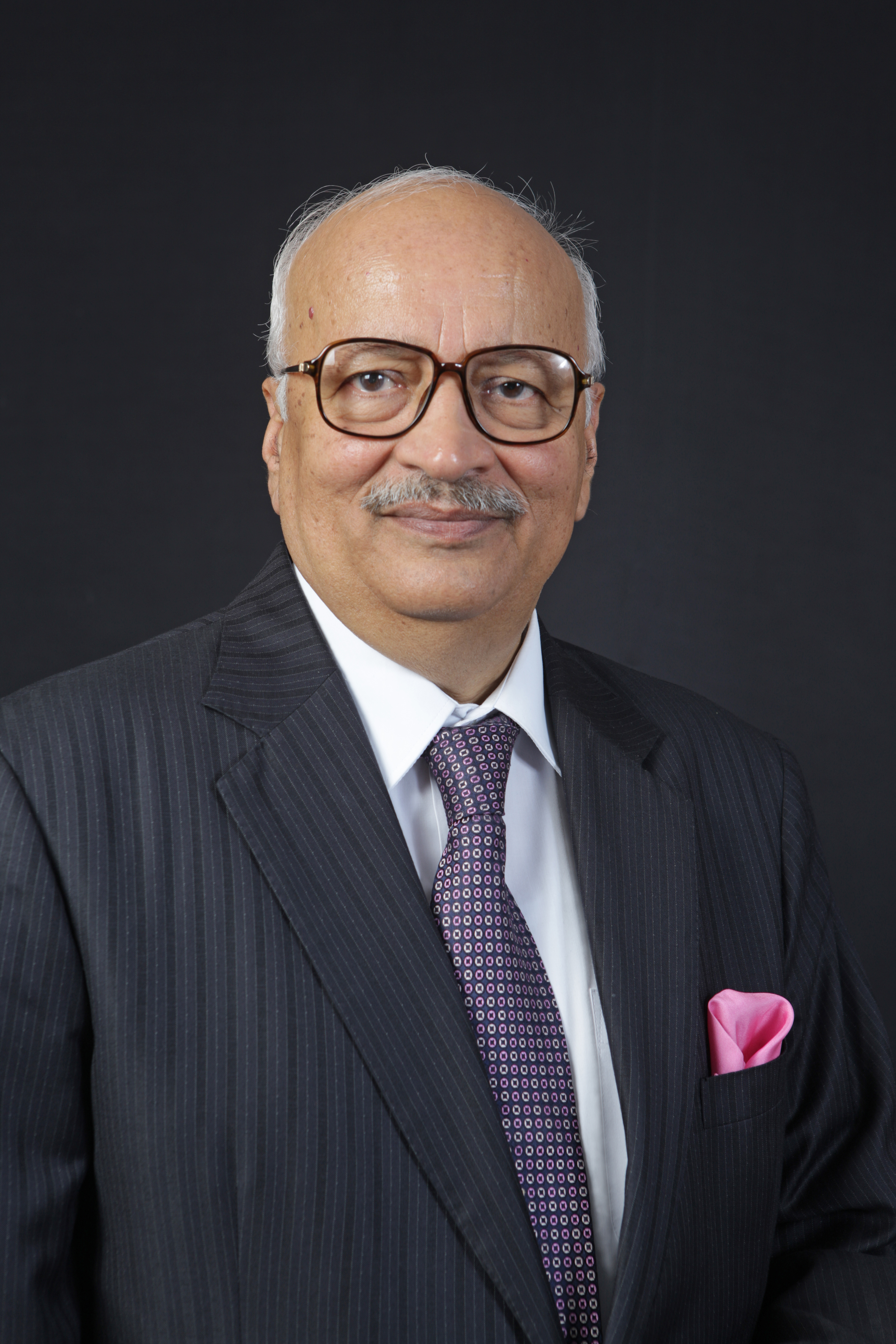

Governor of Sikkim
- In office 9 July 2008 and 27 Apr 2010 – 7 Apr 2010 and 30 June 2013
- Preceded by: Sudarshan Agarwal and M. K. Narayanan
- Succeeded by: M. K. Narayanan and Shriniwas Dadasaheb Patil

Executive Director, The World Bank and its Affiliates representing India, Bangladesh, Bhutan and Sri Lanka.
- In office 1999 - 2002

Health Secretary of India
- In office 1999-99

Home Secretary of India
- In office 1997 - 1999

Cultural Secretary of India
- In office 1995 - 1997

Personal details
- Born: Balmiki Prasad Singh; 1 January 1942 (age 84)
- Spouse: Late Karuna Singh
- As of 28 November, 2014

Balmiki Prasad Singh (born 1 January 1942) was the 14th Governor of Sikkim, India. He is a retired IAS officer and has written books and articles relating to Indian culture, in particular the culture of North-East India. Among his prominent books are Bahudha and the post 9/11 World and The problem of change: a study of North East India.

== Education and family background ==
Singh was born on 1 January 1942 in Begusarai, Bihar. He was educated in a village school and later at the universities of Patna and Oxford. He passed his M.A. in political science from University of Patna in the age of nineteen.

Singh was married to Karuna on 10 March 1961 at Patna while they were in their teens.

== Administrative service ==
Singh was appointed in 1964 to the Indian Administrative Service (IAS).A former IAS officer of Assam-Meghalaya cadre, Singh was posted in North Lakhimpur and Tezpur as a young district officer. He also held the posts of DC, Kamrup from 1973–75 and Home Commissioner, Assam from 1980-82. He had another stint in Assam from 1990-92 before being posted to Union Home Ministry.

Over the past four decades, Shri B.P. Singh has held a variety of important positions within Assam as well as in the Government of India. He was Additional Secretary, Ministry of Environment & Forest (1993–95), Culture Secretary (1995–97) and Home Secretary (1997–99) in Government of India. After an incident involving the extension or resignation of the celebrated Indian Police Service officer Kishore Kunal, he was removed from the post of Home Secretary by the then Prime Minister Atal Bihari Vajpayee who was displeased with his conduct and made the Health Secretary. During this tenure, a conflict again arose between Kunal and him when Singh did not grant regional cancer centre status to the charitable Mahavir Cancer Institute that Kunal had founded. Then Singh was removed again and sent to a World Bank assignment.

B.P. Singh served as Executive Director and Ambassador at the World Bank during 1999-2002 representing India, Bhutan, Bangladesh and Sri Lanka and was one of the founder members of the Development Gateway Foundation (DGF) and member, Global Environment Facility (GEF), Washington D.C.

== Career ==
- 1975-79 Deputy Secretary/Director, Ministry of Defence, Government of India, New Delhi;
- 1980-82 Secretary for all Departments under the Chief Secretary and also Home Secretary, Government of Assam;
- 1982-84 Jawaharlal Nehru Fellow. Was also member, Assam Planning Board during this period;
- 1984-89 Joint Secretary to the Government of India, Ministry of Steel and Mines, New Delhi. Was also Chairman and Managing Director, Hindustan Copper Limited for one year;
- 1989-90 Queen Elizabeth Fellow, Oxford University, U.K;
- 1990-92 Agricultural Production Commissioner and Special Commissioner and Special Secretary, Government of Assam, Agriculture. Panchayat and Rural Development, Fisheries and Animal Husbandry Department, Dispur, Guwahati. Was awarded Governor of Assam Gold Medal in 1991 for outstanding service in Assam;
- 1992-93 Joint Secretary and later Additional Secretary to the Government of India, Ministry of Home Affairs, New Delhi. Devised regional planning and Development models in tribal areas;
- 1993-95 Additional Secretary, Ministry of Environment and Forests, Government of India, New Delhi, Chairman of the National Committee on Bio-diversity Conservation. Asia Representative on Ramar Convention on Wetlands, Gland, Switzerland. Director, Indian School of Forest Management, Bhopal for one year. Life Member of the Society for Promotion of Wasteland Development (SPWD), New Delhi;
- 1995-97 Union Culture Secretary. Became Life Member of the Indian National Trust for Arts and Cultural Heritage (INTACH) organized global level Golden Jubilee celebrations of India's Independence. Set up National Culture Fund;
- 1997-99 Union Home Secretary, Secretary, Justice, Government of India and Secretary, Jammu and Kashmir Affairs, Government of India. Recipient of Gulzarilal Nanda Award for the year 1998 for outstanding public service in India from the President of India;
- 1999-99 Union Health Secretary
- 1999-02 Executive Director, The World Bank and its Affiliates representing India, Bangladesh, Bhutan and Sri Lanka. Founder Member of the Board of Governors of Development Gateway Foundation (DGF) and member, Global Environment Facility (GEF), Washington D.C.;
- 2003-07 A variety of honorary academic and governmental assignments including (i) Chancellor of the Central University of Tibetan Studies, Sarnath (ii) Chief Editor of the South Asia Series on "Perspectives on Economics, Technology and Governance" Oxford University Press, New York. (iii) Chairman, National Commission for Economically Backward Classes set up by Govt. of India: and (iv) Mahatma Gandhi National Fellow; Was honoured the first Man of Letters Award by the Dalai Lama on 11 June 2003 at New Delhi;
- 2008-13 Governor of Sikkim; Also President, Namgyal Institute of Tibetology, Gangtok and Chancellor, Sikkim Manipal University;
- 2014 onwards B.P.Singh worked on a book "The 21st Century:Geo-politics, Democracy and Peace" being published by Routledge (New York & London, during 2017). Also working for promotion of science, culture and world peace.
- Public speaker: have been accepting speaking assignments on subjects such as Peace, Democracy, Culture, Security, Ecology and Governance, within India and abroad.

== Awards and fellowships ==
He has since been the recipient of several awards and fellowships, including the Jawaharlal Nehru Fellowship (1982–84), Queen Elizabeth Fellowship (1989–90) and Mahatma Gandhi National Fellow (2007–08). He is also a recipient of Gulzari lal Nanda Award for Outstanding public service from the President of India in 1998 and Man of Letters Award from the Dalai Lama in 2003.

== As academician and writer ==
B.P. Singh has authored six books including The Problem of Change-A Study of North-East India (1987); India's Culture: The State, the Arts and Beyond (1998) and Bahudha and the post-9/11 World (2008), all published by Oxford University Press, New Delhi. He has also published articles and monographs on politics, culture, ecology and public administration. He is Chief Editor of The Millennium Book on New Delhi, OUP (2001).

B.P. Singh has also been Chancellor of the Central University of Tibetan Studies, Sarnath for six years and Chief Editor of the South Asia Series on "Perspectives on Economics, Technology and Governance" of Oxford University Press, New York (2000–06).

== List of books authored ==
- The Problem of Change: A Study of North-East India, Oxford University Press;
- India's Culture: The State, the Arts and Beyond, Oxford University Press;
- Bahudha and the Post 9/11 World with a foreword by His Holiness the Dalai Lama, Oxford University Press;
- The Indian National Congress and Cultural Renaissance, Allied Publishers, New Delhi;
- Threads Woven: Ideals, Principles and Administration, Allied Publishers, New Delhi;
- Our India, NCERT, New Delhi.

=== Edited books ===
- The Millennium Book on New Delhi, Oxford University Press.

=== Monographs ===
- The Challenge of Good Governance in India: Need for Innovative Approaches: Paper presented at the International Conference of Global Network of Innovators, organized by Ash Institute and JFK School of Govt, Harvard University, March- April, 2008.
- Would Terrorism become a thing of the past: When and How? Journal of Peace Studies, 2009.
- Repositioning A Heritage: Raj Bhavan Gangtok, Information and Public Relations Department, Government of Sikkim, 2011.
- Democracy, Ecology, and Culture-the Indian Experience, Publications Division, Ministry of Information & Broadcasting, Government of India.

== See also ==
- List of Indian writers
