= List of resignations from government =

== 18th century ==
- 1776 – George Clinton, Continental Congressman (July 8), resigned to fight in the American Revolutionary War.
- 1780 – Elbridge Gerry, Continental Congressman (February 19)
- 1793 – Thomas Jefferson, United States Secretary of State (December 31), after becoming disillusioned with the Washington administration.
- 1795 – John Jay, Chief Justice of the United States (June 29), to take office as Governor of New York.
- 1800 – Oliver Ellsworth, Chief Justice of the United States (September 30), after personal unpopularity and illness while negotiating the Convention of 1800

== 19th century ==
- 1817 – Daniel D. Tompkins, Governor of New York (February 24), to become Vice President of the United States after the 1816 presidential election.
- 1829 – Martin Van Buren, Governor of New York (March 12), to become U.S. Secretary of State under President Andrew Jackson.
- 1832 – Robert Y. Hayne, United States Senator (December 13), resigned to become Governor of South Carolina.
- 1832 – John C. Calhoun, Vice President of the United States (December 28), to replace Robert Hayne in the U.S. Senate during the Nullification crisis.
- 1848 – Francis R. Shunk, Governor of Pennsylvania (July 9), after contracting tuberculosis.
- 1849 – Millard Fillmore, New York State Comptroller (February 20), to become Vice President of the United States.
- 1851 – Peter Hardeman Burnett, Governor of California (January 9)
- 1852 – William R. King, United States Senator of Alabama (December 20), to take office as Vice President of the United States.
- 1857 – Hannibal Hamlin, Governor of Maine (February 25)
- 1861 – Hannibal Hamlin, United States Senator of Maine (January 17), to take office as Vice President of the United States.
- 1867 – Rutherford B. Hayes, United States Representative (July 20), to run for Governor of Ohio
- 1873 – Henry Wilson, United States Senator of Massachusetts (March 3), to take office as Vice President of the United States.
- 1877 – Rutherford B. Hayes, Governor of Ohio (March 2), to take office as President of the United States.
- 1880 – James Garfield, United States Representative (November 8), to take office as President of the United States.
- 1885 – Grover Cleveland, Governor of New York (January 6), to take office as President of the United States.
- 1898 – John W. Griggs, Governor of New Jersey (January 31), to accept appointment as U.S. Attorney General under President William McKinley
- 1898 – Theodore Roosevelt, Assistant Secretary of the Navy (May 10), to lead the Rough Riders in the Spanish American War.

== 20th century ==
=== 1901–1960 ===
- 11 July 1902: Lord Salisbury, Prime Minister of the United Kingdom, due to failing health.
- 3 March 1905: Charles W. Fairbanks, United States Senator, to assume office as Vice President of the United States.
- 28 January 1907: Charles Curtis, United States Representative, resigned to become Senator to fill the vacancy caused by the resignation of Joseph R. Burton.
- 6 October 1910: Charles Evans Hughes, Governor of New York, to accept appointment as an Associate Justice of the Supreme Court of the United States.
- 10 March 1912: Sun Yat-sen, Provisional President of China, in favor of Yuan Shikai.
- 1 March 1913: Woodrow Wilson, Governor of New Jersey, to assume office as the President of the United States.
- 9 June 1915: William Jennings Bryan, United States Secretary of State, following handling of the handling of the German submarine sinking of the Lusitania by President Woodrow Wilson.
- 6 December 1916: H. H. Asquith, Prime Minister of the United Kingdom, amidst division in the House of Commons during the First World War.
- 16 May 1919: Walter E. Edge, Governor of New Jersey, following election as United States Senator.
- 26 August 1920: Franklin D. Roosevelt, Assistant Secretary of the Navy, to run as Vice President.
- 13 January 1921: Warren G. Harding, United States Senator, to assume office as the President of the United States.
- 20 May 1923: Bonar Law, Prime Minister of the United Kingdom, due to poor health.
- 3 March 1929: Charles Curtis, United States Senator, to assume office as the Vice President of the United States.
- 3 February 1930: William H. Taft, Chief Justice of the United States, due to poor health.
- 10 May 1940: Neville Chamberlain, Prime Minister of the United Kingdom, amidst division in the House of Commons during the Second World War.
- 3 December 1942: Herbert H. Lehman, Governor of New York, to begin work at the Department of State and the United Nations Relief and Rehabilitation Administration.
- 17 January 1945: Harry S Truman, United States Senator, to assume office as the Vice President of the United States
- 20 September 1946: Henry A. Wallace, United States Secretary of Commerce, after conflicts with President Harry Truman.
- 2 January 1947: Edward Martin, Governor of Pennsylvania, to assume office as a Senator.
- 19 January 1949: Alben W. Barkley, United States Senator, to assume office as the Vice President of the United States the next day.
- 30 November 1950: Richard Nixon, United States Representative, to prepare to assume office as a Senator.
- 1 January 1953: Richard Nixon, United States Senator, to assume office as the Vice President of the United States.
- 5 April 1955: Winston Churchill, Prime Minister of the United Kingdom, due to poor health, but remained in the House of Commons.
- 9 January 1957: Anthony Eden, Prime Minister of the United Kingdom, in the aftermath of the 1956 Suez Crisis.

=== 1961–1970 ===
==== 1960 ====
- 22 December: John F. Kennedy, United States Senator, to become the President of the United States.

==== 1961 ====
- 3 January: Lyndon B. Johnson, United States Senate Majority Leader, to become Vice President of the United States.

==== 1962 ====
- 22 June: Alexander Frick, Prime Minister of Liechtenstein, for health reasons

==== 1963 ====
- 5 June: John Profumo, United Kingdom Secretary of State for War, after misleading the House of Commons in relation to his controversial personal life.
- 18 October: Harold Macmillan, Prime Minister of the United Kingdom, after the Profumo scandal.

==== 1964 ====
- 18 October: Vijaya Lakshmi Pandit, Governor of Maharashtra, to become a member of the Lok Sabha.
- 29 December: Hubert Humphrey, United States Senator, to become Vice President of the United States.

==== 1969 ====
- 29 January: Wally Hickel, Governor of Alaska, to become the United States Secretary of the Interior.
- 28 April: Charles de Gaulle, President of France, following defeat in a constitutional referendum.
- 20 July: V. V. Giri, Acting President of India, to contest the presidential election.
- 14 October: Tage Erlander, Prime Minister of Sweden.

==== 1970 ====
- 22 September: Tunku Abdul Rahman, Prime Minister of Malaysia.

=== 1971–1980 ===
==== 1972 ====
- 5 October: Jens Otto Krag, Prime Minister of Denmark, over disputes regarding a European Community membership referendum.

==== 1973 ====
- 10 October: Spiro Agnew, Vice President of the United States, over allegations of financial irregularities.
- 6 December: Gerald Ford, United States Representative, to accept appointment as the Vice President of the United States.
- 18 December: Nelson Rockefeller, Governor of New York, to allow his deputy Malcolm Wilson to run for governorship.

==== 1974 ====
- 11 April: Golda Meir, Prime Minister of Israel, after becoming unpopular due to the Israeli government's unpreparedness for the Yom Kippur War.
- 7 May: Willy Brandt, Chancellor of West Germany, after the Guillaume affair.
- 9 August: Richard Nixon, President of the United States, after becoming mired in the Watergate scandal and impeachment hearings.
- 9 September: Jerald terHorst, White House Press Secretary, in protest of President Gerald Ford's pardon of Richard Nixon.
- 9 December: Kakuei Tanaka, Prime Minister of Japan, after allegations of corruption and a public inquiry in the National Diet.

==== 1975 ====
- 1 December: Gurdial Singh Dhillon, Speaker of the Lok Sabha of India, to become the Minister of Shipping and Transport of India.

==== 1976 ====
- 15 January: Trygve Bratteli, Prime Minister of Norway.
- 5 April: Harold Wilson, Prime Minister of the United Kingdom, partly due to health problems.
- 11 September: Wee Toon Boon, office holder and Member of Singaporean Parliament, over corruption investigations.
- 22 October: Cearbhall Ó Dálaigh, President of Ireland, after a falling out with the Irish Government.
- 30 December: Walter Mondale, United States Senator, to assume office as Vice President of the United States.

==== 1977 ====
- 8 April: Yitzhak Rabin, Prime Minister of Israel, after allegations of financial improprieties.
- 20 October: Raúl Héctor Castro, Governor of Alaska, to accept nomination as the United States Ambassador to Argentina.

==== 1978 ====
- 15 June: Giovanni Leone, President of Italy, after allegations of corruption about the Lockheed scandal.

=== 1981–1990 ===
==== 1981 ====
- 29 January: Adolfo Suárez, Prime Minister of Spain.

==== 1984 ====
- 30 June: Pierre Trudeau, Prime Minister of Canada, retiring from politics due to unpopularity of the Liberal Party.

==== 1985 ====
- 28 March: Devan Nair, President of Singapore.
- 16 April: Idris Hasan Latif, Governor of Maharashtra, to become the Indian Ambassador to France.

==== 1986 ====
- 7 January: Michael Heseltine, United Kingdom Secretary of State for Defence, over differences with cabinet over the Westland affair.
- 25 February: Ferdinand Marcos, President of the Philippines, actually defeated in elections he tried to rig in his favor triggering protests.

==== 1987 ====
- 24 March: Albert Guðmundsson, Minister of Industry of Iceland, over financial scandal.
- 2 September: Shankar Dayal Sharma, Governor of Maharashtra, to become the Vice President of India.

==== 1988 ====
- 16 March: Musa Hitam, Deputy Prime Minister of Malaysia, over differences with prime minister Mahathir Mohamad over government policy.

==== 1989 ====
- 3 January: Dan Quayle, United States Senator from Indiana, to take office as Vice President of the United States.
- 8 August: David Lange, Prime Minister of New Zealand, over differences with party over "Rogernomics" economic policy.
- 26 October: Nigel Lawson, United Kingdom Chancellor of the Exchequer, over differences with Prime Minister Margaret Thatcher and her refusal to dismiss her Chief Economic Adviser, Alan Walters, who also resigned later the same day.
- 26 October: Alan Walters, Chief Economic Adviser to the Prime Minister of the United Kingdom.
- 1 November: Geoffrey Howe, Deputy Prime Minister of the United Kingdom, over differences with Prime Minister Margaret Thatcher over government policy on the European Monetary System.
- 27 November: Margaret Thatcher, Prime Minister of the United Kingdom, after narrowly failing to win outright in the first round of a leadership contest.
- 28 November: Lee Kuan Yew, Prime Minister of Singapore, but later became Senior Minister until 2011, and remained as Member of Parliament until his death on 2015.

=== 1991–2000 ===
==== 1991 ====
- 7 November: Albert Reynolds, Minister for Finance of Ireland.
- 20 December: Bob Hawke, Prime Minister of Australia, after the loss of leadership spill within the Labor Party.
- 25 December: Mikhail Gorbachev, President of the Soviet Union, completing the dissolution of the Soviet Union effectively losing power in Russia to RSFSR President Boris Yeltsin and failing to keep the Soviet republics from declaring independence.

==== 1992 ====
- 12 December: Bill Clinton, Governor of Arkansas, to assume office as President of the United States.

==== 1993 ====
- 2 January: Al Gore, United States Senator from Tennessee, to assume office as the Vice President of the United States.
- 9 January: Chidambaram Subramaniam, Governor of Maharashtra, after criticizing the style of functioning of Prime Minister P. V. Narasimha Rao.
- 25 June: Brian Mulroney, Prime Minister of Canada, retiring from politics due to the Conservative Party's unpopularity in the federal election after his introduction of the goods and services tax.
- 1 September: Ong Teng Cheong, Deputy Prime Minister of Singapore, to assume office as the President of Singapore.
- 15 October: Ghafar Baba, Deputy Prime Minister of Malaysia, after losing to Anwar Ibrahim in the UMNO's deputy leadership contest.

==== 1994 ====
- 28 April: Morihiro Hosokawa, Prime Minister of Japan
- 30 June: Tsutomu Hata, Prime Minister of Japan
- 12 November: Guðmundur Árni Stefánsson, Minister of Social Affairs of Iceland, following civil servant dismissal.
- 31 December: Joycelyn Elders, Surgeon General of the United States, due to controversial opinions on masturbation and drug legalisation.

==== 1995 ====
- 17 January: Silvio Berlusconi, Prime Minister of Italy.

==== 1996 ====
- 31 May: H. D. Deve Gowda, Chief Minister of Karnataka, to become the Prime Minister of India.
- 11 June: Bob Dole, United States Senator from Kansas, to run in the presidential election as the Republican Party nominee.
- 5 September: Albert Zafy, President of Madagascar, facing impeachment.
- 26 October: Gro Harlem Brundtland, Prime Minister of Norway.
- 21 December: Zhan Videnov, Prime Minister of Bulgaria, amidst the financial crisis.

==== 1997 ====
- 26 March: Julius Chan, Prime Minister of Papua New Guinea, due to the Sandline affair.
- 21 April: H. D. Deve Gowda, Prime Minister of India.
- 19 June: John Major, Leader of the Opposition in the House of Commons and Leader of the Conservative Party.
- 23 July: Sali Berisha, President of Albania, after the collapse of the government's economic pyramid schemes and the 1997 Albanian civil unrest.
- 5 September: Fife Symington, Governor of Arizona, after convictions for bank fraud.
- 8 December: Jim Bolger, Prime Minister of New Zealand, after the loss of leadership spill in the National Party.

==== 1998 ====
- 3 February: Levon Ter-Petrossian, President of Armenia, due to a political crisis over the Nagorno-Karabakh conflict.
- 21 May: Suharto, President of Indonesia, ending three decades of the New Order period.
- 2 September: Anwar Ibrahim, Deputy Prime Minister of Malaysia, due to sodomy trials.
- 25 September: Louis Tobback, Minister of Interior and Civil Service of Belgium, due to a scandal over serial killer Marc Dutroux's escape from prison.
- 21 October: Romano Prodi, Prime Minister of Italy, after loss of support from the Communist Refoundation Party.

==== 1999 ====
- 3 January: Newt Gingrich, Speaker of the United States House of Representatives, after leadership challenge from Dick Gephardt and unpopularity following the impeachment of Bill Clinton.
- 28 March: Raúl Cubas Grau, President of Paraguay, facing impeachment.
- 7 October: Roméo LeBlanc, Governor General of Canada, citing health problems.
- 24 November: Tuariki Delamere, Minister of Immigration of New Zealand.
- 3 December: Choo Wee Khiang, Member of Parliament of Singapore, due to conviction over commercial fraud.
- 31 December: Boris Yeltsin, President of Russia, retiring from politics.

==== 2000 ====
- 22 November: Alberto Fujimori, President of Peru, in a letter sent from Japan; the resignation is not accepted by Congress which instead declares the president "morally unfit" and removes him from office.
- 21 December: George W. Bush, Governor of Texas, to assume office as the President of the United States.

== 21st century ==
=== 2001 ===
- 20 January: Joseph Estrada, President of the Philippines, after he was impeached by the House of Representatives and an aborted trial for his formal removal by the Senate led to a popular uprising.
- 24 January: Peter Mandelson, Secretary of State for Northern Ireland of the United Kingdom, for using his position to influence a passport application for one of the Hinduja brothers, who at the time were under investigation by the Indian government for the Bofors scandal.
- 31 January: Christine Todd Whitman, Governor of New Jersey to assume office as the Administrator of the United States Environmental Protection Agency.
- 7 August: Hugo Banzer, President of Bolivia due to ill health.
- 19 September: Mikhail Saakashvili, Minister of Justice of Georgia in opposition to President Eduard Shevardnadze.
- 5 October: Tom Ridge, Governor of Pennsylvania to become the first United States Secretary of Homeland Security.
- 8 November: Henry McLeish, First Minister of Scotland, over allegations of improper financial dealings.
- 20 December: Fernando de la Rúa, President of Argentina, during riots prompted by an economic crisis.
- 30 December: Adolfo Rodríguez Saá, Interim President of Argentina.

=== 2002 ===
- 15 February: Cassam Uteem, President of Mauritius after declaring his refusal to sign controversial anti-terrorism legislation.
- 18 February: Angidi Chettiar, Vice President of Mauritius and Acting President, after declaring his refusal to sign controversial anti-terrorism legislation.
- 11 April: Hugo Chávez, President of Venezuela, after an opposition march ended with a shootout between government supporters and the Caracas Metropolitan Police, the Llaguno Overpass events, that resulted in 19 dead and 127 injured. The military high command held him responsible for the deaths and demanded his resignation, which he reportedly verbally accepted. However, this is debated.
- 13 April: Pedro Carmona, acting president of Venezuela after the April coup d'état and Chávez' detention. Resigned after the coup failed, after which Chávez was returned to power.
- 9 May: Manohar Joshi, Minister of Heavy Industries and Public Enterprises of India, to become the Speaker of the Lok Sabha.
- 13 July: P. C. Alexander, Governor of Maharashtra, after denial of nomination in the presidential election.

=== 2003 ===
- February: Freddy Matungulu, Minister of Finance of the Democratic Republic of the Congo, on grounds of ethical divergence from the larger government.
- 17 March: Robin Cook, United Kingdom Leader of the House of Commons, over his opposition to the UK's involvement in the invasion of Iraq.
- 12 May: Clare Short, United Kingdom Secretary of State for International Development, because of the Iraq war.
- 24 May: Ajit Singh, Minister of Agriculture of India.
- 29 May: Peter Hollingworth, Governor-General of Australia, in response to an accusation of mishandling a sexual abuse case during his term as Anglican Archbishop of Brisbane.
- 18 June: Anneli Jäätteenmäki, Prime Minister of Finland, due to the Iraq leak.
- 27 June: Christine Todd Whitman, Administrator of the United States Environmental Protection Agency, over her disagreements with the Bush administration on pollution controls.
- 11 August: Charles G. Taylor, President of Liberia, went to exile in Nigeria after being charged for war crimes in the Second Liberian Civil War.
- 17 October: Gonzalo Sánchez de Lozada, President of Bolivia, during massive protests against the government's economic policy.
- 31 October: Mahathir Mohamad, Prime Minister of Malaysia.
- 23 November: Eduard Shevardnadze, President of Georgia following extensive public demonstrations.
- 12 December: Jean Chrétien, Prime Minister of Canada, retiring from politics after the sponsorship scandal.

=== 2004 ===
- 30 April: François Lonseny Fall, Prime Minister of Guinea, who went into exile after his resignation.
- 11 July: George Tenet, Director of US Central Intelligence, officially for 'personal reasons', resigned after criticism of the CIA's approach to intelligence used to support the 2003 Iraq War.
- 20 July: K. Rahman Khan, Minister of State for Chemicals and Fertilizers of India, to become the Deputy Chairman of the Rajya Sabha.
- 12 August: Goh Chok Tong, Prime Minister of Singapore, but remained as Senior Minister until 2011, and as Member of Parliament until 2020.
- 4 November: Sushilkumar Shinde, Chief Minister of Maharashtra, to become the Governor of Andhra Pradesh.
- 15 November: James McGreevey, Governor of New Jersey, after being mired in Pay to Play and extortion scandals.

=== 2005 ===
- 25 February: Faure Gnassingbé, President of Togo, who succeeded his late father as the president, however his appointment was deemed unconstitutional by the international community. Later legitimately elected to presidency on 24 April.
- 8 March: Ramush Haradinaj, Prime Minister of Kosovo, after his indictment by the International Criminal Tribunal for the former Yugoslavia. Later acquitted.
- 10 March: Tung Chee Hwa, Chief Executive of Hong Kong, for health reasons.
- 24 March: Askar Akayev, President of Kyrgyzstan following the Tulip Revolution.
- 9 April: Stanislav Gross, Prime Minister of the Czech Republic, due to corruption allegations over the privatization of Unipetrol.
- 19 April: Omar Karami, Prime Minister of Lebanon, after failing to form a new government.
- 30 April: Ronald Gajraj, Minister of Home Affairs of Guyana, after accusations of overseeing "phantom death squads".
- 31 May: Jean-Pierre Raffarin, Prime Minister of France, after voters rejected the government-supported referendum on the European Constitution.
- 6 June: Abdul-Halim Khaddam, Vice President of Syria.
- 9 June: Carlos Mesa, President of Bolivia.
- 12 September: Michael D. Brown, Director of United States Federal Emergency Management Agency, after heavy criticism of his handling of emergency management operations, in the wake of Hurricane Katrina.
- 11 October: Greg Sorbara, Finance Minister of Ontario after being investigated by the Ontario Securities Commission.
- 2 November: David Blunkett, Secretary of State for Work and Pensions of the United Kingdom, after breaking the Ministerial Code regarding private business appointments.
- 22 December: Zokirjon Almatov, Minister of Interior of Uzbekistan, after the government's crackdown in Andijan.

=== 2006 ===
- 29 January: Sushilkumar Shinde, Governor of Andhra Pradesh, to become the Minister of Power of India.
- 11 February: Prince Lavaka Ata 'Ulukalala (later King Tupou VI), Prime Minister of Tonga, following public demonstrations in favour of reducing royal influence in politics.
- 1 March: Bajram Kosumi, Prime Minister of Kosovo, amid widespread unpopularity.
- 21 March: Laila Freivalds, Minister of Foreign Affairs of Sweden, in response to a number of scandals including her ministry's perceived inadequate response to the 2004 Indian Ocean earthquake.
- 26 April: Snyder Rini, Prime Minister of the Solomon Islands, facing riots after only eight days in office.
- 5 May: Porter Goss, Director of the Central Intelligence Agency.
- 26 May: Dirk Kempthorne, Governor of Idaho, to become the United States Secretary of the Interior.
- 26 June: Mari Alkatiri, Prime Minister of East Timor, during the 2006 East Timorese crisis.
- 3 November: Donald Rumsfeld, United States Secretary of Defense, after the opposition Democratic Party took control of Congress in the 2006 midterm elections.
- 13 November: Opposition members of Lebanon's cabinet, including ministers from the Hezbollah and Amal parties. This led to two years of political crisis and opposition protests surrounding the government buildings.
- 27 November: Michael Chong, Minister of Intergovernmental Affairs and President of the Queen's Privy Council for Canada, in response to the government declaring the Québécois a nation within Canadian Confederation.

=== 2007 ===
- 11 January: Iajuddin Ahmed, President of Bangladesh, in his capacity as chief adviser during the 2006–2007 Bangladeshi political crisis.
- 30 January: Borys Tarasyuk, Minister of Foreign Affairs of Ukraine.
- 4 February: Alex Azar, United States Deputy Secretary of Health and Human Services.
- 12 May: Su Tseng-Chang, Premier, after failing to secure election as his party's candidate for the 2008 presidential election.
- 14 May: Hani al-Qawasmi, Minister of Interior of Palestine, after worsening of the security situation in Gaza.
- 17 May: Paul Wolfowitz, President of the World Bank Group, due to the Shaha Riza scandal.
- 27 June: Tony Blair, Prime Minister of the United Kingdom, stepped down as leader of the Labour Party on (June 27), during his third term.
- 21 July: Bhairon Singh Shekhawat, Vice President of India, following defeat in the presidential election.
- 12 September: Shinzo Abe, Prime Minister of Japan, for health reasons and the Liberal Democratic Party's loss of the House of Councillor election.
- 17 September: Alberto Gonzales, United States Attorney General, due to pressure from Congress.
- 20 September: Mike Johanns, United States Secretary of Agriculture, to run for the Senate.

=== 2008 ===
- 24 January: Peter Hain, United Kingdom Secretary of State for Work and Pensions and Secretary of State for Wales, after the Electoral Commission referred investigations over political funding to the police.
- 24 January: Romano Prodi, Prime Minister of Italy, after losing a motion of no confidence in the Senate.
- 5 March: S. M. Krishna, Governor of Maharashtra, to return to partisan politics.
- 17 March: Eliot Spitzer, Governor of New York, after claims of involvement in a prostitution ring.
- 20 September: Thabo Mbeki, President of South Africa, after illegally interfering in the National Prosecuting Authority.
- 24 September: Yasuo Fukuda, Prime Minister of Japan, citing health and leadership problems.
- 16 November: Barack Obama, United States Senator, after election as the President of the United States.
- 30 November: Shivraj Patil, Minister of Home Affairs of India, following widespread criticism after the Mumbai terrorist attacks, taking moral responsibility for the security lapse that led to the attacks.
- 5 December: Vilasrao Deshmukh, Chief Minister of Maharashtra, taking moral responsibility for the security lapse that led to the Mumbai terrorist attacks.
- 5 December: R. R. Patil, Deputy Chief Minister of Maharashtra, taking moral responsibility for the security lapse that led to the Mumbai terrorist attacks.

=== 2009 ===
- 15 January: Joe Biden, United States Senator, to become the Vice President of the United States.
- 21 January: Janet Napolitano, Governor of Arizona, to become the United States Secretary of Homeland Security.
- 25 January: Björgvin G. Sigurðsson, Minister of Business Affairs of Iceland, taking partial responsibility of the financial crisis.
- 8 February: Otmar Hasler, Prime Minister of Liechtenstein, after defeat in the general election
- 29 March:
  - Anbumani Ramadoss, Minister of Health and Family Welfare of India, after his party withdrew from the ruling coalition.
  - R. Velu, Minister of State for Railways of India, after his party withdrew from the ruling coalition.
- 3 April: Abdullah Ahmad Badawi, Prime Minister of Malaysia.
- 5 April: Anders Fogh Rasmussen, Prime Minister of Denmark, after being confirmed as NATO Secretary General.
- 31 May: Meira Kumar, Minister of Water Resources of India, to become the Speaker of the Lok Sabha.
- 1 July: Ivo Sanader, Prime Minister of Croatia.
- 26 July: Sarah Palin, Governor of Alaska.
- 30 September: Ögmundur Jónasson, Minister of Health of Iceland, in connection with Icesave dispute.

=== 2010 ===
- 11 May: Gordon Brown, Prime Minister of the United Kingdom and Leader of the Labour Party, after defeat in the general election.
- 30 May: David Laws, Chief Secretary to the Treasury of the United Kingdom, over expenses abuse allegations after it emerged he had channeled tens of thousands of pounds in public money to his longtime partner.
- 31 May: Horst Köhler, President of Germany, due to controversial statements on overseas military deployment.
- 8 June: Yukio Hatoyama, Prime Minister of Japan, after breaking a campaign promise to close an American military base on the island of Okinawa.
- 24 June: Kevin Rudd, Prime Minister of Australia and leader of the Australian Labor Party, after the loss of leadership spill.
- 27 September: Fatmir Sejdiu, President of Kosovo, after the Constitutional Court held him for grossly violating the constitution by simultaneously holding the presidency and chairmanship of a political party.
- 11 November: Prithviraj Chavan, Minister of State (Independent Charge) for Science and Technology and Earth Sciences of India, to become the Chief Minister of Maharashtra.
- 15 November: A. Raja, Minister of Communications and Information Technology of India, following corruption charges.

=== 2011 ===
- 14 January: Zine El Abidine Ben Ali, President of Tunisia, following the Tunisian Revolution.
- 11 February: Hosni Mubarak, President of Egypt, following the Egyptian Revolution.
- 19 May: Mamata Banerjee, Minister of Railways of India, to assume office as the Chief Minister of West Bengal.
- 12 July:
  - Dayanidhi Maran, Minister of Textiles of India, ahead of cabinet reshuffle.
  - Murli Deora, Minister of Corporate Affairs of India, ahead of cabinet reshuffle.
  - Bijoy Krishna Handique, Minister of Development of North Eastern Region of India, ahead of cabinet reshuffle.
  - M. S. Gill, Minister of Statistics and Programme Implementation of India, ahead of cabinet reshuffle.
  - Kantilal Bhuria, Minister of Tribal Affairs of India, ahead of cabinet reshuffle.
  - Sai Prathap Annayyagari, Minister of State for Heavy Industries and Public Enterprises of India, ahead of cabinet reshuffle.
  - Arun Subhashchandra Yadav, Minister of State for Agriculture and Food Processing Industries of India, ahead of cabinet reshuffle.
- 13 July: Gurudas Kamat, Minister of State (Independent Charge) of Drinking Water and Sanitation of India, due to disappointment with portfolio allocation.
- 1 August: Gary Locke, United States Secretary of Commerce, to become the United States Ambassador to China.
- 2 September: Naoto Kan, Prime Minister of Japan, following the Fukushima Daiichi nuclear disaster.
- 23 October: Bruce Golding, Prime Minister of Jamaica.
- 10 November: Marcus Stephen, President of Nauru.
- 10 November: George Papandreou, Prime Minister of Greece, due to economic crisis and to form a national unity government.
- 11 November: Silvio Berlusconi, Prime Minister of Italy, after losing absolute majority in the Chamber of Deputies over his handling of the economic crisis.

=== 2012 ===
- 26 January: Uhuru Kenyatta, Minister of Finance of Kenya, after being indicted by the International Criminal Court for crimes against humanity.
- 6 February: Emil Boc, Prime Minister of Romania, due to the 2012 Romanian protests.
- 6 February: Wu Den-yih, Premier of the Republic of China, to assume office as the Vice President of the Republic of China.
- 7 February: Mohamed Nasheed, President of Maldives.
- 17 February: Christian Wulff, President of Germany, facing the prospect of prosecution for allegations of corruption relating to his prior service as Minister-President of Lower Saxony.
- 22 February: Kevin Rudd, Minister of Foreign Affairs of Australia.
- 30 March: Anerood Jugnauth, President of Mauritius, to return to partisan politics.
- 2 April: Pál Schmitt, President of Hungary, following plagiarism scandal.
- 21 June: John Bryson, United States Secretary of Commerce.
- 26 June: Pranab Mukherjee, Minister of Finance of India, to run in the presidential election.
- 27 June: Virbhadra Singh, Minister of Micro, Small and Medium Enterprises of India, in wake of corruption charges being framed upon him.
- 22 September:
  - Mukul Roy, Minister of Railways of India, after the Trinamool Congress' withdrawal from the ruling coalition.
  - Sudip Bandyopadhyay, Minister of State for Health and Family Welfare of India, after the Trinamool Congress' withdrawal from the ruling coalition.
  - Saugata Roy, Minister of State for Urban Development of India, after the Trinamool Congress' withdrawal from the ruling coalition.
  - Choudhury Mohan Jatua, Minister of State for Information and Broadcasting of India, after the Trinamool Congress' withdrawal from the ruling coalition.
  - Sultan Ahmed, Minister of State for Tourism of India, after the Trinamool Congress' withdrawal from the ruling coalition.
  - Sisir Adhikari, Minister of State for Rural Development of India, after the Trinamool Congress' withdrawal from the ruling coalition.
- 27 October:
  - S. M. Krishna, Minister of External Affairs of India, ahead of cabinet reshuffle.
  - Ambika Soni, Minister of Information and Broadcasting of India, ahead of cabinet reshuffle.
  - Mukul Wasnik, Minister of Social Justice and Empowerment of India, ahead of cabinet reshuffle.
  - Subodh Kant Sahay, Minister of Tourism of India, ahead of cabinet reshuffle.
  - Mahadeo Singh Khandela, Minister of State for Tribal Affairs of India, ahead of cabinet reshuffle.
  - Vincent Pala, Minister of State for Water Resources and Minority Affairs of India, ahead of cabinet reshuffle.
  - Agatha Sangma, Minister of State for Rural Development of India, ahead of cabinet reshuffle.
- 9 November: David Petraeus, Director of the United States Central Intelligence Agency, after an extramarital affair reportedly uncovered in an FBI investigation.
- 12 December: Michael Palmer, Speaker of Parliament of Singapore, after an extramarital affair reportedly against a grassroots constituency director from People's Association.

=== 2013 ===
- 9 February: Annette Schavan, Federal Minister of Education and Research of Germany, after her doctorate was revoked for plagiarism.
- 11 February: Benedict XVI, Pope and Sovereign of the Vatican City State, on health and age grounds.
- 14 March: Hamadi Jebali, Prime Minister of Tunisia
- 21 March:
  - M. K. Alagiri, Minister of Chemicals and Fertilizers of India, following Dravida Munnetra Kazhagam's withdrawal from the ruling coalition.
  - S. S. Palanimanickam, Minister of State for Finance of India, following DMK's withdrawal from the ruling coalition.
  - S. Gandhiselvan, Minister of State for Health and Family Welfare of India, following DMK's withdrawal from the ruling coalition.
  - S. Jagathrakshakan, Minister of State for Commerce and Industry of India, following DMK's withdrawal from the ruling coalition.
  - D. Napoleon, Minister of State for Social Justice and Empowerment of India, following DMK's withdrawal from the ruling coalition.
- 28 April: Mario Monti, Prime Minister of Italy.
- 11 May:
  - Pawan Kumar Bansal, Minister of Railways of India, on corruption charges.
  - Ashwani Kumar, Minister of Law and Justice of India, on corruption charges.
- 30 May: Eric Shinseki, United States Secretary of Veterans Affairs, following a scandal over gross mismanagement by the department.
- 16 June:
  - C. P. Joshi, Minister of Road Transport and Highways and Railways of India, ahead of cabinet reshuffle.
  - Ajay Maken, Minister of Housing and Urban Poverty Alleviation of India, ahead of cabinet reshuffle.
- 27 June: Julia Gillard, Prime Minister of Australia and leader of the Australian Labor Party, after the loss of a leadership spill.
- 4 December: Hanna Birna Kristjánsdóttir, Minister of the Interior of Iceland.
- 20 December: Jayanthi Natarajan, Minister of State (Independent Charge) for Environment and Forests of India, to assume party work for upcoming general election.

=== 2014 ===
- 29 January: Selja Kumari, Minister of Social Justice and Empowerment of India, to focus on party work ahead of the general election.
- 2 February: Harish Rawat, Minister of Water Resources of India, to become the Chief Minister of Uttarakhand.
- 22 February: Enrico Letta, Prime Minister of Italy.
- 11 March: Daggubati Purandeswari, Minister of State for Commerce and Industry of India, to join the opposition Bharatiya Janata Party.
- 31 March: Jean-Marc Ayrault, Prime Minister of France, following loss in the municipal elections.
- 3 April: Kavuri Samba Siva Rao, Minister of Textiles of India, to join the opposition Bharatiya Janata Party.
- 24 May: Neiphiu Rio, Chief Minister of Nagaland, following election to the Lok Sabha.
- 26 May: Montek Singh Ahluwalia, Deputy Chairman of the Planning Commission of India, following defeat of the ruling coalition in the general election.
- 26 May: Shivshankar Menon, National Security Advisor of India, following defeat of the ruling coalition in the general election.
- 17 June: Banwari Lal Joshi, Governor of Uttar Pradesh, following defeat of the ruling coalition in the general election.
- 18 June: Shekhar Dutt, Governor of Chhattisgarh, following defeat of the ruling coalition in the general election.
- 27 June: Ashwani Kumar, Governor of Nagaland, following defeat of the ruling coalition in the general election.
- 30 June: M. K. Narayanan, Governor of West Bengal, following questioning by Central Bureau of Investigation as a witness in 2013 helicopter bribery scandal.
- 4 July: Bharat Vir Wanchoo, Governor of Goa, following questioning by Central Bureau of Investigation as a witness in 2013 helicopter bribery scandal.
- 14 July: Vakkom Purushothaman, Governor of Mizoram, refusing to accept assignment and transfer as Governor of Nagaland.
- 22 July: Julian Castro, Mayor of San Antonio, to become the United States Secretary of Housing and Urban Development.
- 24 August: K. Sankaranarayanan, Governor of Maharashtra, refusing to accept assignment and transfer as Governor of Mizoram.
- 30 August: Judith Collins, Minister of Justice of New Zealand, conflict of interest, attempts to undermine public servants, association with right-wing hate blog.
- 3 September: Sheila Dikshit, Governor of Kerala, following change in the central government.
- 11 September: Vinod Kumar Duggal, Governor of Manipur and Mizoram, following change in the central government.
- 27 September: J. Jayalalithaa, Chief Minister of Tamil Nadu, following conviction and sentencing in disproportionate assets case.
- 8 November: Manohar Parrikar, Chief Minister of Goa, following appointment as Minister of Defence.
- 18 November: Alex Salmond, First Minister of Scotland, following the result of the 2014 independence referendum.
- 4 December: Hanna Birna Kristjánsdóttir, Minister of the Interior of Iceland, in response to one of her political assistant admitting leaking information regarding asylum seekers.

=== 2015 ===
- 14 January: Giorgio Napolitano, President of Italy, on grounds of illness and age.
- 17 February: Chuck Hagel, United States Secretary of Defense, following conflicts within the administration, particularly relating to issues concerning ISIL.
- 18 February: John Kitzhaber, Governor of Oregon, following revelations involving his fiancée, Cylvia Hayes.
- 6 March: Raosaheb Danve, Minister of State for Consumer Affairs, Food and Public Distribution of India, to accept role within the party leadership.
- 8 May: Ed Miliband, Leader of the British Labour Party, after the party's defeat following the general election.
- 8 May: Nick Clegg, Deputy Prime Minister of the United Kingdom and Leader of the Liberal Democrats, after the party's defeat following the general election.
- 3 September: Otto Pérez Molina, President of Guatemala, on grounds of corruption allegations and after being stripped of immunity by the Congress.
- 15 September: Tony Abbott, Prime Minister of Australia and leader of the Liberal Party of Australia after the defeat of leadership spill.
- 29 October: John Boehner, Speaker of the United States House of Representatives, following from within the Republic Conference.

=== 2016 ===
- 12 March: David Ong, Member of Parliament of Singapore, for an extramarital affair reportedly against a grassroots member from People's Action Party.
- 7 April: Sigmundur Davíð Gunnlaugsson, Prime Minister of Iceland, following the Panama Papers scandal.
- 22 May: Sarbananda Sonowal, Minister of State (Independent Charge) for Youth Affairs and Sports of India, to assume office as the Chief Minister of Assam.
- 5 July:
  - Sanwar Lal Jat, Minister of State for Water Resources, River Development and Ganga Rejuvenation of India, ahead of cabinet reshuffle.
  - Mohan Kundariya, Minister of State for Agriculture and Farmers Welfare of India, ahead of cabinet reshuffle.
  - Nihalchand, Minister of State for Panchayati Raj of India, ahead of cabinet reshuffle.
  - Mansukhbhai Vasava, Minister of State for Tribal Affairs of India, ahead of cabinet reshuffle.
  - Ram Shankar Katheria, Minister of State for Human Resource Development of India, ahead of cabinet reshuffle.
- 12 July:
  - Najma Heptulla, Minister of Minority Affairs of India.
  - G. M. Siddeshwara, Minister of State for Heavy Industries and Public Enterprises of India.
- 13 July: David Cameron, Prime Minister of the United Kingdom and the leader of the Conservative Party, after voters voted in favour of leaving the European Union in a Brexit referendum.
- 6 December: Manuel Valls, Prime Minister of France, to stand in the upcoming presidential election.
- 12 December: John Key, Prime Minister of New Zealand and Leader of the New Zealand National Party.
- 12 December: Matteo Renzi, Prime Minister of Italy, after losing the constitutional referendum.

=== 2017 ===
- 27 January: Nikki Haley, Governor of South Carolina, to become the United States Ambassador to the United Nations.
- 10 March: Park Geun-hye, President of South Korea, facing impeachment trials.
- 13 March: Manohar Parrikar, Minister of Defence of India, to take over as the Chief Minister of Goa.
- 10 April: Robert J. Bentley, Governor of Alabama, due to his involvement in a sex scandal with his political aide Rebekah Mason.
- 24 May: Terry Branstad, Governor of Iowa, to become the United States Ambassador to China.
- 21 June: Ram Nath Kovind, Governor of Bihar, to run in the presidential election.
- 17 July: Venkaiah Naidu, Minister of Housing and Urban Affairs and Information and Broadcasting of India, to run in the vice presidential election.
- 6 August: Halimah Yacob, Speaker of Parliament of Singapore, to seek candidacy in the presidential election.
- 3 September:
  - Kalraj Mishra, Minister of Micro, Small and Medium Enterprises of India, ahead of cabinet reshuffle.
  - Bandaru Dattatreya, Minister of State (Independent Charge) for Labour and Employment of India, ahead of cabinet reshuffle.
  - Rajiv Pratap Rudy, Minister of State (Independent Charge) for Skill Development and Entrepreneurship of India, ahead of cabinet reshuffle.
  - Faggan Singh Kulaste, Minister of State for Health and Family Welfare of India, ahead of cabinet reshuffle.
  - Sanjeev Balyan, Minister of State for Water Resources, River Development and Ganga Rejuvenation of India, ahead of cabinet reshuffle.
  - Mahendra Nath Pandey, Minister of State for Human Resource Development of India, ahead of cabinet reshuffle.
- 13 September: Raúl Fernando Sendic Rodríguez, Vice President of Uruguay, after the conclusion of an investigation regarding his use of public funds while president of the State-owned company ANCAP.
- 29 September: Tom Price, United States Secretary of Health and Human Services, following criticism of using government money to pay for private jet travel.
- 1 November: Michael Fallon, United Kingdom Secretary of State for Defence, after allegations of harassment.
- 8 November: Priti Patel, forced to resign as the United Kingdom Secretary of State for International Development, after undisclosed meeting with Israeli officials on holiday in the country.
- 21 November: Robert Mugabe, President of Zimbabwe during the military coup d'état staged by Emmerson Mnangagwa and Constantino Chiwenga.

=== 2018 ===
- 2 January: Al Franken, United States Senator for Minnesota, after accusations of sexual misconduct during a period of political sexual scandals.
- 31 January: Sam Brownback resigned as Governor of Kansas to become the United States Ambassador-at-Large for International Religious Freedom.
- 14 February: Jacob Zuma, President of South Africa.
- 15 February: Hailemariam Desalegn, Prime Minister of Ethiopia, after wave of protests in Amhara and Oromia Region.
- 9 March:
  - Ashok Gajapathi Raju, Minister of Civil Aviation of India, following Telugu Desam Party's withdrawal from the ruling coalition.
  - Sujana Chowdary, Minister of State for Science and Technology and Earth Sciences of India, following TDP's withdrawal from the ruling coalition.
- 14 March: Miro Cerar, Prime Minister of Slovenia, following a Supreme Court decision to annul a referendum result that approved a railway construction project (the largest infrastructure project of the incumbent government).
- 15 March: Robert Fico, Prime Minister of Slovakia, in the wake of mass demonstrations against his governing coalition following the murder Ján Kuciak, a journalist investigating possible ties between government officials and an Italian organized crime syndicate at the time he and his fiancée were gunned down in their home.
- 21 March: Pedro Pablo Kuczynski, President of Peru.
- 23 March: Ameenah Gurib-Fakim, President of Mauritius, following a scandal involving credit cards and shopping sprees.
- 24 March: Paolo Gentiloni, Prime Minister of Italy, following the general election.
- 10 April: Tom Bossert, United States Homeland Security Advisor.
- 29 April: Amber Rudd, United Kingdom Home Secretary, following misleading Parliament in the aftermath of the Windrush scandal.
- 1 June: Eric Greitens, resigned as Governor of Missouri after accusations of sexual misconduct and misusing a charity donor list.
- 4 June: Olivier Mahafaly Solonandrasana, Prime Minister of Madagascar.
- 9 June: Boris Johnson, United Kingdom Secretary of State for Foreign and Commonwealth Affairs, following differences with Prime Minister Theresa May over Brexit policy.
- 8 July: David Davis, United Kingdom Secretary of State for Exiting the European Union, following differences with Prime Minister Theresa May over Brexit Policy.
- 24 August: Malcolm Turnbull, Prime Minister of Australia, following the party leadership spills.
- 17 October: M. J. Akbar, Minister of State for External Affairs of India, due to number of sexual harassment allegations.
- 24 October: Jeremy Heywood, United Kingdom Cabinet Secretary, due to ill health following a three-month leave of absence.
- 1 November: Tracey Crouch, United Kingdom Parliamentary Under-Secretary of State for Sport, Civil Society and Loneliness, over the government's refusal to phase in changes to betting policy before Spring 2019, sparking cross-party rebellion in Parliament.
- 7 November: Jeff Sessions, United States Attorney General, following differences with President Donald Trump over his recusal from investigations relating to Russian election interference.
- 9 November: Jo Johnson, United Kingdom Minister of State for Transport and Minister for London, following differences with the Prime Minister Theresa May over the government's Brexit policy.
- 15 November: Dominic Raab, United Kingdom Secretary of State for Exiting the European Union, in protest to the draft EU Withdrawal agreement approved by Cabinet the previous day.
- 15 November: Esther McVey, United Kingdom Secretary of State for Work and Pensions, in protest to the draft EU Withdrawal agreement approved by Cabinet the previous day.
- 11 December: Upendra Kushwaha, Minister of State for Human Resource Development of India, following his party's withdrawal from the ruling coalition.

=== 2019 ===
- 1 January: Jim Mattis, United States Secretary of Defense, after failing to convince President Donald Trump to reconsider his decision to withdraw all American troops from Syria.
- 2 January: Ryan Zinke, United States Secretary of the Interior, following a series of ethical scandals.
- 8 March: Kummanam Rajasekharan, Governor of Mizoram, to contest the general election.
- 14 March: Sigríður Á. Andersen, Minister of Justice of Iceland, after the European Court of Human Rights found her appointments of judges to the Iceland court of appeals to be illegal.
- 10 April: Kirstjen Nielsen, United States Secretary of Homeland Security, following differences with President Donald Trump over failure to secure United States borders.
- 26 May: Peter O'Neill, Prime Minister of Papua New Guinea, over disputes of him holding dual citizenship and after weeks of defections from his coalition government.
- 6 June: Lars Løkke Rasmussen, Prime Minister of Denmark, after his party's defeating in the general election.
- 19 July: Alexander Acosta, United States Secretary of Labor, following criticism over his role in mishandling Jeffrey Epstein case.
- 24 July: Theresa May, Prime Minister of the United Kingdom, after her party) called for her to step down because of her inability to pass the Brexit withdrawal agreement.
- 24 July: Ricardo Rosselló, Governor of Puerto Rico, following massive protests against scandals involving him.
- 19 July: Ramush Haradinaj, Prime Minister of Kosovo, after being summoned by the Kosovo Specialist Chambers and Specialist Prosecutor's Office to be interviewed as a suspect.
- 22 August: Iakoba Italeli, Governor-General of Tuvalu, to rejoin politics.
- 5 September: Jo Johnson, United Kingdom Minister of State for Universities, Science, Research and Innovation, following Prime Minister Boris Johnson's decision to prorogue Parliament.
- 10 September: John Bolton, United States National Security Adviser.
- 7 September: Amber Rudd, United Kingdom Secretary of State for Works and Pensions, citing what she described as Johnson's "purge" of the party and his "failure" to pursue a Brexit deal with the EU.
- 10 November: Evo Morales, President of Bolivia, following the civilian protests and an OAS audit that revealed irregularities in the general election.
- 11 November: Arvind Sawant, Minister of Heavy Industries and Public Enterprises of India, after his party's withdrawal from the government.
- 1 December: Adil Abdul-Mahdi, Prime Minister of Iraq, in reaction to the 2019–2021 Iraqi protests.
- 1 December: Rick Perry, United States Secretary of Energy.
- 10 December: Antti Rinne, Prime Minister of Finland, after losing support from the Centre Party.

=== 2020 ===
- 13 February: Sajid Javid, United Kingdom Chancellor of the Exchequer, during cabinet reshuffle.
- 24 February: Mahathir Mohamad, Prime Minister of Malaysia, following political crisis.
- 15 May: Nelson Teich, Minister of Health of Brazil, following disagreements with President Jair Bolsonaro.
- 25 June: Ivan Collendavelloo, Deputy Prime Minister of Mauritius and Minister of Energy, following the St Louis gate scandal.
- 6 August: G. C. Murmu, Lieutenant Governor of Jammu and Kashmir, to become the Comptroller and Auditor General of India.
- 17 September: Harsimrat Kaur Badal, Minister of Food Processing Industries of India, in protest against the government's introduction of new farm laws.
- 5 November: Hashim Thaçi, President of Kosovo, after being summoned by Kosovo Specialist Chambers.

=== 2021 ===
- 6 January: Nando Bodha, Minister of Foreign Affairs of Mauritius, over disagreements with the Militant Socialist Movement over its handling of emergent national matters.
- 8 January: Betsy DeVos, United States Secretary of Education, in the aftermath of the January 6 Capitol attack.
- 9 January: Derrick Evans, West Virginia Delegate, after arrest for his role in the Capitol attack.
- 11 January: Elaine Chao, United States Secretary of Transportation, in the aftermath of the Capitol attack.
- 11 January: Chad Wolf, Acting United States Secretary of Homeland Security, in the aftermath of the Capitol attack.
- 13 January: Jüri Ratas, Prime Minister of Estonia, after an investigation suspected that his party was involved in "criminal involvement" in relation to businessman Hillar Teder.
- 15 January: Mark Rutte, Prime Minister of the Netherlands and his entire cabinet, over the childcare benefits scandal.
- 18 January: Kamala Harris, United States Senator, to take office as Vice President of the United States.
- 22 January: Julie Payette, Governor General of Canada, following the conclusion of a workplace review that found she had "belittled, berated and publicly humiliated Rideau Hall staff" and "created a toxic, verbally abusive workplace".
- 26 January: Giuseppe Conte, Prime Minister of Italy, after a confidence vote in his government failed to pass with an absolute majority in the Senate
- 10 February: Yogida Sawmynaden, Minister of Commerce of Mauritius, following a scandal involving fictitious employment and the murder of a political activist.
- 2 March: Gina Raimondo, Governor of Rhode Island, to assume office as the United States Secretary of Commerce.
- 18 March: Xavier Becerra, Attorney General of California, to assume office as the United States Attorney General.
- 26 June: Matt Hancock, United Kingdom Secretary of State for Health, after breaching COVID-19 guidelines, which involved having an affair with his aide.
- 6 July: Thawar Chand Gehlot, Minister of Social Justice and Empowerment of India, to become the Governor of Karnataka.
- 7 July:
  - Sadananda Gowda, Minister of Chemicals and Fertilizers of India, ahead of cabinet reshuffle.
  - Ravi Shankar Prasad, Minister of Law and Justice, Communications, and Electronics and Information Technology of India, ahead of cabinet reshuffle.
  - Ramesh Pokhriyal, Minister of Education of India, ahead of cabinet reshuffle.
  - Harsh Vardhan, Minister of Health and Family Welfare, Science and Technology, and Earth Sciences of India, ahead of cabinet reshuffle.
  - Prakash Javadekar, Minister of Environment, Forest and Climate Change, Information and Broadcasting, and Heavy Industries and Public Enterprises of India, ahead of cabinet reshuffle.
  - Santosh Kumar Gangwar, Minister of State (Independent Charge) of Labour and Employment of India, ahead of cabinet reshuffle.
  - Babul Supriyo, Minister of State for Environment, Forest and Climate Change of India, ahead of cabinet reshuffle.
  - Sanjay Shamrao Dhotre, Minister of State for Education, Communications, and Electronics and Information Technology of India, ahead of cabinet reshuffle.
  - Rattan Lal Kataria, Minister of State for Jal Shakti and Social Justice and Empowerment of India, ahead of cabinet reshuffle.
  - Pratap Chandra Sarangi, Minister of State for Micro, Small and Medium Enterprises, and Animal Husbandry, Fisheries and Dairying of India, ahead of cabinet reshuffle.
  - Debasree Chaudhuri, Minister of State for Women and Child Development of India, ahead of cabinet reshuffle.
- 23 August: Andrew Cuomo, Governor of New York, following growing scrutiny due to allegations of sexual harassment.
- 3 September: Yoshihide Suga, Prime Minister of Japan.
- 15 September: Baby Rani Maurya, Governor of Uttarakhand, to rejoin active politics.
- 9 October: Sebastian Kurz, Chancellor of Austria, after the start of the Kurz corruption probe.
- 2 December: Alexander Schallenberg, Chancellor of Austria.

=== 2022 ===
- 6 January 2022: Askar Mamin, Prime Minister of Kazakhstan, amidst protests against a sharp increase in fuel prices.
- 30 June: Christopher Pincher, Government Deputy Chief Whip and Treasurer of the Household, after admitting of being very drunk the night before at the private Carlton Club.
- 24 June: Oliver Dowden, Chairman of the Conservative Party and Minister without Portfolio, following the party's defeat in the Tiverton and Honiton by-election and Wakefield by-election.
- 5 July:
  - Sajid Javid, United Kingdom Secretary of State for Health and Social Care.
  - Rishi Sunak, United Kingdom Chancellor of the Exchequer.
  - Bim Afolami, Vice-Chair of the Conservative Party, owing to recent scandals in government under Boris Johnson.
  - Alex Chalk, Solicitor General for England and Wales, citing the Owen Paterson scandal, Partygate and the Chris Pincher scandal.
- 6 July:
  - Will Quince, United Kingdom Parliamentary Under-Secretary of State for Children and Families.
  - Laura Trott, United Kingdom Parliamentary Private Secretary to the Department for Transport.
  - Robin Walker, United Kingdom Minister of State for School Standards.
  - John Glen, United Kingdom Economic Secretary to the Treasury.
  - Felicity Buchan, Parliamentary Private Secretary in the Department for Business, Energy and Industrial Strategy, in protest against the leadership of Prime Minister Boris Johnson over his handling of the Chris Pincher scandal.
  - Victoria Atkins, United Kingdom Minister of State for Prisons and Probation, citing issues around the Owen Paterson Scandal, Partygate, Chris Pincher scandal, and fractured values under the leadership of Boris Johnson.
  - Stuart Andrew, United Kingdom Minister of State for Housing, following recent scandals involving the Prime Minister Boris Johnson, losing confidence in Prime Minister Boris Johnson as a result of the Chris Pincher scandal.
  - Julia Lopez, Minister of State for Media, Data, and Digital Infrastructure, losing confidence in Prime Minister Boris Johnson as a result of the Chris Pincher scandal.
  - Lee Rowley, Parliamentary Under-Secretary of State for Local Government and Building Safety, losing confidence in Prime Minister Boris Johnson as a result of the Chris Pincher scandal.
  - Alex Burghart, Parliamentary Under-Secretary of State for Apprenticeships and Skills, losing confidence in Prime Minister Boris Johnson as a result of the Chris Pincher scandal.
  - Neil O'Brien, Parliamentary Under-Secretary of State for Levelling Up, The Union and Constitution, losing confidence in Prime Minister Boris Johnson as a result of the Chris Pincher scandal.
  - Kemi Badenoch, Minister of State for Local Government, Faith and Communities, losing confidence in Prime Minister Boris Johnson as a result of the Chris Pincher scandal.
  - Mims Davies, Parliamentary Under-Secretary of State for Employment, losing confidence in Prime Minister Boris Johnson as a result of the Chris Pincher scandal.
- 6 July:
  - Mukhtar Abbas Naqvi, Minister of Minority Affairs of India, following end of tenure as member of the Rajya Sabha.
  - Ramchandra Prasad Singh, Minister of Steel of India, following end of tenure as member of the Rajya Sabha.
- 7 July:
  - Chris Philp, Parliamentary Under-Secretary of State for Tech and the Digital Economy.
  - Boris Johnson, Prime Minister of the United Kingdom, following massive allegations and resignations from his government.
- 21 July: Mario Draghi, Prime Minister of Italy, after a confidence vote in his government failed to pass with an absolute majority in the Senate.
- 20 October: Liz Truss, Prime Minister of the United Kingdom.
- 8 November: Gavin Williamson, United Kingdom Minister without portfolio, following accusations of bullying.

=== 2023 ===
- 19 January: Jacinda Ardern, Prime Minister of New Zealand, citing burnout while facing an upcoming election and low polling numbers.
- 7 February: Ron Klain, White House Chief of Staff.
- 17 February:
  - Bhagat Singh Koshyari, Governor of Maharashtra.
  - R. K. Mathur, Lieutenant Governor of Ladakh.
- 11 March: Marty Walsh, United States Secretary of Labor, to assume the position of executive director of the National Hockey League Players' Association.
- 7 May: Eduard Heger, Prime Minister of Slovakia, following a corruption scandal and a political crisis.
- 7 July:
  - Tharman Shanmugaratnam, Senior Minister of Singapore, following his announcement to contest the presidential election. for presidency in the 2023 Presidential election.
  - Mark Rutte, Prime Minister of the Netherlands, following the parties failed to reach an agreement and unanimously decided that they could not continue working together within the coalition.
- 17 July: Tan Chuan-Jin, Speaker of the Parliament of Singapore and backbencher Cheng Li Hui, following a scandal about their infidelity between both members in question. A week before the resignation, Tan had since apologized after being caught using "unparliamentary language" to an opposition member of parliament Jamus Lim on 17 April, which might also factored to his resignation as well.
- 27 September: Anthony Rota, Speaker of the House of Commons of Canada, following his invitation and recognition of Yaroslav Hunka.
- 6 December: Robert Jenrick, United Kingdom Minister of State for Immigration, over the government's Rwanda asylum plan.
- 19 November:
  - Yeafesh Osman, Minister of Science and Technology of Bangladesh, ahead of the general election.
  - Mustafa Jabbar, Minister of Posts and Telecommunications of Bangladesh, ahead of the general election.
  - Shamsul Alam, Minister of State for Planning of Bangladesh, ahead of the general election.
- 7 December:
  - Narendra Singh Tomar, Minister of Agriculture and Farmers' Welfare of India, to assume office as the Speaker of the Madhya Pradesh Legislative Assembly.
  - Prahlad Singh Patel, Minister of State for Food Processing Industries and Jal Shakti of India, to assume office as Cabinet Minister in the state government of Madhya Pradesh.
  - Renuka Singh Saruta, Minister of State for Tribal Affairs of India, after being elected as member of the Chhattisgarh Legislative Assembly

=== 2024 ===
- 18 January: S. Iswaran, Minister for Transport of Singapore, citing investigations on corruption connected to Ong Beng Seng.
- 26 February: Katalin Novák, President of Hungary, following Pardon scandal.
- 12 March: Ariel Henry, Acting President and Prime Minister of Haiti, in the midst of a major security crisis.
- 12 March: Manohar Lal Khattar, Chief Minister of Haryana.
- 15 March: James Heappey, Minister of State for the Armed Forces of the United Kingdom cited personal issues.
- 18 March: Tamilisai Soundararajan, Governor of Telangana and Lieutenant Governor of Puducherry.
- 19 March: Pashupati Kumar Paras, Minister of Food Processing Industries of India, after seat-sharing disagreement with the ruling coalition.
- 20 March: Võ Văn Thưởng, President of Vietnam.
- 5 April: Katrín Jakobsdóttir, Prime Minister of Iceland, to run for president.
- 15 July: Kaja Kallas, Prime Minister of Estonia, to assume the role of High Representative of the Union for Foreign Affairs and Security Policy.
- 16 July: Gabriel Attal, Prime Minister of France.
- 5 August: Sheikh Hasina, Prime Minister of Bangladesh, following a series of violent protests.
- 5 December: Michel Barnier, Prime Minister of France.
- 16 December: Chrystia Freeland, Deputy Prime Minister and Finance Minister of Canada

=== 2025 ===
- 6 January: Justin Trudeau, Prime Minister of Canada
- 10 January: Karl Nehammer, Chancellor of Austria
- 12 February: Klaus Iohannis, President of Romania
- 4 April: Yoon Suk Yeol, President of South Korea, facing impeachment.
- 3 June : Fleur Agema, Dirk Beljaarts, Barry Madlener, Marjolein Faber, Reinette Klever, Zsolt Szabó, Vicky Maeijer, Chris Jansen, Ingrid Coenradie, members of the Dutch Schoof cabinet
- 3 June : Luvsannamsrain Oyun-Erdene, Prime Minister of Mongolia
- 29 August: Paetongtarn Shinawatra, Prime Minister of Thailand, removed from office over a phone call leak.
- 7 September : Shigeru Ishiba, Prime Minister of Japan, resigned in the aftermath of both elections under his tenure (2024 parliamentary and 2025 senate) and ongoing economic trends.
- 9 September : K. P. Sharma Oli, Prime Minister of Nepal
- 10 October: Dina Boluarte, President of Peru, facing impeachment.

=== 2026 ===
- 22 June: Keir Starmer, Prime Minister of the United Kingdom, amidst Labour Party's internal leadership crisis which began on 7 May.
- 20 July: Muhammad Faishal Ibrahim, office holder and Member of Parliament of Singapore since 2006, citing interactions with a woman that lapsed standards required of a political office holder and MP.
- 17 September: Ulf Kristersson, Prime Minister of Sweden, following the defeat of his bloc in the 2026 Swedish general election.
- 6 October: Christine Fréchette, leader of the Coalition Avenir Québec, following the defeat of her party in the 2026 Quebec general election
- 12 November: Gibran Rakabuming Raka, Vice President of Indonesia, due to a escalating controversy and legal dispute surrounding his high school educational credentials and eligibility for office.

== See also ==
- List of resignations in Iceland
- List of resignations from the second May ministry
- List of departures from the first Johnson ministry
- List of departures from the second Johnson ministry
- List of Trump administration dismissals and resignations
