= B. Jayachandran =

Indian photographer and reporter (born 1956)

B.Jayachandran
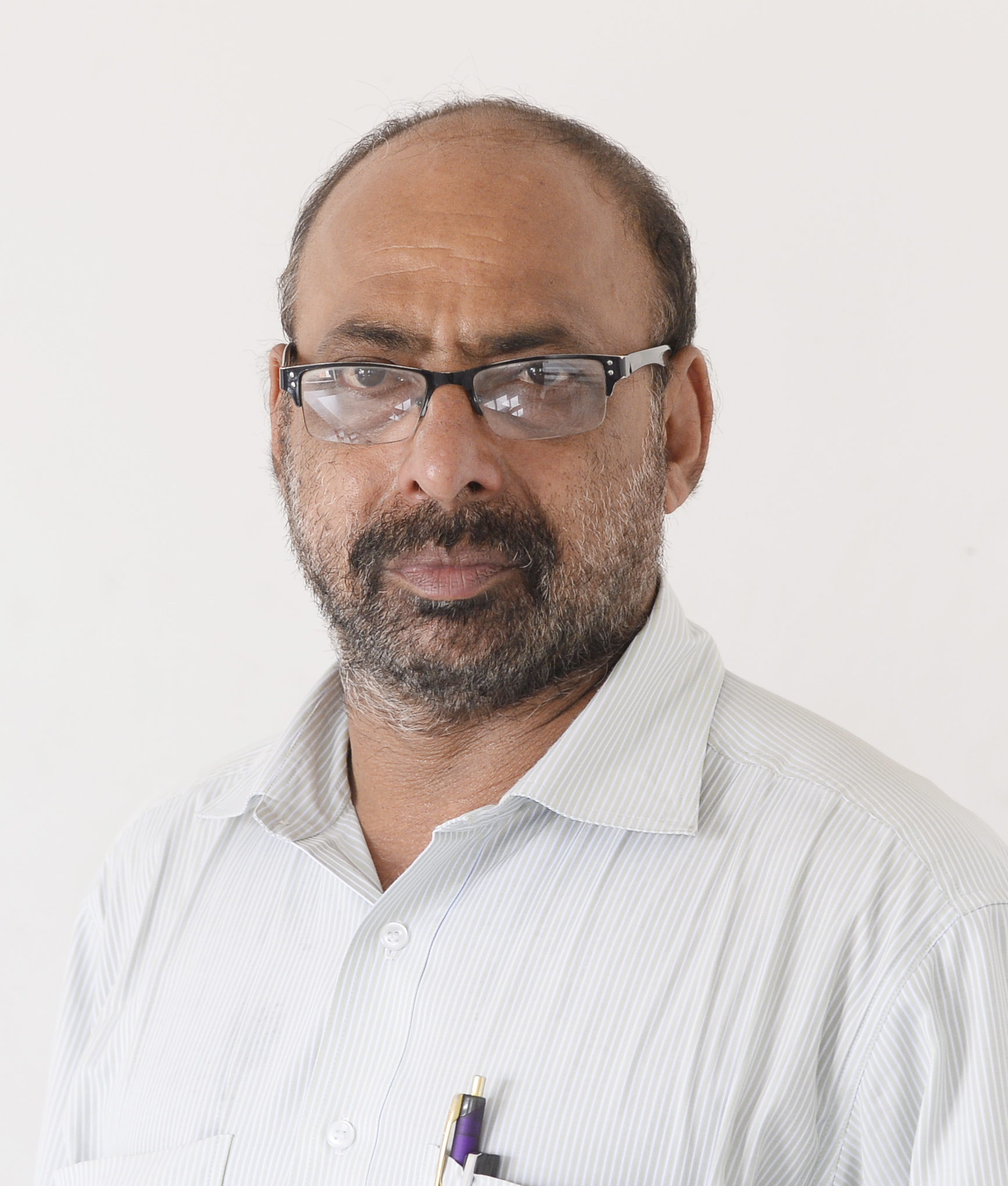
- Born: 1 January 1956 (age 70); Thiruvananthapuram, India
- Occupations: Journalist, writer, film director, photographer
- Years active: 1982–present
- Spouse: Sasikala
- Children: 2
- Awards: Special Award from Commonwealth Foundation, Kerala state film award 2012, Best documentary (A Saga of benevolence), UNICEF Award in 1985, Best News Photography Award from Kerala state government, Best Sports Photography Award from Kerala state government, Kerala University Award.

B.Jayachandran (born 1 October 1956) is an Indian journalism photographer and reporter. He was the Picture Editor in Chief of Malayala Manorama. Jayachandran is also the Director and Writer of Films and documentary films.

== Personal life ==
Born in Thiruvananthapuram, Jayachandran is the son of the artist and decorator T R Bhaskaran Nair and Kamalamma P. He studied at Karamana Government High School and received a degree in BSC Mathematics from Mar Ivanious College at the University of Kerala. Jayachandran trained in art, painting, photography and set decoration with his father. He is married to Sasikala S.

== Career ==
In 1982, Jayachandran joined Malayala Manorama, as a trainee photographer. In 1984, he was appointed news photographer in the Thiruvananthapuram Bureau in 1984. Jayachandran was promoted to senior photographer in 1990, chief photographer in 1994.

In 1997, Jayachandran joined New Delhi Bureau as the chief photographer in 1997 and posted picture editor Thiruvananthapuram Unit in 2005 and promoted senior picture editor in 2015

== Filmography ==
As director

- Kailash-Manasa sarovar Yatra (2006) - Directed the documentary "Kailash-Manasa sarovar Yatra" for Malayala Manorama, it was screened in over 10,000 venues in Kerala in 2006.
- Travancore, A Saga of Benevolence (2012) - The Film is about the former royal family of Travancore. It is 1-hour 45 minute long. The film was adjudged as the Best Documentary of 2011 at the Kerala State Film Awards. It was produced and directed by Jayachandran,
- Drisya Shringam, Kasi to Kailash The Himalayas (2015) - for Malayala Manorama. The first screening was in September 2015.

== Special Projects ==
- Photographed E M Shankaran Namboothiripad for 16 years, The entire project was published by Malayala Manorama as a coffee table book titled "Portrait of a Long March", and was released by Indian President K R Narayanan on 15 November 1999. Created EMS gallery with huge 119 canvas pictures in EMS Academy, Vilappilsala, Thiruvananthapuram.
- "Words and Images", "An Odyssey Into the Landscape and Minds cape of Indian Writing" is an exploration through the medium of photography, the landscape of Indian writers. The Kendra Sahitya Academy organized an exhibition of the photographs generated as of the project at Delhi in April 2002. Krishen Kant inaugurated the exhibition in New Delhi and Thiruvananthapuram.
- Created sree Uthradom Tirunal Marthanda Varma Chithralayam, which reveals the last two centuries with 220 photo paintings, in Travancore Museum complex, Fort, Thiruvananthapuram.
- Organized the production of "Visual History of Travancore" book, published by Malayala Manorama in 2012.

== Awards ==
- Special Award from Commonwealth Foundation for the Picture "Freedom" (Photograph of Tibetan refugees) in 1999.
- UNICEF Award in 1985.
- Best News Photography Award from Kerala state government in 1987, 1993 and 1994.
- Best Sports Photography Award from Kerala state government in 1992.
- News Photography Award from Trivandrum Press Club in 1990, 1991 and from Calicut Press Club in 1990, 1992 and 1993.
- Kerala University Award in 1984, 1985, 1989 and 1990.
