= Abdication =

Voluntary or forced renunciation of sovereign power

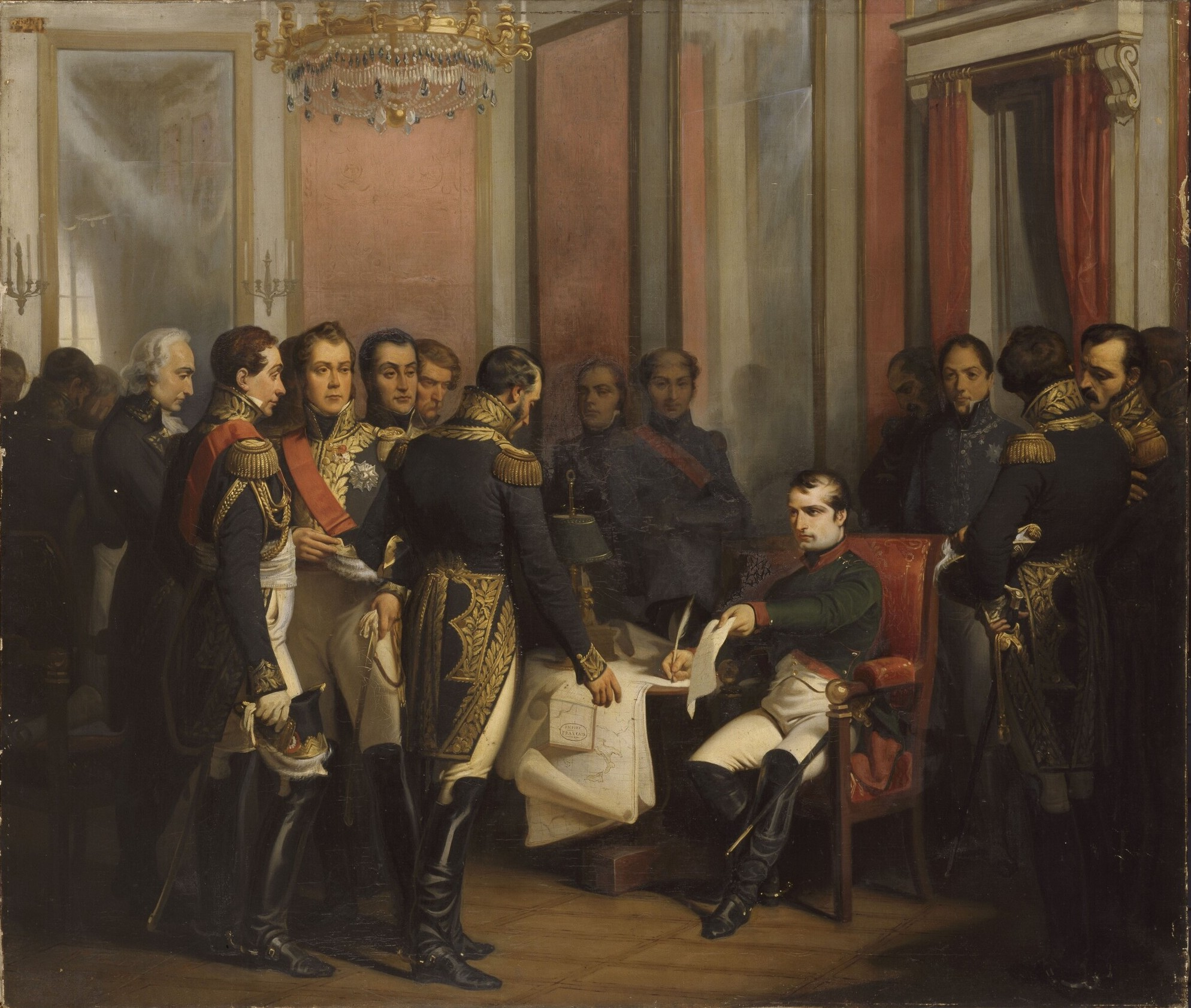
Napoleon Signing His Abdication at Fontainebleau by François Bouchot. Napoleon's first abdication, signed at the Palace of Fontainebleau on 4 April 1814

Abdication is the act of formally relinquishing monarchical authority. Abdications have played various roles in the succession procedures of monarchies. While some cultures have viewed abdication as an extreme abandonment of duty, in other societies (such as pre-Meiji Restoration Japan), abdication was a regular event and helped maintain stability during political succession.

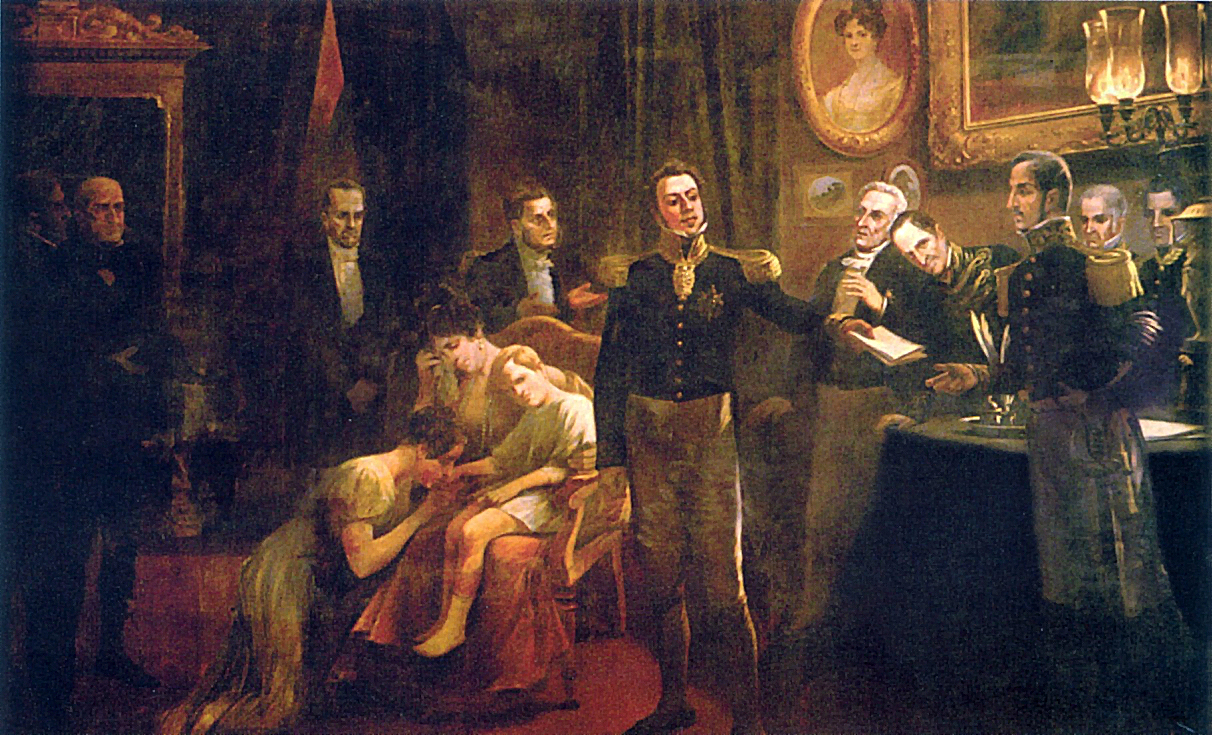
Dom Pedro I, founder and emperor of the Empire of Brazil, delivers his abdication letter on 7 April 1831

Historically, abdications have occurred both by force (where the regnant was dethroned, thus forced to abdicate on pain of death or other severe consequences) and voluntarily. Some rulers are deemed to have abdicated in absentia, vacating the physical throne and thus their position of power, although these judgements were generally pronounced by successors with vested interests in seeing the throne abdicated, and often without or despite the direct input of the abdicating monarch.

Recently, due to the largely ceremonial nature of the regnant in many constitutional monarchies, many monarchs have abdicated due to old age, such as the monarchs of Belgium, Denmark, Cambodia, the Netherlands, Spain, and Japan.

== Terminology ==
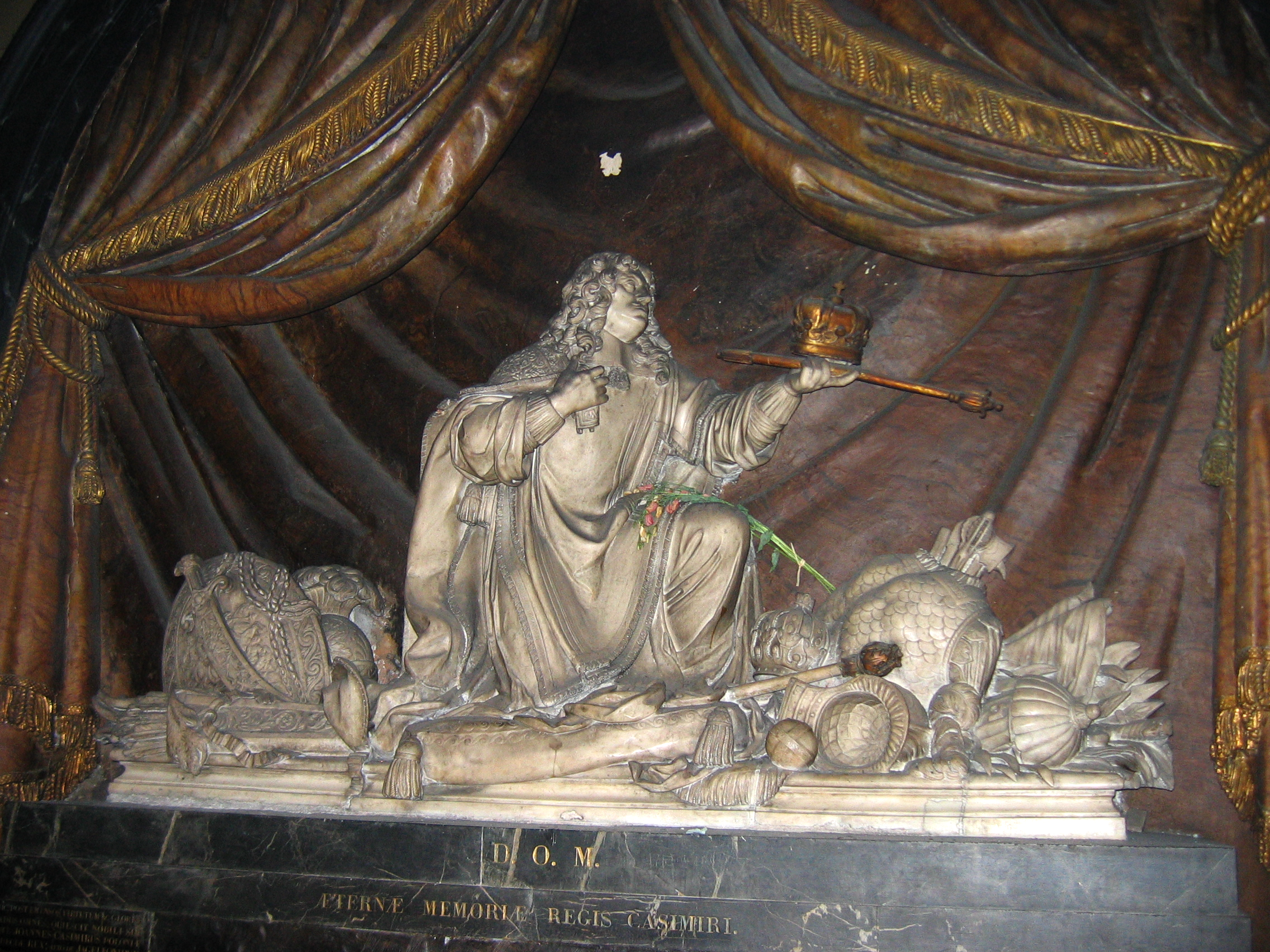
Tomb effigy of heart of King John II Casimir Vasa at Abbaye de Saint-Germain-des-Prés in Paris, showing removal of the crown

The word abdication is derived from the Latin abdicatio meaning to disown or renounce (ab, away from, and dicare, to proclaim). In its broadest sense abdication is the act of renouncing and resigning from any formal office, but it is applied especially to the supreme office of state. In Roman law the term was also applied to the disowning of a family member, such as disinheriting a son. Today the term is commonly only used for monarchs. An elected or appointed official is said to resign rather than to abdicate. A notable exception is the voluntary relinquishing of the office of Bishop of Rome (and thus sovereign of the Vatican City State) by the pope, called papal resignation or papal renunciation.

== Historical examples ==
In certain cultures, the abdication of a monarch was seen as a profound and shocking abandonment of royal duty. As a result, abdications usually only occurred in the most extreme circumstances of political turmoil or violence. Likewise, when abdications were forced on an incompetent or tyrannical ruler, only the severest of circumstances would entail the risk in compelling it. The forced abdication may also be viewed as a vicious abuse of power by those who compel it.

For other cultures, abdication was a much more routine element of succession, often employed to smooth the transition process between monarchs.

=== Roman Empire ===
Among the most notable abdications of antiquity are those of Lucius Quinctius Cincinnatus, the Roman dictator, in 458 and 439 BC; Lucius Cornelius Sulla, the Roman dictator, in 79 BC; Emperor Diocletian in AD 305; and Emperor Romulus Augustulus in AD 476.

=== The papacy, the Papal States and Vatican City ===
Due to the complex nature of the office of pope (head of the worldwide Catholic Church and sovereign of the Papal States from 754 to 1870 and of Vatican City since 1929), a papal abdication involves both the spiritual and the secular sphere. Technically, the correct term for a reigning pope voluntarily stepping down as bishop of Rome is renunciation or resignation, as regulated in Canon 332 §2 of the 1983 Code of Canon Law.

The debate is open about some disputed resignations in the early Middle Ages: the last three popes to resign were Celestine V in 1294, Gregory XII in 1415, to end the Western Schism, and Benedict XVI in 2013, who was succeeded by Francis. Benedict's resignation, which occurred 598 years after the last time a pope did so, and 719 years after the last one who renounced entirely on his own volition, was an event unheard of for more than half a millennium, as well as being the first papal resignation since the Reformation and Counter-Reformation, and was met with a great deal of surprise worldwide.

=== Venice ===
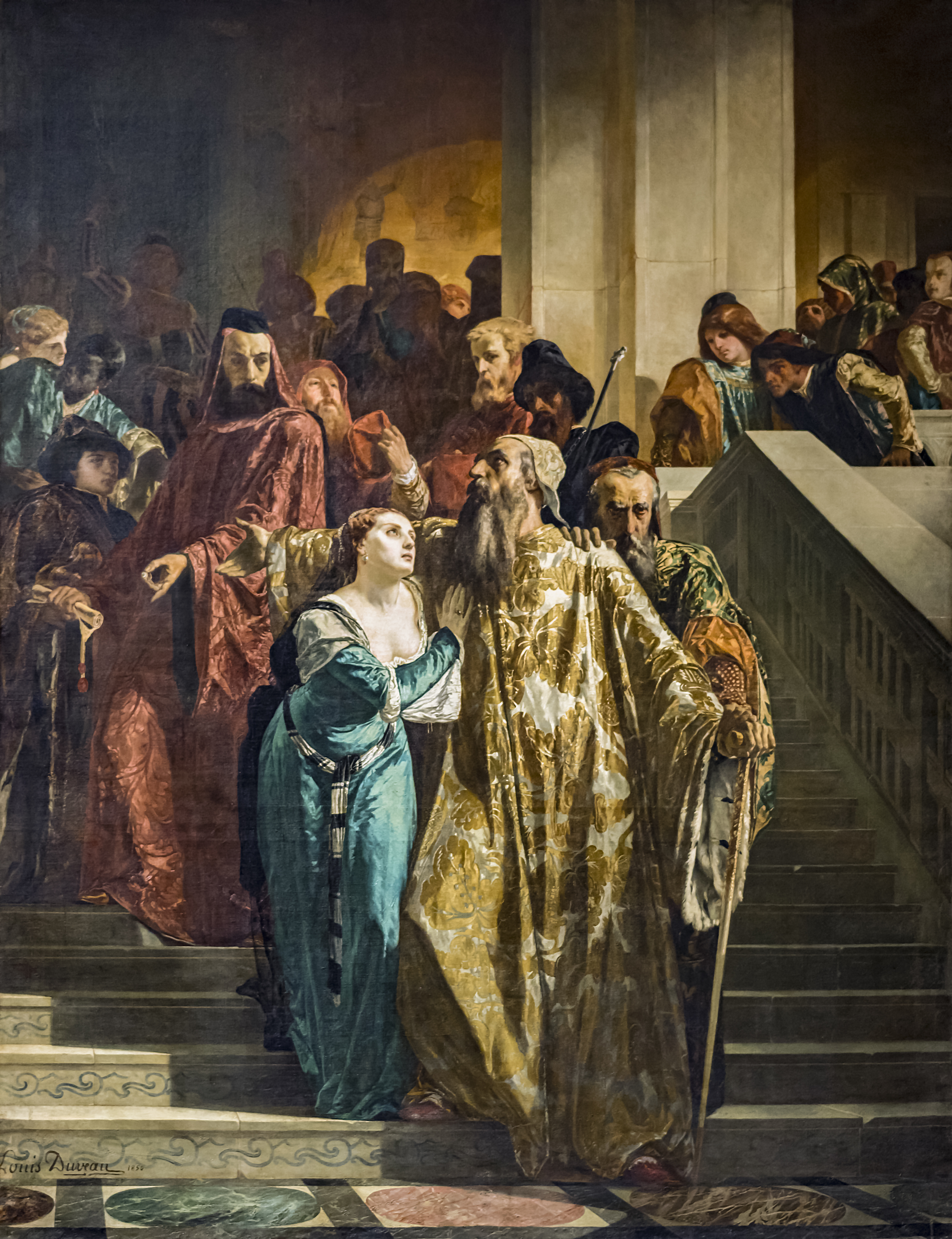
The Abdication of Doge Foscari by Louis Duveau

After the exile of his son Jacopo for treasonable correspondence, and Jacopo's subsequent death in Crete, Francesco Foscari withdrew from his duties. in October 1457 the Council of Ten forced him to abdicate. He died within a week, and the public outcry forced a state funeral.

Lord Byron drew on this incident for his play The Two Foscari. Many other works of literature and art drew upon it.

=== Britain ===
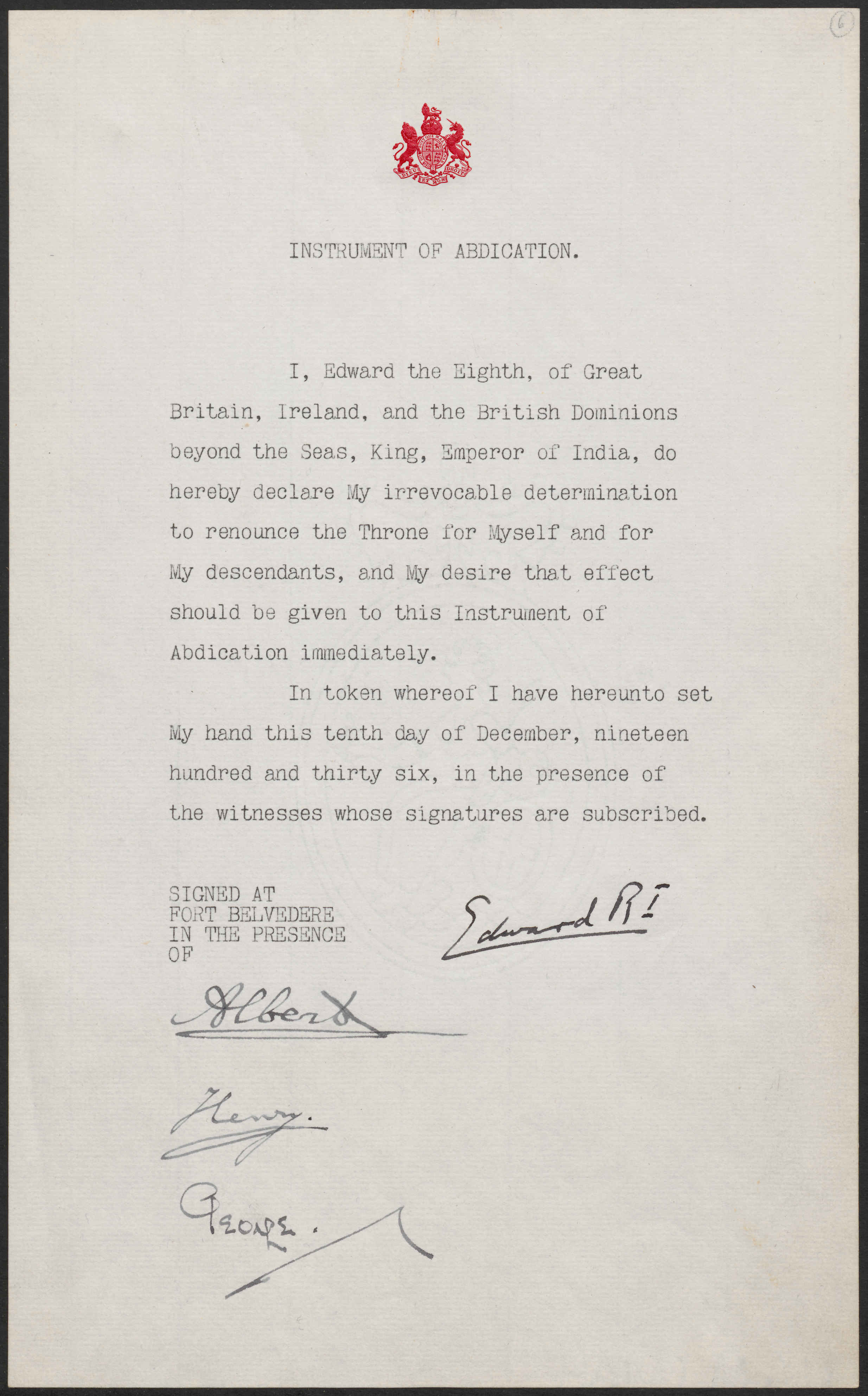
Instrument of abdication signed by Edward VIII and his three brothers, Albert, Henry and George, 10 December 1936

One of the most well-known abdications in recent history is that of King Edward VIII of the United Kingdom and the Dominions. In 1936 Edward abdicated to marry American divorcée Wallis Simpson, over the objections of the royal family, the British establishment, the governments of the Commonwealth and the Church of England.

Richard II was forced to abdicate in 1399 after power was seized by his paternal first cousin Henry Bolingbroke while Richard was abroad.

During the Glorious Revolution in 1688, James II and VII fled to France, dropping the Great Seal of the Realm into the Thames, and the question was discussed in Parliament whether he had forfeited the throne or had abdicated. The latter designation was agreed upon in spite of James's protest, and in a full assembly of the Lords and Commons it was resolved "that King James II having endeavoured to subvert the constitution of the kingdom, by breaking the original contract between king and people, and, by the advice of Jesuits and other wicked persons, having violated the fundamental laws, and having withdrawn himself out of this kingdom, has abdicated the government, and that the throne is thereby vacant." The Scottish Parliament pronounced a decree of forfeiture and deposition.

In Scotland, Mary, Queen of Scots, was forced to abdicate in 1567 in favour of her one-year-old son, James VI.

Today, because the title to the Crown depends upon statute, particularly the Act of Settlement 1701, a royal abdication can be effected only by an act of Parliament; under the terms of the Statute of Westminster 1931, such an act must be agreed by the parliaments of all extant signatories of the Statute. To give legal effect to the abdication of King Edward VIII, His Majesty's Declaration of Abdication Act 1936 was passed.

=== China ===
In 579, Emperor Xuan abdicated the throne to his 6-year-old son. His son was born in 573 when Xuan was only 14.

=== Japan ===
In Japanese history, abdication was used very often, and in fact occurred more often than death on the throne. Empress Jitō became the first monarch to abdicate. Initially, abdication was mainly done by female Emperors. It wasn't until the Heian period (specifically near the end) where abdication became a tradition. During the Heian and later periods, most executive authority resided in the hands of regents (see Sesshō and Kampaku), and the emperor's chief task was priestly, containing so many repetitive rituals that it was deemed the incumbent emperor deserved pampered retirement as an honoured retired emperor after a service of around ten years. A tradition developed that an emperor should accede to the throne relatively young. The high-priestly duties were deemed possible for a walking child; and a dynast who had passed his toddler years was regarded as suitable and old enough; reaching the age of legal majority was not a requirement. Thus, many Japanese emperors have acceded as children, some only 6 or 8 years old. Childhood apparently helped the monarch to endure tedious duties and to tolerate subjugation to political power brokers, as well as sometimes to cloak the truly powerful members of the imperial dynasty. Almost all Japanese empresses and dozens of emperors abdicated and lived the rest of their lives in pampered retirement, wielding influence behind the scenes, often with more power than they had had while on the throne (see Cloistered rule). Several emperors abdicated while still in their teens. These traditions show in Japanese folklore, theatre, literature and other forms of culture, where the emperor is usually described or depicted as an adolescent.

Before the Meiji Restoration, Japan had eight reigning empresses, with two reigning twice, making ten times Japan was ruled by a woman. The two who reigned twice, Kōgyoku and Kōken abdicated during their first reign, but not their second. Other than them, Suiko is the only female emperor of Japan not to abdicate. Typically a woman abdicated after a suitable male heir either was found or came of age, with Genmei being the exception who abdicated in favour of her daughter, Genshō.

There is also no provision for abdication in the Imperial Household Law, the Meiji Constitution, or the current 1947 Constitution of Japan.

After the defeat of Japan in World War II, many members of the Imperial Family, such as Princes Chichibu, Takamatsu and Higashikuni, pressured then-Emperor Hirohito to abdicate so that one of the princes could serve as regent until Crown Prince Akihito came of age. On 27 February 1946, the Emperor's youngest brother, Prince Mikasa (Takahito), even stood up in the privy council and indirectly urged the Emperor to step down and accept responsibility for Japan's defeat. U.S. Army General Douglas MacArthur insisted that Emperor Hirohito remain on the throne. MacArthur saw the emperor as a symbol of the continuity and cohesion of the Japanese people.

On 13 July 2016, national broadcaster NHK reported that Emperor Akihito intended to abdicate in favour of his eldest son Crown Prince Naruhito within a few years, citing his age; an abdication within the Imperial Family had not occurred since Emperor Kōkaku abdicated in 1817. However, senior officials within the Imperial Household Agency denied that there was any official plan for the monarch to abdicate. A potential abdication by the Emperor required an amendment to the Imperial Household Law, which at that time had no provisions for such a move. On 8 August 2016, the Emperor gave a rare televised address, where he emphasized his advanced age and declining health; this address was interpreted as an implication of his intention to abdicate.

On 19 May 2017, the bill that would allow Akihito to abdicate was issued by the Japanese government's cabinet. On 8 June 2017, the National Diet passed a one-off bill allowing Akihito to abdicate, and for the government to begin arranging the process of handing over the position to Crown Prince Naruhito. On 1 December 2017, following a meeting of the Imperial Household Council, Prime Minister Shinzo Abe announced that the abdication would occur at the end of 30 April 2019.

=== India ===
According to Jain sources written almost 800 years after his reign, Chandragupta, the first emperor of the Mauryan Dynasty abdicated and became a Jain monk in the last years of his life.

=== Other examples in recent history ===
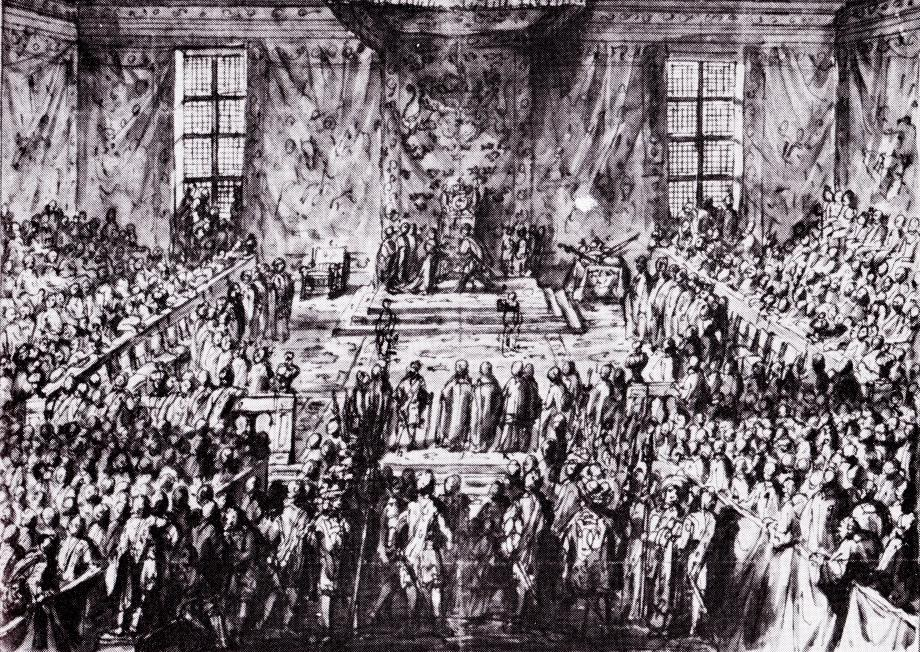
Queen Christina of Sweden shocked Europe by abdicating to move to Rome.

The chaos of Germany's defeat in the First World War forced German Emperor (Kaiser) Wilhelm II to abdicate his throne as German Emperor and consequentially, his throne as King of Prussia. The following Treaty of Versailles resulted in the abolition of both monarchies, leading to the other German kings, dukes, princes and other nobility to abdicate and renounce their royalty titles.

Hussein bin Ali, Sharif of Mecca abdicated the throne of the Kingdom of Hejaz in October 1924.

When Germany invaded Belgium in 1940, Leopold III, instead of fleeing to London like his Dutch and Norwegian counterparts in a similar predicament, surrendered to the invaders. This made him unpopular both at home and abroad, and after the war, in July 1951, the Belgian government ordered Leopold III to abdicate.

After mass protests against King Farouk of Egypt began on 23 July 1952, the military forced Farouk I to abdicate in favour of his infant son Fuad II during the Egyptian revolution of 1952. Farouk was exiled to Italy. Fuad himself was shortly thereafter deposed and a republic declared.

==== 21st century ====
In recent decades, the monarchs of the Netherlands, Belgium, Luxembourg, Qatar, Cambodia and Bhutan have abdicated either as a result of old age or to pass the throne to the heir sooner.

On 30 April 2013, in the eve of Koninginnesdag Queen Beatrix of the Netherlands abdicated the Dutch throne in favor of her eldest son then Prince of Orange, Willem-Alexander.

In June 2014, Juan Carlos I of Spain abdicated in favour of his son, Felipe VI.

On 14 January 2024, Queen Margrethe II of Denmark abdicated on the 52nd anniversary of her accession to the throne. She was the first Danish monarch to abdicate since King Erik III Lamb in 1146 and the first Scandinavian monarch to abdicate since Queen Ulrika Eleonora of Sweden in 1720.

== See also ==
- List of monarchs who abdicated
- Lists of office-holders
- List of monarchs who lost their thrones in the 20th century
- List of monarchs who lost their thrones in the 21st century
- Papal renunciation
- List of resignations from government – republic equivalent
