= Aziz Qureshi =

Indian politician (1941–2024)

Dr. Aziz Qureshi
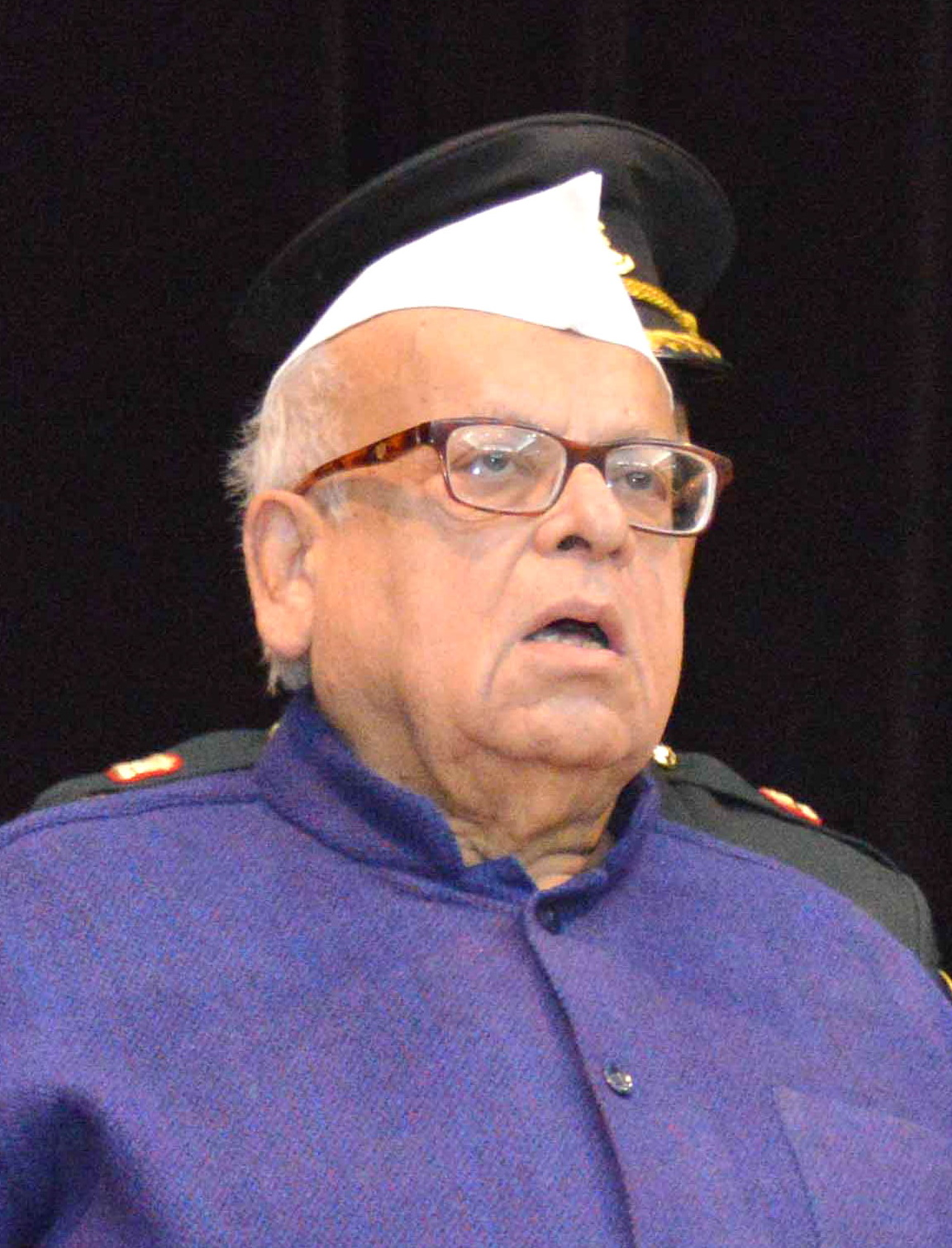
- Qureshi in 2014

Governor of Mizoram
- In office 9 January 2015 – 28 March 2015
- Preceded by: Krishan Kant Paul
- Succeeded by: Keshari Nath Tripathi

Governor of Uttarakhand
- In office 17 May 2012 – 6 January 2015
- Preceded by: Margaret Alva
- Succeeded by: Krishan Kant Paul

Governor of Uttar Pradesh (additional charge)
- In office 17 June – 22 July 2014
- Preceded by: Banwari Lal Joshi
- Succeeded by: Ram Naik

Personal details
- Born: 24 April 1941 Bhopal, Bhopal State, India
- Died: 1 March 2024 (aged 82) Bhopal, Madhya Pradesh, India
- Party: Samajwadi Party (March 2022) , Indian National Congress
- Education: Agra University; Vikram University; Bhopal University
- Profession: Lawyer

Aziz Qureshi (24 April 1941 – 1 March 2024) was an Indian politician and a senior Indian National Congress leader of mixed Arab-Pathan Muslim ethnoreligious and Urdu-speaking linguistic background from Bhopal, Madhya Pradesh.

== Career ==
Qureshi had previously served as 15th governor of Mizoram from January to March 2015. In addition, he also previously served as the governor of Uttarakhand from 2012 to 2015 and was also appointed Governor of Uttar Pradesh (additional charge) for a month in 2014, before Ram Naik took over his position.

Later, he was appointed chairman of the Madhya Pradesh Urdu Academy on 24 January 2020 by the Government of Madhya Pradesh, after leaving the state governorships post.

In 1973, he served as a cabinet minister in Madhya Pradesh and later in 1984, he was elected to Lok Sabha from Satna (Madhya Pradesh) constituency for a term until 1989.

== Contribution towards Muhammad Ali Jauhar University ==
Maulana Ali Jauhar University earlier did not have Minority Status.

In a conversation between Mulyam Singh Yadav and former Governor, the latter commented “ Do you want me to approve the bill related to the University and let one of its doors open in Pakistan? We have already endured the pain of partition by creating Aligarh Muslim University as the university had helped the creation of Pakistan.”

Mulayam Singh passed the essence of the conversation to Azam khan that took place between him and the former Governor of that time. Many witnesses that were present there give details that Azam Khan started crying after hearing this stereotypical approach towards the Muslim Minority. Witness says that Azam Khan prayed to Allah that may Dr. Aziz Qureshi became the Governor of Uttar Pradesh.

On 17 June 2014 Dr Azizi Qureshi became Governor of Uttar Pradesh for five days only. In this short span of time, his secretary got several calls from New Delhi to transfer the files to the Delhi Office. The secretary averted the request and she highlighted that the Governor is currently studying the details of the files.

Officials of the Modi Government try to lure Dr. Qureshi by offering and extending the Governorship for further five more years but Dr. Aziz Qureshi showed strong determination and Character. Dr. Aziz Qureshi signed the Bills which granted the permission of Minority Status to Maulana Ali Jauhar University.

In a public statement once Dr. Qureshi said “They (secular citizens) should save the university by putting their lives at stake and not hesitating to give the last drop of their blood for the cause.

== Death ==
On 1 March 2024, Aziz Qureshi died at a Bhopal hospital after a prolonged illness. He was 82.

Lok Sabha
Preceded by Gulsher Ahmad	Member of Parliament for Satna; 1984–1989	Succeeded by Sukhendra Singh
Government offices
Preceded by Margaret Alva	Governor of Uttarakhand; 15 May 2012 – 7 January 2015	Succeeded by Krishan Kant Paul
Preceded by Banwari Lal Joshi	Governor of Uttar Pradesh (Additional Charge); 17 June – 22 July 2014	Succeeded by Ram Naik
Preceded by Krishan Kant Paul	Governor of Mizoram; 7 January – 28 March 2015	Succeeded by Keshari Nath Tripathi
