= Lok Bhavan, Aizawl =

Residence of the Governor of Mizoram

- Interactive map of the Lok Bhavan, Aizawl area

General information
- Coordinates: 23.723445°N 92.719395°E
- Owner: Government of Mizoram

References
- Website

Lok Bhavan formerly Raj Bhavan (translation: Government House) is the official residence of the governor of Mizoram V.K.Singh. It is located in the capital city of Aizawl, Mizoram.

== Who’s Who ==
=== Secretariat ===
Name	Designation
V Lalsangliana IAS	Secretary to Governor
Joseph Lalrinawma MCS	Addl. Secretary to Governor
Lalngaihzuala MCS	PS to Governor
Saurabh Khamar	OSD to Governor
Malsawmsanga MIS	PRO to Governor
Lalrampari MSS (Steno)	APS-I to Governor
F Herliani MSS (Steno)	PA to Governor
R Lawmthanga MSS	Superintendent

== See also ==
- Government Houses of the British Indian Empire
- List of governors of Mizoram
