= Ashwani Kumar (police officer) =

Governor of Nagaland

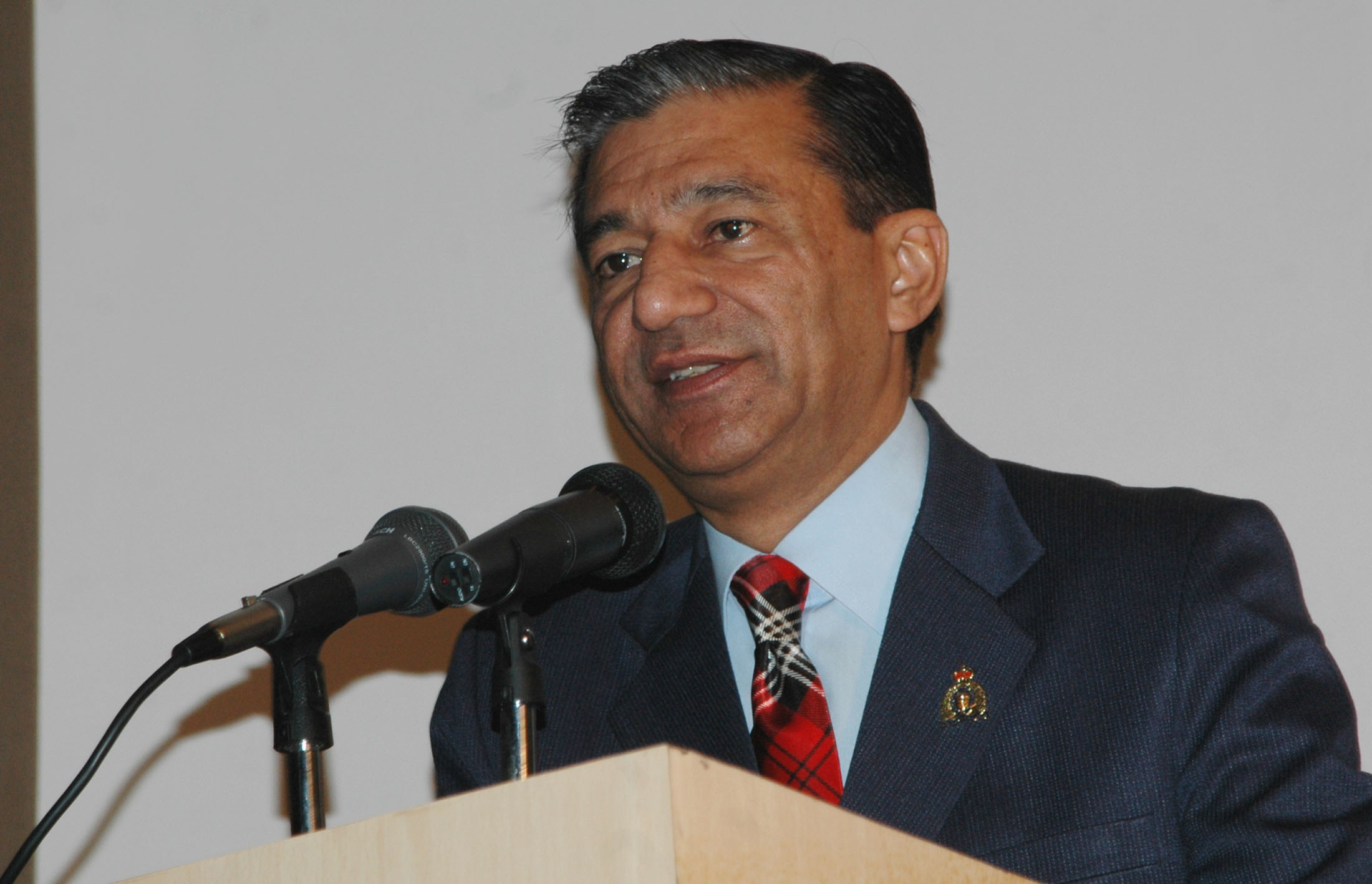
- Kumar in 2009

Governor of Nagaland
- In office 21 March 2013 – 27 June 2014
- Chief Minister: Neiphiu Rio
- Preceded by: Nikhil Kumar
- Succeeded by: Krishan Kant Paul

Governor of Manipur
- In office 29 July 2013 – 23 December 2013
- Chief Minister: Okram Ibobi Singh
- Preceded by: Gurbachan Jagat
- Succeeded by: Vinod Duggal

Director of Central Bureau of Investigation
- In office 2 August 2008 – 30 November 2010
- Preceded by: Vijay Shankar
- Succeeded by: A P Singh

Director General of Police of Himachal Pradesh
- In office August 2006 – July 2008

Personal details
- Born: 15 November 1950 Nahan, Himachal Pradesh, India
- Died: 7 October 2020 (aged 69) Shimla, Himachal Pradesh, India
- Party: Independent
- Spouse: Chandak A. K.
- Children: 1
- Education: Himachal Pradesh University, National Defence College, Rashtriya Indian Military College
- Website: nagaland.nic.in/functionaries/rajbhavan/governor.htm

Ashwani Kumar (15 November 1950 – 7 October 2020) was a 1973-Batch IPS officer who served as Governor of the Indian state of Nagaland, and briefly as Governor of Manipur during 2013.

He was the DGP of Himachal Pradesh from August 2006 – July 2008 and;

He had served the elite Special Protection Group (SPG) as its deputy inspector general when Rajiv Gandhi was Prime Minister of India.

Ashwani handled and or investigated an Amit Shan and Shorabuddin Sheikh investigation.

He was the Director of CBI between 2 August 2008 to 30 November 2010.

Ashwani Kumar died in the evening on the 7 of October 2020 in Brockhurst in Shimla due to suicide by hanging.

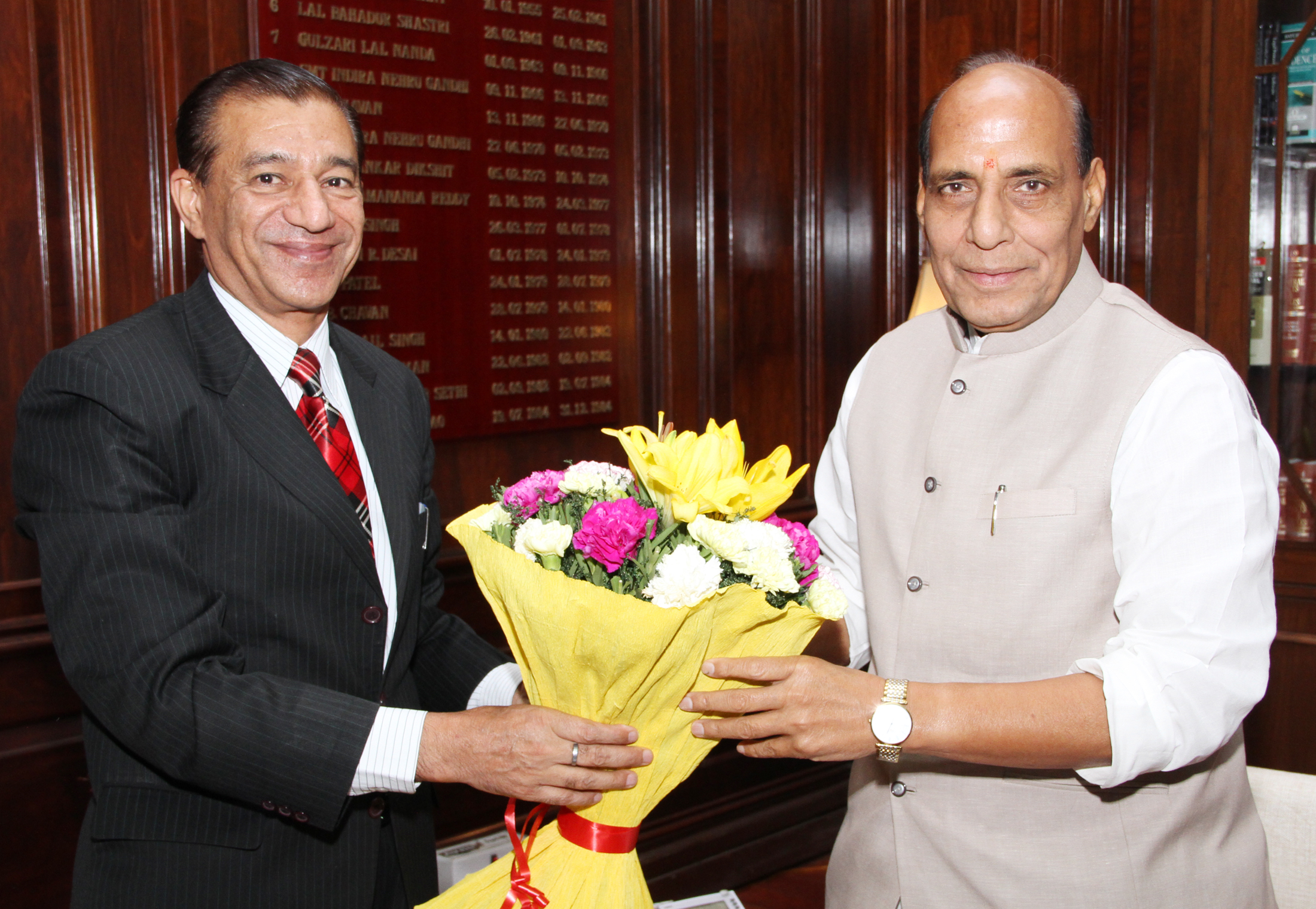
Kumar with Minister of Defence (India) Shri Rajnath Singh in 2014

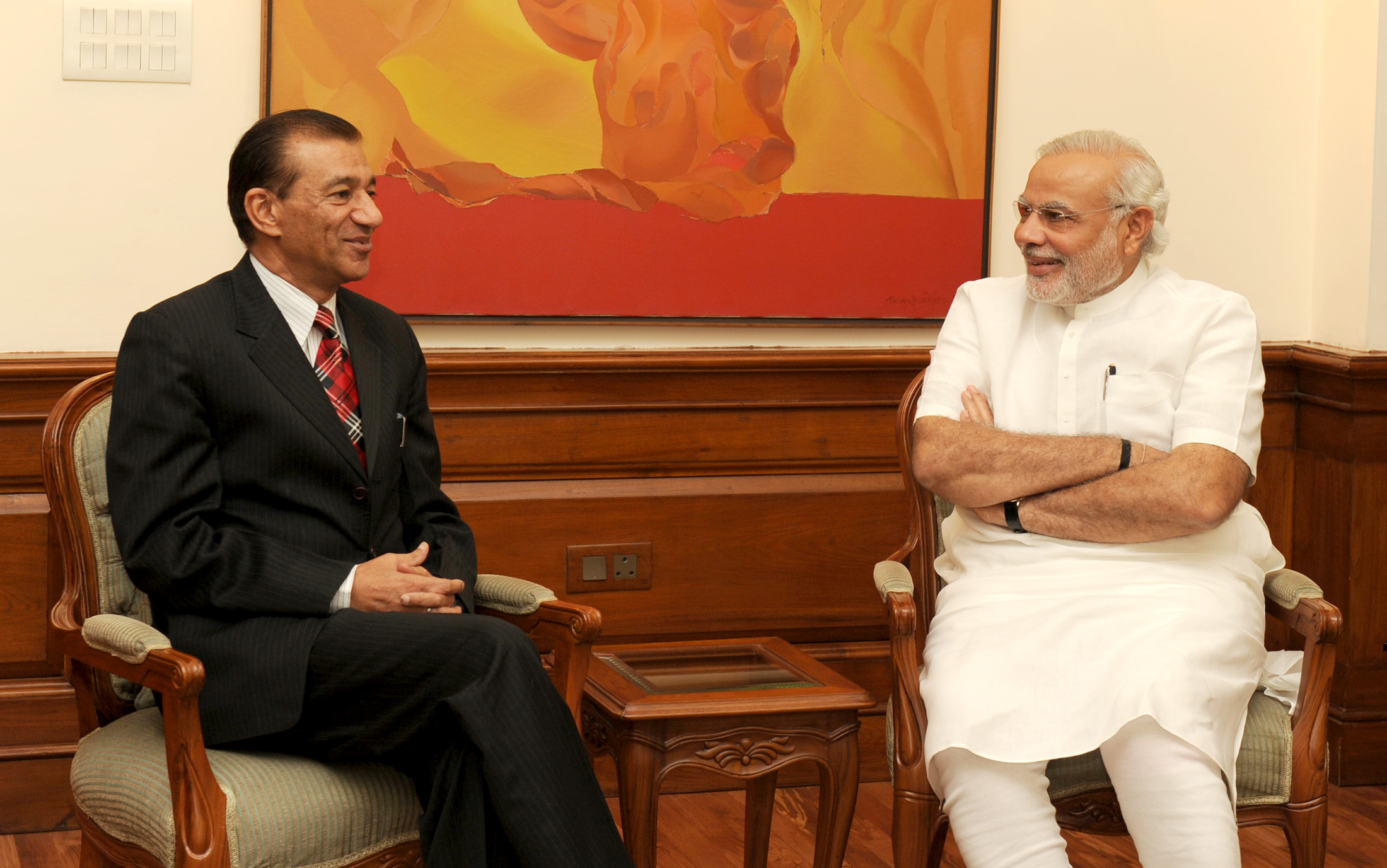
Kumar meets Prime Minister of India Narendra Modi in 2014.

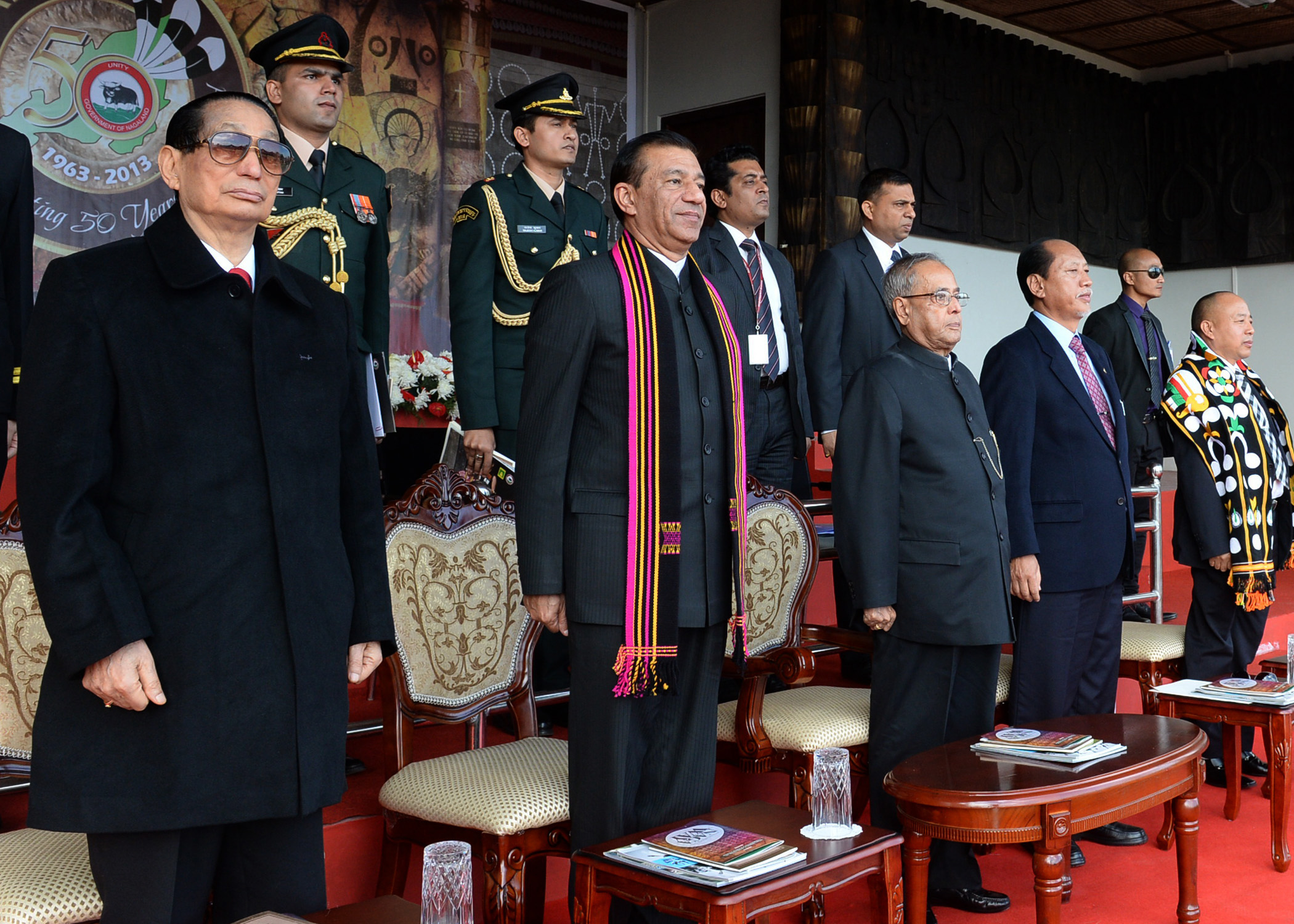
Kumar in Nagaland with former President of India Pranab Mukherjee in 2013

Government offices
Preceded by Nikhil Kumar	Governor of Nagaland; March 2013 – June 2014	Succeeded by Krishan Kant Paul
Preceded by Gurbachan Jagat	Governor of Manipur; July – December 2013	Succeeded by Vinod Duggal
