= Vinod Kumar Duggal =

Indian civil servant

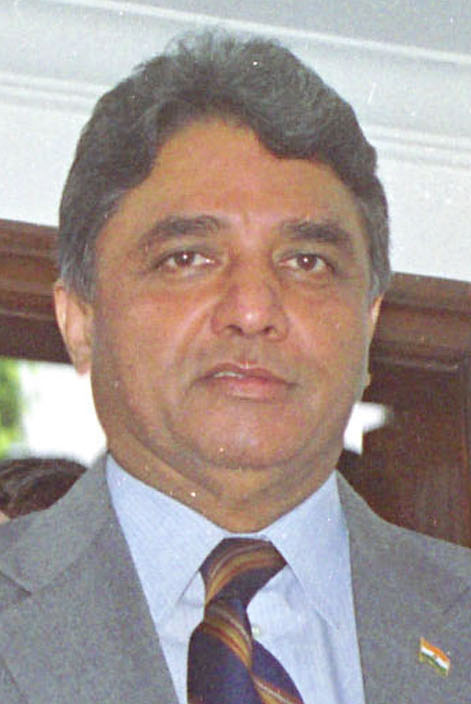
- Duggal in 2005

14th Governor of Manipur
- In office 31 December 2013 – 28 August 2014
- Chief Minister: Okram Ibobi Singh
- Preceded by: Ashwani Kumar
- Succeeded by: Krishan Kant Paul (Additional Charge)

Governor of Mizoram
- Additional Charge
- In office 8 August 2014 – 16 September 2014
- Chief Minister: Lal Thanhawla
- Preceded by: Kamla Beniwal
- Succeeded by: Krishan Kant Paul (Additional Charge)

Home Secretary
- In office March 2005 – 31 March 2007
- Prime Minister: Manmohan Singh
- Preceded by: Dhirendra Singh
- Succeeded by: Madhukar Gupta

Personal details
- Born: 26 November 1944 (age 81) Sialkot, Punjab, British India (Now in Pakistan)
- Occupation: Civil Servant

Vinod Kumar Duggal (born 26 November 1944) is a retired Indian civil servant. Duggal served as Home Secretary in the Government of India from 2005 to 2007 in the government of Manmohan Singh. He belongs to the 1968 batch of IAS. On 23 December 2013 he was appointed governor of Manipur by President Pranab Mukherjee. He was also given the additional responsibility as Governor of Mizoram as the governor Kamla Beniwal was sacked on 8 August 2014.

== Early life ==
Vinod Duggal went to National Defence Academy and later appeared for civil services. He served as a short service commission officer in the Indian Army.

== Career ==
Vinod Duggal also worked as a Secretary, Water Resources, in 2005. In 2009, he was appointed a member-secretary of the Srikrishna committee on Telangana. He served in the Municipal Corporation of Delhi as commissioner between 1996 and 2000. He served as the Sri Krishna Committee member to look into the demand of Telangana state.

He is also a member of the Justice Punchhi Commission on Centre-State relations.
