= List of governors of Mizoram =

Governor of Mizoram, India

Governor of Mizoram
- Lok Bhavan, Aizawl

- Flag of India

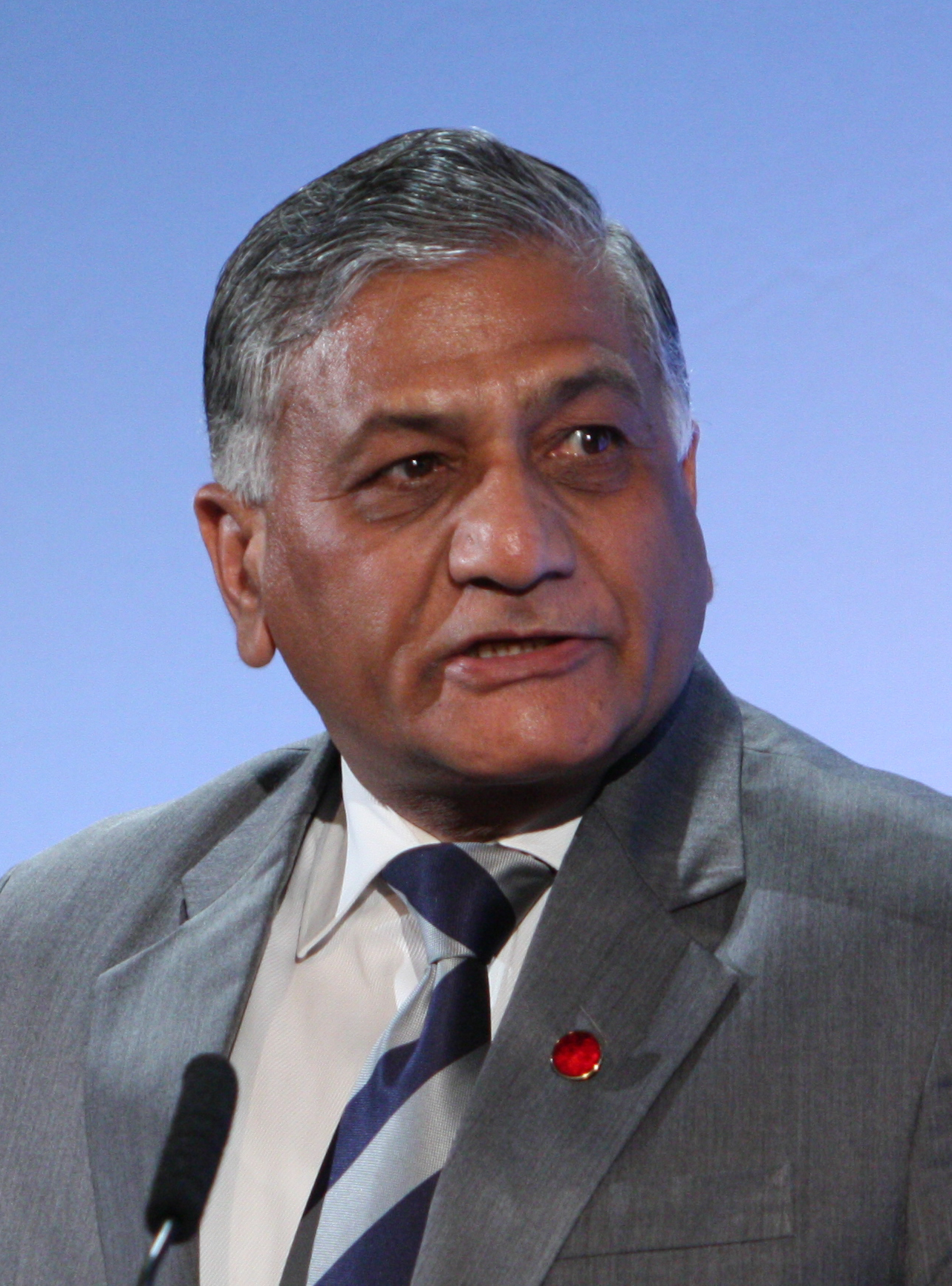
- Incumbent; Vijay Kumar Singh since 16 January 2025
- Style: His Excellency
- Residence: Lok Bhavan, Aizawl
- Appointer: President of India
- Term length: At the pleasure of the president
- Inaugural holder: Hiteswar Saikia
- Formation: 20 February 1987; 39 years ago
- Website: https://rajbhavan.mizoram.gov.in

The state of Mizoram is in northeastern India.

This is a list of governors of Mizoram, an Indian state part of Northeast India. There are 25 governors with additional charge.

== Powers and functions ==
The governor enjoys many different types of powers:

- Executive powers related to administration, appointments and removals,
- Legislative powers related to lawmaking and the state legislature, that is Vidhan Sabha or Vidhan Parishad, and
- Discretionary powers to be carried out according to the discretion of the Governor.

== List of Lieutenant Governors of Mizoram ==
Legend

- ^{†} Died in office
- ^{§} Transferred
- ^{‡} Resigned/removed

S.J.Das was the administrator of Mizoram from 21 January 1972 to 23 April 1972. He was followed by these Lieutenant Governors:

#	Portrait	Name (lifespan)	Home state	Took office	Left Office	Appointer
1		S. P. Mukherjee	Unknown	24 April 1972	12 June 1974	V. V. Giri
2		S. K. Chibber	Unknown	13 June 1974	26 September 1977	V. V. Giri
3		N. P. Mathur	Unknown	27 September 1977	15 April 1981	Neelam S. Reddy
4		S. N. Kohli (1916–1997)	Unknown	16 April 1981	9 August 1983	Neelam S. Reddy
5		H. S. Dubey	Unknown	10 August 1983	10 December 1986	Zail Singh
6		Hiteswar Saikia (1934–1996)	Assam	11 December 1986	19 February 1987	Zail Singh

== Governors of Mizoram ==
Legend

- ^{†} Died in office
- ^{§} Transferred
- ^{‡} Resigned
- ^{@} Removed

Color key

- indicates acting/additional charge/position vacant

#	Portrait	Name (born – died)	Home state	Tenure in office			Appointer (President)
#	Portrait	Name (born – died)	Home state	From	To	Time in office	Appointer (President)
1		Hiteswar Saikia (1934–1996)	Assam	20 February 1987	30 April 1989^{[‡]}	2 years, 69 days	Zail Singh
2		General; K. V. Krishna Rao (Retd); PVSM (1923–2016) (Additional Charge)	Andhra Pradesh	1 May 1989	20 July 1989^{[§]} (Note: Transferred as the Governor of Jammu and Kashmir)	80 days	Ramaswamy Venkataraman
3		Williamson A. Sangma (1919–1990)	Meghalaya	21 July 1989	7 February 1990^{[‡]}	201 days	Ramaswamy Venkataraman
4		Swaraj Kaushal (1952–2025)	Punjab	8 February 1990	9 February 1993	3 years, 1 day	Ramaswamy Venkataraman
5		Paty Ripple Kyndiah (1928–2015)	Meghalaya	10 February 1993	13 January 1998^{[‡]} (Note: Resigned to contest in the 1998 general election)	4 years, 337 days	K. R. Narayanan
6		Siddheshwar Prasad (1929–2023) (Additional Charge)	Bihar	14 January 1998	28 January 1998	14 days	K. R. Narayanan
7		Arun Prasad Mukherjee (1933–2020); IPS (Retd)	West Bengal	29 January 1998	1 May 1998^{[‡]}	92 days	K. R. Narayanan
8		A. Padmanabhan; IAS (Retd) (born 1928)	Tamil Nadu	2 May 1998	30 November 2000^{[‡]}	2 years, 212 days	K. R. Narayanan
9		Ved Marwah; IPS (Retd) (1934–2020) (Additional Charge)	National Capital Territory of Delhi	1 December 2000	17 May 2001	167 days	K. R. Narayanan
10		Amolak Rattan Kohli (born 1942)	Haryana	18 May 2001	24 July 2006	5 years, 67 days	K. R. Narayanan
11		Lieutenant General; Madan Mohan Lakhera (Retd); PVSM AVSM VSM (1937–2026)	Uttarakhand	25 July 2006	1 September 2011	5 years, 38 days	A. P. J. Abdul Kalam
12		Vakkom Purushothaman (1928–2023)	Kerala	2 September 2011	9 July 2014^{[‡]}	2 years, 310 days	Pratibha Patil
13		Kamla Beniwal (1927–2024)	Rajasthan	9 July 2014	7 August 2014^{[@]}	29 days	Pranab Mukherjee
14		Vinod Kumar Duggal; IAS (Retd) (born 1944) (Additional Charge)	Punjab	8 August 2014	16 September 2014^{[‡]}	39 days	Pranab Mukherjee
15		Krishan Kant Paul; IPS (Retd) (born 1948) (Additional Charge)	Chandigarh	16 September 2014	8 January 2015^{[§]} (Note: Transferred as the Governor of Uttarakhand)	114 days	Pranab Mukherjee
16		Aziz Qureshi (1941–2024)	Madhya Pradesh	9 January 2015	3 April 2015^{[@]}	84 days	Pranab Mukherjee
17		Keshari Nath Tripathi (1934–2023) (Additional Charge)	Uttar Pradesh	4 April 2015	25 May 2015	51 days	Pranab Mukherjee
18		Lieutenant General; Nirbhay Sharma (Retd); PVSM UYSM AVSM VSM (born 1946)	Uttar Pradesh	26 May 2015	26 May 2018	3 years, 0 days	Pranab Mukherjee
–		Vacant	–	26 May 2018	29 May 2018	3 days	–
19		Kummanam Rajasekharan (born 1952)	Kerala	29 May 2018	8 March 2019^{[‡]} (Note: Resigned to contest in the 2019 general election)	283 days	Ram Nath Kovind
20		Jagdish Mukhi (born 1942) (Additional Charge)	National Capital Territory of Delhi	9 March 2019	4 November 2019	240 days	Ram Nath Kovind
21		P. S. Sreedharan Pillai (born 1954)	Kerala	5 November 2019	18 July 2021^{[§]} (Note: Transferred as the Governor of Goa)	1 year, 255 days	Ram Nath Kovind
22		Kambhampati Hari Babu (born 1953)	Andhra Pradesh	19 July 2021	10 August 2021	22 days	Ram Nath Kovind
23		Brigadier; B. D. Mishra (Retd) (born 1939) (Acting)	Uttar Pradesh	11 August 2021	6 November 2021	87 days	Ram Nath Kovind
24		Kambhampati Hari Babu (born 1953)	Andhra Pradesh	7 November 2021	30 September 2024	2 years, 328 days	Ram Nath Kovind
25		Indrasena Reddy (born 1953) (Acting)	Telangana	30 September 2024	9 October 2024	9 days	Droupadi Murmu
26		Kambhampati Hari Babu (born 1953)	Andhra Pradesh	9 October 2024	16 January 2025^{[§]} (Note: Transferred as the Governor of Odisha)	99 days	Droupadi Murmu
27		General; Vijay Kumar Singh (Retd); PVSM AVSM YSM ADC (born 1951)	Uttar Pradesh	16 January 2025	Incumbent	1 year, 270 days	Droupadi Murmu

== Oath ==
“Keimah, [Hming], hian Pathian hmingin chhe ka chham a / tak hmetin ka sawi a, ka thinlung zawng zawngin ka tiam a, rinawm takin Mizoram Governor mawhphurhna ka hlen ang a, theihtawp chhuahin India Dan Pui (Constitution) leh dante ka humhalhhin, ka venghing, ka chhandam ang a, tin, Mizoram mipui rawngbawl nan leh an paratna atan ka inpumpek ang."

== See also ==
- Governors of India
- Chief Minister of Mizoram
