= Krishan Kant Paul =

Indian police service officer (born 1948)

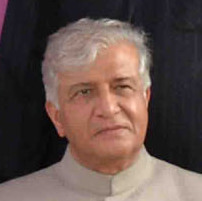

6th Governor of Uttarakhand
- In office 8 January 2015 – 21 August 2018
- Chief Minister: Harish Rawat; Trivendra Singh Rawat
- Preceded by: Aziz Qureshi
- Succeeded by: Baby Rani Maurya

13th Governor of Meghalaya
- In office 1 July 2013 – 6 January 2015
- Chief Minister: Mukul Sangma
- Preceded by: Ranjit Shekhar Mooshahary
- Succeeded by: Keshari Nath Tripathi

Governor of Manipur
- Additional Charge
- In office 16 September 2014 – 15 May 2015
- Chief Minister: Okram Ibobi Singh
- Preceded by: Vinod Duggal
- Succeeded by: Syed Ahmed

Governor of Mizoram
- Additional Charge
- In office 16 September 2014 – 8 January 2015
- Chief Minister: Lal Thanhawla
- Preceded by: Vinod Kumar Duggal (additional charge)
- Succeeded by: Aziz Qureshi

Governor of Nagaland
- Additional Charge
- In office 2 July 2014 – 19 July 2014
- Chief Minister: T. R. Zeliang
- Preceded by: Ashwani Kumar
- Succeeded by: Padmanabha Acharya

Police Commissioner of Delhi
- In office Feb 2004 – July 2007
- Preceded by: R. S. Gupta
- Succeeded by: Y. S. Dadwal

Personal details
- Born: 6 February 1948 (age 78)
- Spouse: Omita Paul
- Education: Panjab University, Chandigarh

Krishan Kant Paul (born 6 February 1948) is a former Indian Police Service officer, who served as the Commissioner of Police, Delhi from February 2004 to July 2007. Following his retirement from the IPS, he served as the governor of several states—Meghalaya (2013–15), Manipur (2014-15) and Uttarakhand (2015–18). He had also held the governorships of Mizoram and Nagaland briefly, as additional charges.

== Early life and background ==
Paul was born on 6 February 1948. He did his post-graduation (Master of Science) in Chemistry from Punjab University, Chandigarh. This was followed by his Ph.D. thesis in fluorine chemistry, which was highly commended and resulted in 15 research publications of a technical nature, in international scientific journals of repute.

== Career ==
=== As an IPS officer ===
Paul has experience working in the Intelligence Bureau (IB) and the Research and Analysis Wing (RAW). He was the longest serving Police Commissioner of Delhi from February 2004 to July 2007.

=== As a member of UPSC ===
After retiring from police service, Paul became a member of the Union Public Service Commission, New Delhi on 26 July 2007. He served there until July 2013.

=== As the Governor of states ===
On 2 July 2013, Paul was appointed the new Governor of Meghalaya. He joined on 8 July 2013. On 2 July 2014, he was sworn in as Governor of Nagaland. He was given the additional charge as the Governor of Nagaland.

On 16 September 2014, Paul was sworn in as the Governor of Mizoram. Mizoram was assigned to him as additional charge. On 17 September 2014, he was sworn in as the Governor of Manipur. Manipur was assigned to him as an additional charge.

Paul was sworn in as the 6th Governor of Uttarakhand on 8 January 2015 replacing Aziz Qureshi, who was sent to take charge as the new Governor of Mizoram. This challenged Narendra Modi's government's attempts to make Governors appointed during the UPA regime resign.

== Personal life ==
Paul is married to Omita Paul, a former Indian Information Service officer, who was posted as secretary to former President Pranab Mukherjee, having worked with him, in different capacities since the 1980s.

Political offices
Preceded by Ranjit Shekhar Mooshahary	Governor of Meghalaya; 1 July 2013 – 6 January 2015	Succeeded by Keshari Nath Tripathi
Preceded by Ashwani Kumar	Governor of Nagaland; 2 July 2014 – 19 July 2014	Succeeded by Padmanabha Acharya
Preceded by Vinod Kumar Duggal	Governor of Mizoram; 16 September 2014 – 8 January 2015	Succeeded by Aziz Qureshi
Preceded by Vinod Kumar Duggal	Governor of Manipur; 16 September 2014 – 15 May 2015	Succeeded by Syed Ahmed
Preceded by Aziz Qureshi	Governor of Uttarakhand; 8 January 2015 – 26 August 2018	Succeeded by Baby Rani Maurya
