= S. A. Rawoof =

Indian communist politician (1924–2014)

- Born: Sheik Abdul Rawoof; 1924
- Died: 9 February 2014 (aged 89–90); Bangalore, Karnataka India

Sheik Abdul Rawoof (1924 – 9 February 2014) was an Indian communist leader from Andhra Pradesh. He was known by the nom de guerre "Viswam" or by his initials "SAR". He was a senior cadre of the Communist Party of India (Marxist–Leninist) in Andhra Pradesh, and, as an ideological hardliner, went on to lead his faction after the CPI(ML) disintegrated. He served as the secretary of the Communist Party of India (Marxist–Leninist) Naxalbari from 1998 to 2006. He was sentenced to life imprisonment in connection with different criminal cases and spent a total of 12 years in jail.

== Youth ==
Born in 1924, Rawoof hailed from a middle-class Muslim family in Kutagulla village, Kadiri taluk, Anantapur district, in present-day Andhra Pradesh. He attended Kadiri High School and later obtained a Bachelor of Arts degree from Anantapur College. During his college years, he became a sympathiser of the Communist Party of India, influenced by the Telangana armed struggle, and subsequently became a party member.

Rawoof worked as a teacher at Kadiri Vemana Board School for a period. He studied law in Madanapalle, Chittoor district, and obtained his law degree in 1964. He initially worked as an assistant to a lawyer in Madanapalle before practising law in Anantapur district.

== Party leader in Kadiri taluk ==
Rawoof contested local elections and became the first communist municipal chairman of Kadiri. As municipal chairman, one of his first actions was to cancel the housing tax for poor and middle-class residents. He worked closely with local communist leader Nizamvali.

During the 1964 split in the Communist Party of India, Rawoof sided with the Communist Party of India (Marxist) (CPI(M)). As a local leader of the CPI, and later the CPI(M), he was involved in mass organisation work in the Kadiri taluk area. In 1965, he was arrested under the Preventive Detention Act. Among his fellow prisoners at the Secunderabad District Jail were state-level CPI(M) leaders in Andhra Pradesh, such as T. Nagi Reddy and Chandra Pulla Reddy. They conducted political classes in the jail, which included critiques of the CPI(M)'s political line. While at Secunderabad District Jail, Rawoof, who until then had been a local-level leader, was exposed to political struggles beyond his home region.

Rawoof stood as the CPI(M) candidate for the Kadiri constituency in the 1967 Andhra Pradesh Legislative Assembly election. He finished second in the constituency, securing 9,138 votes (21.20%).

== Naxalbari uprising ==
As the CPI(M) was undergoing internal divisions, the Kadiri party unit was dissolved, and its cadres joined T. Nagi Reddy's Andhra Pradesh Coordination Committee of Communist Revolutionaries (APCCCR) en masse. Around this time, Rawoof met two Rayalaseema-level leaders, Mahadevan and C. K. Narayana Reddy, who informed him that T. Nagi Reddy was rejecting Charu Mazumdar's line on issues such as armed struggle, election boycotts, and underground party organisation. They advised Rawoof to organise his group independently, which he, along with others, began to do. In February 1969, the APCCCR was expelled from the All India Coordination Committee of Communist Revolutionaries (AICCCR). Rawoof was invited to the 28 February 1969 Guttikonda Bilam meeting, at which the new Andhra Pradesh AICCCR unit was to be organised, but was unable to attend.

He attended a state-level meeting of the AICCCR in Visakhapatnam from 14 to 16 May 1969 as a special invitee. Rawoof subsequently joined the AICCCR and became a member of its Andhra Pradesh State Committee. Shortly thereafter, he was arrested and detained in Visakhapatnam Jail under the Preventive Detention Act. While in jail, he met Adibhatla Kailasam, Nagbhushan Patnaik, Dr. Mallik, and several Girijan revolutionaries from the Srikakulam armed struggle. He was released after a few days.

Rawoof participated in the founding of the Communist Party of India (Marxist–Leninist) (CPI(ML)) on 22 April 1969. Following party instructions, he abandoned his legal career. Later in 1969, CPI(ML) Andhra Pradesh State Secretary Chaudhuri Tejeswar Rao convened a meeting of cadres from Anantapur district, presenting the experiences of the Naxalbari uprising, Mazumdar's positions, and instructions to organise armed squads and initiate militant actions in the area. Preparations were made for actions in the Erramala region, but the plan was suspended. In early January 1970, Mahadevan convened the Rayalaseema Regional Committee of the party, which finalised plans for armed actions in Anantapur, Nellore, and Chittoor districts. On 17 January 1970, around forty cadres participated in the attacks. Following these events, Rawoof and six others went underground.

He attended the CPI(ML) Andhra Pradesh state conference in Mysore from 28 March to 2 April 1970, where he was elected to the nine-member State Committee of the party. Rawoof was elected as a delegate to the CPI(ML) party congress scheduled to be held in Calcutta on 16 May 1970 but was unable to attend due to logistical constraints.

Rawoof was one of four people to attend a CPI(ML) Central Committee meeting in Calcutta in June 1972, alongside Charu Mazumdar, fellow Andhra Pradesh leader K. G. Sathyamurthy, and Jagjit Singh Sohal from Punjab. Years later, Rawoof recalled that Mazumdar had expressed self-criticism, referring to the critique from the Communist Party of China on the slogan "China's Chairman is Our Chairman" and the policy of annihilations.

Following the arrest and death of Mazumdar, the CPI(ML) disintegrated. Rawoof aligned himself with the Central Organising Committee, Communist Party of India (Marxist–Leninist) (COC, CPI(ML)), and served as a member of its Andhra Pradesh Provincial Committee (state committee).

== Jail ==
In March 1973, Rawoof travelled to West Bengal with another person to establish contact with cadres who supported the Mazumdar line. On the night of their arrival, they were arrested at their hotel in Howrah. After spending ten days in police custody, Rawoof was transferred to a jail in Andhra Pradesh.

While imprisoned, COC, CPI(ML) leader Kondapalli Seetharamaiah wrote a self-critical report in 1974, calling for greater attention to mass organisations and mass movements. The report provoked strong reactions among other revolutionary prisoners, some of whom broke away from the party. Although Rawoof was critical of Seetharamaiah's position, he remained in the party at that time.

Following his conviction and life sentence in the Parvathipuram conspiracy case, Rawoof was sent back to West Bengal to face trial in the Alipore conspiracy case (also known historically as the Alipur conspiracy case), along with Kanu Sanyal and Souren Bose. He was imprisoned in the Presidency Jail, often kept alone in a single cell. After the Emergency ended, he was moved to a barrack where he stayed with other imprisoned revolutionaries.

At a court hearing in Calcutta, held after the 1977 Indian general election, Rawoof reaffirmed his loyalty to Mazumdar, argued against expecting change under the new government in Delhi, and called for the continuation of the armed struggle. Following the 1977 West Bengal Legislative Assembly election, the Left Front state government withdrew cases against Naxalites, including the Alipore conspiracy case against Rawoof. He was then transferred to the Rajahmundry Central Prison, and later to the Secunderabad Jail at his own request.

== APROC ==
In 1976, the Andhra Pradesh Provincial Committee broke away from the COC, CPI(ML). In 1977, after a period of reflection, Rawoof parted ways with the organisation in opposition to the new tactical orientation outlined in its "August Resolution", which called for a temporary suspension of armed struggle. Kondapalli Seetharamaiah argued that such a suspension was necessary in light of the opportunities that had arisen after the withdrawal of the Emergency. Rawoof described the August Resolution as "revisionist" and attempted to contact Seetharamaiah from jail to present his views. Revolutionary prisoners were divided between supporters and opponents of the Andhra Pradesh Provincial Committee.

After breaking with the Andhra Pradesh Provincial Committee, Rawoof formed his own party in Andhra Pradesh, the Andhra Pradesh Reorganising Committee, CPI(ML) (APROC). APROC denounced the new leadership of the Communist Party of China under Deng Xiaoping, the Three Worlds Theory, and the line of the Party of Labour of Albania. It reaffirmed the "Charu Mazumdar proletarian revolutionary line", advocated the boycott of elections, and organised armed activities in Nalgonda and Warangal districts. An APROC armed forest squad operated in Warangal district.

== CRC, CPI(ML) ==
While in jail, Rawoof read copies of the publication Mass Line issued from Kerala. He instructed cadres to meet the Kerala group led by K. Venu and K. N. Ramachandran. In 1979, Rawoof's Andhra Pradesh Reorganising Committee, CPI(ML) (APROC) and K. Venu's CPI(ML) Kerala State Committee merged to form the Reorganisation Committee, CPI(ML), which was later renamed the Central Reorganisation Committee, Communist Party of India (Marxist–Leninist) (CRC, CPI(ML)). The central leadership consisted of K. Venu, K. N. Ramachandran, and Rawoof.

Rawoof organised student movements under the name Radical Students Union, youth movements, peasant movements, and armed struggle activities. His group carried out attacks on police stations and landlords. The organisation's geographic influence expanded to Khammam, Karimnagar, Adilabad, Anantapur, and Nellore districts. An armed forest squad operated in the Asifabad area of Adilabad district. The CRC, CPI(ML) became known for "some notoriously brutal and sensational killings". Rawoof's group was targeted by state forces and suffered heavy losses. Within a few years, around 40 members of APROC/CRC, CPI(ML) were killed, and the organisation was considerably weakened.

Rawoof disagreed with the tactical line adopted by the All India Conference of CRC, CPI(ML), held in January 1982 in Maharashtra. Following the conference, he wrote an article in Mass Line titled "Dare to think, dare to struggle", advocating the development of armed struggle. The CRC, CPI(ML) leadership adopted the slogan "Fight against dogmatism and fight against secretism", moving away from armed struggle and underground party organisation. The Kerala State Committee of CRC, CPI(ML) later adopted an analysis that class relations in India had changed, that feudalism no longer constituted the social base of imperialism, and that capitalist development was taking place in the country. Rawoof opposed these positions within the CRC, CPI(ML).

== Imprisoned again ==
Rawoof was arrested by police in Hyderabad on 10 March 1983. He was detained at Warangal Central Jail, charged in three cases related to crimes committed in Warangal district in 1981: conspiracy to commit the murder of Narayana Reddy of Upparigudem in Mahbubabad taluk; conspiracy to commit the murder of another Narayana Reddy from Odedu in Chityal taluk; and a criminal case under the Explosive Substances Act. The latter case concerned an incident in Wardhannapet taluk, when a clandestine meeting led by Rawoof was raided by police forces, and the participants threw bombs at the police while fleeing.

Rawoof was released on bail in the three Warangal cases on 4 December 1983. However, police awaited him outside the jail gates and immediately detained him. He was served a National Security Act warrant dated 5 December 1983. Moreover, on 3 December 1983, a day before his release on bail, Rawoof and 21 others were sentenced to life imprisonment in the case concerning the murder of Narayana Reddy of Upparigudem. Following a prisoners' protest at Warangal Central Jail, Rawoof was transferred as punishment to Visakhapatnam Central Prison.

Ahead of a 1985 CRC, CPI(ML) plenum, Rawoof authored a document from jail outlining his critiques against the emerging line of the party. The Andhra Pradesh State Committee approved the document, but it was rejected by the plenum. Instead, the marathon plenum discarded the 1970 CPI(ML) line as outdated and emphasised the importance of national struggles. The Andhra Pradesh delegation left the plenum in protest and broke away from CRC, CPI(ML). Rawoof renounced his affiliation with the CRC, CPI(ML) in opposition to the organisation's new political line. The Andhra Pradesh group continued armed activities after the split.

On 3 April 1986, the High Court acquitted Rawoof and 12 others in the case concerning the murder of Narayana Reddy of Upparigudem. By then, Rawoof had already been acquitted in the two other Warangal cases. However, before his release, on 4 April 1986, Warangal police appeared at Visakhapatnam Central Prison with a court warrant for another murder case. According to the warrant, Rawoof had conspired with visitors at Warangal Central Jail to commit a murder in Regondla in Parkal taluk in August 1985. The police returned Rawoof to Warangal Central Jail. He was granted bail by the court on 27 May 1986. He would be imprisoned again in another case.

By the late 1980s, Rawoof's group in Andhra Pradesh was largely defunct, with many of its cadres either imprisoned or killed.

== CPI(ML) Red Flag ==
In 1987–1988, the CRC, CPI(ML) experienced a split, with a significant section of the party in Kerala under the leadership of K. N. Ramachandran forming the Communist Party of India (Marxist–Leninist) Red Flag. After some hesitation and following persuasion by CPI(ML) Red Flag cadres from West Bengal and Madhya Pradesh, Rawoof joined the CPI(ML) Red Flag in late 1989, as it upheld the 1970 CPI(ML) programme. He remained a member of its Central Committee until 1998.

A Telugu language mass journal of the party, Erupu ('Red'), was launched as the organ of the Andhra Pradesh party unit. The journal advocated the Charu Mazumdar line, promoting armed struggle and election boycott. Armed activities continued in Anantapur and Nellore districts, as well as in Telangana, during which 12 party members were killed.

In 1996, the entire membership of the CPI(ML) Red Flag Andhra Pradesh State Committee and its armed squad were killed in an encounter, bringing the party to near collapse in the state. At the CPI(ML) Red Flag fourth All India conference held in Kerala in 1997, the Karnataka and Andhra Pradesh delegations found themselves in the minority during debates on the party’s political line.

== CPI(ML) Naxalbari ==
Rawoof was expelled from CPI(ML) Red Flag on 1 October 1998. He then organised a new party, the Communist Party of India (Marxist–Leninist) Naxalbari, based on the Andhra Pradesh and Karnataka state units of CPI(ML) Red Flag. CPI(ML) Naxalbari established contact with the Maoist Unity Centre, CPI(ML) (the remnants of the former CRC, CPI(ML)), which subsequently merged into CPI(ML) Naxalbari in 1999. Rawoof served as the secretary of CPI(ML) Naxalbari.

== Later years ==
Rawoof resigned from his position as secretary of CPI(ML) Naxalbari in 2006. Kannamballi Murali ('Ajith') succeeded him as party secretary.

Rawoof never married. He spent his later years living in a simple hut in Kutagulla village. In old age, he suffered from ill health and spent several years in hospital towards the end of his life.

He died at a hospital in Bengaluru on 9 February 2014, aged 89. His body was kept for public viewing for two days at the Kutagulla Municipal School. Thousands of people paid their respects before his funeral. Manda Krishna Madiga, founder president of the Madiga Reservation Porata Samiti (MRPS), who knew Rawoof from Warangal Jail, visited the wake to pay tribute and offered a red cloth. Rawoof was cremated in Kutagulla. Reportedly, funeral attendees included poets Varavara Rao and Gaddar, MLA Bhumana Karunakar Reddy, and MLC Jupudi Prabhakar Rao.

== Memorial ==
A memorial monument dedicated to S. A. Rawoof was erected in Kutagulla by the S. A. Rawoof Memorial Trust. It was inaugurated by the Trust's president, Vadlamudi Krishna Rao, on 9 February 2015. Annual commemorations are held at the monument on Rawoof's death anniversary, 9 February, organised by the S. A. Rawoof Memorial Trust. A colony located along the Kadiri-Kutagulla Anantapur National Highway has been named after him.
