= Moni Guha =

Indian communist (1914–2009)

Moni Guha (Bengali: মনি গুহ; 29 September 1914 in Madaripur – 7 April 2009 in Kolkata) was an Indian communist.

He was born to a Bengali lower-middle-class family whose economic circumstances did not allow him to complete his school education. Guha joined the struggle for Indian independence, and became an activist of Anushilan Samiti in Faridpur. He was jailed because of his political activities. In prison he met communist leaders, and in the 1940s he became a member of the Communist Party of India.

In the latter part of his life, Guha was accorded pension as a freedom fighter.

== Communist party ==
Guha moved to Calcutta in 1947. He had close contacts with party leaders such as Muzaffar Ahmed and Abdul Halim. He was also active in the Tebhaga movement, and was again imprisoned for a period. After being released from jail he was a trade union organiser amongst factory workers in Calcutta.

He sharply criticized the new line adopted at the 20th Congress of the Communist Party of the Soviet Union, and published a pamphlet with his views (which he handed out to delegates at the 1958 congress of the Communist Party of India). Guha, who had condemned the 20th congress within weeks of its holding, was one of the first anti-revionist dissidents in the international communist movement. Subsequently, Guha was expelled from the Communist Party of India.

== UCCRI(ML) ==
UCCRI(ML)

People
T. Nagi Reddy
Moni Guha
Shamsher Singh Sheri

Mass organisations
Wahikar Union

Predecessors
APCCCR
RCUC(ML)
PCRC

Splinter groups and
successor organisations
Sohi faction
Ajmer faction
DV faction
CCRI
CPI(ML) Janashakti

Related subjects
Communism
MLMTT

Communism Portal

In the early 1970s, Guha, Sunil Sen Gupta, and Shanti Rai founded the West Bengal Co-ordination Committee of Revolutionaries (WBCCR). He also became joint editor of Proletarian Path, along with D.V. Rao.

In 1975 he took part in the founding of the Unity Centre of Communist Revolutionaries of India (Marxist–Leninist) (UCCRI(ML)) and became one of the five Central Committee members of the new party. In 1976 UCCRI(ML) was divided, and Guha was elected general secretary of one of the two UCCRI(ML) factions (the other being led by D.V. Rao). During his days as a UCCRI(ML) leader, Guha went underground. His party nom-de-guerre was Nakul.

In 1978 Guha split with the UCCRI(ML) and left the underground. In the same year he took part in the founding of the India-Albania Friendship Association.

== Political views ==
Guha denounced the post-1956 line of the Communist Party of the Soviet Union as 'revisionist'. He argued that it had its roots in bourgeois nationalism and could be traced to Titoism. After 1969, Guha was a proponent of Marxism-Leninism-Mao Zedong Thought and New Democratic Revolution. After breaking with UCCRI(ML) in 1978, Guha formulated a position that India had become a capitalist country and was thus ripe for socialist revolution. He also came to characterise the Chinese Communist Party and its Three Worlds Theory as 'revisionist'. His viewpoints were elaborated in his work Revisionism against Revisionism.
