= Wahikar Union =

UCCRI(ML)

People
T. Nagi Reddy
Moni Guha
Shamsher Singh Sheri

Mass organisations
Wahikar Union

Predecessors
APCCCR
RCUC(ML)
PCRC

Splinter groups and
successor organisations
Sohi faction
Ajmer faction
DV faction
CCRI
CPI(ML) Janashakti

Related subjects
Communism
MLMTT

Communism Portal

The Wahikar Union was a peasants organization in Punjab, India. It was founded in the mid-1970s and functioned as a mass organization of the Punjab Communist Revolutionary Committee (later the UCCRI(ML)).

The Wahikar Union organized a militant mass protest in Jagraon in 1974. Police opened fire on the demonstration, killing one peasant. Later in the same year, on 26 November, an armed demonstration was organized jointly in Bhatinda by Wahikar Union, Punjab Students Union and Bharat Naujavan Sabha. The rally was dispersed by police forces. Several leaders of the protest were arrested.

By 1982 the Wahikar Union had become defunct.
