= Unity Centre of Communist Revolutionaries of India (Marxist–Leninist) (Ajmer group) =

Communist organisation in India

UCCRI(ML)

People
T. Nagi Reddy
Moni Guha
Shamsher Singh Sheri

Mass organisations
Wahikar Union

Predecessors
APCCCR
RCUC(ML)
PCRC

Splinter groups and
successor organisations
Sohi faction
Ajmer faction
DV faction
CCRI
CPI(ML) Janashakti

Related subjects
Communism
MLMTT

Communism Portal

The Unity Centre of Communist Revolutionaries of India (Marxist–Leninist) (Ajmer group) was a communist organisation in India, which emerged from a split in the Unity Centre of Communist Revolutionaries of India (Marxist-Leninist) (Harbhajan Sohi) in 1982.

== See also ==
- List of Naxalite and Maoist groups in India
