= Shanti Munda =

Indian communist and revolutionary leader

Darjeeling district committee member of the CPI(ML)
- In office 1969–1971

Darjeeling district committee member of CPI(M)
- In office 1964–1967

Personal details
- Born: 1942 (age 83–84)
- Party: Communist Party of India (Marxist-Leninist)
- Criminal charge: Criminal conspiracy

Shanti Munda is an Indian communist and revolutionary leader. She is currently one of the last surviving rebels of the Naxalbari movement. Shanti Munda is remembered as a prominent female leader within this movement who worked alongside significant Communist Party of India (Marxist) leaders including Kanu Sanyal. Her experience as the daughter of a poor peasant exposed her to the exploitation and oppression of the Indian peasantry and inspired a life of active resistance. After Naxalbari uprising, She joined Communist Party of India (Marxist-Leninist).

== Biography ==
=== Family ===
Shanti Munda was born in Hatighisa, as a member of the Munda tribe in the Darjeeling district of India. Although there is no reliable record of her birth date, during a 2017 interview Munda stated that she believed she was in her 74th year of life. Munda was born to a poor peasant family and lived with her mother, father, brother, and sister. Her family owned 18 bighas of land. Under Indian laws at that time, peasants were forced to pay a large portion of their cultivations to the jotedar's. The payment that Indian peasants paid to land owners was dependent on the size of the land they were farming. Munda's father worked on 14 bighas and would pay the jotedars 18 maunds (equivalent to around 27 kg) of paddy.

=== Political exposure ===
Due to the economic stagnation felt by her family due to harsh Indian land laws, Munda's father was unable to fully feed and support his family and was forced to work on Khyapachand Biswas's land as a share cropper. This was not uncommon, as sharecroppers like her father usually worked 2-3 job in order to support their families. Munda's father also has a history of involvement in Indian government. Beginning as a volunteer of the Indian National Congress, he later became a follower of Kanu Sanyal after Sanyal initiated frequent visits to their villages. Sanyal worked with Kesab Sarkar to establish a night school in the surrounding area. It was there that Munda eventually became a student and began forming important relationships with prominent Indian Communist leaders. Munda recently described her early political year in a recent 2017 interview:

“It is a tale that goes back half-a-century. I was then a girl of 12 or 13 years. I was connected with the undivided Communist Party from that age. I Became a member of the women's association. I accompanied women leaders like Chaya Dey, Chaitannya Sanyasi’s wife, Kalu Doctor and Leela Majumdar to Champashari and Mallaguri area. Charu Mazumdar owned land there. I saw him distribute his land among the sharecroppers. I was a witness. Ladhi Majhi and Shakhi Majhi were the two sharecroppers. It was the time of the Tebhaga movement. The peasant worked tirelessly on the land, but would get nothing. This was unacceptable. The tebhaga had taken place in Jalpaiguri earlier, now it would also take place in Terai.” “Even though I was only a little girl, I used to go for every rally. It used to be great fun singing and dancing. Sometimes, the rally would be held from the morning till the evening. I learnt politics from these rallies."

=== Personal life ===
In the 1960s, Kesab Sarkar was known to frequently visit Shanti Munda's family home to pick up various fruits that they would grow in their garden. As a well known figure, the community gossiped about the relationship he had formed with Munda. Sarkar was 40 years old at the time while Munda was 15, and when Sarkar eventually asked for her hand in marriage, Munda's father disapproved. Regardless, Kanu Senyal planned the wedding which would take place in Dahru Rajgore's home in Choupukhuria. When talking about her father's reaction to the marriage, Munda recalled:

“Almost everyone came to the wedding, but there was no one from my house. My father Digan Munda, could never understand why Kesab Sarkar would want to marry a tribal girl. Further, he did not know how his own community would react to this marriage. He strongly believed that his daughter’s marriage to Kesab Sarkar would never be accepted by his tribe. At first, he was so angry at the news that he wanted to kill Keshab with an arrow. He wanted to move the court against him. My father loved me enormously. At times I feel my father died before his time worrying for me."

== Political career ==
Shanti Munda officially joined the Communist Party of India (Marxist) in 1965 after its split from the Communist Party of India in 1964 following fundamental ideological disagreements. During this time she was extremely active within the party, frequently holding and attending meetings and marches. She was known as an engaged leader who led a number of social efforts such as the digging and creation of wells for safe drinking water and raising of money to give to families who had no money to marry off their daughters. Munda was also known to be frequently moving back and forth between villages to settle various disputes and conflicts between the peasants and the land owners.

=== Naxalbari movement ===
The Naxalbari movement was a peasant revolt in 1967 in a small village in the Darjeeling district in West Bengal, Naxalbari. The movement was led by peasants living in Naxalbari who largely worked on tea plantation on large estates who had experienced oppression and exploitation at the hands of the landowners and moneylenders for centuries and attempted to reclaim the land they worked on.

==== Roots of the movement ====
There is a long history of armed peasant rebellions in India that dates back to the initial British conquest for Indian land. Indian political independence however, provided no real change for the oppressed class of peasants. The oppression of low income Indians with no real political assistance led to the development of a Communist Party of India.

The Communist Party of India (Marxist) developed their own program following their split from the Communist Party of India at the 7th Congress of the C.P.I (M) in Calcutta in 1964, detailing the specific strategies and goals of the party. The program characterized the Indian state as "the organ of the class rule of the bourgeoisic and landlord, led by the big bourgeoisie who are increasingly collaborating with foreign finance capital in pursuit of the capitalist path of development" Further, it pushed for "the replacement of the present bourgois-landlord state and government by a state of people's democracy and a government led by the working-class on the basis of a firm worker-peasant alliance." This program became the leading doctrine for the peasant rebellion.

In March 1967, Munda attended a large peasants conference was held in the Rambhola jote supported by the Siliguri sub-division of the C.P.I (M) leadership in the Darjeeling district. The leaders of the conference called for "the ending of monopoly ownership of land by the landlords, redistribution of land through peasants' committees and organization and arming of the peasants to destroy the resistance of landlords and rural reactionaries"

==== Naxalbari uprising ====
Following the conference, peasants and workers in the Naxalbari Village led by Charu Majumda, Kanu Sanyal, and Jangal Sathal initiated an armed struggle to redistribute land back to the landless. By May 1967, these peasants had established control in the Naxalbari, Kharidari and Phansidewa regions in the Darjeeling district. There were no major clashes between the police and the until 24 May when what Munda calls "the incident of Jhadu jote" took place. In certain areas the police had attempted to protect the landlords' interests and would enter the villages and interrogate the men living there. When describing the night of the 24th, Munda recalls:

"Perhaps the police had information that the leaders of the movement had assembled there. They mounted a raid on the village to arrest everyone in one fell swoop. When the villagers heard that the police were coming, they all grabbed whatever they could find, like and sharp or heavy household utensils and material that could be wielded as a weapon, their bows and arrows, and rushed to Jharu jote. It was like everyone from every home of the village and the surrounding ones had rushed in. Peasants, tea garden labour, their families, neighbors, everyone fathered in the field. Sonam Wangdi dies shot by an arrow”

Munda led this charge along with other notable leaders with her child on her back, just 15 days after giving birth. When asked about this day in a recent 2017 interview, Munda recalled:

"my youngest daughter was just 15 days old at that time. I tied her to my back and ran over to Jhoru jote. Women formed a circle and surrounded the police. Goodness! So many people! This otherwise green stretch of land was invisible under out feet. Everyone had come! Everyone! Men, women, the young, the elderly, even toddlers and infants, everyone! Like ants, a sea of humanity covered the whole field. Nothing could be seen beyond the dark heads that seemed to carpet the entire group. So many had gathered for this one cause and this one fight? Unbelievable! I hadn't seen anything like this before. I don't think even my forefathers had experienced anything like this. Khokan Majumda, Phani Master, and Lasa Kheroya were the leaders present on that day. There were a few other leaders too, but I cannot quite recall who they were."

Due to the fact that Munda had just given birth only 15 days prior, she became extremely ill in the following days. Although she was able to run to the Jhoru jote the previous day with the other women, she was unable to leave her home for days to follow. The day following the 24 May incident, police attempted to force their way into the surrounding villages. The female villages gathered around the police and their vehicles, many able to take guns away from the officers. An agreement was reached where if the women agreed to return the guns back to the officers, they promised to leave the area. The women complied, but after a short amount of time the police began shooting at unarmed women and children resulting in the death of 11 villagers.

== Post-Naxalabri movement ==
=== Backlash ===
After the 24 and 25 May incidents, major Naxalabri leader and husband of Shanti Munda, Kesab Sharkar was forced to go underground. He fled to Bihard and when he later returned to Dagapur where he was immediately arrested. Following this and the death of her close comrades, Munda and her young daughter went into hiding, finding shelter in Lataguri. Although she was in hiding, she was maintained her political work, frequently attending meetings at night. Although the movement received global recognition and support, the Communist Party of India (Marxist) did not approve of the actions of the Naxalabri's. They quickly discharged major members who had supported the uprising. This included leaders like Charu Majumdar, Souren Bose and Dilip Bagchi. But, these leaders did not abandon their political work. They went on to form their own branch of a Communist Party, The Communist Party of India (Marxist-Leninist).

After five years of hiding and secretive political work, Shanti Munda returned home.

"Five years I was away. I returned to the Mallaguri area 5 years later because my son had taken ill. I did not know where comrade Kesab Sarkar was. My house in Mallaguri had been illegally occupied by a person. I had 5 katha of cultivable land; that too was taken away because I did not have the adequate money to get it registered. I was completely destitute - homeless and landless. Adding to my isolation, my mother-in-law passed away. The death of my brother-in-law followed. I had no news of my husband. I felt very sad and alone..on seeing my abject condition the local CPI (M) and Congress people got together and offered me a job. I accepted it! I could barely make ends meet, but I still managed. Since I did not have any roof to live under, I used banana leaves, ute, and gunny sacks to weave a cover and make a fragile hut. That was all I could manage. Sometimes I thought, what did I do with my life? I was just 12-13 when I devoted myself to this cause..so many years. What do I have to show for it? It pains me. Yes, it saddens me. Yet, I never quit. I never let the Party. Not even now! I stand next to them, shoulder-to shoulder. I haven't stopped fights for the people I am with them. I am the party!"

== Recent years ==
On 23 March 2010, Shanti Munda experienced what she has deemed one of the largest tragedies of her eventful life, the suicide of her leader, Kanu Sanyal. In her own words she describes: “I pushed open the window and peeped in. Kanu dada is not there on his bed. Where is he? The rope line on which he used to hang his soiled shirt and dhoti is also missing. And then I saw dada hanging from the ceiling on the rope. I screamed.” Today, Munda lives with her daughter in law and grandchildren not very far from the site where the uprising took place many years ago. Munda is still an avid advocate for the same issues she fought for 50 years ago, but believes that same spirit has not been preserved in future generations, saying that "this generation doesn't care for [their] struggles...I have been bombarded with media interviews, but what the point of them. This generation will never understand Naxalbari. They are all fed dreams of capitalism" Specifically, Munda is referring to the effects of modernization, and modern day capitalism. "Today children are manual laborers in cities. Our son's work as a carpenter in Siliguri, they bring home some money on some days..on other days we go to sleep hungry. Another worry for Munda in the modern day is the excessive saffronisation of rural Bengal. "How can we buy into their false promises. They divide us in the religion. They are more concerned with protecting cattle than people. Why has the nation's discourse stooped to this level?" Despite all of this, Munda still has faith in the resurrection of the Naxalbari movement at the hands of the most recent generation of children. "My granddaughter is into athletics. She lost her father when she was very young but she never stopped dreaming. Every morning, she wakes up before the crack of dawn to train, then she cycles to her college in Siliguri, which is about 20 km away. I know a new Naxalbari will rise, and it will rise through the efforts of people like her."
