= Sushital Ray Chowdhury =

Indian politician (1917–1971)

Politburo Member of the CPIML
- In office 1969–1971

West Bengal State committee member of CPIM
- In office 1964–1967

Secretary of Hooghly District committee of CPI
- In office 1946–1964

Personal details
- Born: 1917
- Died: 1971 (aged 53–54); Hooghly, West Bengal, India
- Political party: Communist Party of India (Marxist-Leninist)
- Criminal charge: Criminal conspiracy
- Criminal penalty: Jailed

Sushital Ray Chowdhary (16 February 1917 – 13 March 1971) was an Indian Communist intellectual and founder member of Communist Party of India (Marxist-Leninist). He was the editor of the organs of the CPI, CPI(M) and CPI(ML). He eventually fell out with the mainstream Charu Majumdar group and died of a heart attack in March, 1971.

== Career ==
Sushital Ray Chowdhury graduated from the University of Calcutta and joined the Communist movement at an early age. Initially with Communist Party of India (CPI), he was elected secretary of the Hooghly district committee, and wrote extensively on issues such as the Tebhaga movement in party magazines Swadhinata, Sambad, etc. He entered the Calcutta District Committee after 1947, and also joined the editorial board of Swadhinata as a marxist intellectual (along with other radicals such as Saroj Dutta). However, Sushital was inclined to a more revolutionary brand of Marxism, and after the Communist Party split in 1964, he went with the Communist Party of India (Marxist).

At the time, CPI(M) adopted a radical stance, with erstwhile revolutionary leaders like Hare Krishna Konar "trumpeting revolutionary rhetoric, suggesting that militant confiscation of land was integral to the party's programme."

In the leadup to the 1967 Indian general election, CPI(M) decided to participate in parliamentary elections, much to the chagrin of radical idealists like Sushital. In 1965, he wrote a series of extreme-left articles in the magazine Chinta, challenging the party programme as "revisionist".

=== United Front government and Naxalbari ===
CPI(M) did unexpectedly well, and won 18.1% of the popular vote, though Congress remained the largest party with 127 (of 280) seats. In May 1967, The non-Congress parties linked up to form the United Front coalition, (CPI-M along with CPI and the breakaway Bangla Congress).

At this time, Charu Majumdar, who had been involved with the peasant tribals of North Bengal, brought out some cyclostyled pamphlets calling for armed revolution. A group of followers including Kanu Sanyal and Jangal Santhal lived and worked with the armed peasants, ousting landowners. Violence started with land grabbing in March but escalated with the murder of a policeman in May. However, with the deployment of state and central police, the movement was extinguished by July 1967.

== Expulsion from CPM ==
Sushital and other Calcutta based radicals supported the Naxalbari movement by forming Naxalbari Krishak Sangram Sahayak Samiti (NOKSS) in May 1967. Sushital served as secretary and former Indian National Army activist Pramod Ranjan Sengupta was the president of the organisation.

In September 1967, Sushital, along with Saroj Dutta and others from Kolkata, as well as Charu Majumdar, Kanu Sanyal etc. from Siliguri, were expelled from the CPI-M, which was embarrassed by their actions since it was a member in the ruling coalition, and no longer supported such radical steps.

On 12 November 1967, Sushital organized a two-day all India meeting of radical leftists at his house in Maniktala; Charu Majumdar flew down from Siliguri. Delegates included Satyanarayan Singh of Bihar, Appu of Tamil Nadu, and many others from Bengal. In May, 1968 the group adopted the name All India Coordination Committee of Communist Revolutionaries (AICCCR), with Sushital as its convenor. Sushital became the editor-in-chief of the mouthpieces of the group Deshabrati (Bengali), and Liberation (English).

=== Formation of CPI(ML) ===
In April 1969, AICCCR was reorganized into the Marxist-Leninist party, the CPI(Marxist -Leninist). The new anti-parliamentary party was announced to the world in May 1969 at a large meeting on the Maidan organized by Kanu Sanyal. Here there was a scuffle with CPI(M) cadres, a harbinger of much worse to come.

In a national CPI(ML) meeting in 1970, fissures started appearing between Charu and some others. By August 1970, Sushital was complaining that some pieces were appearing in the magazines without his knowledge, though he was editor-in-chief. He also suggested that the party should debate whether statues of personalities such as Rabindranath should be vandalised. However, Charu Majumdar did not agree, and after this Sushital was relieved of his editorial role, though he continued to be a politburo member, but was marginalized.

In November 1971, the dissident group Satyanarayan Singh and Shiv Kumar Mishra joined the dissidents. In November 1971, this dissident group formed a new Central Committee with Satyanarayan Singh as the General Secretary, and expelled Charu Majumdar.

== Death ==
Early in 1971, Sushital, who had become a forlorn figure, died of a heart attack during the period of underground. It was even rumoured that he may have been attacked by cadres close to the party.

== See also ==
- Jagdish Mahto
