= Vempatapu Satyanarayana =

Vempatapu Satyanarayana (Satyam) was a schoolteacher, member of several Indian Communist organizations, and a leader of the Srikakulam peasant uprising of 1967, along with Adibhatla Kailasam and Subbarao Panigrahi. They had started the "land to tiller" movement in Andhra Pradesh, which later spread to South Odisha.

Satyanarayana joined the Communist Party of India (Marxist-Leninist) (CPI(ML)) through the All India Coordination Committee of Communist Revolutionaries (AICCCR). He became a member of the Central Organizing Committee of the CPI(ML) in 1969. Later, he became a member of the new Central Committee that was elected in the first party congress with Charu Majumdar as its General Secretary. He was also the Secretary of the Srikakulam District Committee of the party. His small booklet on Srikakulam Peasant Armed Upsurge details the nature of Naxalbari uprising influence in the early phases of 1969 and 1970 in Andhra Pradesh.

== Death ==
It is a common belief among the Naxalite ranks, that he was killed together with Adibhatla Kailasam in a fake encounter in Srikakulam by the Andhra Pradesh police under the prior order of the state government around 10-11 July 1970.
