= Andhra Pradesh Committee of Communist Revolutionaries (Chandra Pulla Reddy) =

Andhra Pradesh Committee of Communist Revolutionaries was a communist group in Andhra Pradesh, India, led by Chandra Pulla Reddy. The group was formed through a split away from the original APCCR led by T. Nagi Reddy in 1971. In 1975 the organisation merged into the Communist Party of India (Marxist–Leninist) led by Satyanarayan Singh.
