= Muluk murder case =

1987 murder case in Birbhum, West Bengal, India

Muluk murder case refers to an incident where four CPI(ML) activists were hacked to death by CPI(M) activists in Muluk near Bolpur in Birbhum district in the Indian state of West Bengal, on 19 November 1987.

On the morning of that date a CPI(M) procession passing through the village had attacked the four Naxalite farm labourers who were in their fields. The mob beat them with sticks and hacked them to death. The dead were identified as Sheikh Jiauddin, Sheikh Mannan, Sudhir Ghosh and Nirmal Ghosh, supporters of the Kanu Sanyal faction of the CPI(ML).

The district judge of Birbhum, Dipak Saha Ray, awarded life terms to 46 CPI(M) cadres for their involvement in the Muluk murder case on 31 March 2009. The convicted CPI(M) cadres included Akhtar Sheikh, the then CPI(M} upapradhan of Muluk gram panchayat, Roushan Ali, the then CPI(M) panchayat samiti member, Mistri Murmu, the then CPI(M} gram panchayat member and Safiul Rahaman, the then CPI(M) branch committee secretary. Besides them, two primary school teachers, an employee of state electricity board and a NVF staff were also among those convicted. Of the 56 chargsheeted in the case, 10 had died. The convicts had been found guilty under Sections 302, 307 and 149 of Indian Penal Code (IPC). They were also to pay a fine of Rs 5,000 each.
