= Communist Party of India (Marxist–Leninist) Central Team =

- Founded: 1977
- Merged into: Communist Party Reorganization Centre of India (Marxist–Leninist), 1994
- Ideology: Communism; Marxism–Leninism; Anti-revisionism
- Political position: Far-left

Communist Party of India (Marxist–Leninist) Central Team was formed in 1977 when activists from Punjab, Maharashtra and West Bengal of Communist Party of India (Marxist–Leninist) (CPI(ML)) of Satyanaryan Singh revolted against the party leadership. CPI(ML) Central Team reaffirmed the legacy of Charu Majumdar.

The principal strength of the party was in Punjab. In Punjab the new party started publishing Surkh Rekha. The party built up the Punjab Kisan Union, and led struggles particularly in the Jalandhar and Ludhiana districts.

During the Khalistani days, the Punjab unit developed cooperation with one splinter group of the Unity Centre of Communist Revolutionaries of India (Marxist–Leninist) (UCCRI(ML)) within the Front against Repression and Communalism. This experience attracted the group to a mass line. In 1994 the Punjab branch of CPI(ML) Central Team unified with Centre of Communist Revolutionaries of India, Communist Unity Centre of India and Marxist–Leninist Organising Centre to form the Communist Party Reorganization Centre of India (Marxist–Leninist). Surkh Rekha became the publication of CPRCI(ML).

The Maharashtra and West Bengal branches maintained themselves as CPI(ML) Central Team. Ahead of the 1999 Lok Sabha elections CPI(ML) Central Team signed a boycott call together with CPI(ML) People's War and the Revolutionary Communist Centre of India (Maoist).

== See also ==
- List of anti-revisionist groups
- List of Naxalite and Maoist groups in India
