= Subbarao Panigrahi =

Telugu poet and politician

Subbarao Panigrahi (1933 ― 23 December 1969) was a Telugu revolutionary poet and leader of Srikakulam peasant uprising.

== Career ==
Panigrahi was born in 1933 in a poor Odia Brahmin family at Sompeta of Srikakulam district in Andhra Pradesh. Initially, he worked as a priest in a local temple. Panigrahi wrote a number of songs, poems and dramas like Kalachakra, Vimukti, Kumkumrekha, Rikshawalla and Mrigajaal. He participated in Naxalbari uprising and joined the Communist Party of India (Marxist-Leninist). In 1969, Subbarao served the secretary of the Sompeta area committee of the party and also took charges to mobilised the people of Uddan and Paralakhemundi area. He organised the peasant movement in Srikakulam and Northern Andhra with two prominent Naxal leaders Vempatapu Satyanarayana and Adibhatla Kailasam. Panigrahi played a vital role in cultural wing of the party to form People's war in rural Andhra Pradesh. On 23 December 1969, he was killed in a police encounter near Andhra-Odisha border.

== Popular culture ==
It is reported that Telugu action drama film Acharya is set on the uprising led by Panigrahi.
