= Dilip Bagchi =

Indian Bengali politician

- Born: Tantihand village, Pabna District
- Died: Krishnagar
- Occupations: Teacher, Mass Singer
- Known for: Political activism

Dilip Bagchi (1935 — 11 January 2007) was a Bengali mass singer, educationist and political activist. He was an active member of Indian People's Theatre Association of West Bengal.

== Early life ==
Bagchi was born in Tantihand village, Pabna District in Bangladesh. His family was attached with political and revolutionary activities in British India. His father, Durgadas Bagchi, was a member of the Jugantar group and elder brother took part in the Royal Indian Navy mutiny in 1946. After the partition, he came to Bankura and got admission in the Howrah Zilla School with his batch mate, veteran actor Soumitra Chatterjee. Bagchi regularly performed in school drama with Chatterjee, as a stage singer.

== Cultural movement ==
He was initially dismissed from the school for having connection with the banned Communist party but latter joined in Narasinha Dutt College, Howrah. Since college life he became an active member of Indian People's Theatre Association (IPTA), Howrah District and latter joined in student and cultural wings of the Communist Party of India. Due to the political and cultural works he did not completed the graduation and again admitted into Krishnagar Government College. In the time of 1956 flood of West Bengal he took part in rescue team and collected fund roaming with the villages. That point of time Bagchi composed several mass, folk songs. His family was dead against those activities and sent him to Mumbai but Bagchi kept contact with Salil Chowdhury, Ruma Guha Thakurta, Basu Bhattacharya and others Bengali cultural political personalities there. It helped him to represent the Bengal in National conference of IPTA in Delhi. As per direction of Party congress of the communist party 1957 he went to the villagers again and worked with labours and farmers. Due to his singing ability he organised peasant association in Nadia and Murshidabad district successfully.

== Politics ==
In 1951, Bagchi got the membership of the communist party. In 1962, at the time of Sino-Indian War, he was arrested under the Defence of India Act and sent to Baharampur Jail. He wrote a number of songs while in jail. Before the 1964 Party Congress of the Communist Party, he created a secrete Bolshevik Core with other comrades to fight against revisionism. His team was known as Surya Sen group. While studying M.A in North Bengal University, he worked for the Left Front, became General Secretary of the students union and latter met with Charu Majumdar in Siliguri. But Majumdar negated his line of action. Bagchi wrote the first song on Naxalbari uprising in Kamtapuri dialect of the Rajbanshis 'O Naxal Naxal Naxalbarir Maa' which was popular to the Naxalites members. On 22 August 1967 he organised a public meeting in the presence of Utpal Dutt in Siliguri in support of Naxal movement. Immediately after the meeting Bagchi along with Charu Majumdar, Souren Bose and Mahadev Mukherjee were ousted from Communist Party of India (Marxist) but he did not join in the newly formed Communist Party of India (Marxist-Leninist). Police arrested him 28 September 1967 from Murshidabad and sent him Siliguri Special Jail with Jangal Santhal and Pabitrapani Saha. While in Darjeeling Jail he took part in a hunger strike for the declaration of status of political prisoner. Police tortured him a lot and again sent him to Dum Dum Central Jail in Kolkata. He was released finally in 1969 and struggled to reinstate the service. After the retirement Bagchi was involved with Cultural and Democratic movement, Human Rights Association. He died in 2007 at Krishnagar.
