= Saroj Dutta =

Indian intellectual and Poet (1914–1971)

- সরোজ দত্ত
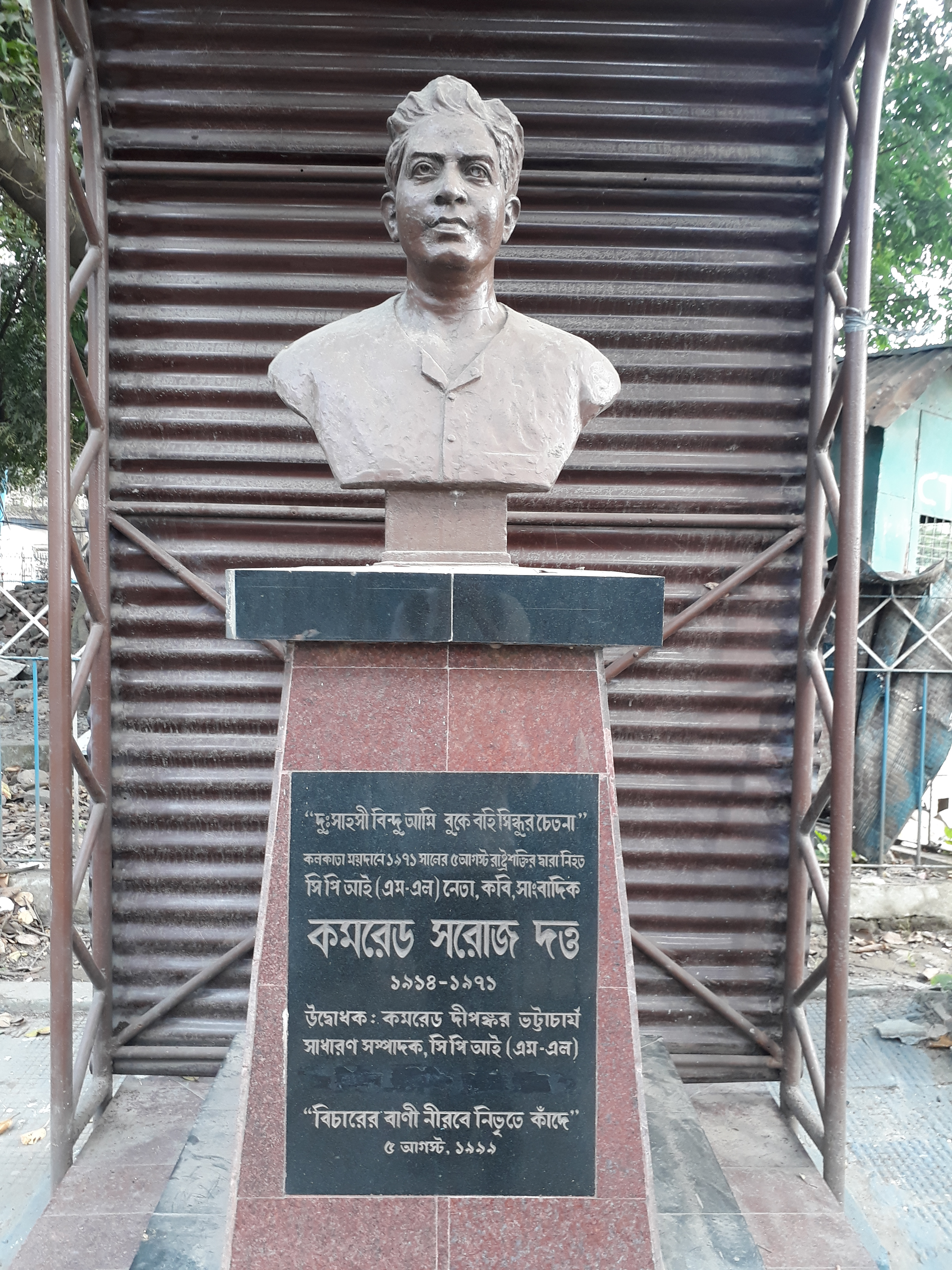
- 2nd West Bengal State Secretary of CPI(ML)

West Bengal State Secretary of the CPI(ML)
- In office 1969–1971
- Preceded by: Sushital Ray Chowdhury

Personal details
- Born: 13 March 1914 Jessore, East Bengal, British Raj
- Died: 5 August 1971 (aged 57) Kolkata, West Bengal, India
- Party: Communist Party of India (Marxist-Leninist)
- Other political affiliations: Communist Party of India (1949–1964); Communist Party of India (Marxist) (1964–1967)
- Spouse: Bela Dutta
- Children: Siraj Dutta; Kunal Dutta
- Education: University of Calcutta Scottish Church College
- Profession: Politician, poet, journalist, Social Worker

Saroj Dutta (March 13, 1914 – August 5, 1971) popularly known comrade SD, was an Indian communist intellectual and poet, active in the Naxalite movement in West Bengal in the 1960s. He was the first West Bengal state secretary of Communist Party of India (Marxist-Leninist) (CPI(ML)). He also remained editor-in-chief of the Amrita Bazar Patrika during the 1940s.

It is commonly thought that he was killed in a police encounter on August 5, 1971, but till now he was missing in police and state records.

== Early life and education ==
He was born in a land-owning family in Jessore District in East Bengal, (now in Narail District, Bangladesh) on 13 March 1914. He studied at the Victoria Collegiate School in Narail, and later graduated from the Scottish Church College in Calcutta in 1936. He subsequently earned his M.A. in English Literature 1938 from the University of Calcutta.

== Career ==
Dutta joined the Amrit Bazar Patrika in early 1940s, after completing his studies, however he was fired in 1949 for joining violent activities as a member of the Communist Party of India. In 1962, after the Sino-Indian War he was briefly arrested for having pro-China (Maoist) sympathies. In 1964 he joined the Communist Party of India (Marxist), CPI(M), and was an editor of their paper, Swadhinata, along with Sushital Ray Chowdhary. He was among the many radicals who were disillusioned when the CPI(M) decided to join electoral politics in the run-up to the 1967 elections.

Attracted to a more radical form of revolutionary Marxism, he along with Sushital Ray Chowdhury and some other Calcutta intellectuals, supported the Charu Majumdar-led Naxalbari uprising in May 1967. In April 1969, he was also one of the founder members of Communist Party of India (Marxist–Leninist), CPI (ML), an organisation which was outlawed a year later for conducting armed guerrilla warfare targeted at the landlords and the police.

== Death ==
Police Arrested Dutta from his friend Debiprasad Chattapadhyaya's home on the night of August 4–5, 1971. It is stated that he was killed by the Kolkata Police on the Aryan Club ground in the Kolkata Maidan that very morning. It is also said that the movie star Uttam Kumar witnessed the shooting while on a morning walk, but talked about it much later when drunk; this is the storyline of the 1994 Bengali-language movie Sopan. Bengali writer Dibyendu Palit also portrayed the incident in his novel Sahajoddha.

In 1977, after the CPI(M) returned to power with a Left-front majority, many Naxalite sympathisers signed on a petition seeking an investigation of Saroj Dutta's death. The petition was given to the chief minister Jyoti Basu. However, no investigation has ever been held.

His comrade, Charu Majumdar died in police custody a year later.

== Film ==
A feature-length documentary film, S.D. :Saroj Dutta and His Times, directed by Kasturi Basu and Mitali Biswas in 2018, featured Dutta's journey as a poet, journalist, translator, ideologue and revolutionary. The film contains the only on-camera interviews of two eyewitnesses - Debiprasad Chattopadhyay and Manjusha Chattopadhyay - of Saroj Dutta's abduction and disappearance by the Kolkata Police.
