= G. Raghava Reddy =

Indian farmer and police officer (1928–2022)

Chief of Corps of Detectives

Personal details
- Born: 1928
- Died: 4 April 2022 (aged 93–94)
- Occupation: Indian Police Service officer, farmer
- Known for: Innovative farming, main investigator on the case against T. Nagi Reddy
- Awards: President Police Medal for Distinguished Service (1982); Indian Police Medal for Meritorious Service (1972)

G. Raghava Reddy (1928 – 4 April 2022) was an Indian Police Service officer, who was also known for his innovative farming. He was the main investigator on the famous case against communist leader T. Nagi Reddy.

In his long career as a police official, he served in many departments such as chief of corps of detectives.

== T. Nagi Reddy Case ==
T. Nagi Reddy was a popular communist leader, who was convicted of waging war against state. He was caught, along with his twenty-two colleagues, before he could act. Raghava was the main investigator on this case, which involved more than 325 witnesses. Nagi Reddy and other accused were convicted. Nagi Reddy jumped bail and later died a natural death, whereas the twenty-two other men convicted served their jail term.

== Retirement ==
Reddy continued to guide a number of police academies across nation. His memoirs, As I look back have been used by police research bodies.

G. Raghava Reddy was also known as a successful farmer. He has deep interests in various agricultural practices, such as turning barren land into a lush farm. This farm has been cited in many news papers.

Reddy died on 4 April 2022, at the age of 94.

== Awards ==
For his meritorious service, he was awarded the President Police medal for distinguished service in 1982 and the Indian police medal for meritorious service in 1972. After thirty years of service, he retired in 1986 as Deputy Inspector General of Police.
