= Unity Centre of Communist Revolutionaries of India (Marxist–Leninist) =

- Abbreviation: UCCRI(ML)
- Founder: T. Nagi Reddy; Moni Guha; Shamsher Singh Sheri
- Preceded by: APCCCR; RCUC(ML); PCRC
- Succeeded by: Sohi faction Ajmer faction DV faction CCRI; CPI(ML) Janashakti
- Peasant's wing: Wahikar Union
- Ideology: Communism; MLMTT

Unity Centre of Communist Revolutionaries of India (Marxist–Leninist) was created through the merger of Andhra Pradesh Coordination Committee of Communist Revolutionaries, Northern Zone Committee RCUC(M-L), West Bengal Communist Unity Centre and West Bengal Co-ordination Committee of Revolutionaries (WBCCR). The formation took place at a unity conference in April 1975. The unity conference adopted a resolution on martyrs, programme, path, method of work, constitution and a statement on unification. The unity conference elected a Central Committee with Devulapalli Venkateswara Rao as its secretary. UCCRI(ML) had as its ambition to unite all communist revolutionary forces, including people within the Communist Party of India (Marxist-Leninist) (CPI(ML)) fold. UCCRI(ML) started publishing the SPARK as its central organ.

== Overview ==
Shortly after the formation of UCCRI(ML), the State of Emergency was proclaimed by the Indira Gandhi regime. UCCRI(ML) was proscribed and forced underground.

There was a decision on behalf of the Kerala Communist Unity Centre to merge with UCCRI(ML) in June 1975, but that organization suffered internal splits and the merged was cancelled.

In July 1976 T. Nagi Reddy, who had been the most important leader of the party, died. His death became a severe set-back for UCCRI(ML). In August the same year the organization suffered a split. A conflict had emerged in the CC, and D. V. Rao had been removed from the post of secretary. D. V. Rao accused three other CC members (led by a CC member from the NZC) of having formed a "rival centre", and suspended them unilaterally. In the split the Northern Zone Committee (i.e., Rajasthan) and Bengal Committee had broken away, along with the "rival centre". The break-away group later developed a pro-Albanian line.

D. V. Rao returned to Andhra Pradesh and rallied the Andhra organization around him. D. V. Rao pushed through a merger of the Punjab Communist Revolutionary Committee with the UCCRI(ML) in June 1976. He resurrected a Central Committee including himself, the PCRC secretary Harbhajan Sohi and two leaders from Andhra (Madhu and Anand), which was to function until a regular conference would be held.

UCCRI(ML) of D. V. Rao later evaluated the split in the following way:

From whatever the discussion that had taken place, we can draw some conclusions.

1. Excepting on two issues, there reflected no divergencies in the CC on political positions adopted by Com. D. V. Rao in the course of whole development.

2. Com. D. V. Rao viewed the whole course of development like this: The NZC and its allies did not accept the line with convictions and genuinity. This was the basic cause for the split. They were manipulators, careerists and doubtful elements. They were incorrigible. Hence the split was unavoidable sooner or later.

Branches were started in Orissa and Kerala. In 1978 a group from the Debra area of Midnapore, West Bengal joined UCCRI(ML) after some rounds of discussions with the CC. The convenor of the erstwhile Maharashtra State Committee of Communist Revolutionaries (which had left All India Coordination Committee of Communist Revolutionaries after the expulsion of Andhra Pradesh Coordination Committee of Communist Revolutionaries) joined UCCRI(ML), leading to the formation of a unit in Maharashtra.

UCCRI(ML) split for the second time in September 1979 when the Punjab committee, under the leadership of Harbhajan Sohi, broke away. HBS had developed a criticism of Mao Zedong's Three Worlds Theory. D. V. Rao, on the other hand, defended the Three Worlds Theory and the new leadership of the Chinese Communist Party. The Punjab committee came to establish a parallel UCCRI(ML).

Ahead of the 1980 elections, UCCRI(ML) reviewed their stand towards participation. UCCRI(ML) always saw the issue of elections as a tactical issue. Initially the party had taken the policy of non-participation. But in 1980 UCCRI(ML) came out with an appeal to "defeat pro-super power reactionary forces in elections". An article written by D. V. Rao in the January 1980 issue of Proletarian Line (the central organ of UCCRI(ML) at the time) proposed the following:

We have been treating and are treating the participation or boycott... as a form of struggle and our practice is the same. We do not think that "boycott" can be the slogan of present day.... In the same way it is too premature to think of candidates in the prevailing situation in which the defective nature of electoral system is one. In these conditions our participation will be one of taking measures to advance the revolutionary movement by utilizing this opportunity. The people are being mobilised to see the real face of contesting parties who have not been serving them in any way what so ever.
Keeping all the points in view, we appeal to the people to defeat the game of the two super powers in general and Soviet Union in particular. We appeal to people to defeat the game of landlords who are trying to survive by diverting the agrarian revolutionary movement. Almost all the election parties are connected with these forces in one way or the other.

The article continues; "Since pro-super power and reactionary forces in general and pro-Soviet forces in particular pose the main danger to our country we will mobilse all those forces who are opposed to them and see that they are strengthened so that they are able to defeat them as far as possible. In this connection, we ask the people to differentiate between genuine and fake anti-Soviet, democratic forces."

In the actual electoral campaign, however, the new policy was not consistent. In Andhra Pradesh the party promoted non-participation, in reality a boycott, whereas the party supported certain candidates in West Bengal and Orissa. In the aftermath of the elections, a split surged with D. V. Rao leaving the party with a group of followers in Andhra. D. V. Rao set up his own UCCRI(ML). After D. V. Rao's departure, Anand became the new CC Secretary of the remaining UCCRI(ML).

In 1988 Anand broke away from UCCRI(ML) after a long period of dissent in the organization. The rift between Anand and other surged in the preparations to hold a party conference. Anand was able to win over the Maharashtra unit. Anand also reopened relations with Sohi's UCCRI(ML). After the split, the faction of Anand together with Sohis faction created the Centre of Communist Revolutionaries of India together with three other groups the same year.

The remaining UCCRI(ML) faction, led by Viswam and Madhu, merged into the Communist Party of India (Marxist-Leninist) Janashakti in 1992. Madhu signed the merger agreement on behalf of UCCRI(ML).
