= Maharashtra Communist Party =

Maharashtra Communist Party was a splinter faction of Central Reorganisation Committee, Communist Party of India (Marxist–Leninist) in Maharashtra when its leader K. Venu decided to denounce of the Naxalism and disband the party in 1991.

MCP merged with Kerala-based Kerala Communist Party to form Communist Party of India (Marxist-Leninist) MUC.
