= Communist Party of India (Marxist–Leninist) Maoist Unity Centre =

Communist Party of India (Marxist–Leninist) Maoist Unity Centre (MUC) was formed in 1997 as the merged entity of two naxal-factions - Maharashtra Communist Party and Kerala Communist Party, which in turn is the splinter factions of Central Reorganisation Committee, Communist Party of India (Marxist–Leninist).

== History ==
In 1991, Central Reorganisation Committee, Communist Party of India (Marxist–Leninist) leader K. Venu decided to denounce of the Naxalism and disband the party. He renounced Maoism and declared an All India communist party as an impossibility. Groups dissatisfied with the dissolution formed the Maharashtra Communist Party and Kerala Communist Party.

== Merger with Communist Party of India (Marxist–Leninist) Naxalbari ==
In April 1999, the party dissolved and incorporated into the Communist Party of India (Marxist-Leninist) (Naxalbari).
