= Srikakulam peasant uprising =

Peasant uprising in Andhra Pradesh, India

- Part of the origins of Naxalite–Maoist insurgency
Date	1967–1970
Location	Srikakulam
Result	Uprising suppressed

Belligerents
India	CPI (ML)

Commanders and leaders
	Vempatapu Satyanarayana †; Adibhatla Kailasam †

Units involved
CRPF	Local peasantry

Casualties and losses
120 CRPF killed	Unknown

The Srikakulam peasant uprising occurred from 1967 to 1970, in Srikakulam district, Andhra Pradesh, India. The Naxalbari uprising at the beginning of the Naxalite movement during the 1960s inspired the upsurge.

== Origin ==
The Telangana Rebellion that occurred between 1946 and 1947 left a deep impression on the communist movement going on in India. This ensued an internal debate and formulation of the "Andhra Thesis" where the communists from Andhra Pradesh urged that for the sake of Indian Revolution the communist movement must follow the style of communist movement in China. In June 1948, the "Andra Letter" was articulated that emphasised on the strategy of protracted people's war and new democracy based on Maoism.

The communists had gained a prominent mass base in the tribal regions of Srikakulam since the early 1950s under leadership of two school teachers: Vempatapu Satyanarayana and Adibhatla Kailasam. The songs and verses of poet Subbarao Panigrahi also had a great involvement. With the deepening debate and crisis within the major communist parties and subsequent upheaval of naxalbari the leadership aligned themselves with the newly formed All India Coordination Committee of Communist Revolutionaries which later transformed into Communist Party of India (Marxist–Leninist).

== Uprising ==
On 31 October 1967, two persons associated with the communists, Koranna and Manganna were killed by landlords at Levidi village while the two were going to attend Girijan Samagam Conference. In retaliation the Girijans started retaliating by land, property and food grain seizure from the landlords. This activities spread in different villages paralyzing the local police for six months until additional police forces were sent by the government. The tribals started facing severe offensive. The leadership started organizing the mass upheaval into an organized movement by forming peasant guerrilla squads and a more systemic resistance.

=== Incidents ===
On 25 November 1968, 250 tribal peasants raided a land lords house snatching hoards of food grains, taking possession of belongings worth Rs.20,000 and burnt many documents.

On 20 December 1968, at Belereguda village guerrilla squads composed of 500 tribal peasants launched a surprise attack on 500 police officers, inflicting severe damage.

== Decline ==
By 1969 activities of the peasant squads increased along with there increasing actions. The government sent 12,000 CRF to tackle the uprising. Serious warfare continued from 6 months. The major conflict zone was spread throughout the regions of upper Aviri area, Bothili hills, Sanjuvai, Vegulavada, Ithamanugadda in Srikakulam. By January 1970, 120 CRPF were killed. But the uprising soon met a rapid decline. Their uprising faced with serious losses due to the casualties inflicted on the leadership. Youth leader Tamada Ganapathy, Panchadi Krishnamurthy from Boddapadu, Dr. Chaganti Bhaskar Rao from Parchoor, Prakasam district, Subbarao Panigrahi and six others killed by Andhra police between May 10 - Nov 3 1969. By 1970, 10 July, Vempatapu Satyanaraya, Adibhatla Kailasam and others like Panchadi Nirmala were also killed and the uprising soon disseminated.

The reminiscences of the uprising still have some influence on the Naxalite–Maoist insurgency and the splintered Communist Party of India (Marxist–Leninist) (CPI(ML)) factions that exist today.

== In popular culture ==
- Formation of VIRASAM (Viplava Rachayithala Sangam) or Revolutionary Writer's Association.
- Formation of Jana Natya Mandali (JNM) group by artists comprising popular film producer like Narasinga Rao.
- Formation of Progressive Democratic Students Union in Hyderabad, Osmania University remembering George Reddy.
