= Adibhatla =

Adibhatla is an Indian surname. Notable people with the surname include:

- Adibhatla Kailasam, Indian communist leader
- Adibhatla Narayana Dasu, Indian poet and musician
