= Organising Committee, Communist Party of India (Marxist–Leninist) =

The Organizing Committee, Communist Party of India (Marxist–Leninist) (OCCPI(ML)), also known as the Bihar-Bengal Committee (CPI(ML)), was a communist organization in India led by B.N. Sharma.

OCCPI(ML) was in a close cooperation with the Unity Centre of Communist Revolutionaries of India (Marxist–Leninist) (UCCRI(ML)). There was a period of cooperation between the two organizations on trade union solidarity. Discussions took place on forming joint students fronts, for example. However, the process was interrupted when the Bengal committee of UCCRI(ML) got entangled in a fractional conflict. In 1988, OCCPI(ML) merged with four other groups to form the Centre of Communist Revolutionaries of India.

== See also ==
- List of Naxalite and Maoist groups in India
