= Sumani Jhodia =

Indian tribal activist from Odisha

- Born: Rayagada, Odisha, India
- Known for: Tribal rights activism

Sumani Jhodia is an Indian tribal activist hailing from Rayagada district of Odisha best known for campaigning against the sale of liquor in tribal areas, advocating for tribal rights over minor forest produce, and opposing government policies that lease tribal land to private companies for industrial projects. In 1995, Biju Patnaik, then Chief Minister of Odisha, appointed her as one of the unofficial advisors on sustainable development, literacy, and the poverty-alleviation programmes. Sumani was honoured with 2003 Rani Gaidinliu Zeiliang Stree Shakti Award (predecessor of the Nari Shakti Puraskar) by the Government of India.

== Early life and education ==
Sumani Jhodia was born in the Siriguda village in Rayagada, Odisha. Her family is part of Jhodia Paroja, a tribal community with a population of 50,000 living across 85 Indian villages, particularly in the Kashipur block of the Rayagada district. Primarily a forest-dwelling community, Jhodias make a living by collecting forest produce, practicing podu chasa (or shifting cultivation), and engaging in various forms of daily-wage labour.

Sumani's father, Ravi Jhodia, encouraged her to attend school, but she dropped out after six months due to the nearest school being three kilometres away. By 17, she was married and had her first child. At the time, Ramdhar Jhodia was considered to be the most literate man in her village, having studied till Class 9 (or middle school). He worked as a night schoolteacher with Agragamee, a local non-governmental organization. The village elders persuaded Sumani to enroll at Agragamee, where she learned to read and write. She also attended Agragamee's leadership development programme that made her aware of the exploitation her tribal community was being subjected to.

== Activism ==
Sumani and her team of advisors faced opposition from local liquor barons, and local goons for their efforts. Aundhari Majhi, one of the women with special policing powers, filed a police complaint against Rati Majhi, the owner of one of the local breweries, for threatening her. Sumani mobilised 5000 women from the Kashipur block to surround the police station until Majhi was rounded up. As many as eight criminal cases were filed against Sumani during this time. She, alongside a group of tribal women, was attacked by an axe-wielding man on her way back from Mandibisi. He was kept in policy custody for four days after the woman filed a formal complaint against him.
