= D. V. Rao =

Indian politician (1917–1984)

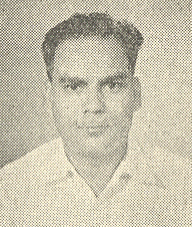
D.V. Rao in 1957

Devulapalli Venkateswara Rao (1 June 1917 – 12 July 1984) was an Indian politician. He was a member of the 2nd Lok Sabha of India. He represented the Nalgonda constituency of Telangana.

D.V. Rao was born in Ingurthi village, Warangal District on 1 June 1917, son of Devulapalli Varada Rao. His family hailed from Bandameedi Chandupatla village, Suryapet taluk, Nalgonda District.

Whilst a high school student in Khammam he took part in the 3rd conference of the Andhra Mahasabha. D.V. Rao was active in the students movement, organizing protests against the Nizam of Hyderabad government. Whilst a B.A. student at Osmania University, he was an organiser of the 'Vande Mataram' students movement in Hyderabad State. He was expelled from university for his role in the protests, but was able to complete his graduation at Jabalpur Arts College in 1938. He came into contact with Marxist literature during this period. After having returned to his village, he married Ranganayakamma in May 1939.

D.V. Rao was recruited by the Communist Party of India in 1939. D.V. Rao would serve as President of the Nalgonda District Committee of the Andhra Mahasabha, and would go on to serve as secretary of the organization. He was a key organiser of the Telangana armed struggle and spent eight years in the underground (until 1953). He played an active part in the drafting of the 1948 Andhra Thesis of the Provincial Secretariat of CPI, which for the first time in India outlined a revolutionary line inspired by the experiences of the Chinese Communist Party under Mao Zedong. In the late 1960s Rao argued that the surrender of arms of the Telangana struggle had been a great betrayal.

He was the secretary of the Nalgonda District Committee of the CPI, and secretariat member of the CPI Telangana Committee (formed in February 1952) and a member of the CPI Central Committee. D.V. Rao was the youngest member of the CPI before the 1964 split. He served as Vice President of the Telangana Kisan Sabha. D.V. Rao was elected to the Lok Sabha from the Nalgonda constituency in the 1957 Indian general election.

In June 1968 Rao founded the Andhra Pradesh Coordination Committee of Communist Revolutionaries (APCCCR) along with T. Nagi Reddy, Chandra Pulla Reddy and Kolla Venkaiah. In April 1975 D.V. Rao and T. Nagi Reddy founded the Unity Centre of Communist Revolutionaries of India (Marxist–Leninist) (UCCRI(ML)). In 1974 D.V. Rao's Telangana Armed Struggle and the Path of Indian Revolution was published in English and Telugu. The pamphlet was a review of P. Sundarayya's work Telangana People’s Struggle and its Lessons. In the late 1970s, he became the founding editor of The Proletarian Line.

D.V. Rao died on 12 July 1984. His work The History of the People’s Armed Struggle of Telangana (1946-51) Volume-I was published in Telugu posthumously in 1988, the book covers the history of the Telangana struggle up to the 1948 Police Action.
