= Revolutionary Communist Party (India) =

The Revolutionary Communist Party was a minor naxalite faction that merged with Centre of Communist Revolutionaries of India in 1988. It was based in Punjab. RCP was led by Takra. There was another organization with the same name founded in 1934 by Saumyendranath Tagore, which is different from RCP (India).

On 30 July 1992, CCRI merged with six other groups and formed the Communist Party of India (Marxist Leninist) Janashakti or CPI (ML). the other groups are one faction of the Unity Centre of Communist Revolutionaries of India (Marxist–Leninist), CPI (ML) Agami Yug, Paila Vasudev Rao's CPI (ML), CPI (ML) [Khokan Majumdar Faction], Coordination Committee of Communist Revolutionaries (CCCR) and Communist Revolutionary Group for Unity (CRGU).
