= Pramod Ranjan Sengupta =

Bengali revolutionary, Marxist (1907–1974)

Pramod Ranjan Sengupta (1907–1974) was a Bengali Marxist intellectual and revolutionary, attached with of Indian National Army led by Netaji Subhas Chandra Bose.

== Early life ==
Sengupta was born in British India at Dumka, presently in the state of Jharkhand. His father Harshanath Sengupta was a reputed doctor of Dumka. In 1925 while studying in Krishnagar Government College, at Krishnanagar, Nadia he came in contact with Hemanta Kumar Sarkar, Anantahari Mitra, Mahadev Sarkar and gravitated towards revolutionary politics.

== Revolutionary activities ==
Sengupta was arrested for his connection with Dakshineswar Bomb Case and was interned in Shibchar village of Faridpur District, presently in Bangladesh. During this period he completed graduation. After his release in 1927, he went to England for higher studies. While studying in London School of Economics, he joined India League and the London Dock workers' trade union. Sengupta went to Germany in 1928 at the invitation of Saumyendranath Tagore who introduced him to the members of the Berlin Committee. While returning to England, French police arrested him with a revolver. After release, he met international communist Leaders like Rajani Palme Dutt, Shapurji Saklatvala and Harry Pollitt. In 1934-35 he participated in the communist group of studies along with other Indian students in London which latter formed the antiimperialist Progressive Writers Association. Sengupta also worked as a reporter for Hindustan Standard in London. In 1938 he submitted the thesis paper regarding the 'Agro related development in India' and got the Ph.D degree. He went to Spain to join the International Brigades against the Nationalist forces. During World War II Sengupta joined in Indian National Army formed by Subhas chandra Bose in Berlin and he became its Program Director. He also edited the Ajad hind magazine for a short while. After the war he was arrested in 1945 by the British military Mission and was imprisoned for 10 months. In 1946, Sengupta returned to India, joined Left-wing politics and was again imprisoned in 1950 in the Presidency jail in Kolkata. After release, he joined in Communist Party of India.

== Other movements ==
Sengupta was active in International Peace Movement, Progressive Writers' Movement, Bharatiya Gananatya Sangha, Democratic Rights and Civil Society Movement after the commencement of The Emergency (India). He was the President of All India Coordination Committee of Communist Revolutionaries (AICCCR) at the time of Naxalbari uprising. Pramod Ranjan Sengupta, popularly known as Pramod Sengupta, was a founder member of Bengal's civil liberty organization Association for Protection of Democratic Rights (APDR), and elected as its first general secretary in 1972.

== Literary works ==
Sengupta was a Marxist intellectual and socio political essayist and. A number of his articles were published in various magazines. He wrote the following books:

- Bhartiya Mahabidroha
- Nilbidroho o Tatkalin Bangali Samaj
- Kalantarer Pathik Romain Rolland
- Naxalbari and Indian Revolution
