= Jangal Santhal =

Indian politician (1925–1988)

Politburo Member of CPI(ML)
- In office 1969–1971

Personal details
- Born: 1925 Hatighisa, Darjeeling district, Bengal Presidency, British India
- Died: 4 December 1988 (aged 62–63) Darjeeling district, West Bengal, India
- Party: Communist Party of India (Marxist-Leninist) (1969–1977)
- Spouse: Gangu Hansda (first wife)
- Known for: Naxalbari uprising Communist Leader
- Nickname: Jangal Santal
- Criminal information
- Criminal charge: Criminal conspiracy
- Penalty: Jailed (1967–1969, 1970–1977)

Jangal Santhal, also known as Jangal Santal (1925 – 4 December 1988) was an Indian political activist.

He was from Hatighisa village, Darjeeling district in north West Bengal, was one of the founders of the Naxalite movement (along with Charu Majumdar and Kanu Sanyal).

Santhal started his political life in 1949 in Nepal. Santhal was a well-known figure among the Adivasi sharecroppers, peasants and tea labourers of the hill and tarai areas of Darjeeling district. He stood unsuccessfully for elections in February 1957 and 1962 as a Communist Party of India candidate and also in 1967 on the Communist Party of India (Marxist) ticket. He was one of the primary mobilizers and organizers of the uprising in Naxalbari and subsequent Naxalite movement that spread throughout India. After his release from prison a second time in 1977, he tried to reignite his vision for the Naxalite movement and India's communist parties, but soon became disillusioned at what they had become, sinking into a depression and turning towards alcoholism. He disappeared from public life at the same time. His legacy and reputation is very divisive, controversial and contentious, as differing factions within the Naxalite movement and Communist groups within India in general seek to propagate their own ideologies and visions.

== Early life (1925–1949) ==
Jangal Santhal's father name was Kanna Kisku. He was a worker in the Kamalpur Tea Estate, Bagdogra, in the district of Darjeeling. Santal tribes were migrated to Dooars during British Period for working in Tea gardens. Jangal Santhal moved to Naxalbari in West Bengal, India with his mother, two brothers, and sister after his father's death. In Naxalbari Santhal worked as a share-cropper under a jotedar named Durlabh Mohammad. A few years later he went back to Nepal and started a family with his first wife Gangu Hansda. He also had a second wife and children with her. After naxalbari uprisings, Santhal's whole family including his wives and children were victims of their far left political activities. During the Naxalite movement, the police warned landowners not to offer any job to his wives in any tea garden so that they as well as their children would starve and die in the long run.

== Kisan Sabha ==
Kisan Sabha was a peasants front of the Communist Party of India which Santhal was a member of in 1952 and where he gained basic knowledge of politics. In the conference of the Kisan Sabha held in 1959, Santhal protested against the principles and decisions of distribution of the illegal landed property which was created by the Kisan Sabha. Even though Santhal was a President of the Kishan Sabha of Naxalbari-Hatighisha region at the time he still protested against them because he could not welcome the land issue or its distribution among the landless as a way to capture power. According to his comrade Kanu Sanyal this protest was what brought Santhal into the public eye as a peasant leader as well as the origin that started the Naxalbari uprising.

== Communist Party of India ==
Santhal joined the Communist Part of India in 1953. While a tenant farmer in 1951, Santhal met Comrade Chunilal Gowala, a milkman who inspired him to become a member of the undivided Communist Party of India. After hearing about the peasant movement and agrarian revolution Santhal was motivated to help in any way he could. What he learned from Gowala would continue to stay with Santhal, becoming the backbone of his ideological thinkings and help inspire him to organize and lead the Naxalbari uprising and the greater Naxalite movement afterwards. As the ideas and thoughts that originally attracted him to the Communist Party of India and political activities were muddied and divided by different parties and peoples, Santhal would ultimately become disheartened with the system and stop his political work.

== Political movement involvement ==
=== Jail Break Movement (1949–1950) ===
While in Nepal he got involved in the Chandragadi Jail Breaking Movement against Ranashahi which was jointly organized by the Nepali Congress and the Communist Party of Nepal. The goal was to force the government and get detainees out of jail; however, the movement failed, and people involved were tortured forcing Jangal to leave Nepal and go back to Naxalbari in 1950.

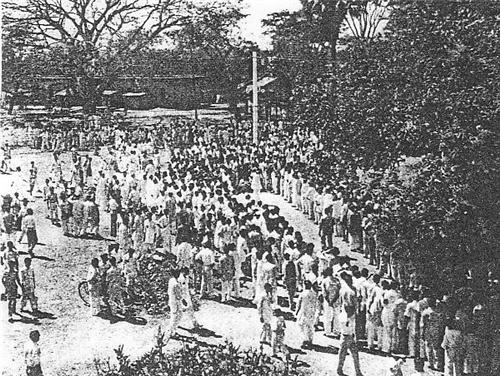
Tebhaga Movement- a sharecroppers' movement demanding two thirds of the produce from land for themselves

=== Tebhaga Movement (1952) ===
The Tebhaga movement was organised mainly by the communist cadres of the Kisan Sabah. The Tebhaga Movement was the first movement Santhal got involved in. In 1952 Santhal had a conflict with jotedar, Serket Sing of Hatighisa, about the tebhaga issue (movement to reduce the landlord share of land to one third). At the time, the landless sharecroppers who were doing the actual farming had to give up half of their harvest to the landlords. The sharecroppers only wanted to give up one third of their harvest to the landlords. Tebhaga means two thirds representing the sharecroppers wanting to keep two thirds of their harvest. The landholders refused to accept the terms dictated by their tenants and called in police causing many of the tebhaga activists arrested and jailed. The slogan Santhal and fellow leaders instilled was, "‘We may die by a bullet, but not by starving." The movement strengthened at times but, Santhal did not have a large organization of followers at the time; therefore, the conflict ended poorly as his followers were brutally beaten by Serket Sing and his associates. The state made great efforts to suppress the agricultural workers. During one of the rallies, peasants attempted to grab rifles from the police which resulted in the police firing and killing 11 people. They wanted to abolish the zamindari (feudal landlord) system which was unsuccessful. The Communist party was also involved and felt that things were getting out of hand and the party's state leadership called off the agitation. Police also threatened Communist Party leaders that they would take away their wives. The movement was significant because it was an early example of a peasant movement using violence as a political resistance tool as well as displaying unity across caste, gender, and religion. The Tebhaga Movement created a surge of woman power and womans defense units were set up. Leaders like Santhal continued to organize peasants and tea garden workers urging them grab excess land and revolt against exploitations by the landlords. The Naxalbari uprising was a continuation of the Tebhaga Movement which is where Santhal learned valuable lessons and organized plantation and agricultural workers.

=== Tea Garden Workers' Movement (1955) ===
The Tea Garden Workers' Movement started in Darjeeling. Santhal was around the tea garden workers daily and witnessed their struggles. Tea garden workers were exploited and tortured by joetedars on various occasions and Santhal helped to search for illegal land of the jotedars. Santhal also played important roles in the strike of the worker to demand payment bonuses for the workers. Santhal led a movement to remove a water blockade to help a farmer when an owner of the Chaupukhuria tea garden stopped supplying irrigation water to the farmer's land.

=== Naxalbari Uprising (1967) ===
The Naxalite movement of was named after the village of Naxalbari in West Bengal where it started. In West Bengal on 2 March 1967, a United Front Government was formed by the Communist Party of India (Marxist). On 18 March 1967, Santhal was part of a Peasants' Council in the Darjeeling district that resolved to re-distribute the land to the sharecroppers and prepare for an armed struggle against landlords. This council was in response to the United Front Government's formation, which the participants of the peasant's council saw as too moderate and a betrayal of the party vision. This led to peasants across the area gradually rising up against their oppressive landlords and establishing their own revolutionary committees, thereby giving themselves political power. By May 1967, it is estimated that they could have been able to control the Phansidewa, Kharibari, and Naxalbari regions of the Darjeeling district. The rebellion came to a head when a young sharecropper of the Naxalbari region was attacked by men sent by his landlord on 2 March. The response to this was that sharecroppers and peasants across the region started violently and forcibly take back their land; Jangal Santhal the primary leader and organizer of this uprising. When a police party headed by inspector Sonam Wangdi arrived to arrest some peasant leaders, they were ambushed by Santhal's group armed with bows and arrows. In the ensuing conflict nine members of Sangal's group were killed and Sonam Wangdi and two other officers were injured in the attack. Wangdi died two days later. On 25 May 1967, the police, in an act of retaliation, fired on a large crowd and ended up killing ten people, seven of which were women and two who were children. The CPI (M) after much deliberation denounced the violence in Naxalbari, from both the peasants and the police, and ordered extensive police action in Naxalbari to stop the revolt. The extensive police operations began on 12 July, and the United Front Government stamped out the rebellion after 72 days. This included the barring of Jangal Santhal's family from working in order to stop them from providing for themselves so they may starve. Santhal was arrested in at some point that same year and was released in 1969.

== Other important figures in the Naxalbari uprising ==
=== Kanu Sanyal ===
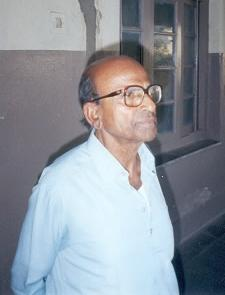
Kanu Sanyal

Kanu Sanyal was a comrade to Santhal. He was a leader in the Tebhaga Movement and badly beaten like Santhal. Kanu Sanyal initiated the Naxalbari uprising in which Santhal supported and joined. After Charu Majumdar's death Sanyal wanted to blame the Naxalbari Uprising's failure on him which Santhal did not support even though they were very close. Sanyal committed suicide on 23 March 2010.

=== Charu Majumdar ===
Charu Majumdar was a founder and chief theoretician of the Naxalite movement. Charu Mazumdar was inspired by early Naxalite leaders as well as by the success of Mao Zedong of China. Majumdar used Mao's ideas in the context of West Bengla and framed strategies to suit his surroundings to overthrow the ruling elite. He was born in a progressive landlord family and a son of an active freedom fighter. He joined Tebhaga movement in 1946 before Santhal. The Communist Party of India (M-L) was initially led by Charu Mazumdar, until his murder by the police in a torture prison in Kolkata (Calcutta) in 1972.

== Communist Party of India (Marxist-Leninist) ==
Communist Party of India (Marxist–Leninist) FLAG

Because of the violence and negative attention the Naxalbari Uprising had brought to the Communist Party of India (Marxist), the party leadership dispelled many members who participated or supported the uprising, with more members leaving on their own. Many of these expelled members went on to create the Communist Party of India (Marxist-Leninist) on 22 April 1969, and Jangal Santhal was present for its creation. In January 1970 he was given membership to the Provincial Committee of the Communist Party of India (Marxist-Leninist) at the West Bengal State Conference. Today Comrade Jangal Santhal is still recognized as a legendary leader by the Communist Party of India (Marxist-Leninist) Liberation.

== Arrest and death (1970–1977) ==
Santhal was arrested in July 1970, starting in Darjeeling jail and then moved to Alipur Central Jail. While in jail, he was an enthusiastic leader of all the struggles of Naxalite prisoners. While in prison, the government offered to release all Naxalite prisoners if they joined the masses and gave up their ideal of armed revolution. Santhal and other leaders turned down this request. On 31 July 1972, while Jangal Santhal was in prison, the Communist Party of India (Marxist-Leninist) was formally dissolved. Santhal was released in 1977, but found himself isolated. He wanted to revive the Naxalabri movement but became frustrated with things not gaining attention like they did before. Kanu Sanyal wanted to blame Comrade Charu Mazumdar for the failure of the Naxalbari uprising, but Santhal did support this idea. Not much is known of his life after his release from prison until his death. Santhal suffered from depression and alcoholism. He died of public shame and disgrace, never getting to see his country change for the better. He died on 4 December 1988.

== Reputation and legacy ==
According to peasants and tea garden workers, Santhal was an adored leader. He displayed courage, dedication, unparalleled discipline, and hard work. Santhal is acknowledged as a founder of today's tea garden workers movement. Santhal loved to work hard doing unpleasant tasks. In the 1950s when Santhal was badly beaten in the movement demanding tebhaga in the land of landlord Sherket Singh, he became more determined to organize peasants in the terai region. He was an advocate for the suffering people. For instance, he voiced his opinion against the distribution of illegal landed property in the conference of the KrishakSabha held in 1959. Santhal was not a traditional leader in the way that he related to the people. His whole family has been a victim of political activities. In a caste-ridden society like India, the rise of Santhal as a leader is uncommon in the historiography of India because of his lower-class origin. He sympathized with the peasants because he was around them daily and saw their struggles. “In spite of any proper ideological training or association with any Marxist leader comrade Jangal soon earned reputation as a leader and gradually turned into a leading figure in the party due to his extra-ordinary commitment and unparallel sympathy for the poverty-stricken people of his locality. In no time he became a symbol of ‘class struggle.” He was recognized by being given a membership in the Provincial Committee of the CPI (ML). According to Comrade Souren Basu, one of the prominent figures of Naxalbari movement, Santhal always showed what knowledge and wisdom stand for in the way that the steps and principles he used were based on reality and not on any theory. Despite the destruction of the Naxalite movement, Santhal helped create a shift in goals, strategy, and constituency setting the movement apart from previous peasant movements. The goal of a radical political transformation of peasant history and identity, from a class-in-itself into a class-for-itself became clear. The Naxalbari uprising inspired hundreds of urban revolutionaries to leave their careers, education, and work to spread the movement. Today, Naxalbari is more like a town (It has roads, schools, even a college) than a village, and is no longer deprived. Landlords did not like Santhal and described him as a cruel, devilish, murderous villain. Although Santhal is often associated with the violence of the Naxalbari uprising and the death of Sonam Wangdi, he didn't actually support the idea of khatamline, or the use of violence for the purpose of political gain. The Naxalbari uprising was actually inspired by Mao's ideology and strategy of guerilla warfare.

Although many praise Jangal Santhal for his work and focus on peasant tribal movements as they try to carve out a voice for themselves, this also plays into the reason why he is so often forgotten, as well as his dislike of unnecessary violence. As the Naxalite movement spread and fragmented into a multitude of subgroups with different views on topics such as violence, those groups did their best to wipe the original, non-violent, ideological origins of the movement. Due to that, memorials and the like around India, and Naxalbari specifically, for people like Jangal Santhal and his comrade Kanu Sanyal are non-existent, and their history has been largely forgotten.
