= Historic Eight Documents =

Political documents

The Historic Eight Documents are a set of eight monographs authored by the Indian Maoist revolutionary Charu Majumdar that outline the ideological principles on which the Naxalite militant communist movement in India was based. They laid down the idea that the Indian State was a bourgeois institution and that the main Indian communist parties had embraced revisionism by agreeing to operate within the framework of the Constitution of India. They urged a Maoist protracted people's war to overthrow the Indian State. They denounced the Soviet Union both for being revisionist, as well as for supporting the Indian State.

== Composition ==
- 28 January 1965 (1st document) - Our Tasks in the Present Situation
- 1965 (2nd document) - Make the People's Democratic Revolution Successful by Fighting Against Revisionism
- 9 April 1965 (3rd document) - What is the Source of the Spontaneous Revolutionary Outburst in India?
- 1965 (4th document) - Carry on the Struggle Against Modern Revisionism
- 1965 (5th document) - What Possibility The Year 1965 is Indicating?
- 8 December 1966 (6th document) - The Main Task Today is the Struggle to Build Up the True Revolutionary Party Through Uncompromising Struggle Against Revisionism
- 1966 (7th document) - Take this Opportunity to Build armed partisan struggle by fighting against revisionism
- April 1967 (8th document) - Carry Forward the Peasant Struggle by Fighting Revisionism

== Impact and commentary ==
Both communist and non-communist sources describe these monographs as a significant inspiring factor for the Naxalbari uprising in 1967.

== See also ==
- Naxalite
- Parliamentary cretinism
