= K. Ramakrishna =

Indian politician

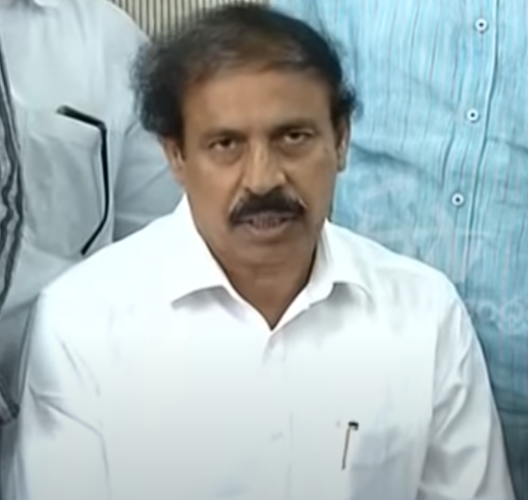
- Ramakrishna in a press meet

Secretary of the Communist Party of India, Andhra Pradesh State Council
- Incumbent
- Assumed office 23 May 2014

Member of the Andhra Pradesh Legislative Assembly
- In office 1994–1999
- Preceded by: Bodimalla Narayana Reddy
- Succeeded by: B. Narayana Reddy
- Constituency: Anantapur

Personal details
- Born: 16 January 1957 (age 69) Penumur,Andhra Pradesh, India
- Party: Communist Party of India

K. Ramakrishna (born 16 January 1957) is an Indian politician and leader of Communist Party of India (CPI). He was elected as a member of Andhra Pradesh Legislative Assembly from Anantapur in 1994. He was elected as secretary of CPI Andhra Pradesh State Council in May 2014.
