= Anantapur Assembly constituency =

Defunct Legislative Assembly constituency in Andhra Pradesh, India

Coordinates: 14.67°N 77.60°E

Anantapur
- Former constituency for the Andhra Pradesh Legislative Assembly

Constituency details
- Country: India
- Region: South India
- State: Andhra Pradesh
- District: Anantapur
- Lok Sabha constituency: Anantapur
- Established: 1951
- Abolished: 2008
- Reservation: None

Anantapur Assembly constituency was an assembly constituency of the Madras Legislative Assembly until 1953 and of the Andhra Pradesh Legislative Assembly, India after 1953. It was one of constituencies in the Anantapur district.

== Overview ==
It was part of Anantapur Lok Sabha constituency.

Constituency Details of Anantapur Assembly constituency:

- Country: India.
- State: Andhra Pradesh.
- District: Anantapur district.
- Region: Rayalaseema.
- Seat: Unreserved.
- Eligible Electors as per 2019 General Elections: 2,55,682 Eligible Electors. Male Electors: 1,26,711. Female Electors: 1,28,924.

== Members of Legislative Assembly ==
=== Madras State ===
| Year | Member | Political party |
|---|---|---|
| 1952 | T. Nagi Reddy | Communist Party of India |

=== Andhra State ===
| Year | Member | Political party |
|---|---|---|
| 1955 | P. Anthony Reddy | Indian National Congress |

=== Andhra Pradesh ===
| Year | Member | Political party |
|---|---|---|
| 1962 | P. Anthony Reddy | Indian National Congress |
| 1967 | T. Pallem Venkatesan | Communist Party of India (Marxist) |
| 1972 | Anantha Venkatareddy | Indian National Congress |
| 1978 | B. T. L. N. Chowary | Indian National Congress |
| 1983 | D. Narayanaswamy | Telugu Desam Party |
| 1985 | N. Ramakrishna | Telugu Desam Party |
| 1989 | Bodimalla Narayana Reddy | Indian National Congress |
| 1994 | K. Ramakrishna | Communist Party of India |
| 1999 | Bodimalla Narayana Reddy | Indian National Congress |
| 2004 | Bodimalla Narayana Reddy | Indian National Congress |

== Election results ==
=== 2004 ===
2004 Andhra Pradesh Legislative Assembly election: Anantapur
| Party | Candidate | Votes | % | ±% |
|---|---|---|---|---|
| INC | Bodimalla Narayana Reddy | | | |
| Majority | | | | |
| Turnout | | | | |
| INC hold | | Swing | | |

== See also ==
- List of constituencies of the Andhra Pradesh Legislative Assembly
