= Shiv Kumar Mishra =

Indian politician (1916 - 2007)

Shiv Kumar Mishra ji (1916 - 12 December 2007) was born in Unnao, lived in Kanpur, and led the Uttar Pradesh State Committee of Communist Party of India (Marxist) as a member of its Central Committee at the time of the outbreak of the Naxalite movement. Thereafter he sided with Charu Majumdar and played a prominent role in the formation of the Communist Party of India (Marxist-Leninist).
