= Bihardar =

Village in Jaunpur, Uttar Pradesh, India

Bihardar is a village in Jaunpur, Uttar Pradesh, India.
