= Kucheipadar tribal movement =

Kucheipadar, a village in Kashipur subdivision, Rayagada district, Orissa (now Odisha) in India, became famous for its well-known tribal movement opposing the mining proposals made by the Utkal Alumina International Limited (UAIL) in the region which started in 1996. In the mid-1990s, large deposits of bauxite (from which aluminum is produced) were discovered in the area, simultaneously private companies were given leases of the land by the government without proper consultations. The local tribal residents became aware of the project when in 1996 the UAIL project team went there to conduct a survey. Utmost confusion about the nature of the project, its impact on regional livelihood and the future of residents led the tribals to organise a civil disobedience campaign. The movement later spread to the entire region of Kashipur.

== Origins ==
The Orissa state is rich in bauxite ores, forests and tribal population. The tribal communities in the region are mostly isolated and conservative about preserving their traditional livelihood. They have no legal ownership of their land as they are isolated from modernisation so for them no compensatory mechanism is available. In 1992, the Orissa mining corporation was licensed to lease the bauxite mining sites to private corporate companies. UAIL was established through a joint venture in 1993. The government had signed a memorandum of understanding with various national and international companies in 1990s only for bauxite mining. The bauxite mines are mainly located in tribal regions. The UAIL project had acquired 2,800 acres (1,100 ha) of land in 1995. In February 1996, UAIL conducted a mass meeting near Kucheipadar to inform the tribals which was attended by 6,000 villagers from three panchayats. The villagers submitted a memorandum to the officials according to their quarries. When there was no response from the officials the local tribals organised themselves into an organisation named "Prakutika Sampada Suraksha Parishad"(PSSP) (English: Natural Resource Protection Committee).

== The movement ==
In February, 1996, a huge rally was organised in Kucheipadar by the tribals. In June, the UAIL started land acquisition without further negotiation. The PSSP organised a protest in front of UAIL office with around 10,000 tribal people. When the UAIL didn't respond, they started obstructing any further activity of the company in the region. July 1997, UAIL started proposed constructions displacing the local residents. In November, the people of Kashipur submitted a referendum to Orissa Chief Minister. PSSP led a protest of 5,000 people demanding withdrawal of UAIL. It conducted a referendum over UAIL in October and November 1998 across 40 villages. About 96 percent of the people rejected the mining project. Some armed tribals abducted three company employees and one government official to Kucheipadar village and forced them to join the protest. This resulted in UAIL to postpone the project till 2000. In 2000, several armed mass rallies were organised by the tribal against UAIL. Rallies were organised against Utkal Rural Development Society (URDS), Bharatiya Janata Party, Bharatiya Janata Dal (BJD). On 15 December 2000, around 4,000 tribal activists blocked the All-Party committee meeting and the BJD officials from entering Maikanch village. The next day, police entered the village and killed three people. On 20 December 2000, 20,000 tribal people protested against the police firing.

== After 2000 ==
UAIL decided to reduce activities related to project work and started to work on rehabilitation and resettlement. In 2004, demonstrations were held against UAIL in Dama Karol village. In 2006, the tribals held a rally remembering the villagers killed on 15 December 2000, attended by Medha Patkar. In February 2007, tribals raised black flag against Orissa government for not fulfilling their demands of withdrawal of Ithe project.

== In popular culture ==
1. Tribal protest songs from Kucheipadar had been featured in albums like the one made by Word Sound Power.

2. Award-winning videos created.

3. Filmmakers, actors and singers have raised voice against arrest of tribal activist.

== See also ==
- Kashipur, Rayagada
