= Shamsher Singh Sheri =

- Born: 1942
- Died: 30 October 2005
- Occupation: Communist leader
- Organization: Communist Party of India (Maoist)

Shamsher Singh Sheri (1942 – 30 October 2005), commonly known by his nom de guerre, Karam Singh (Hindi pronunciation: [krm sɪŋɦ]), was a communist leader and a Politburo member of the CPI (Maoist) in India.

== Early life and family ==
Sheri was born in the village of Khokhar Kalan, in the Sangrur district, Punjab. Soon after his birth his father died. He belonged to a middle class family. He had six brothers and three sisters. Sheri was married to Harbans Kaur in 1957. Sheri has two children. The elder one, Krantipal Singh, an artist by training but engaged in farming; while the younger one Sachinder Pal Singh Pali, an M. Phil holder in economics from Panjab University, is associated with Students for Society, a student organization of Panjab University.

== Guerrilla life ==
Sheri joined the Communist Party of India (Marxist-Leninist) and went underground 1969-1970. He took active part in the armed struggle of the party.

In 1974 he joined the Punjab Communist Revolutionary Committee of Harbhajan Sohi, which merged into the UCCRI(ML) in 1976. In 1979 the Punjab State Committee formed a parallel UCCRI(ML).

After its 1992 conference, RCCI(ML) split in 1995. Sheri became the Secretary of one of the factions, Revolutionary Communist Centre of India (Maoist). He was re-elected as Secretary at the RCCI(M) conferences in 1996 and 2002. Sheri took active part in the setting up of CCOMPOSA.

In January 2003 RCCI(M) merged with the Maoist Communist Centre, which became the Maoist Communist Centre of India. Sheri became a Central Committee member of MCCI. After the merger of MCCI into the Communist Party of India (Maoist) in 2004, Sheri became a member of the Central Committee (Provisional) of the new party. Sheri also became a Politburo member of the CPI (Maoist).

== Death ==
Singh suffered from cerebral malaria and jaundice. He died on 30 October 2005.
