= Communist Party of India (Marxist–Leninist) Naxalbari =

Communist party

- Abbreviation: CPI (M–L) Naxalbari
- Founder: S. A. Rawoof
- Founded: 1998
- Dissolved: 2014
- Split from: Communist Party of India (Marxist–Leninist) Red Flag
- Merged into: Communist Party of India (Maoist)
- Political position: Far-left
- International affiliation: CCOMPOSA; RIM
- Colors: Red

Communist Party of India (Marxist–Leninist) Naxalbari was an underground Maoist political party in India. The party was founded in 1998, following the expulsion of S. A. Rawoof from the Communist Party of India (Marxist–Leninist) Red Flag, on the basis of the erstwhile Andhra Pradesh and Karnataka party units of CPI(ML) Red Flag. CPI(ML) Naxalbari was in contact with the Maoist Unity Centre, CPI(ML) (which had been formed by the remnants of the Central Reorganisation Committee, Communist Party of India (Marxist–Leninist)), and in 1999 MUC, CPI(ML) merged into CPI(ML) Naxalbari. S. A. Rawoof led the CPI(ML) Naxalbari as its secretary until resigning in 2006 due to old age. Kannamballi Murali ('Ajith') took over post of party secretary after S. A. Rawoof.

CPI(ML) Naxalbari were members of Revolutionary Internationalist Movement and Coordination Committee of Maoist Parties and Organizations of South Asia. The RIM membership was inherited from CRC, CPI (ML), which was one of three founding organisations of RIM. CPI(ML) Naxalbari advocated armed struggle and they only recognised groups such as Communist Party of India (Maoist) as truly communist.

On 1 May 2014 the merger of CPI(ML) Naxalbari into the CPI (Maoist) was publicly announced.

== See also ==
- List of Naxalite and Maoist groups in India
