= Kashipur, Rayagada =

Kashipur
- Small Township
- Location in Odisha, India Kashipur (India)
- Coordinates: 19°22′00″N 83°08′00″E
- Country: India
- State: Odisha
- District: Rayagada

Government
  - Type: Democratic

Languages
  - Official: Odia
- Time zone: UTC+5:30 (IST)
- PIN: 765015
- Vehicle registration: OD
- Website: odisha.gov.in

Kashipur is a block and tehsil in Rayagada district in the Indian state of Odisha. It is known for the Utkal Aluminium International Limited (UAIL)

== History ==
A civil unrest incident occurred on 1 December 2004, when the police led an attack on a demonstration in the village of Kucheipadar, near the proposed aluminum plant of Utkal Alumina International Limited at Doraguda.

== Geography ==
Kashipur is 75 km (47 mi) west of Rayagada, and 452 km (281 mi) from Bhubaneswar. The district headquarters of the Kalahandi district is approximately 65 km (40 mi) from the main township.

== Transport ==
The nearest railway station is at Tikiri and the nearest airport is Jeypore.

It is connected by road to the major cities and towns of Odisha and Bhawanipatna Multiple options connect other cities of south Odisha, such as, Koraput, Brahmapur and Nabarangpur.

Kashipur is surrounded by dense forests, and numerous cliffs, providing natural resources and scenic beauty. Cherkata waterfall is about 10 km (6.2 mi) from the township. Derakona waterfall is around 20 km (12 mi) away in the densely forested Sunger area, a proposed site of L&T Ltd. factories.

== Offices ==
Government facilities include:

- Block Headquarters office
- Police Station (Thana)
- Tahasil Office
- Post Office
- Community Health Centre (CHC)

== Religion ==
- Lord Jagannath temple at the King's old palace.
- Maa Manikeswari temple
- Maa Thakurani temple
- Lord Shiva temple
- Lord Hanuman Temple

== Festivals ==
Ratha Yatra (The Cart Festival) attracts around 50,000 people celebrated in the Hindu month of Ashadha (mid June – mid July).

During October, Dusshera Puja is celebrated. On the day of Vijayadashami there is a tradition of Lakha Mara (adopted for Maa Manikeswari from Kalahandi's tradition)

Other festivals include Maha Shivaratri, Dipavali and Holi.

== Demography ==
Jhodia, Kondha make up the majority of the 11,809 residents as per 2011 census, Odia is the predominant language. The total Block population is around 73,000.
