= Chandra Pulla Reddy =

Indian communist leader

Chandra Pulla Reddy (1917 – 9 November 1984, Calcutta) was an Indian communist leader.

== Biography ==
Chandra Pulla Reddy was born in 1917 at Velugodu village in what is currently the Kurnool district of Andhra Pradesh. A leading activist in Indian freedom struggle as a student of Guindy Engineering College of the then Madras (present Chennai) against British colonial rule. He was dismissed from the college. Later he became the Kurnool district secretary of the then united Communist Party of India (CPI). Later he became the editor of the party organ Janasakthi.

C.P. Reddy became one of the main leaders of the Andhra Pradesh Coordination Committee of Communist Revolutionaries. Reddy began organising armed struggles in the Khammam and Warangal areas, without the approval of the APCCCR leadership. Reddy then conducted self-criticism. In December 1969, the APCCCR leadership was arrested. In their absence Reddy strengthened his role inside the organisation. The leadership sent a letter of criticism from jail against the line implemented by Reddy. Effectively the organisation faced a split, with Reddy leading his own APCCR as of 1971.

In 1975 his group merged with the CPI (ML) led by Satyanarayan Singh. In 1980, he broke away from the party, forming a CPI (ML).

He died on 9 November 1984 at Calcutta due to a massive heart attack.

His Selected Writings consists, so far, of seven volumes. More are to come.
