= Naxalbari uprising =

Armed uprising in India

Naxalbari Uprising
- Part of the Cold War and the Naxalite-Maoist insurgency
- The South Asian communist banner
| Date | 1967 |
| Location | Naxalbari, Darjeeling, West Bengal |
| Result | Indian Government victory: Armed rebellion suppressed; Beginning of the Naxalite-Maoist insurgency |

Belligerents
| India: West Bengal Police; Supported by: Communist Party of India (Marxist); Bangla Congress | All India Coordination Committee of Communist Revolutionaries: All India Kisan Sabha; Local peasantry |

Commanders and leaders
| (India) Indira Gandhi (India) Ajoy Kumar Mukherjee (India) Jyoti Basu (India) Hare Krishna Konar | Charu Majumdar; Kanu Sanyal; Jangal Santhal; Shanti Munda |

Units involved
| Indian Police Service; West Bengal Police | Siliguri group Darjeeling group |

Casualties and losses
| 1 police officer died | 11 rebels died |

The Naxalbari uprising was an armed peasant revolt in 1967 in the Naxalbari block of Siliguri subdivision in Darjeeling district, West Bengal, India. It was mainly led by tribals and the radical communist leaders of Bengal and further developed into the Communist Party of India (Marxist–Leninist) in 1969. The armed struggle led to the birth of Naxalism and the beginning of the Naxalite–Maoist insurgency, which rapidly spread from West Bengal to other states of India, and continues to this day.

== Origins ==
The uprising occurred during the height of the Sino-Soviet split, which was causing turmoil within the communist organisations in India and the rest of the world. The leader and ideologue of the uprising Charu Majumdar theorised that the situation was appropriate for launching an armed People's war in India following the Chinese Communist Revolution, Vietnam War and Cuban Revolution. Charu Majumdar wrote the Historic Eight Documents which became the foundation of the Naxalite movement in 1967.

== Timeline ==
The communists in 1965-66 already controlled territory in the Naxalbari region. The so-called "Siliguri group" called for initiating an armed struggle, which started the uprising. Many peasant cells were created throughout the region. On 3 March 1967 just a day after the united front had sworn in ministers in West Bengal, some 150 peasants armed with bows and spears, took 300 maunds of paddy or around 11000 kg of paddy and started seizing land. The peasants were enraged that the Communist Party of India (Marxist) (CPI(M)) did not retain workers in the party. By 18 March the peasants started seizing land from jotedars (landlords who owned large plots of land in the region). Peasant committees were set up throughout the region within four months. The first clash occurred between the peasants and landlords when a share-cropper, Bigul Kisan, was beaten up by landlord gentries. Following this, peasant committees seized land, foodgrains and arms from the landlord gentries, leading to violent clashes. The government started mobilizing the police forces to deal with the uprising.

The inspector of Jharugaon village was killed by peasant committee members. In retaliation, the police opened fire which resulted in the death of nine women and one child on 25 May 1967. By June the peasant committees gained hold in the regions around Naxalbari, Kharibari and Phansidewa seizing lands, ammunition and food grains from the jotedars. The tea garden workers around the Darjeeling region participated in strikes supporting the peasant committees. The upheaval sustained till 19 July when the paramilitary forces were sent by the government. Leaders like Jangal Santhal were arrested. Some of them like Charu Majumdar went underground. And others like Tribheni Kanu, Sobham, Ali Gorkha Majhi, and Tilka Majhi were killed.

== Recognition and aftermath ==
The relations between the Chinese Communist Party (CCP) with the CPI(M) deteriorated following CCP's support of the uprising. Many members of the CPI(M) who supported the uprising were expelled, such as Charu Majumdar, Souren Bose, Mahadeb Mukherjee and Dilip Bagchi. Expelled communists later on organised themselves into one organisation, the All India Coordination Committee of Communist Revolutionaries (AICCCR), which later developed into the CPI(ML). CPI(ML) remained the centre of the Naxalite movement till 1975. A large number of enthusiastic youth joined the movement. Although the uprising was suppressed, it remained a landmark in Indian politics which led to several other similar kinds of movements in parts of Bihar and began the ongoing Naxalite–Maoist insurgency.

== See also ==
- Kucheipadar tribal movement
- 1970 Bhojpur uprising
- Lal Sena
- Srikakulam peasant uprising
