= K. Venu (Kerala) =

Indian writer and activist

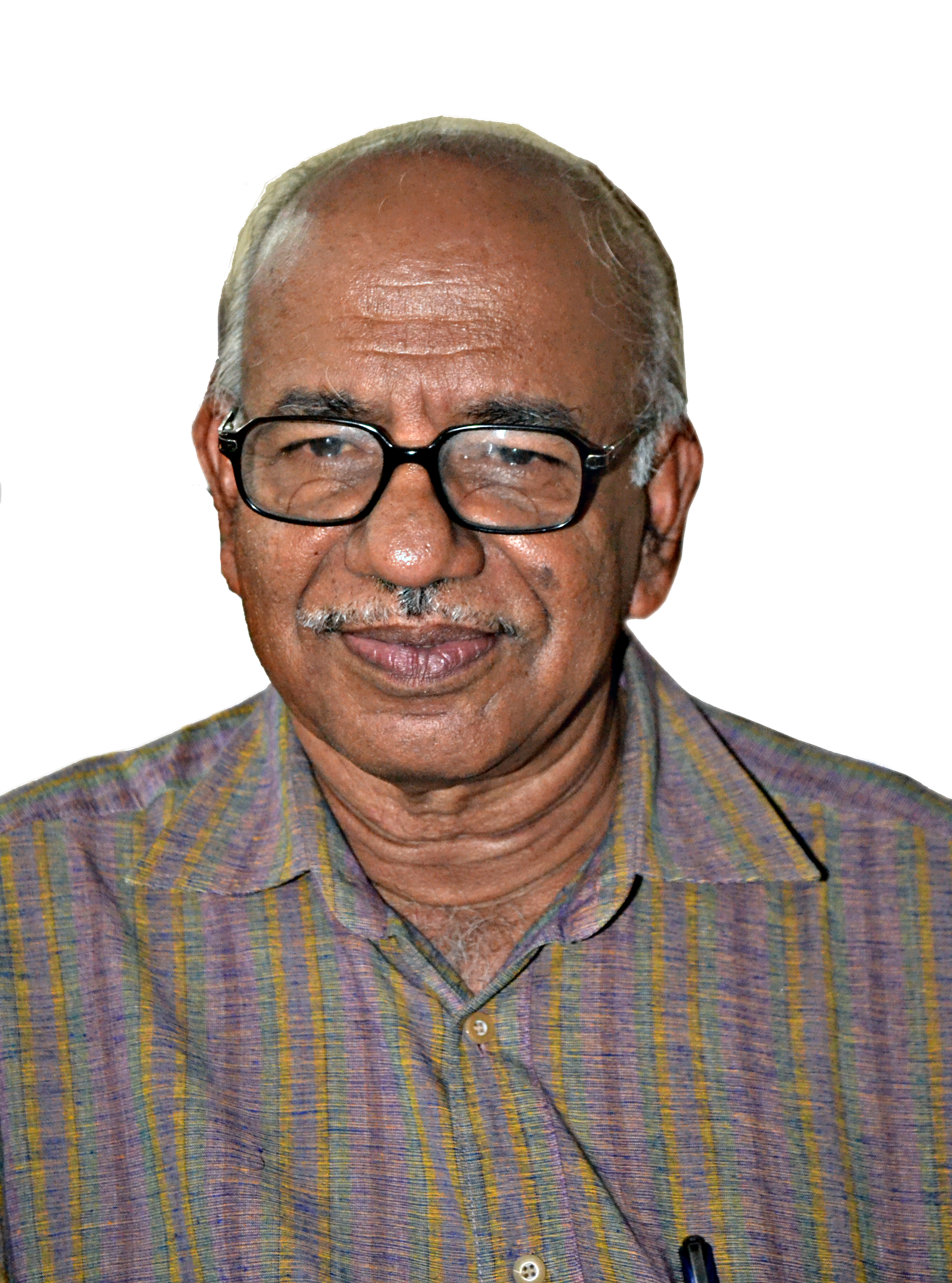
- Venu in 2012
- Born: K. Venugopal; 10 December 1945 (age 80); Pullut, Kodungallur, Kerala, India
- Occupations: Writer; orator
- Years active: 1970–present
- Children: 2

K. Venugopal (born 10 December 1945), better known as K. Venu, is an Indian social commentator, writer, and activist from Kerala. He served in the Indian Communist (Naxalite) movement from 1970 to 1991 and has been a social activist since. He is now prominent as an author and columnist in newspapers and periodicals.

== Amnesty International ==
In 2016, he supported Amnesty International in the controversy against ABVP.

== Bibliography ==
His major works include:

- Prapanchavum Manushyanum
- Viplavathinte Darshanika Prasnangal
- Swathanthryathinte Sakshalkaram
- Kerala Padanathinoru Mukhavura
- Indian Viplavathinte Kazhchapad
- Oru Communistukarante Janadhipathya Sankalpam
- Oru Janadhipathyavadiyude Veenduvicharangal
- Indian Janadhipathyam Prasnangalum Sadhyathakalum
- Janadhipathyathinte Manushyanubhavangal
