= Punjab Communist Revolutionary Committee =

The Punjab Communist Revolutionary Committee, originally part of the Bhatinda District Committee of AICCCR, was one of the sections that broke away when AICCCR founded the CPI(M-L). In June 1976, the PCRC merged with UCCRI(ML).

== See also ==
- Wahikar Union
