= Unity Centre of Communist Revolutionaries of India (Marxist–Leninist) (D.V. Rao) =

Unity Centre of Communist Revolutionaries of India (Marxist-Leninist) is a political party in Andhra Pradesh, India. It was formed by D.V. Rao after the 1980 general elections, as a split from the original Unity Centre of Communist Revolutionaries of India (Marxist-Leninist). D.V. Rao had been the Central Committee Secretary of UCCRI(ML). However, differences had emerged on issues like how to relate to developments in China after the death of Mao Zedong. D.V. Rao maintained that China under Deng Xiaoping remained a socialist state.

Today the party is led by Arika Gumpaswamy.

== See also ==
- List of Naxalite and Maoist groups in India
