= Unity Centre of Communist Revolutionaries of India (Marxist–Leninist) (Harbhajan Sohi) =

- Abbreviation: Sohi Faction of UCCRI(ML)
- Leader: Harbhajan Sohi
- Founder: Harbhajan Sohi
- Founded: September 20, 1979
- Dissolved: 1988
- Split from: UCCRI(ML)
- Merged into: Centre of Communist Revolutionaries of India
- Ideology: Communism; Marxism-Leninism; Anti-Revisionism; Hoxhaism
- Political position: Far-Left

Unity Centre of Communist Revolutionaries of India (Marxist-Leninist) [Harbhajan Sohi], a splinter group of UCCRI(ML). Since July 1977 the UCCRI(ML) Central Committee Member from Punjab, Harbhajan Sohi had started to express criticism towards the Three Worlds Theory of the Chinese Communist Party.

Gradually he got closer to the positions of the Albanian Party of Labour. In January 1979 the Punjab State Committee of UCCRI(ML) submitted a document to the Central Committee on the issue. The majority of the CC responded by producing a document titled "In Support of Differentiation of Three Worlds Theory" in April the same year. On 20 September the split was a fact, and the Punjab State Committee formed a parallel UCCRI(ML).

In 1982 the UCCRI(ML) led by Harbhajan Sohi was divided in two, and a parallel Unity Centre of Communist Revolutionaries of India (Marxist-Leninist) (Ajmer group).

In November 1986 the group took the initiative to form the Front against Repression and Communalism together with the Communist Party of India (Marxist–Leninist) Central Team, to combat Khalistani terrorism and state repression.

The UCCRI(ML) of Harbhajan Sohi was integral in the formation of the Centre of Communist Revolutionaries of India in 1988.

== See also ==
- List of anti-revisionist groups
