= Souren Bose =

Indian politician

Personal details
- Born: 25 June 1924
- Died: 17 August 1997 (aged 73) Mumbai
- Party: Communist Party of India (Marxist-Leninist)
- Occupation: Author

Souren Bose (25 June 1924 – 17 August 1997) was one of the founders of the Naxalite movement in India and an influential figure in the Communist Party of India (Marxist) (CPI(M)). At the congress of the CPI(M) in 1967 he questioned the absence of a portrait of Mao Zedong at the conference venue. When the Communist Party of India (Marxist-Leninist) was formed, he joined the new party.

Bose travelled to China, and was one of very few Indian Maoists that had direct meetings with the Chinese leadership. When he returned to India he presented the criticisms raised by the Chinese towards the line of the CPI(ML), but was cornered by the CPI(ML) leader Charu Majumdar. His dialogue with Zhou Enlai have been published as a pamphlet.
