= Adibhatla Kailasam =

Indian communist leader

Adibhatla Kailasam was an Indian communist leader. Kailasam was one of the original leaders of the Srikakulam peasant uprising. Kailasam came from a landlord family of Kaarivalasa village in Srikakulam, Andhra Pradesh.After the abolition of inamdars, Kailasam led the peasants to the protracted legal battle against his father and gained the rights on the lands to the tenants. He worked as a teacher in an aided school which was owned by his family. His father got angry with the politics of Kailasam and waited for an opportunity to remove him from the job . The opportunity came in the form of 1955 general elections to Madras assembly. Kailasam addressed a public gathering in the communist election meeting. Citing this reason, his father dismissed him from the job. However, Kailasam challenged the order in the Hon'ble High court and got favourable orders.Kailsam didn't join the job and became whole timer to the undivided communist party. During the war with chaina the communist leaders were arrested and in that stream of arrests He was also arrested and only after the war He was released. After the split in communist party of India He sailed with new born CPI (M).In the subsequent splits He sailed with Communist Party of India (Marxist-Leninist). He became the secretary of the state committee of the party in 1970 and he was also elected to its central committee at the party congress in 1970.

In the early 1960s, Kailasam and his colleague Satyanaraya, began to organise tribal peasants in the Srikakulam area. The State authorities began the repressive measures on the movement. register criminal cases against the tribal people enmass .the moneylenders and business people and landlords trio resorted to physical violence and killed two Adivasis named Koranna and Manganna . It was a crucial turn in the movement and the subsequent splits happened in the due course of tactical approach of the movement . The CPI (M.L).decided to launch the armed struggle and rest is history.

On the specific tip of from the insider informant On 10th July 1970, the encounter took place at Bori Hills. Kailasam and Satyanarayan were shot dead on 10 July.
