= T. Nagi Reddy =

Indian politician

Tarimela Nagi Reddy
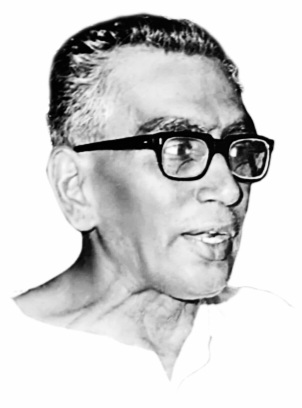
- Reddy in 1960s

2nd Leader of the opposition Andhra Pradesh Legislative Assembly
- In office 1962–1967
- Governor: Bhim Sen Sachar; Satyawant Mallannah Shrinagesh; Pattom A. Thanu Pillai
- Chief Minister: Neelam Sanjiva Reddy; Kasu Brahmananda Reddy
- Preceded by: Puchalapalli Sundarayya
- Succeeded by: Gouthu Latchanna

1st Leader of the opposition Madras State Legislative Assembly
- In office 6 May 1952–1 October 1953
- Governor: Krishna Kumarsinhji Bhavsinhji; Sri Prakasa
- Chief Minister: Kumaraswami Raja; C. Rajagopalachari
- Preceded by: Office Established
- Succeeded by: P. Ramamurthi
- Constituency: Anantapur

Member of Andhra Pradesh Legislative Assembly
- In office 1967–1972
- Preceded by: Ponnapati Antony Reddy
- Succeeded by: Anantha Venkata Reddy
- Constituency: Anantapur
- In office 1962–1967
- Preceded by: Tarimela Ramachandra Reddy
- Succeeded by: G. Sivaiah
- Constituency: Putloor

Member of Parliament, Lok Sabha
- In office 1957–1962
- Preceded by: Paidi Lakshmayya
- Succeeded by: Osman Ali S. Khan
- Constituency: Anantapur

Member of Andhra Legislative Assembly
- In office 1953–1955
- Preceded by: Himself as Madras MLA
- Succeeded by: P. Anthony Reddy
- Constituency: Anantapur

Member of Madras Legislative Assembly
- In office 1951–1953
- Preceded by: Constituency Established
- Succeeded by: Madras Assembly Divided
- Constituency: Anantapur

Personal details
- Born: 11 February 1917 Anantapuram, Madras Presidency, British India (now in Andhra Pradesh, India)
- Died: 28 July 1976 (aged 59) Osmania General Hospital, Hyderabad, Andhra Pradesh, India

Tarimela Nagi Reddy (11 February 1917 – 28 July 1976) was a communist politician from Andhra Pradesh, India. He was born in a wealthy family in Anantapur district of Andhra Pradesh. He completed his schooling from the Rishi Valley School India, founded by Andhra philosopher Jiddu Krishnamurti. He would later study at Loyola College in Chennai and at Banaras Hindu University in Varanasi. During his student days, he got involved with nationalism and Marxism. His political activities got him jailed in 1940, 1941 and 1946. He revolted against his father who was a landlord and donated his land of over 1000 acres to landless labourers.

Reddy was elected to the Madras Legislative Assembly as a Communist Party of India candidate in 1951 from Anantapuram. After the formation of Andhra State in 1953 he continued as Member of Legislative Assembly of Andhra State from 1953 to 1955. In 1955 election he contested from Putloor constituency and was defeated. He was elected to the Lok Sabha from Anantapuram in 1957. In 1962 he was elected to the Andhra Pradesh legislative assembly as a Communist Party of India candidate from Puttur. In 1967 he was again elected to the assembly, now as a Communist Party of India (Marxist) (CPI(M)) candidate from Anantapuram. Neelam Sanjeeva Reddy, a two-time Chief Minister of Andhra Pradesh and the sixth President of India, was Nagi Reddy's brother-in-law.

In 1968, T.N. Reddy broke with the CPI(M) and formed the Andhra Pradesh Coordination Committee of Communist Revolutionaries (APCCCR). He succeeded in attracting a large part of the CPI(M) cadre to APCCCR. During a brief period APCCCR was part of All India Coordination Committee of Communist Revolutionaries (AICCCR). Reddy was however very critical of the left adventurist line of Charu Majumdar. Instead, he wanted to promote a mass line. Thus, Reddy and the APCCCR were expelled from the AICCCR.

In 1975, Unity Centre of Communist Revolutionaries of India (Marxist-Leninist) was formed through the merger of the APCCCR with three other smaller groups. T.N. Reddy worked as a leader of APCCCR until his death in 1976. His most famous work is India Mortgaged.

Siblings: Tarimela Ranga Reddy, MLA and Samithi President Tarimela Krishna Reddy, Samithi President Tarimela Ramadoss Reddy, Communist leader.

== See also ==
- G. Raghava Reddy
