= Centre of Communist Revolutionaries of India =

Left political party in India

Centre of Communist Revolutionaries of India was formed in 1988 through the merger of the Anand and Harbhajan Sohi factions of UCCRI(ML), CPI(ML) Chandrashekar group, Revolutionary Communist Party and Organizing Committee, CPI(ML). The initiative was taken by the two UCCRI (ML) splinter groups.

On 30 July 1992, CCRI merged with six other groups and formed the Communist Party of India (Marxist Leninist) Janashakti or CPI (ML). the other groups are one faction of the Unity Centre of Communist Revolutionaries of India (Marxist-Leninist), CPI (ML) Agami Yug, Paila Vasudev Rao's CPI (ML), CPI (ML) [Khokan Majumdar Faction], Coordination Committee of Communist Revolutionaries (CCCR) and Communist Revolutionary Group for Unity (CRGU).
