= Andhra Pradesh Coordination Committee of Communist Revolutionaries =

Andhra Pradesh Coordination Committee of Communist Revolutionaries (APCCCR) was a leftist split from the Communist Party of India (Marxist) (CPI(M)) in the Indian state of Andhra Pradesh. The leader of the group was T. Nagi Reddy, who was a member of the legislative assembly in AP at the time. Other leading figures were D.V. Rao, Chandra Pulla Reddy and Kolla Venkaiah. Both Reddy and Rao had been active in the Telangana armed struggle, and Rao had formulated the "Andhra Thesis" of the Communist Party of India (CPI).

APCCCR split from CPI(M) after the CPI(M) Burdwan plenum in April 1968. When APCCCR split from CPI(M) 11 of 14 district committees of CPI(M) in Andhra Pradesh sided with APCCCR. Around 60% of the CPI(M) membership in the state, 8000 people (according to an estimate made by CPI(M) leader P. Sundarayya), went over to the T. Nagi Reddy group. They were also able to win over the CPI(M) publication Janashakti.

APCCCR was affiliated to the All India Coordination Committee of Communist Revolutionaries (AICCCR), but the group got expelled due to political differences. APCCCR advocated a mass line, whereas AICCCR denounced work in trade unions as "economism". APCCCR saw the issue of participating or boycotting elections as a tactical issue, whereas AICCCR saw as a strategic one. AICCCR accused APCCCR of lack of loyalty towards the Chinese Communist Party.

After the expulsion of APCCCR from AICCCR, AICCCR rapidly reorganized an Andhra branch, mainly drawing support from the Srikakulam region. The Srikakulam District Committee of APCCCR joined Communist Party of India (Marxist-Leninist) (CPI(ML)).

APCCCR launched limited armed struggles in Warangal, Khammam, Karimnagar, Nalgonda, East Godavari, etc. APCCCR favoured combining mass movements and armed struggle, and opposed the annihilation line of CPI(ML).

In April 1969 APCCCR issued a resolution called "Boycott Panchayat Elections - Establishing Village Soviets".

In December 1969 six out nine State Committee members of APCCCR were arrested at a hotel in Madras, among them T. Nagi Reddy and D.V. Rao. The arrests were a heavy blow for the organization. In July 1970 a new state committee led by Chandra Pulla Reddy was created.

APCCCR was later renamed as Andhra Pradesh Committee of Communist Revolutionaries (alt. Andhra Pradesh Revolutionary Communist Committee).

In 1971 APCCR suffered a severe split, with the Chandra Pulla Reddy-led group leaving the party. This group also used the name APCCR. This group merged with the Provisional Central Committee, Communist Party of India (Marxist-Leninist) of Satayanarayan Singh in 1973.

In 1975 APCCR formed Unity Centre of Communist Revolutionaries of India (Marxist-Leninist) together with Northern Zone Committee Revolutionary Communist Unity Centre (Marxist-Leninist), West Bengal Communist Unity Centre and West Bengal Co-ordination Committee of Revolutionaries (WBCCR).
