= Kanu Sanyal =

Indian communist politician (1932-2010)

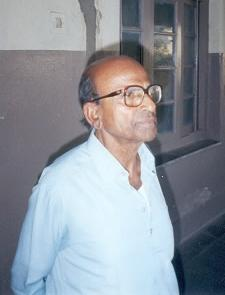
- Kanu Sanyal

General Secretary of CPI(ML) Class Struggle
- In office 2004–2009

Politburo Member of CPI(ML)
- In office 1969–1971

CPI(M) committee member for Darjeeling district
- In office 1965–1967

Personal details
- Born: Krishna Kumar Sanyal; 1932
- Died: 23 March 2010 (aged 78)
- Cause of death: Suicide
- Party: Class Struggle Group; Communist Party of India (Marxist-Leninist) (1969–1972)
- Known for: Naxalism
- Criminal information
- Criminal charge: Criminal conspiracy
- Penalty: Jailed (1970–1977)

Kanu Sanyal (1932 – 23 March 2010) was an Indian communist politician. In 1967, he was one of the main leaders of the Naxalbari uprising and in 1969 he was one of the founding leaders of Communist Party of India (Marxist-Leninist) (CPI (ML)). Sanyal died by suicide on 23 March 2010.

== Formation and growth of CPI (ML) ==
Kanu Sanyal joined communist politics, first as a member of CPI then CPI(M). He announced the formation of the original CPI (ML) on Vladimir Lenin's birthday in 1969 at a public rally in Calcutta. He came out with the seminal Terai report on revolution in India, which openly denounced the anarcho-nihilist policies of Charu Majumdar and his loyalists.

After the failure of the Naxalite uprising, Sanyal went into hiding. The death of his colleague Charu Majumdar was followed by the breakup of the Naxalite movement, and Sanyal is claimed to have abandoned violent means and accepted parliamentary practices as a form of revolutionary activity.

== Arrest and jail ==
He was eventually cornered and arrested in August 1970. News of his arrest sparked region-wide violence by radical communists. CPI(ML) cadres destroyed property, raided and attacked educational institutions, and engaged in rioting.

For seven years Sanyal was imprisoned in a jail in Visakhapatnam, Andhra Pradesh in a case known as the Parvatipuram Naxalite Conspiracy. He was convicted by a sessions court.

== Release and renewed political engagement ==
Sanyal was released from jail in 1977, following a change in government in New Delhi as well as in West Bengal. Jyoti Basu, the new CPI(M) chief minister, personally intervened to ensure Sanyal's release. By the time of his release, Sanyal had publicly condemned the original strategy of the armed struggle of the CPI(ML).

After his release, Sanyal rallied his supporters and formed the Organising Committee of Communist Revolutionaries (OCCR). He continued to attend CPI(M) all-party meetings until his death.

In 1985, Sanyal's faction, along with five other groups, merged to form the Communist Organisation of India (Marxist-Leninist), and Sanyal was appointed leader of the CPI(ML).

== Later years ==
In his later years, Sanyal continued his broad engagement in political activism, including the labour movement and land rights. For these activities he was arrested and detained several times.

On 18 January 2006, while protesting against a lockout of tea garden workers in the region, Sanyal and other fellow agitators were arrested for causing a train to be held up at the New Jalpaiguri Railway Station in Siliguri, North Bengal.

By late 2006, Sanyal had become a prominent figure in the opposition to land acquisition in Singur. On 8 December, he was arrested and detained along with three other Naxalite leaders after the police stopped and charged a demonstration.

== Death ==
On 23 March 2010, his body was found hanging at his residence at Seftullajote village, 25 km from Siliguri (West Bengal), where the Naxal movement had begun under his leadership. Sanyal was suffering from old-age related cardio-pulmonary ailments and his health had been failing since suffering a massive stroke in 2009. At the time of his death, he was the General Secretary of the new CPI(ML), formed by a merger of several splinter groups of the original party.

== Popular culture ==
Sanyal, as well as the Naxalite movement, was referenced in Jhumpa Lahiri's 2013 novel The Lowland.
