= Naxalism =

Communist ideology

Naxalism is the communist ideology of the Naxalites or Naxals, a grouping of political and insurgent groups from India. It is influenced by Maoist political sentiment and ideology.

Inspired by Maoism, Charu Majumdar wrote the Historic Eight Documents, which became the basis of Naxalism. Majumdar, Kanu Sanyal, and Jangal Santhal formed a faction of the Communist Party of India (Marxist) that called for a protracted people's war. The Naxalite–Maoist insurgency started after a 1967 uprising in the village of Naxalbari, West Bengal. The ideology takes its name from the village. After the uprising, Sanyal established the Communist Party of India (Marxist–Leninist). Majumdar's writings became popular in urban areas. As students in Kolkata began to join the Naxalite movement, Majumdar shifted the ideology's focus beyond rural areas. The Naxalites splintered into various groups supportive of Maoist ideology. Under the Unlawful Activities (Prevention) Act of India (1967), some Naxalite organisations are designated as terrorist groups.

Naxalism is based on the principle that there is a class conflict between agricultural workers and landowners and that the Constitution of India lacks protections for tribal workers. This ideology has been popular among the tribal groups present in India. Naxal groups have become authorities in areas they control, where they develop infrastructure, which gains support from residents. Naxalites have recruited youths, particularly those aligned with the working class. Naxalite groups are funded by taking money from profits of exploitative companies, especially mining companies, in areas they control.

== Etymology ==
The term Naxalite originated from the name of the village Naxalbari in West Bengal where an uprising of peasants occurred in 1967. The movement itself is referred to as "Naxalism" and the people engaged are termed as "Naxals" or "Naxalites". The term "Naxalism" is broadly applied to refer to all the communist insurgent movements. The groups are also commonly referred to as Maoists, as they are supportive of Maoist ideology.

== History ==
In 1967, a faction of the Communist Party of India (Marxist) (CPI-M) led by Charu Majumdar, Kanu Sanyal, and Jangal Santhal called the "Siliguri group" wanted a protracted people's war in India similar to the Chinese Communist Revolution and Majumdar wrote the Historic Eight Documents which became the foundation of the Naxalite movement. The party was part of a coalition government in West Bengal. Majumdar believed that the party would support his doctrine. Land minister Hare Krishna Konar had been supporting his rhetoric and said, "the militant confiscation of land was integral to the party's programme."

The Naxalbari uprising occurred in 1967 when farmers in Naxalbari, West Bengal, revolted with the support of the CPI-M. The event began the first wave of the Naxalite–Maoist insurgency, and influenced later waves. According to historian Sumanta Banerjee, there "can be no doubt that Naxalbari was a watershed in the recent history of India.... Most of the progressive trends in social activism today can be traced indirectly to the issues raised by or associated with the Naxalite movement in 1967."

In November 1967, a group led by Sushital Ray Chowdhury organised the All India Coordination Committee of Communist Revolutionaries (AICCCR). Mao Zedong provided ideological inspiration for the movement. He advocated that Indian peasants and lower class tribals overthrow the government of the upper classes by force. Many urban elites were attracted to the ideology, which spread through Majumdar's writings. These writings essayed from the opinions of communist leaders and theorists such as Mao, Karl Marx, and Vladimir Lenin.

The uprising led to the formation of Communist Party of India (Marxist–Leninist) (CPI-ML) in April 1969, which was announced by Sanyal at a mass meeting in Calcutta. It inspired similar movements in states like Orissa, Madhya Pradesh, Andhra Pradesh and Kerala. In 1971, Satyanarayan Singh revolted against the leadership and split the CPI-ML into two, forming a separate provisional committee.

Naxalism gained popularity among student groups in Calcutta. Students left school to join the Naxalites and Majumdar declared that the revolutionary warfare was to take place not only in the rural areas as before, but now everywhere and spontaneously. He also declared an "annihilation line" and issued a dictum to assassinate individual "class enemies" such as landlords, businessmen, teachers, police officers, politicians and others.

With the support of the government of India, Operation Steeplechase was launched with the aid of the paramilitary forces of the Indian Armed Forces, which resulted in the killing and imprisoning of suspected Naxalites and their cadres, including senior leaders. In July 1972, Majumdar was arrested by the West Bengal Police and he later died in police custody. After his death, the CPI-ML split into further factions such as the Mahadev Mukherjee faction and the CPI-ML Liberation in 1972. By 1973, the main leaders of the Naxalites were either eliminated or arrested. As a result of both external repression and a failure to maintain internal unity, the movement degenerated into extreme sectarianism and the original party fractured into more than 40 separate small groups. Naxalite organisations and groups were declared as terrorist organisations under the Unlawful Activities (Prevention) Act of India (1967).

The late 1970s saw the spread of Naxalism to other states of India. By 1980, it was estimated that around 30 Naxalite groups were active, with a combined membership of 30,000 members. In South India, the Communist Party of India (Marxist–Leninist) People's War was founded by Kondapalli Seetharamaiah in 1980. The People's Liberation Guerrilla Army, the armed wing of the CPI-M, was founded in 2000.

== Causes ==
=== Access to land and resources ===
The movement began in the late 1960s as a conflict between tribal peasants and landowners. This was attributed to a failure of the Indian government to implement constitutional reforms to provide for tribal autonomy with respect to natural resources on their lands, implement the land ceiling laws to limit the land possessed by the landlords and distribute the excess land to landless farmers and labourers. According to Maoist sympathisers, the Indian constitution "ratified colonial policy and made the state custodian of tribal homelands" and turned tribal populations into squatters on their own land, denying them their traditional rights to forest produce. Tribal communities participated in Naxalism probably as a means of push back against structural violence by the state, including the usage of land for the purposes of mineral extraction.

=== Rural development and protection ===
Impoverished areas with no electricity, running water, or poor healthcare provided by the state probably accepted social services from Naxalite groups, and gave their support to the Naxal cause in return. The state's absence allowed the Naxalites to become the legitimate authority in these areas by performing state-like functions, including enacting policies of redistribution and building infrastructure for irrigation. Testimonies from people and surveys by government officials and journalists have highlighted the protective and developmental work in the villages as a result of Naxalism. Healthcare initiatives such as malaria vaccination drives and medical units in areas without doctors or hospitals have also been documented.

As per an Indian government report, it was indicated that the Maoists "prevent the common villager's powerlessness over the neglect or violation of protective laws...[from] a trader who might be paying an exploitative rate for forest produce, or a contractor who is violating the minimum wage." It also mentions that the developmental work done by the Maoists including "mobilizing community labour for farm ponds, rainwater harvesting, and land conservation works in the Dandakaranya region, which villagers testified had improved their crops and improved their food security situation." A 2010 case study in the Economic and Political Weekly taken from 200 Maoist-affected districts in Odisha, Chhattisgarh, and Jharkhand, intended to investigate the government's initiative to increase employment in these Maoist-affected areas. It found that the claims of the government that the Maoists blocked developmental schemes were not valid and the Maoists were responsible for the enforcement of minimum wages in the areas. Although Naxalite groups engaged in coercion to increase membership, the experience of poverty when contrasted with the state's economic growth, could have created an appeal for the Naxal ideology and incentivised the tribal communities to join the Naxal movements out of "moral solidarity".

== Organisation ==
The Naxalites focused on the idea of a revolutionary personality while recruiting people to the organisation, which was termed as necessary for maintaining and establishing loyalty among the Naxalites by Charu Majumdar. During the early years of the movement, he believed that the essential characteristics of a recruit must be selflessness and the ability to self-sacrifice, and in order to produce such a specific personality, the organisation recruited students and youth. In addition to entrenching loyalty and a revolutionary personality within these new insurgents, the Naxalites chose the youth also because of other reasons. These were mostly students and it was necessary to include educated youth as these recruits would then be involved in spreading the communist teachings of Mao Zedong. In order to expand their base, the movement relied on these students to spread the communist philosophy to the uneducated rural and working-class communities. Majumdar also believed that it necessary to recruit youth who would be able to integrate themselves with the peasantry and working classes, and by living and working in similar conditions to these lower-class communities, these recruits could carry the communist teachings to the villages and urban centres.

The Krantikari Adivasi Mahila Sangathan is a feminist organisation that was formed in 1986 as a result of the party's acknowledgment of extreme inequality against women, both within the party itself and among the tribal villages the party aimed to protect. They campaigned against the tribal tradition of forced marriage, bigamy and violence along with peasant rights. However, Shobha Mandi, a former member who later quit the organisation, wrote in her book Ek Maowadi Ki Diary that she was repeatedly raped and assaulted by her fellow commanders for more than seven years since she wanted to quit. She also claimed that wife-swapping and adultery are common amongst the Maoists. The Naxalites claim that physical violence and sexual mutilation have been directed at their members by the police and the Salwa Judum, which had forced them to join the group.

=== Financing ===
Naxalites conduct detailed socio-economic surveys before operating in a target area and depend on diverse resources. Studies have indicated correlation between the core area of insurgency and the areas with extensive natural resources. The mining industry is a major financial source, wherein they collect about 3% of the profits from each mining company that operates in the areas under Naxal control as a means to continue mining operations and for "protection" services which allows miners to work without having to worry about Naxalite attacks. A 2006 report indicated that the Maoists extorted about ₹14 billion (US$150 million) annually. The organisation also funds itself through the drug trade, where it cultivates psychoactive plants such as marijuana and opium, which are then distributed throughout the country by middlemen who work on behalf of the Naxalites. About 40% of Naxal funding comes through the cultivation and distribution of opium. A surrendered Naxal claimed that they spent some of the money on public infrastructure while the rest is used for the sustenance of the group. In 2011, the Indian police accused the Chinese government of providing sanctuary to the movement's leaders, and claimed that the Pakistani ISI was providing financial support.

== In popular culture ==
=== Film ===
- Kaattu Vithachavar is a 2018 Indian Malayalam-language film about the Emergency period mentioning the Naxal movement and uprisings, police brutality, Uruttal, Kakkayam torture camp and the famous Rajan case, who was falsely arrested as a Naxal terrorist.
- The 2017 Indian Hindi-language film Newton prominently features the Naxal insurgency, as it follows a government bureaucrat assigned to conduct elections in a Naxal-controlled area of Chhattisgarh.
