= All India Coordination Committee of Communist Revolutionaries =

- Abbreviation: AICCCR
- Merged into: Communist Party of India (Marxist–Leninist)
- Formation: 12 November 1967
- Dissolved: 22 April 1969; 57 years ago
- Region served: Bihar, Karnataka, Kerala, Odisha, Punjab, Tamil Nadu, Uttar Pradesh, West Bengal
- Methods: Armed Struggle
- Key people: Charu Majumdar; Saroj Dutta; Sushital Roy Chowdhury; Kanu Sanyal
- Affiliations: Communist Party of India (Marxist)
- Formerly called: All India Coordination Committee of Revolutionaries (AICCR)
- Renamed from AICCR to AICCCR on 14 May 1968

All India Coordination Committee of Communist Revolutionaries was formed in 1967 as a splinter group of Communist Party of India (Marxist) (CPI(M)), seeing its participation in the United Front government in West Bengal as a betrayal. Initially the group was known as AICCR of the CPI(M), and partially functioned as an inner-party fraction.

AICCCR claimed that the Indian political situation was ripe for armed revolution and denounced participation in the Electoral Politics. The leaders of AICCCR were Charu Majumdar and Kanu Sanyal.

The first meeting if AICCCR in November 1967 was attended by the following persons:

- Shiv Kumar Mishra (Uttar Pradesh)
- S. N. Tiwari (Uttar Pradesh)
- Satyanarayan Singh (Bihar)
- Lakshman Singh (Bihar)
- Appu (Madras)
- Sambhunathan (Madras)
- Babu (Mysore)
- Kunnikkal Narayan (Kerala)
- Philip Prasad (Kerala)
- Rabi Das (Orissa)
- Radha Mohan Das (Orissa)
- Charu Majumdar (West Bengal)
- Sushital Roy Chowdhury (West Bengal)
- Saroj Dutta (West Bengal)
- Asit Sen (West Bengal)
- Pramod Ranjan Sengupta (West Bengal)
- Parimal Das Gupta (West Bengal)

After the Burdwan plenum of CPI(M) in April 1968 the group changed its name to just AICCCR.

At the second meeting of AICCCR in May 1968 there Punjab was also represented.

In August 1968 Parimal Das Gupta broke away from AICCCR.

In September 1968 Andhra Pradesh Coordination Committee of Communist Revolutionaries joined AICCCR.

In February 1969 the Andhra Pradesh Coordination Committee of Communist Revolutionaries was expelled from AICCCR. Rapidly after the expulsion of APCCCR, AICCCR organized an Andhra State Coordination Committee with Tejeshwara Rao as the convenor. AICCCR mainly drew its support from the Srikakulam district.

On 22 April 1969 AICCCR formed the Communist Party of India (Marxist-Leninist).
