= Revolutionary Communist Unity Centre (Marxist–Leninist) =

Revolutionary Communist Unity Centre (Marxist–Leninist) was a communist group in India. RCUC(M-L) was formed by Asit Sen in 1970, who had left the All India Coordination Committee of Communist Revolutionaries in early 1969. Sen criticized Communist Party of India (Marxist-Leninist) (CPI(ML)) for not organizing mass movements.

== See also ==
- List of Naxalite and Maoist groups in India
