= Charu Majumdar =

Indian Naxalite politician (1918–1972)

General Secretary of CPI(ML)
- In office 1969–1972
- Preceded by: Office established
- Succeeded by: Office dissolved

Darjeeling district secretary of CPI(M)
- In office 1964–1967
- Preceded by: Office established
- Succeeded by: Office dissolved

State committee member of CPI for West Bengal
- In office 1943–1964
- Preceded by: Office established
- Succeeded by: Office dissolved

Personal details
- Born: 15 May 1918 Siliguri, Bengal Presidency, British India
- Died: 28 July 1972 (aged 53) Calcutta, West Bengal, India
- Party: Communist Party of India (Marxist-Leninist)
- Spouse: Lila Majumdar Sengupta
- Children: Abhijit Majumdar
- Education: University of Calcutta; Siliguri College; Govt. Edward College, Pabna
- Criminal information
- Status: Death in jail
- Criminal charge: Criminal conspiracy
- Penalty: Jailed

Charu Majumdar (Note: Bengali: চারু মজুমদার, romanized: Cāru Môjumdār [ˈtʃaːɾu ˈmɔdʒumd̪aɾ]) (15 May 1918 – 28 July 1972) was an Indian communist ideologue, and founder and General Secretary of the Communist Party of India (Marxist–Leninist). Born into a landlord family in Siliguri in 1918, he became a Communist during the Indian independence movement, and later formed Naxalism, an armed rebellion. During this period, he authored the historic accounts of the 1967 Naxalbari uprising. His writings, particularly the Historic Eight Documents, have become part of the ideological doctrine of a number of Communism-aligned political parties in India.

== Biography ==
Majumdar was born in a Baidya family at Matualaloi, Rajshahi (now Siliguri) to a zamindar family. His father Bireshwar Majumdar was a freedom fighter and president of the Darjeeling District Committee of the Indian National Congress during the Indian independence movement.

In 1930, as a student in Siliguri, he joined the All Bengal Students' Association, which was affiliated to the underground anti-colonial organisation Anushilan Samiti, at the instance of Sewmangal Singh and Brojen Basu Roy Choudhuri.

Having graduated from his matriculation exams in 1937 with a First Division, Majumdar took admission to Edward College in Pabna district (present day Bangladesh). However he returned to Siliguri after sometime, having quit his formal education, in order to join the independence movement. In 1938, at the age of 19, he joined the Congress Socialist Party.

The next year when the Communist Party of India (CPI) was organised in the neighbouring Jalpaiguri district, Majumdar joined the then-banned party to work in its peasant chapter. Soon an arrest warrant forced him to go into hiding for the first time as a communist activist. Although the CPI was banned at the outbreak of World War II, he continued CPI activities among peasants and was made a member of the CPI Jalpaiguri district committee in 1942. The promotion emboldened him to organize a 'seizure of crops' campaign in Jalpaiguri during the Great Famine of 1943. In 1946, he joined the Tebhaga movement in the Jalpaiguri region and embarked on a proletariat militant struggle in North Bengal. The stir shaped his vision of a revolutionary struggle. Later he worked among tea garden workers in Darjeeling.

The CPI was banned in 1948 and he spent the next three years in jail. In January 1952 he married Lila Majumdar Sengupta, a fellow CPI member from Jalpaiguri. The couple moved to Siliguri, which was the center of Majumdar's activities for a few years. He was briefly imprisoned in 1962.

During the mid-1960s Majumdar organized a leftist faction in Communist Party of India (Marxist) (CPI(M)) in northern Bengal. In 1967, a militant peasant uprising took place in Naxalbari, led by his comrade-in-arms Kanu Sanyal. This group would later be known as the Naxalites, and eight articles written by him at this time—known as the Historic Eight Documents—have been seen as providing their ideological foundation. Majumdar contended that revolution must take the path of armed struggle on the pattern of the Chinese Communist Revolution and that the uprising in Naxalbari was the beginning of a Maoist revolution. Majumdar placed major emphasis on Quotations from Chairman Mao Zedong, requiring it to be studied and to be read aloud to illiterate peasants. Majumdar viewed Quotations as an important mechanism for building unity among revolutionary intellectuals, youths, workers, and peasants. Other texts emphasized by Majumdar included Lin Biao's Long Live the Victory of the People's War, and the Three Constantly Read Articles (a compilation of In Memory of Norman Bethune, Serve the People, and The Foolish Old Man Removes the Mountains).

When the Naxalbari uprising was crushed in 1967, Majumdar said: "...hundreds of Naxalbaris are smoldering in India....Naxalbari has not died and will not die". The same year, Majumdar broke away and formed the All India Coordination Committee of Communist Revolutionaries. In 1969, Majumdar and others founded the Communist Party of India (Marxist–Leninist).

== Death ==
Majumdar was arrested on 16 July 1972. The circumstances of Majumdar's death are unclear. The official police response was that Majumdar died of a massive heart attack at 4 AM on 28 July 1972. All the Naxalite factions disputed this however, and instead said that it was a custodial murder and that he was killed by not being provided medicine in the police lock up. His body was cremated at the Keoratola crematorium under the watch of armed police and paramilitary forces.

The radical leftist movement in India has seen many ideological splits since Majumdar's death. Communist Party of India (Marxist–Leninist) Liberation observes Martyrs' Day on the anniversary of Majumdar's death. The Communist Party of India (Maoist) observes Martyrs' Week in the last week of July in remembrance of Majumdar's death, where members revisit his ideology and memorialise his influence on their movement.

== Books on Charu Majumdar's life ==
- Charu Majumdar: The Dreamer Rebel, written by Ashoke Mukhopadhyay, published by Niyogi Books in June 2022. ISBN 978-93-91125-03-5
- India after Naxalbari: unfinished history, written by Bernard D'Mello, published by Monthly Review Press New York in 2018. ISBN 978-158367-706-3, 978-158367-707-0

== See also ==
- Ajay Kanu
- Jagdish Mahto
