= 2023 Singareni Collieries Company Limited union representative election =

Telangana coal-mining corporation election

Elections for union representation at the Singareni Collieries Company Limited (SCCL) were held on December 27, 2023. The SCCL union representative elections carry strong political prestige in the state of Telangana, and trade unions of various political colours contested the vote. The main competitors were the unions affiliated to the All India Trade Union Congress (AITUC, linked to the Communist Party of India) and the Indian National Trade Union Congress (INTUC, linked to the Indian National Congress). Voting was postponed repeatedly. AITUC emerged as the winner of the election. The incumbent recognized union, the Bharat Rashtra Samithi-linked Telangana Boggu Ghani Karmika Sangham (TBGKS), was completely routed in the election.

== Background ==
SCCL is a coal mining company, operating 45 mines. 51% of the stakes in the company are held by the Telangana state government, whilst the remaining 49% are held by the union Ministry of Coal. In the SCCL union elections, the union with the largest number of votes becomes the recognized union at company level, whilst the most voted union at each division would become the recognized union at that division. Until 2023, six such elections had been held, with AITUC winning thrice, TBGKS twice and INTUC once. All major political parties have their respective trade unions at SCCL.

The Singareni union elections have a key political importance, as the divisions of the company stretches over 11 Telangana Legislative Assembly and 5 Lok Sabha constituencies where the coal miners and their families represent a major chunk of the electorate. The BRS-linked TBGKS had been the recognized union at SCCL since 2012. The last election had been held in 2017, with TBGKS winning the company level representation and the nine out of eleven divisions. The TBGKS victory in the 2017 SCCL union representative election contributed to the BRS victory in the 2018 Telangana Legislative Assembly election.

== Postponed elections ==
Per the usual schedule, SCCL union representative election should be been held in 2022. But without clearance from the BRS state government, the SCCL union representative election were being delayed. Since the October 5, 2017 union representative election until 2023 the electorate at SCCL had shrunk by more than 12,500 people, with further significant decline in the workforce to continue due to upcoming retirements.

Eventually the SCCL union representative elections were scheduled for October 28, 2023, just one month before the Telangana Legislative Assembly election. The SCCL management and 11 unions (including TBGKS, INTUC, HMS and IFTU) had requested further delaying the election. AITUC and BMS on the other hand met with Deputy Chief Labour Commissioner (Central) and SCCL union representative election Returning Officer D. Srinivasulu and asked for the holding of elections. D. Srinivasulu went ahead with issuing notification for election per the court order. D. Srinivasulu received nominations for the SCCL union representative election in Hyderabad October 6–7, 2023.

The Singareni Colliery Workers Union (AITUC) nomination was filed by SCWU president Vasireddy Seetharamaiah and union leaders Balaraju, Vanga Venkat, Bose and Venu. The Singareni Coal Mines Karmika Sangh (BMS) was filed by SCMKS president Yadagiri Sattaiah, general secretary Pawan Kumar, working president Peram Ramesh, Akhil Bharatiya Khadan Mazdoor Sangh leaders Puli Raja Reddy and Arutla Madhav Reddy. The Singareni Coal Mines Labour Union (INTUC) nomination was filed by INTUC general secretary Janak Prasad and leaders Chandrasekhar, Narasimha Reddy and Thyagarajan. The Singareni Miners and Engineering Workers Union (HMS) nomination was filed by its union president, Riyaz Ahmed. All in all, 14 unions filed their nominations. Any union not filing their nomination by October 7, 2023, would be disqualified from the election. As such the unions that had argued for further postponement filed their nominations within the deadline. Nominations could be withdrawn until October 9, 2023.

Thirteen unions would appear on the ballot for the SCCL union representative election;

| Union | Affiliation | Political orientation | Election symbol |
|---|---|---|---|
| Godavari Loya Boggugani Karmika Sangham (GLBKS) | Indian Federation of Trade Unions (IFTU) | Communist Party of India (Marxist-Leninist) New Democracy | Hammer in a cogwheel |
| Shramikashakti Godavari Loya Boggugani Karmika Sangham (SGLBKS) | All India Federation of Trade Unions (AIFTU) | | Lion |
| Praja Telangana Singareni Karma Sangham (PTSKS) | | | Two leaves |
| Singareni Coal Mines Karmika Sangh (SCMKS) | Bharatiya Mazdoor Sangh (BMS) | Bharatiya Janata Party | Torch |
| Singareni Coal Mines Labor Union (SCMLU) | Indian National Trade Union Congress (INTUC) | Indian National Congress | Table clock |
| Singareni Collieries Employees Union (SCEU) | Centre of Indian Trade Unions (CITU) | Communist Party of India (Marxist) | Rising Sun |
| Singareni Collieries Labour Union (SCLU) | Telugu Nadu Trade Union Council (TNTUC) | Telugu Desam Party | Motorcycle |
| Singareni Collieries Workers Union (SCWU) | All India Trade Union Congress (AITUC) | Communist Party of India | Star |
| Singareni Ghani Karmika Sangham (SGKS) | | Unity Centre of Communist Revolutionaries of India (Marxist–Leninist) | Pick axe |
| Singareni Miners and Engineering Workers Union (SM&EWU) | Hind Mazdoor Sabha (HMS) | | Scales |
| Telangana Boggu Ghani Karmika Sangham (TBGKS) | | Bharat Rashtra Samithi | Arrow |
| Telangana Godavari Loya Boggugani Karmika Sangam (TGLBKS) | Indian Federation of Trade Unions (IFTU) | | Fist |
| Telangana Singareni Employees Union (TSEU) | | | Lamp helmet |

== Campaigning ==
Considering the proximity to the Telangana Legislative Assembly election the SCCL management filed a plea in the Telangana High Court, seeking a delay of the SCCL union representative election until after the Legislative Assembly election. The Telangana High Court then directed the SCCL management to hold the union representative election on December 27, 2023.

During the campaigning for the Legislative Assembly election in Bellampally, Telangana Pradesh Congress Committee president Revanth Reddy questioned why the BRS state government was seeking to delay the SCCL union representative elections. In the November 30, 2023 Telangana Legislative Assembly election the Indian National Congress won 9 seats in the SCCL area, the Communist Party of India 1 seat and the BRS just 1 seat (Asifabad). Following the outcome of the Legislative Assembly election, in which BRS lost the state government to the Indian National Congress, the SCCL management again approached the Telangana High Court and filed another request to delay the union representative elections. The SCCL management argued that the new state administration would need time to settle in before the holding of the union representative elections, seeking that the union representative election be held only after the 2024 Lok Sabha election. The BRS leadership feared that another backlash would further hurt the prospect of the party in the 2024 Lok Sabha election. On December 21, 2023, the Telangana High Court dismissed this request, asking that the election be held December 27, 2023 as scheduled.

In the light of the recent debacle in the Legislative Assembly election, the BRS supremo K. Chandrashekar Rao then instructed TBGKS to withdraw from the SCCL union representative election. On December 21, 2023, three TBGKS office bearers - the union president B. Venkat Rao, general secretary Miryala Rajireddy and working president K. Mallaiah - resigned in protest against this decision. The TBGKS office bearers stated that they would not lead a union that would drop out from the race prematurely, and K. Mallaiah argued that ballots had already been printed with the TBGKS election symbol. Following the desertions from the TBGKS leadership, the next day the TBGKS honorary president K. Kavitha announced that TBGKS was still in the race. Seeking to defend the TBGKS and BRS state government legacy, K. Kavitha claimed that thanks to K. Chandrashekhar Rao and BRS 32% of SCCL profits had been set aside for bonuses, 20,000 dependent jobs had been created in the SCCL and 10,000 interest-free home loans issued. TBGKS ran a very minimal campaign, with second-tier TBGKS leaders holding some meetings.

Whilst the mother parties of INTUC (the Indian National Congress) and AITUC (the Communist Party of India) were allies in the INDIA alliance at the national level, their unions at SCCL contested the election separately. INTUC built its campaign messaging around "6Gs" - six guarantees, being promises to set up more underground mines to generate more jobs in SSCL, preventing and opposing privatization of SCCL, allocation of 250-yard plots for workers to build homes, interest-free bank loans of up to 2 million Indian rupees, exemption for mine workers from paying income tax on allowances, the building of a superspeciality hospital and modernization of area hospitals and open cast mining jobs for women. Congress state government ministers and Members of Legislative Assembly campaigned for INTUC. State government ministers D. Sridhar Babu and Ponguleti Srinivasa Reddy spoke at INTUC campaign meetings. Mancherial Member of Legislative Assembly Kokkirala Premsagar Rao campaigned for INTUC in Srirampur division. On December 22, 2023, some 3,000 people attended an INTUC campaign rally, at which Kokkirala Premsagar Rao and INTUC general secretary Janak Prasad spoke.

AITUC ran a 'whirlwind election campaign' led by CPI state secretary and Kothagudem Member of Legislative Assembly Kunamneni Sambasiva Rao and other local AITUC leaders. Leaders of CITU, BMS, and HMS also campaigned for their respective affiliated unions.

Three revolutionary trade unions - GLBKS, TGLBKS and SGLBKS - decided to contest in alliance, calling on workers to vote for the hammer in cogwheel symbol of GLBKS. On December 13, 2023, they held a joint rally at GDK-1 division, addressed by GLBKS president S. Venkateswara Rao, TGLBKS general secretary I. Krishna and SGLBKS president Ramanna, at which they recalled the historical legacy of revolutionary trade unions of Singareni, that SCCL had been kept alive thanks to the struggles of the grandfathers and fathers of the workers and that electing bourgeois union representatives at this juncture would threaten the survival of SCCL. On December 15, 2023, GLBKS-TGLBKS-SGLBKS held a joint press conference, at which Indian Federation of Trade Unions (IFTU) national general secretary T. Srinivas called on workers to resist threats of privatization and contractualization.

== Voting ==
Campaigning ended on December 25, 2023. There were 84 polling stations across the 11 divisions. The Central Labour Department observed the election. Security arrangements were strict during the voting, with Section 144 being implemented. Barring minor incidents, voting was largely peaceful. At the Srirampur 3 Coal Mine at Mancherial AITUC protested, accusing that election staff was favouring INTUC. Voting turnout was high, with the highest percentage of participation recorded in Yellandu division (98.37%).

== Results ==
=== Company-wide results ===
| Union | Votes | % | Divisions won |
|---|---|---|---|
| Singareni Collieries Workers Union (AITUC) | 16,177 | 43.20% | 5 |
| Singareni Coal Mine Labour Union (INTUC) | 14,178 | 37.86% | 6 |
| Telangana Boggu Ghani Karmika Sangham | 1,298 | 3.47% | 0 |
| Others | 7,086 | 18.92% | 0 |

=== Voting per division ===
| Division | Eligible voters | Votes cast | Participation | Winner |
|---|---|---|---|---|
| Ramagunda-I | 5,384 | 5,044 | 93.68% | AITUC |
| Ramagunda-II | 3,556 | 3,369 | 94.74% | AITUC |
| Ramagunda-III | 3,884 | 3,612 | 93.00% | INTUC |
| Bhupalpally | 5,442 | 5,123 | 94.14% | INTUC |
| Bellampally | 996 | 959 | 96.29% | AITUC |
| Mandamarri | 4,835 | 4,515 | 93.38% | AITUC |
| Srirampur | 9,127 | 8,491 | 93.03% | AITUC |
| Kothagudem | 2,326 | 2,207 | 94.88% | INTUC |
| Yellandu | 614 | 604 | 98.37% | INTUC |
| Manuguru | 2,450 | 2,378 | 97.06% | INTUC |
| Corporate headquarters | 1,191 | 1,149 | 96.47% | INTUC |

AITUC won the election to become the recognized union at company level. Reacting to the results, INTUC accused CPI of colluding with the BRS to win the election.

At the Kothagudem corporate headquarters INTUC got 549 votes, BMS in second place with 261 votes, AITUC 253 votes, CITU 42 votes, TBGKS 32 votes and HMS 4 votes. At the Bellampalli division AITUC got 497 votes, INTUC 375 votes, HMS 61 votes, CITU 11 votes, BMS 6 votes, TBGKS 3 votes and there were 3 invalid votes. At Yellandu INTUC won with 311 votes, 264 votes, BMS 9 votes, IFTU 7 votes, CITU 7 votes, HMS 3 votes, TBGKS 1 vote and 1 invalid vote. Congress Member of Legislative Assembly Koram Kanakaiah joined celebrations of the INTUC victory at Yellandu on December 27, 2023.

The Telangana Godavari Loya Boggugani Karmika Sangam (which had called for a vote for GLBKS) obtained 6 votes company-wide, whilst the election symbols of the Praja Telangana Singareni Karmika Sangam and the Shramikashakti Godavari Loya Boggugani Karmika Sangam obtained 2 votes each.
