= Trade unions in India =

National occurrence of trade unions

- Regulatory authority: Ministry of Labour and Employment

Global Rights Index
- 5 No guarantee of rights
- Freedom of Association: Not ratified
- Right to Organise: Not ratified

Trade unions in India are registered and file annual returns under the Trade Union Act (1926). Statistics on trade unions are collected annually by the Labour Bureau of the Ministry of Labour, Government of India. According to the data released for 2012, there were 16,154 trade unions with a combined membership of 9.18 million, based on returns from 15 states out of a total of 28 states and 9 union territories. The trade union movement in India is largely divided along political lines and follows a pre-Independence pattern of overlapping interactions between political parties and unions. The net result of this system is debated, as it has both advantages and disadvantages. According to data submitted by various trade unions to the Ministry of Labour and Employment as part of a survey, INTUC, with a combined membership of 33.3 million, emerged as the largest trade union in India as of 2013.

Firm or industry-level trade unions are often affiliated with larger federations. The largest federations in the country, which represent labour at the national level, are known as central trade union organisations (CTUOs). As of 2002, when the last trade union verification was carried out, there were 12 CTUOs recognised by the Ministry of Labour.

== History ==
The establishment of textile and clothing mills around the port cities of Bombay (now Mumbai), Calcutta (now Kolkata), Madras (now Chennai), and Surat in the latter half of the 19th century marked the beginnings of the industrial workforce in India. Several incidents of strikes and protests by workers were recorded during this period. The credit for the first association of Indian workers is generally attributed to the Bombay Mill-Hands Association, founded by N.M. Lokhande in 1890. This was shortly after the passing of the 'First' Factories Act in 1881 by the British government. The subsequent years saw the formation of several labour associations and unions. The first registered trade union is considered to be the Madras Labour Union, founded by B.P. Wadia in 1918, while the first trade union federation established was the All India Trade Union Congress in 1920.

Following the rapid growth of unions around the time of the First World War, the Russian Revolution, and the establishment of the ILO, industrial conflict began to rise, with over 1,000 strikes recorded between 1920 and 1924. The situation intensified with the arrest of prominent leaders and trade unionists in the infamous 'Cawnpore Conspiracy Case' of 1924, where union leaders were accused of attempting a Communist revolution to overthrow the ruling British government. Subsequently, the Trade Union Act (1926) was enacted, creating rules for the regulation and closer monitoring of trade unions. In the first year of the law's implementation, 28 unions registered and submitted returns, with a total membership of 100,619. The number of unions grew rapidly thereafter, and by the time of India's independence in 1947, there were 2,766 registered unions with a combined membership of over 1.66 million. This broad influence of unions and workers' organisations led to the enactment of significantly favourable social legislation in the first decade of Independence, including several important labour laws.

=== Independence (1947) to liberalisation (1991) ===
Following the country's independence in 1947 and the formation of the republic in 1950, India largely adopted a socialist economic approach, promoting public sector employment and pro-worker legislation. The trade union movement reflected the major political divisions of the time, being primarily divided along socialist and communist lines. The subsequent decades saw significant growth in trade union membership, with the number of active unions peaking in the mid-1970s and mid-1980s. While the 1970s were marked by political instability, the 1980s saw a shift towards more market-friendly policies, increased support for industrialists, and implicit opposition to workers. Two key events during this period were the 1974 railway strike and the Great Bombay textile strike of 1982, the latter of which led to a prolonged and complex stalemate.

=== Liberalisation (1991) to present ===
The period following economic liberalisation in 1991 was characterised by reduced government intervention in the economy, a decline in public sector employment, and increased encouragement for the private sector. Efforts to unionise in the private sector were often met with opposition, and the general withdrawal of state support for workers further undermined their bargaining power. These policies resulted in stagnation in the number of unionised formal sector workers.

A gradual shift in focus towards the importance of the informal sector and 'informal employment in the formal sector' from the late 1990s onwards led trade unions to also focus on these workers. This shift resulted in greater enrolment of informal sector workers and an increase in union membership. The central trade union organisations (CTUOs) raised their combined membership from 13.21 million in 1989 to 24.85 million in 2002. Nearly all CTUOs now have at least 20 percent of their official members from the informal sector.

== Image gallery ==
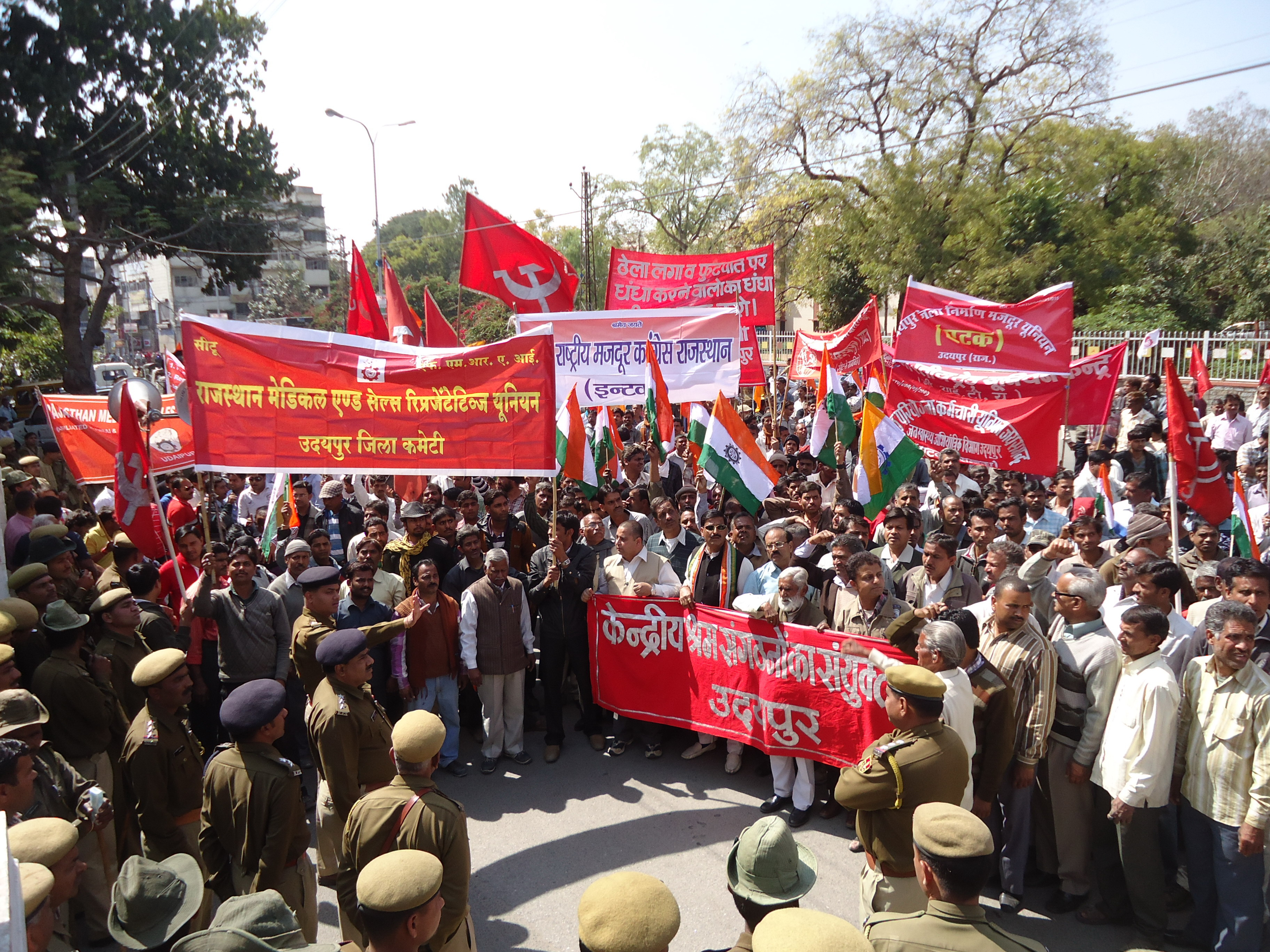
All Trade Unions' rally in Udaipur, Rajasthan

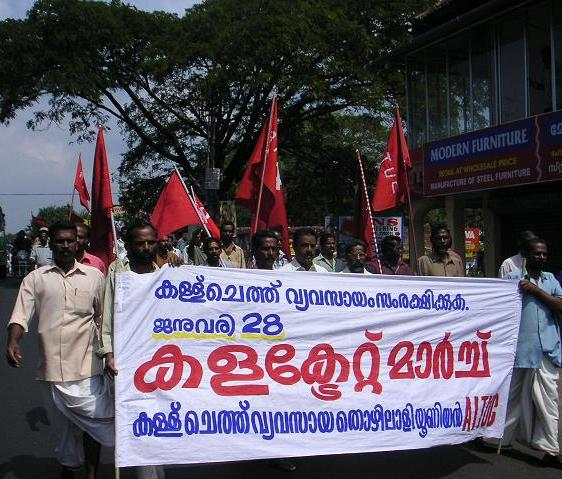
AITUC rally in Alappuzha, Kerala

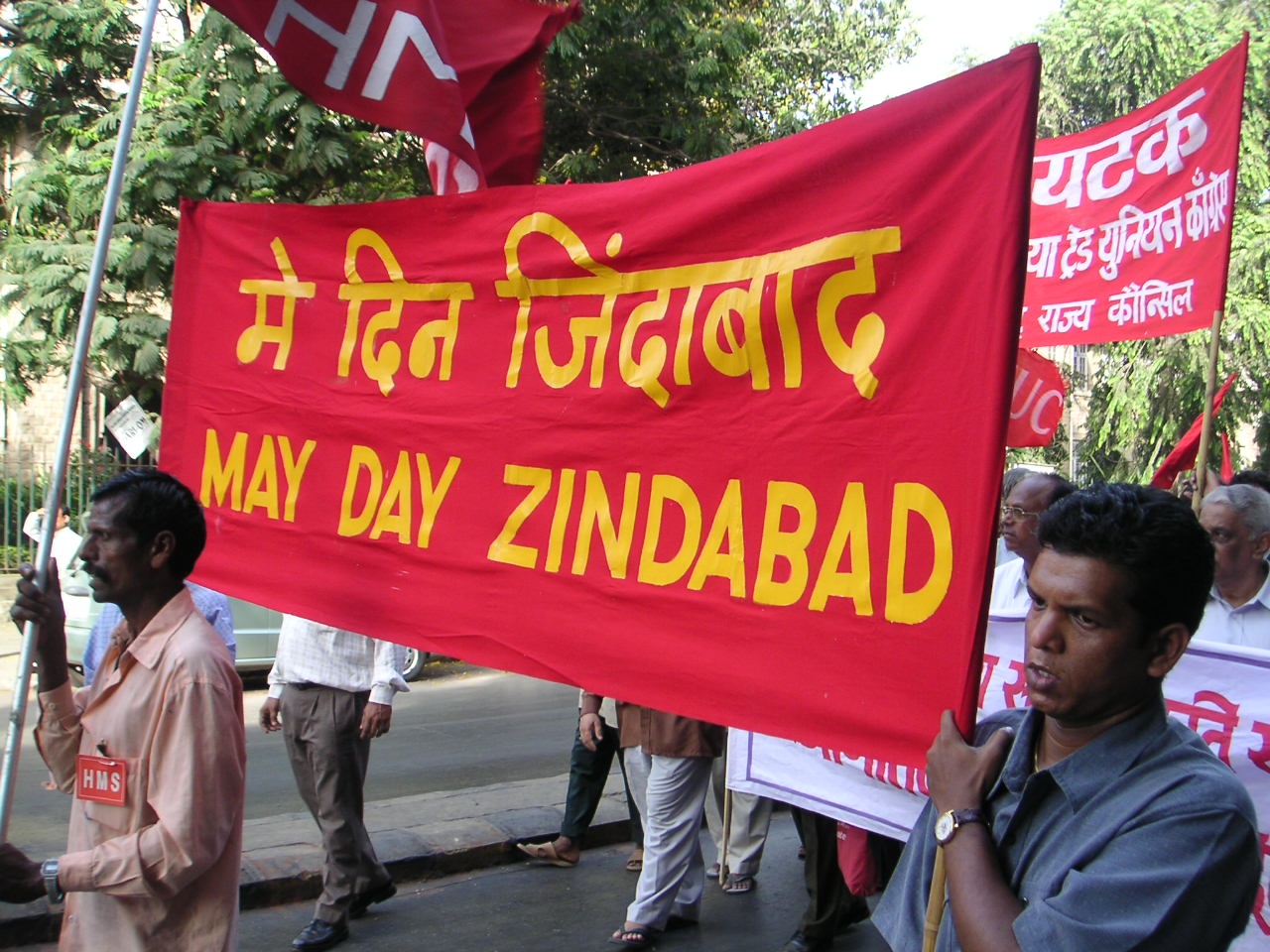
May Day rally in Mumbai

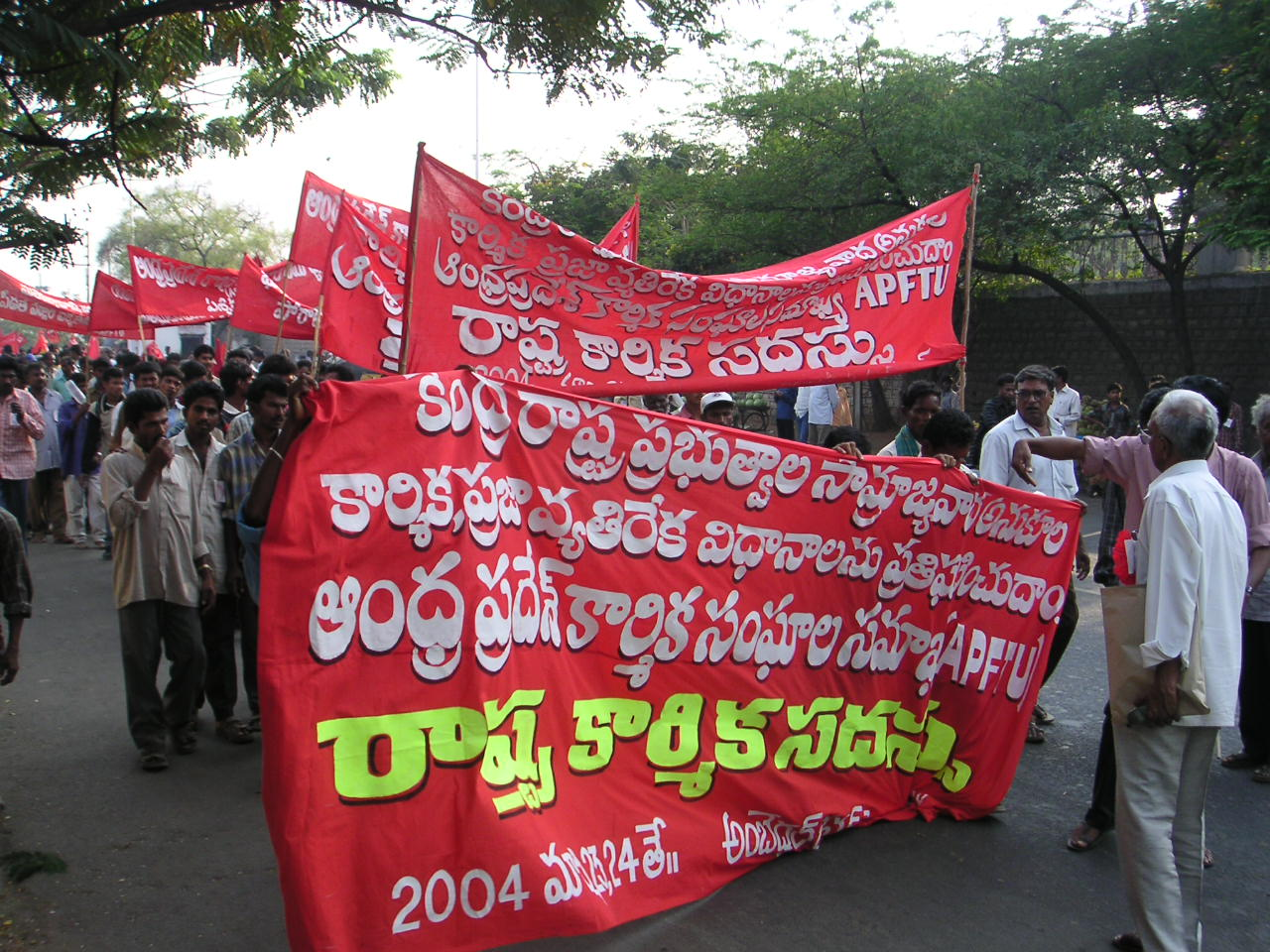
APFTU rally in Hyderabad

== Central trade union organisations (CTUOs) of India ==
Local, firm-level, or industry-level trade unions are often affiliated with larger federations. The largest federations in the country represent labour at the national level and are known as central trade union organisations (CTUs or CTUOs). To acquire the CTUO status, a trade union federation must have a verified membership of at least 500,000 workers spread across a minimum of four states and four industries (including agriculture). Trade union membership verification is usually conducted once a decade, and an updated verification with new criteria is currently underway, with 2011 as the reference year. Complications around membership verification have arisen due to discrepancies between the membership claimed by unions and the actual number of members. These issues have increased in recent years with the wider inclusion of informal sector workers in union membership data.

The International Labour Organization has listed 12 organisations that are officially recognised as CTUOs under the terms set by the Ministry of Labour.

List of CTUOs as of 2002
	Acronym	Labour Union	Political Relationship	International Affiliation
1	AICCTU	All India Central Council of Trade Unions	Communist Party of India (Marxist–Leninist) Liberation	World Federation of Trade Unions
2	AITUC	All India Trade Union Congress	Communist Party of India	World Federation of Trade Unions
3	AIUTUC	All India United Trade Union Centre	Socialist Unity Centre of India (Communist)	
4	BMS	Bharatiya Mazdoor Sangh	Rashtriya Swayamsevak Sangh	
5	CITU	Centre of Indian Trade Unions	Communist Party of India (Marxist)	World Federation of Trade Unions
6	HMS	Hind Mazdoor Sabha		International Trade Union Confederation
7	INTUC	Indian National Trade Union Congress	Indian National Congress	International Trade Union Confederation
8	LPF	Labour Progressive Federation	Dravida Munnetra Kazhagam	
9	SEWA	Self Employed Women's Association		International Trade Union Confederation
10	UTUC	United Trade Union Congress	Revolutionary Socialist Party	World Federation of Trade Unions
11	TUCC	Trade Union Coordination Centre	All India Forward Bloc	World Federation of Trade Unions

== Other trade unions and centres ==
(Incomplete list, In Alphabetical order)

- Akhil Bharatiya Kamgar Sena (Akhil Bharatiya Sena)
- All India Bank Employees Association - AIBEA (affiliated with All India Trade Union Congress)
- All India Insurance Workers Union (Affiliated to PWPI i.e. Progressive Workers and Peasants of India)
- All India IT and ITeS Employees' Union - AIITEU (Affiliated to Centre of Indian Trade Unions)
- All India Bank Officers' Association - AIBOA (Non political Independent Organisation)
- All India Union Bank Officer Staff Association - AIUBOSA (Affiliated to AIBOA)
- All India Bank Officers' Confederation (Non political Independent Organisation)
- All India Punjab National Bank Officers' Association (Affiliated to AIBOC)
- All India Central Council of Trade Unions (Communist Party of India (Marxist–Leninist) Liberation)
- All India Centre of Trade Unions (Marxist Communist Party of India (United))
- All India Federation of Trade Unions (Marxist–Leninists)
- All India Railwaymen's Federation (AIRF) () (affiliated with Hind Mazdoor Sabha)
- All India Workers Trade Union (Affiliated to PWPI i.e. Progressive Workers and Peasants of India)
- Central Organization of Indian Trade Unions(COITU) (Communist Workers Party(CWP))
- Andhra Pradesh Federation of Trade Unions (Communist Party of India (Marxist–Leninist))
- Anna Thozhil Sanga Peravai (All India Anna Dravida Munnetra Kazhagam)
- Archaeological Survey of India Workers Union, New Delhi
- Bharatiya Kamgar Sena (Shiv Sena)
- Bharatiya Khadya Nigam Karamchari Sangh- BKNK SANGH (Nationally recognised Employees union of Food Corporation of India with Pan India presence)
- Bharatiya Khet Mazdoor Union-BKMU (Communist party of India)
- Bharatiya Mazdoor Sabha (Provisional Central Committee, Communist Party of India (Marxist–Leninist))
- Bihar-Jharkhand Sales Representatives' Union BSSR Union (BSSR Union) () Affiliated to CITU & FMRAI
- Bihari Peasants Union (Affiliated to PWPI i.e. Progressive Workers and Peasants of India)
- Confederation of Free Trade Unions of India (CFTUI) (Non-political affiliated Unions of India)
- Central Organization of Indian Trade Unions(COITU) (Communist Workers Party(CWP)
- Dronagiri General Kamgar Union (Affiliated to PWPI i.e. Progressive Workers and Peasants of India)
- Federation of Medical & Sales Representatives'Association of India affiliated to CITU.
- Hind Mazdoor Kisan Panchayat (Janata Dal (United))
- Independent Labour Union (Unaffiliated)
- Indian Confederation of Labour
- Indian Federation of Trade Unions (Communist Party of India (Marxist–Leninist) New Democracy)
- Indian National Trinamool Trade Union Congress
- Indian Railways Technical Supervisors' Association (IRTSA) ()
- Indian Railway Loco Runningmen Organization (IRLRO) (Railway Loco Pilots Trade Union)
- IT and ITES Democratic Employees Association (IIDEA) (Affiliated to All India Central Council of Trade Unions)
- Jharkhand Mazdoor Sangha
- Kamgar Ekta
- Karnataka State IT/ITeS Employees Union - KITU (Affiliated to Centre of Indian Trade Unions)
- Kerala Trade Union Congress (Kerala Congress, KTUC (B) belongs to KC (B), KTUC (M) belongs to KC (M), etc.)
- Maharashtra General Kamgar Union (Kamgar Aghadi)
- Marumalarchi Labour Front (MDMK)
- Nascent IT Employees Senate - NITES (Regd.)
- Nirman Mazdoor Sangh Delhi (REGd.)
- Progressive Workers and Peasants of India (Janardan Singh is Founder and General Secretary)
- Pattali Trade Union (Pattali Makkal Katchi)
- Rajdhani Nirman Mazdoor Kalyan Sangh, New Delhi
- Raigad Shramik Aekta Sangh (Affiliated to PWPI i.e. Progressive Workers and Peasants of India)
- Rashtrawadi Mathadi and General Labour Union (National Congress Party NCP)
- Rashtriya Mulnivasi Bahujan Karmachari Sangh (BAMCEF) - RMBKS
- Shramik Vikas Sangathan(SVS) (Aam Aadmi Party)
- Socialist Trade Union Centre (SNDP)
- Swabhimani Mazdoor Sangathan
- Swatantra Thozhilali Union (Indian Union Muslim League)
- Telugu Nadu Trade Union Council (Telugu Desam Party)
- Trade Union Centre of India (Communist Party of India (Marxist–Leninist))
- United Trade Union Congress (Bolshevik) (Revolutionary Socialist Party (Bolshevik))
- United Trade Union Congress (Marxist) (Revolutionary Socialist Party (Marxist))
- West Bengal Medical and Sales' Representatives Union
- West Bengal state electricity board employees union (affiliated to INTTUC, Affiliation No 505)
- West Bengal State Electricity Workmen's Union (affiliated to CITU & EEFI)
- Webanker (Trade Union for Bank Employees)

== Notable trade union leaders in India ==
(In Alphabetical order)

- Ardhendu Bhushan Bardhan
- B. P. Wadia
- Bindeshwari Dubey
- Chaturanan Mishra
- Datta Samant
- Dattopant Thengadi
- Diwan Chaman Lall
- George Fernandes
- Gurudas Dasgupta
- Indrajit Gupta
- Kalyan Roy
- Narayan Malhar Joshi
- Narayan Meghaji Lokhande
- Ramdev Singh
- S.A. Dange
- S.S. Mirajkar
- S.V. Ghate
- Saumyendranath Tagore
- B.T. Ranadive

== Participants ==
According to the Periodic Labour Force Survey (PLFS) of 2019, it shows that the Indian economy has shrunk for the first time in four decades, from 467.7 million in 2011–12 to 461.5 million in 2017–18. Agriculture experienced the most massive layoffs, with 29.3 million workers losing their jobs. Women account for the vast majority of those who have lost their jobs (24.7 million).

== See also ==
- List of trade unions in Indian tea gardens
- List of trade unions in the Singareni coal fields
