= List of trade unions in the Singareni coal fields =

A list of trade unions active in the Singareni coal fields, in Telangana, India. Political affiliation of the union within brackets.

- All India Federation of Trade Unions
- Godavari Loya Boggagani Karmika Sangham, affiliated to Indian Federation of Trade Unions (Communist Party of India (Marxist-Leninist) New Democracy)
- Godavari Loya Boggu Karmika Union, affiliated to Indian Federation of Trade Unions (Communist Party of India (Marxist-Leninist) Pratighatana)
- Singareni Collieries Employees Union, affiliated to Centre of Indian Trade Unions (Communist Party of India (Marxist))
- SCMK Sangh, affiliated to Bharatiya Mazdoor Sangh (Bharatiya Janata Party)
- Singareni Coalmines Labour Union, affiliated to Indian National Trade Union Congress (Indian National Congress)
- Singareni Collieries Labour Union, affiliated to Telugu Nadu Trade Union Council (Telugu Desam Party)
- Singareni Collieries Mine Workers Union
- Singareni Collieries Workers Union, affiliated to All India Trade Union Congress (Communist Party of India)
- Singareni Ghani Karmika Sangham
- Singareni Karmika Samakya (Communist Party of India (Maoist))
- Singareni Workers Union (Unity Centre of Communist Revolutionaries of India (Marxist-Leninist) (D.V. Rao))
- SM&EW Union, affiliated to Hind Mazdoor Sabha
- Telangana Boggu Ghani Karimka Sangham (Bharat Rashtra Samithi)

Results from the 2004 Singareni Collieries Company Limited union polls:

- Singareni Coalmines Labour Union: 30 291 votes
- Singareni Collieries Workers Union: 21 599 votes
- Singareni Collieries Mine Workers Union: 9 807 votes
- Singareni Collieries Labour Union: 7609 votes
- Godavari Loya Boggagani Karmika Sangham: 3179 votes
- SCEU: 2937 votes
- SC&EW Union: 1583 votes
- Others:
- Total: 76 517 votes

The INTUC-affiliated SCMLU won representation with the corporation. The term is four years.

== See also ==
- Indian Trade Unions
