= Haripriya Banoth =

Indian politician

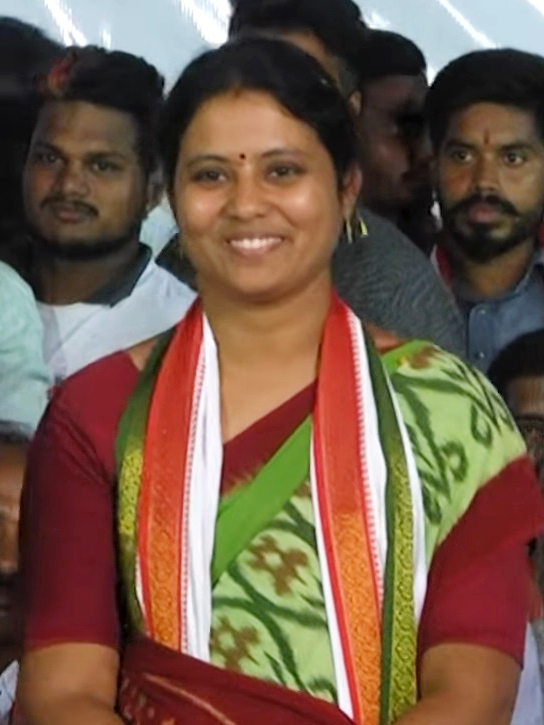
- Banoth campaigning at Yellandu in 2018

Member of Telangana Legislative Assembly
- In office 12 December 2018 – 03 December 2023
- Preceded by: Koram Kanakaiah
- Succeeded by: Koram Kanakaiah
- Constituency: Yellandu

Personal details
- Born: Haripriya Badavath; 1 May 1985 (age 41) Kothagudem, Andhra Pradesh, India
- Party: Telangana Rashtra Samithi (2019–present)
- Other political affiliations: Telugu Desam Party (2014–2017); Indian National Congress (2017–2019)
- Spouse: Hari Singh Banoth (m. 2002)
- Education: M. Tech. in computer science from JNTUH

Haripriya Banoth (née Badavath; born 1 May 1985) is an Indian politician from Telangana. She won the 2018 Telangana Legislative Assembly Election from constituency on a Congress ticket but later shifted to BRS. At the age of 33 when elected, Banoth was the youngest member of the Telangana Legislative Assembly. Now, the youngest member of the Telangana Legislative Assembly is Mynampally Rohit Rao.

== Early and personal life ==
Haripriya Badavath was born on 1 May 1985 in Kothagudem of present-day Telangana (then in Andhra Pradesh) to Seetharam and Darjan. Her father used to work in the Singareni Collieries Company. She was married to Hari Singh Banoth of Tekulapalli immediately after completing her intermediate education in 2002. However, with her husband's encouragement, she completed her graduation with B. Tech and later obtained post-graduation with M. Tech in computer science from the Jawaharlal Nehru Technological University, Hyderabad (JNTUH). In 2006, they started Hari Singh Education Institutions which has four private schools and four junior colleges in Tekulapalli and Hyderabad. She lives at Tekulapalli, Telangana.

In June 2021, Banoth announced that she would adopt two orphaned children from Yellandu who lost both their parents at a young age, on a response to the minister K. T. Rama Rao's tweet.

== Career ==
Hari priya was an active member of the Telugu Desam Party (TDP) which influenced Haripriya to join the politics. For the 2014 Andhra Pradesh Legislative Assembly election, the TDP chief N. Chandrababu Naidu nominated Haripriya Banoth to represent the Yellandu constituency from TDP as the party felt that an educated person would have a better chance at winning the seat. However, she was defeated by the Indian National Congress (INC) candidate Kanakaiah Koram by a margin of 11,507 votes.

In 2017, following the statehood of Telangana, Banoth joined Indian National Congress in the hope of contesting from the party. In the 2018 Telangana Legislative Assembly election, Banoth was elected as a Member of the Legislative Assembly (MLA) from Yellandu by narrowly defeating the incumbent Kanakaiah Koram of the Telangana Rashtra Samithi (TRS) with a margin of 2,887 votes. Elected at the age of 33, Banoth became the youngest MLA in the Telangana Legislative Assembly.

In February 2019, Banoth carried out a hunger strike for 36 hours demanding the establishment of steel plant in Bayyaram. In March 2019, she joined the Telangana Rashtra Samithi citing "the interest of her constituency's development" as the reason. But she lost the 2023 Assembly election to Koram Kanakaiah of Indian National Congress by a margin of 57,309 votes.

== Political statistics ==
Election results
| Year | Election | Constituency | Party | Opponent | Majority | Result | Ref. |
|---|---|---|---|---|---|---|---|
| 2014 | Andhra Pradesh Legislative Assembly election | Yellandu | TDP | Kanakaiah Koram (INC) | -11507 | Lost | |
| 2018 | Telangana Legislative Assembly election | Yellandu | INC | Kanakaiah Koram (TRS) | 2887 | Won | |
| 2023 | Telangana Legislative Assembly election | Yellandu | TRS | Kanakaiah Koram (INC) | -57309 | Lost | |
