= Tamil Nadu Democratic Construction Labour Union =

Trade union in India

T.N.D.C.L.U.
- Tamil Nadu Democratic Construction Labour Union
- Location: India
- Affiliations: All India Central Council of Trade Unions

The Tamil Nadu Democratic Construction Labour Union (TNDCLU) is a trade union of construction workers in the state of Tamil Nadu, India.

TNDCLU is affiliated with the All India Construction Workers Federation (AICWF) and the All India Central Council of Trade Unions (AICCTU).
