= List of trade unions in Indian tea gardens =

Trade union in India

This is a list of Indian trade unions in tea gardens, with their political affiliation in parentheses.

== Assam ==
- Assam Chah Mazdoor Sangha, affiliated to Indian National Trade Union Congress (Indian National Congress)
- Assam Sangrami Chah Shramik Sangh, affiliated to All India Central Council of Trade Unions (Communist Party of India (Marxist-Leninist) Liberation)
- Assam Tea Labour Union
- Cachar Chah Sramik Union, affiliated to Indian National Trade Union Congress (Indian National Congress)
- Namoni Asam Cha Mazdoor Sangh, affiliated to Centre of Indian Trade Unions (Communist Party of India (Marxist))

== West Bengal ==
- All West Bengal Tea Garden Labourers Union (Communist Party of India (Marxist-Leninist))
- Cha Bagan Mazdoor Union, affiliated to Centre of Indian Trade Unions (Communist Party of India (Marxist))
- Darjeeling District Chia Kaman Majdoor Union, affiliated to Centre of Indian Trade Unions (Communist Party of India (Marxist))
- Darjeeling District Chia Kaman Majdoor Union, affiliated to All India Trade Union Congress (Communist Party of India)
- Darjeeling Terai Dooars Cheeya Kaman Mazdoor Union (Communist Party of Revolutionary Marxists)
- Darjeeling Terai Dooars Plantation Labour Union affiliated to (Gorkha Jan Mukti Morcha)
- Dooars Cha Bagan Workers' Union, affialied to United Trade Union Congress (Revolutionary Socialist Party)
- Himalayan Plantation Workers' Union (Gorkha National Liberation Front)
- National Union of Plantation Workers, affiliated to Indian National Trade Union Congress (Indian National Congress)
- Terai Sangrami Cha Sramik Union affiliated to the All India Central Council of Trade Unions (Communist Party of India (Marxist-Leninist) Liberation)
- West Bengal Cha Mazdoor Sabha, affiliated to Hind Mazdoor Sabha
