= Bojja =

Bojja (Telugu: బొజ్జా) is a Telugu surname. Notable people with the surname include:

- Bojja Bixamaiah Indian politician and trade unionist
- Bojja Tharakam (1937–2016), Indian poet, writer, and activist
- Bojja Venkata Reddy (born 1932), Indian politician
