= Madiraju =

Madiraju (Telugu: మాదిరాజు) is a Telugu surname:

- Madiraju Ranga Rao (born 1935), Indian poet
- Raj Madiraju (born 1969), Indian film director, screenwriter, actor, and producer
