= Fwice =

FWICE may refer to:

- Federation of Western India Cine Employees, a trade union.
- fwice is a command to test firewall filter rules in an IBM firewall for AIX.
