= Karepalli =

Karepalli Singareni village
- City
- Location in Telangana, India Karepalli (India)
- Coordinates: 17.510128°N 80.272036°E
- Country: India
- State: Telangana
- District: Khammam

Population
  - Total: 579,456

Languages
  - Official: Telugu
- Time zone: UTC+5:30 (IST)
- Postal code: 507122
- Vehicle registration: TS

Karepalli is a city in the Khammam district in Telangana, India where the railway track from Singareni collieries meets the Manuguru-Dornakal railway line. Karepalli is the Mandal headquarters of Singareni Mandal. It comes under the Wyra Assembly Constituency. Another name for Karepalli is Singareni.

== Kaloji's childhood ==
- There are records says that Kaloji Narayana Rao spent his childhood in karepalli.

== Education ==
=== Primary & Secondary ===
Karepalli has two primary schools, one at the centre of the town with an enrollment of 50 students, and the other at Bheekya Thanda. There are also five primary schools in the Gate Kareplally region. It has a Mandal Parishad Upper primary school with an enrollment of 209 students. There is also a Zilla Parishad High School with an enrollment of 239 students.

There are two Intermediate Colleges in Karepalli for +2 studies:

- Govt Junior College (Est 1983)
- Vignan Junior College (est 2007)

Primary and High Schools:

- Vidwan High School Telugu Medium
- Top Range Digital School
- Vidwan Digi English Medium School
- Z.P. High School
- U.P. School-Montessori English Medium School
- Nirmala English Medium School
- Little Stars Primary EM School
- Telangana Model School & College

=== Higher ===
Junior Colleges

- Telangana Model Jr. College
- GOVT Jr. College

Degree Colleges

- Vignan Degree College
- Nirmal Hrudai Degree College
- Vikas Degree College

Polytechnic Colleges

- Sre Kavitha Polytechnic College

Engineering Colleges

- Sree Raja Rajeshwari Engineering College
- Sree Kavitha Engineering College

MBA& MCA

- Sree Kavitha MBA & MCA College
- S.r.r. MBA & MCA College

== Transport ==
=== Train ===
The Karepalli railway station is also one of the oldest railway stations in the Telangana region. The station was built by the British government. The train route which was originally laid for the coal from Singareni gets divided at Karepalli, as one route goes to Yellandu for coal stock while the other route transports the coal to the Kothagudem thermal power plant.

The train route is also used by passengers for travel to Hyderabad and Vijayawada via Dornakal.

=== Road ===
It is connected to Yellandu and Khammam by road. TSRTC operates regular buses to Karepalli. There are also a large number of private autos that commute passengers.
