= Terai Sangrami Cha Sramik Union =

The Terai Sangrami Cha Sramik Union (Terai Struggling Tea Workers Union) is a progressive and revolutionary trade union of tea plantation workers in northern West Bengal, India. The union is affiliated to the All India Central Council of Trade Unions (AICCTU). Politically, the union is aligned with the Communist Party of India (Marxist-Leninist) Liberation.

As of 2004, Basudeb Basu was the President of TSCSU.

In 2011 TSCSU joined the Pashchim Banga Cha Sramik Karmachari Union, the Darjeeling Terai Dooars Chia Kaman Union and the All West Bengal Tea Garden Labourers Union in launching a joint campaign, for implementation of a daily minimum wage of ₹ 245 for labourers at tea plantations (in order to comply with the norms of the 15th International Labour Conference and subsequent orders of the Supreme Court of India). Moreover, the four unions resolved to campaign for the implementation of the Plantation Labour Act, and in case of sick and closed plantations demand the implementation of the 2010 Supreme Court directive.
