= Singareni Collieries Employees Union =

Trade union in India

S.C.E.U.
- Singareni Collieries Employees' Union
- Founded: July 1978
- Location: India
- Members: 3513 (1984)
- Key people: Bojja Bixamaiah (President), K. George (Secretary General)
- Affiliations: Centre of Indian Trade Unions

The Singareni Collieries Employees Union is a trade union in the Singareni coal fields in Andhra Pradesh, India. SCEU is affiliated to the Centre of Indian Trade Unions.

== Formation ==
SCEU was formed out of a split in the All India Trade Union Congress-affiliated Singareni Collieries Workers Union in 1978. SCEU was founded at a meeting in Kothagudem in July 1978. It was registered on 2 January 1979.

== Membership ==
As of 1984, SCEU had 3,513 members. In the 1980s SCEU was characterized for being well organised and with a high-profile leadership, even though the union is one of the smaller unions in the area.

== Officers ==
As of 2005, Bojja Bixamaiah was the president of SCEU. K. George had previously served as SCEU general secretary.
