= Godavari Loya Boggugani Karmika Sangham =

G.L.B.K.S.
- Godavari Loya Boggugani Karmika Sangham
- Location: India
- Key people: Bojja Bixamaiah (State President)
- Affiliations: Joint Action Committee, Indian Federation of Trade Unions

The Godavari Loya Boggugani Karmika Sangham is a trade union in the Singareni coal fields in Andhra Pradesh, India. The union is affiliated to the Indian Federation of Trade Unions. Politically, it is aligned with the Communist Party of India (Marxist-Leninist) New Democracy.

GLBKS polled 12,694 votes in the 1998 SCCL union representative election, finishing in fourth place. In the 2001 election GLBKS came third with 14,882 votes, contesting on a joint list with the All India Federation of Trade Unions. GLBKS won the election in two out of 13 divisions, Ramagundem I and Ramagundem II. After the 2001 union election, GLBKS gained representative status at area level.

In 2003 several key GLBKS leaders defected to the Communist Party of India (Marxist), including its state president Bojja Bixamaiah, vice president Y. Yakaiah and secretary B Pandu.

GLBKS is part of the Joint Action Committee, a coalition of unions at the Singareni coal fields.
