= APFTU =

APFTU may refer to:

- All Pakistan Federation of Trade Unions
- Andhra Pradesh Federation of Trade Unions in India
- A Place for the Unwilling, a videogame
