= Souribandhu Kar =

Indian trade unionist, writer, columnist (1948-2020)

- Born: 1948; Jajpur, India
- Died: April 3, 2020 (aged 71–72); Bhubaneswar, India
- Occupations: Trade unionist; Writer; Columnist
- Children: 4
- Relatives: Bauribandhu Kar (brother); Soubhagya Kar (son)
- Awards: Sahitya Akademi Award

Souribandhu Kar (c. 1948 – 13 April 2020) was an Indian trade unionist, writer, columnist and the former Canara Bank employee. He served as a general secretary of the All India Trade Union Congress for Odisha Unit and was actively engaged in left-wing politics. He is also known for his advocacy of civil rights such as child labour and workers' rights.

A member of the Communist Party of India, he was also appointed a vice-president of All India Trade Union Congress. He served at multiple posts throughout his life such as president of the All India Bank Employees Association, vice-president of Canara Bank Employees Union, president of the All India Bank Employees Association and secretary of the All India Trade Union Congress for Odisha state.

== Biography ==
He was born around 1948 in Jajpur district. He had four children, including three sons and a daughter. Prior to appearing in organized labour, he initially worked in Canara Bank until he retired from the public financial institution.

He was sometimes involved in book writing. He wrote several books and biographies in particular. The recipient of Odia Sahitya Akademi Award for a biographical book titled Manabatara Mahatirtha which was published in 2012, he wrote biographies such as Paramahansa Ramakrushna and Rashtranirmata Nehru. He also wrote two books on children literature titled Deshapremi Swami Vivekananda and Babasaheb Ambedkar. He was also engaged in writing short stories during which he wrote two novels titled Pratidhwani, Echharama Putra and a prose titled Vedantara Swara. In 2016, he was awarded Biju Shramik Bandhu Samman award, consisting of INR50,000 along with a citation by the then chief minister Naveen Patnaik.

== Death ==
He was suffering from liver disease and chronic bronchitis for which he was under medical observation at the Kalinga Institute of Medical Sciences in Bhubaneswar where he died on 3 April 2020 around 10 pm.
