= Gummadi Narsaiah =

Indian politician

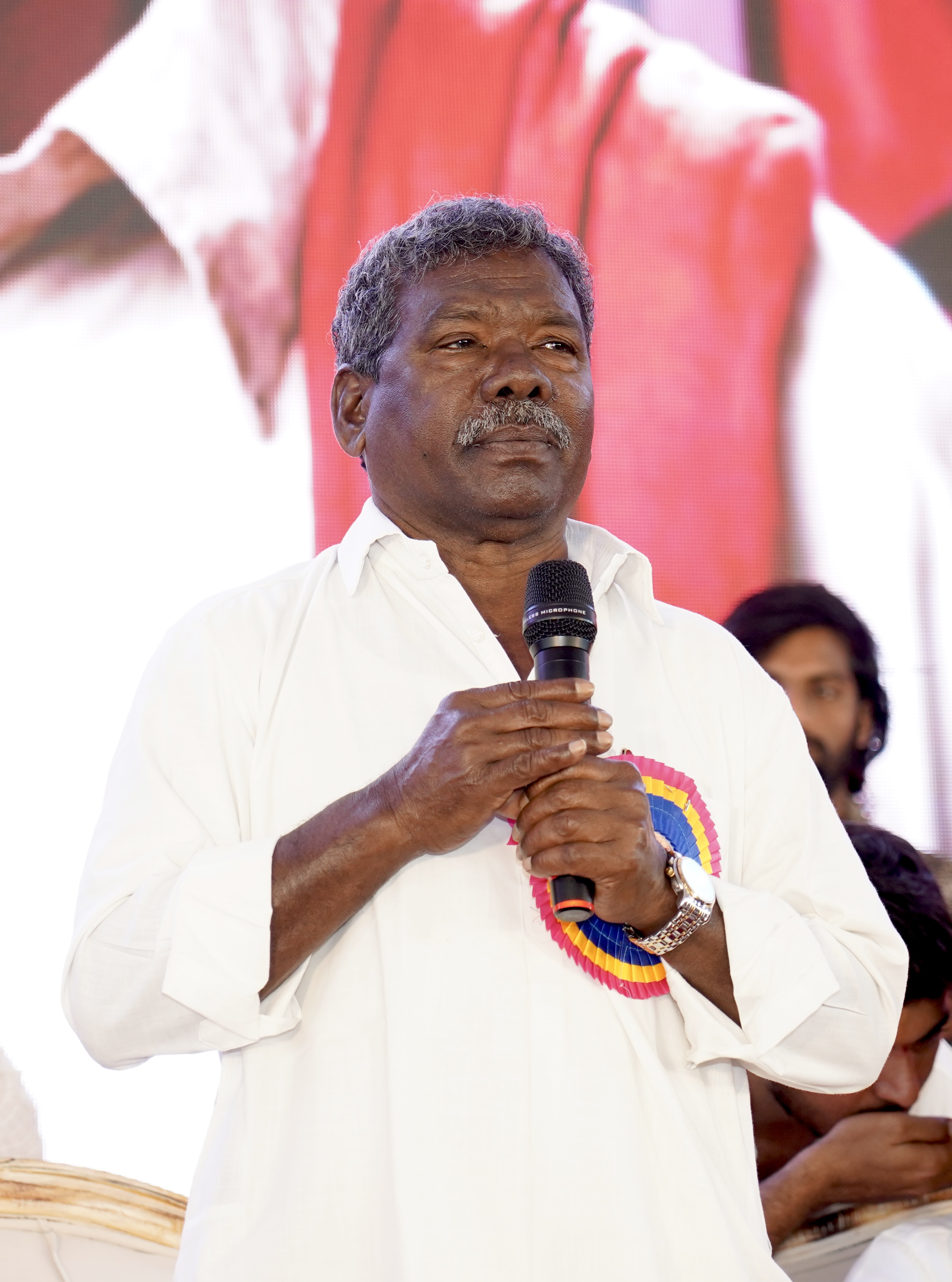
- Gummadi Narsaiah at his Biopic Pooja Ceremony

Member of Legislative Assembly, United Andhra Pradesh
- In office 1983–1994
- Preceded by: Yerraiah Chapala
- Succeeded by: Vooke Abbaiah
- Constituency: Yellandu
- In office 1999–2009
- Preceded by: Vooke Abbaiah
- Succeeded by: Vooke Abbaiah
- Constituency: Yellandu

Personal details
- Party: Communist Party of India (Marxist–Leninist) New Democracy
- Children: Gummadi Anuradha
- Occupation: Politician

Gummadi Narsaiah is an Indian politician and leading member of Communist Party of India (Marxist–Leninist) New Democracy or CPI (ML). He was a member of the Legislative Assembly of Telangana for Yellandu between 1983–1994 and 1999–2009, elected as an independent. He has earned a reputation among members in the constituency as a people's man. Narsaiah was defeated by the Telugu Desam Party candidate Vooke Abbaiah in 2009 Assembly elections.

In 2000 Narsaiah was a leader in a movement against rising electricity tariff rates and more recently in demonstrations for forestry rights. Parameshwar Hivrale directed a biopic based on the lifestyle of Gummadi Narsaiah.

== Career ==
Gummadi Narsaiah began his political career in 1978 after becoming aware of the problems facing farmers and the brutal treatment of tribal people. He served as Tekulapalli Village's sarpanch (Village Headman) in the beginning of his political career.

Narsaiah contested in the 1983 state election and won the Yellandu constituency, becoming an MLA. He continued his career by winning the state elections in 1985 and 1989 consecutively. He has served a total of 5 terms as the Yellandu constituency's MLA. Narsaiah belongs to the unregistered political party CPI (ML), and he contested elections as an independent candidate. As an independent candidate his election symbol changed with every term, but despite this and very low capital invested by Narsaiah for his campaign, he won the elections because the people of the constituency believed him to be a "Prajala Manishi" (peoples man).

== Publications ==
- "An Open Letter to Chief Minister over the Atrocities on the Tribals Committed by the State's Police"), published in February 1986.
