= Tanubai Birje =

Indian journalist and activist (1876–1913)

Tanubai Birje (1876-1913) was a social activist and a member of Satyashodhak Samaj—Truth Seekers' Society—founded by Mahatma Jotirao Phule. She edited the magazine Deenbandhu from 1908 through 1912. She was the first Indian woman to edit a news magazine.

== Early life ==
Tanubai was born in 1876. Her father Deorao Krushnarao Thosar was a government employee and a colleague of Mahatma Jotirao Phule. She had her primary education in a school established by Savitribai Phule. She was married to Vasudeorao Lingoji Birje on 26 January 1893. The marriage was solemnized by Satyashodhak method, i.e. without a Brahmin priest.

Deenbandhu was a news magazine established in 1877 by Krishnarao Bhalekar to popularize Satyashodhak Samaj's ideology. Tanubai's husband Vasudeorao edited the magazine from 1903 till his death in 1908. After his death, Tanubai assumed the editorial responsibilities herself.

She died in 1913.

== Sources ==
- Ugale, G. A. दीनबंधु आणि तानुबाई बिर्जे (in Marathi). Swaroop Prakashan.
- "तानुबाई बिर्जे : शतकापूर्वीची मराठी स्त्री-संपादक" (in Marathi). Loksatta. 2016-03-06. Archived from the original on 2021-10-17.
