= Yellandu Assembly constituency =

Constituency of the Telangana legislative assembly in India

Coordinates: 17.59°N 80.32°E

Yellandu
- Constituency No. 111 for the Telangana Legislative Assembly
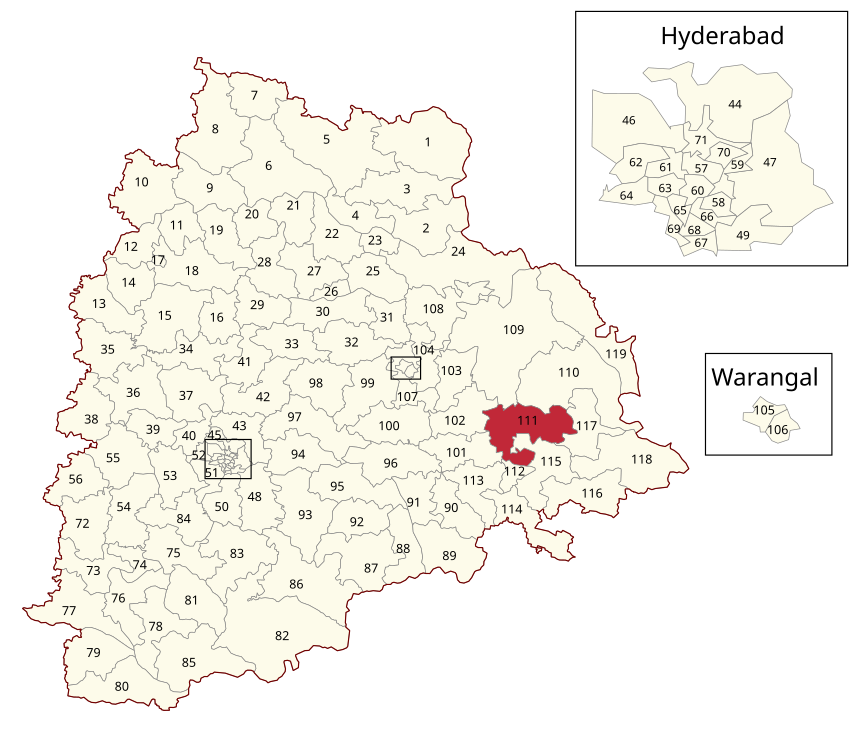
- Location of Yellandu Assembly constituency within Telangana

Constituency details
- Country: India
- Region: South India
- State: Telangana
- District: Khammam
- Lok Sabha constituency: Mahabubabad
- Established: 1951
- Total electors: 1,84,676
- Reservation: ST

Member of Legislative Assembly
- 3rd Telangana Legislative Assembly
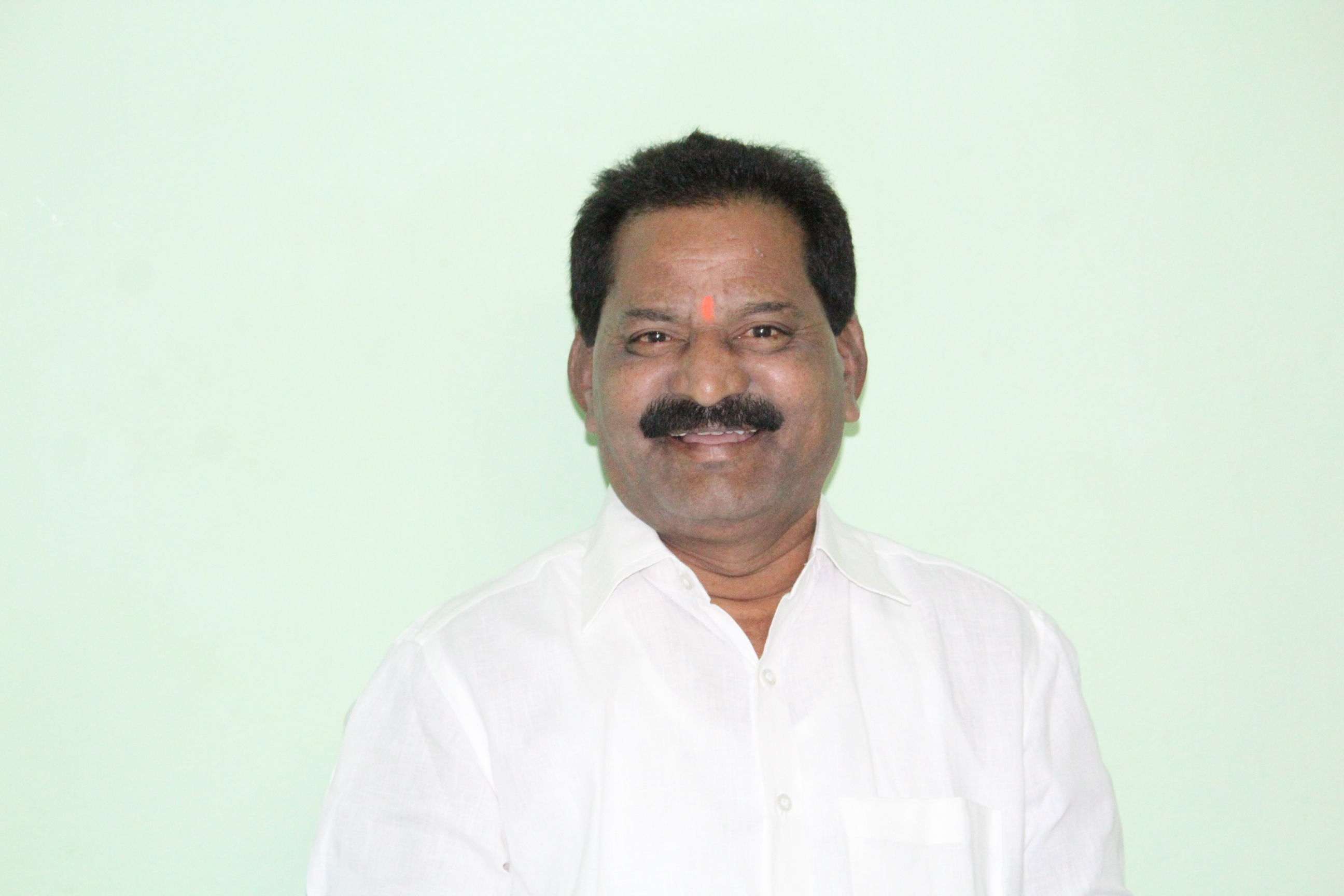
- Incumbent Koram Kanakaiah
- Party: Indian National Congress
- Elected year: 2023

Yellandu Assembly constituency is a Scheduled Tribe reserved constituency of Telangana Legislative Assembly, India. It is one among five constituencies in Bhadradri Kothagudem district. It is part of Mahabubabad Lok Sabha constituency.

== Mandals ==
The Assembly Constituency presently comprises the following mandals:

Mandal	Districts
Yellandu	Bhadradri Kothagudem
Kamepalli	Khammam
Bayyaram	Mahabubabad
Tekulapalli	Bhadradri Kothagudem
Garla	Mahabubabad

== Members of the Legislative Assembly ==
Year	Member	Political party
Hyderabad State
1952 (Note: It was Dual Member constituencies) (Note: Dual-member constituencies (or double-member constituencies) were a short-lived electoral system in India used during the 1951-1952 and 1957 general elections. Each of these constituencies elected two representatives to a single legislative district: one from the general category and one reserved for a Scheduled Caste (SC) or Scheduled Tribe (ST).)	K. L. Narasimha Rao	People's Democratic Front
1952	Vooke Nagaiah	Socialist Party
Andhra Pradesh
1957	K. L. Narasimha Rao	Communist Party of India
1957	T. Venkata Papayya	Indian National Congress
1962	K. L. Narasimha Rao	Communist Party of India
1967	G. Satyanarayana Rao	Indian National Congress
1972	Vanga Subba Rao	Indian National Congress
1978	Yerraiah Chapala	Independent politician
1983	Gummadi Narsaiah	Communist Party of India (Marxist–Leninist) Liberation
1985	Gummadi Narsaiah	Communist Party of India (Marxist–Leninist) Liberation
1989	Gummadi Narsaiah	Communist Party of India (Marxist–Leninist) Liberation
1994	Vooke Abbaiah	Communist Party of India
1999	Gummadi Narsaiah	Communist Party of India (Marxist–Leninist) Liberation
2004	Gummadi Narsaiah	Communist Party of India (Marxist–Leninist) Liberation
2009	Vooke Abbaiah	Telugu Desam Party
Telangana
2014	Koram Kanakaiah	Indian National Congress
2018	Banoth Haripriya	Indian National Congress
2023	Koram Kanakaiah	Indian National Congress

== Election results ==
Vote share of Winning candidates
2023	61.22%
2018	42.95%
2014	29.82%
2009	30.50%
2004	35.67%
1999	41.20%
1994	39.98%
1989	39.06%
1985	39.84%
1983	31.27%
1978	25.35%
1972	46.58%
1967	39.05%
1962	54.42%
1957	26.40%
1957	22.52%
1952	49.41%
1952	15.45%

=== 2023 ===
2023 Telangana Legislative Assembly election: Yellandu (ST)
Party	Candidate	Votes	%	±%
INC	Koram Kanakaiah	109,171	61.22	
BRS	Haripriya Banoth	51,862	29.08	
BJP	Dharavath Ravinder Naik	2,568	1.44	
CPI(M)	Krishna Duggi	2,137	1.20	
NOTA	None of the Above	1,418	0.80	
BSP	Badavath Prathap	1,159	0.65	
AIFB	Cheemala Venkateswarlu	1,087	0.61	
IND	9 Independent Candidates	7,645	4.29	
OTH	5 Other Party Candidates	1,292	0.72	
Majority		57,309	32.14	
Turnout		178,339		
INC hold		Swing		

=== 2018 ===
2018 Telangana Legislative Assembly election: Yellandu (ST)
Party	Candidate	Votes	%	±%
INC	Haripriya Banoth	70,644	42.95	
TRS	Koram Kanakaiah	67,757	41.20	
IND	Gummadi Narsaiah	12,899	7.84	
IND	Yadallapalli Satyam	2,871	1.75	
BJP	Naaga Sravanthi Mokalla	1,975	1.20	
NOTA	None of the Above	1,915	1.16	
AAP	Hanuma Mood	891	0.54	
IND	10 Independent Candidates	5,519	3.36	
Majority		2,887	1.75	
Turnout		164,471	83.49	
INC hold		Swing		

=== 2014 ===
2014 Andhra Pradesh Legislative Assembly election: Yellandu (ST)
Party	Candidate	Votes	%	±%
INC	Koram Kanakaiah	44,945	29.82	
TDP	Haripriya Banoth	33,438	22.18	
TRS	Vooke Abbaiah	20,865	13.84	
IND	Gummadi Narsaiah	19,343	12.83	
YSRCP	Dr. Gugulothu Ravi Babu	13,993	9.28	
IND	Yadallapally Satyam	5,990	3.97	
IND	Padiga Yarraiah	4,401	2.92	
IND	Subash Chandra Arem	2,866	1.90	
NOTA	None of the Above	1,173	0.78	
IND	Vankudoth Koteswar Rao	1,127	0.75	
IND	Punem Srinivas	794	0.53	
IND	Messu Raja Shekar	448	0.30	
AAP	Moodu Hanuma	399	0.26	
JSP	Mukthi Raju	363	0.24	
IND	Guguloth Vijaya	300	0.20	
IND	Amgothu Siva Kumar	293	0.19	
Majority		11,507	7.64	
Turnout		150,738	81.62	
Swing to INC from TDP		Swing		

=== 2009 ===
2009 Andhra Pradesh Legislative Assembly election: Yellandu (ST)
Party	Candidate	Votes	%	±%
TDP	Vooke Abbaiah	41,605	30.50	
INC	Koram Kanakaiah	38,659	28.34	
IND	Gummadi Narsaiah	28,858	21.15	
PRP	Shankar Banoth	17,590	12.89	
IND	Ravi Chepuri	1,488	1.09	
IND	Hari Sing Banothu	1,422	1.04	
BSP	Krishna Malothu	1,326	0.97	
BJP	Krishna Mohan Singh Porika	979	0.72	
PPOI	Seetharam Boda	899	0.66	
IND	Srinivas Punem	867	0.64	
IND	Chandar Rao Malothu	816	0.60	
IND	Narasimha Rao Eesam	716	0.52	
IND	Yerraiah Padiga	708	0.52	
IND	Balu Badavath	482	0.35	
Majority		2,946	2.16	
Turnout		136,415		
Swing to TDP from Independent		Swing		

=== 2004 ===
2004 Andhra Pradesh Legislative Assembly election: Yellandu (ST)
Party	Candidate	Votes	%	±%
IND	Gummadi Narsaiah	45,956	35.67	
TDP	Kalpanabai Malothu	34,030	26.41	
INC	Dr. Bhaskar Naik Bukya	30,495	23.67	
IND	Koram Kanakaiah	14,580	11.32	
IND	Namanayak Islavath	1,935	1.50	
IND	Tholam Narasaiah	1,851	1.44	
Majority		11,926	9.26	
Turnout		128,847		
Independent hold		Swing		

=== 1999 ===
1999 Andhra Pradesh Legislative Assembly election: Yellandu (ST)
Party	Candidate	Votes	%	±%
IND	Gummadi Narsaiah	47,806	41.20	
INC	Bhukya Dalsingh	28,519	24.58	
IND	Vooke Abbaiah	22,079	19.03	
CPI	Eswary Surabaka	14,242	12.27	
MCPI(S)	Eslawathu China Nama	1,996	1.72	
IND	Kalthi Narayana	625	0.54	
IND	Vajja Ramulu	446	0.38	
IND	Krishna Mohan Singh	328	0.28	
Majority		19,287	16.62	
Turnout		121,065	76.84	
Swing to Independent from CPI		Swing		

=== 1994 ===
1994 Andhra Pradesh Legislative Assembly election: Yellandu (ST)
Party	Candidate	Votes	%	±%
CPI	Vooke Abbaiah	44,191	39.98	
IND	Gummadi Narsaiah	38,116	34.49	
INC	Somla Naik Banoth	22,116	20.01	
BJP	Banoth Lalu	1,923	1.74	
IND	Jaggaiah Vagaboyina	1,332	1.21	
IND	Bolli Venkateswarlu	879	0.80	
IND	Lalu Banoth	494	0.45	
IND	Rajya Dharavath	428	0.39	
AIMIM	Veeraswamy Veesam	382	0.35	
IND	Venakateswarlu Mugiti	269	0.24	
IND	Bhadru Maloth	244	0.22	
SP	Banoth Manya Naik	146	0.13	
Majority		6,075	5.49	
Turnout		112,989	77.34	
Swing to CPI from Independent		Swing		

=== 1989 ===
1989 Andhra Pradesh Legislative Assembly election: Yellandu (ST)
Party	Candidate	Votes	%	±%
IND	Gummadi Narsaiah	38,388	39.06	
CPI	Vooke Abbaiah	30,705	31.24	
INC	Banoth Somla Naiak	29,197	29.70	
Majority		7,683	7.82	
Turnout		103,694	75.06	
Independent hold		Swing		

=== 1985 ===
1985 Andhra Pradesh Legislative Assembly election: Yellandu (ST)
Party	Candidate	Votes	%	±%
IND	Gummadi Narsaiah	29,276	39.84	
CPI	Payam Muthiah	23,480	31.95	
INC	Punem Ramchandraiah	16,919	23.02	
IND	Chapala Yerraiah	1,628	2.22	
IND	Madhya Banothu	1,084	1.48	
IND	Doravathu Rajya	503	0.68	
IND	Kalti Narayana	251	0.34	
IND	Messu Bikshamaiah	236	0.32	
IND	Gugulthu Ramulu	104	0.14	
Majority		5,796	7.89	
Turnout		75,049	68.15	
Independent hold		Swing		

=== 1983 ===
1983 Andhra Pradesh Legislative Assembly election: Yellandu (ST)
Party	Candidate	Votes	%	±%
IND	Gummadi Narsaiah	19,202	31.27	
INC	Somala Nayaku Banothu	16,736	27.25	
CPI(M)	Gogulothu Dharma	15,493	25.23	
IND	Bhajya Ajmeera	9,979	16.25	
Majority		2,466	4.02	
Turnout		62,948	68.83	
Independent hold		Swing		

=== 1978 ===
1978 Andhra Pradesh Legislative Assembly election: Yellandu (ST)
Party	Candidate	Votes	%	±%
IND	Yerraiah Chapala	14,897	25.35	
CPI(M)	Kangala Buchaiah	14,559	24.77	
INC(I)	Somulu Bonathu	13,137	22.35	
INC	Komaram Ramaiah	12,347	21.01	
IND	Mokalla Papaiah	2,823	4.80	
IND	Laxmaiah Jare	1,006	1.71	
Majority		338	0.58	
Turnout		61,118	75.94	
Swing to Independent from INC		Swing		

=== 1972 ===
1972 Andhra Pradesh Legislative Assembly election: Yellandu
Party	Candidate	Votes	%	±%
INC	Vanga Subba Rao	22,761	46.58	
CPI	B. Pamakoteswara Rao	10,935	22.38	
CPI(M)	Eluri Lakshmi Narayana	10,601	21.69	
IND	Ajmeera Bhajya	1,475	3.02	
ABJS	Banoth Harya Yema	1,388	2.84	
IND	Patangay Jalram	928	1.90	
STS	Kalisehi Bhikshapathi	776	1.59	
Majority		11,826	24.20	
Turnout		50,441	66.33	
INC hold		Swing		

=== 1967 ===
1967 Andhra Pradesh Legislative Assembly election: Yellandu
Party	Candidate	Votes	%	±%
INC	G. Satyanarayana Rao	18,004	39.05	
CPI	R. R. Bodempudi	12,256	26.58	
CPI(M)	K. L. Narasimha Rao	11,825	25.65	
IND	L. S. Banoth	1,559	3.38	
IND	N. Kaza	1,241	2.69	
ABJS	P. C. Kotagiri	1,219	2.64	
Majority		5,748	12.47	
Turnout		48,656	76.74	
Swing to INC from CPI		Swing		

=== 1962 ===
1962 Andhra Pradesh Legislative Assembly election: Yellandu
Party	Candidate	Votes	%	±%
CPI	K. L. Narasimha Rao	21,557	54.42	
INC	Bommakanati Satyanarayana Rao	14,914	37.65	
SWA	Gogineni Satyanarayana Rao	3,144	7.94	
Majority		6,643	16.77	
Turnout		41,666	70.34	
CPI win (new seat)				

=== 1957 ===
1957 Andhra Pradesh Legislative Assembly election: Yellandu (ST)
Party	Candidate	Votes	%	±%
PDF	K. L. Narasimha Rao	32,529	26.40	
INC	T. Venkata Papayya	27,747	22.52	
INC	Dodda Narsiah (ST)	24,730	20.07	
PDF	K. Buchaiah	24,408	19.81	
PSP	B. Balaji	8,495	6.89	
PSP	V. Nagamaiah (ST)	5,319	4.32	
Majority		4,782	3.88	
Turnout		123,228	116.08	
PDF hold		Swing		
Swing to INC from Socialist		Swing		

=== 1952 ===
1952 Hyderabad State Legislative Assembly election: Yellandu (2 seats)
Party	Candidate	Votes	%	±%
PDF	K. L. Narasimha Rao	27,632	49.41	
Socialist	Vooke Nagaiah	8,639	15.45	
Socialist	K. Somayajulu	7,569	13.53	
IND	Soyam Ramgovindam	6,608	11.82	
IND	R. Sankariah	5,475	9.79	
Majority		18,993	33.96	
Turnout		55,923	53.30	
PDF win (new seat)				
Socialist win (new seat)				

== See also ==
- List of constituencies of Telangana Legislative Assembly
