= Madiraju Ranga Rao =

Indian Telugu poet, scholar, and professor (1935–2025)

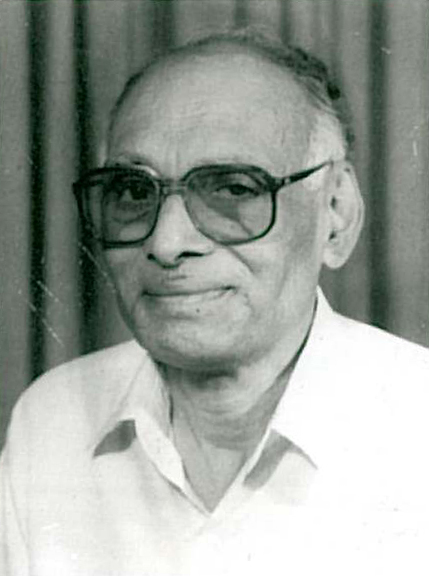
- Prof. Madiraju Ranga Rao
- Born: 8 June 1935; Pandithapuram, Yellandu, Khammam district, Hyderabad State (now Telangana, India)
- Died: 21 June 2025 (aged 90); Shantinagar, Hyderabad, Telangana, India
- Alma mater: Osmania University
- Occupations: Poet, academic, literary critic
- Spouse: Madiraju Indira Devi
- Writing career
- Language: Telugu, Sanskrit
- Notable works: Swecchaa Kavitvamu (Vol. 1–9), Kavitraya Kavitha Reethulu, Maanaveeyam
- Notable awards: Kakatiya University Best Teacher Award (1992); Potti Sreeramulu Telugu University Best Modern Poetry Award (1993); Senior Fellowship, Ministry of Human Resource Development (1994)
- Movements: Modern Telugu poetry, Swecchaa Kavitvamu (Free Verse Movement)
- Website: madirajurangarao.com

Madiraju Ranga Rao (8 June 1935 – 21 June 2025) was an Indian Telugu poet, scholar, and professor of literature. He was a leading figure in post-independence Telugu literature, best known as the pioneer and foremost theoretician of Swecchaa Kavitvamu (Free Verse Poetry). Over a literary career spanning seven decades, he authored approximately 160 volumes of free verse poetry—compiled into nine major anthologies and four supplementary collections—alongside more than 20 scholarly works in literary criticism, Sanskrit poetics, and prosody.

== Early life ==
Madiraju Ranga Rao was born on 8 June 1935 in the village of Pandithapuram, near Yellandu in the Khammam district of the former Hyderabad State (present-day Telangana, India). He was the son of Narayana Rao and Lakshmi Devi. Raised in a traditional scholarly family, he acquired early proficiency in classical Sanskrit texts and ancient Telugu poetry during the political transition of Hyderabad State's integration into the Indian Union.

== Education ==
Ranga Rao completed his school and intermediate education in Khammam and Warangal. He subsequently attended Osmania University in Hyderabad, where he earned a Master of Arts in Sanskrit (1960) and a Master of Arts in Telugu Literature with first-class honors (1962). Under the supervision of scholar B. Rama Raju, he conducted doctoral research on classical epic structures, receiving his Ph.D. in 1966 for his thesis titled Kavitraya Kavitha Reethulu (Poetic Styles of the Kavitrayam).

== Academic career ==
Ranga Rao began his academic career as a lecturer in Telugu at Osmania University in 1964. In 1968, he relocated to Warangal to join the Osmania University Postgraduate Centre, which in 1976 was established as Kakatiya University. He served on the founding faculty of Kakatiya University's Department of Telugu, subsequently holding administrative roles as Head of the Department of Telugu, Chairman of the Board of Studies, and Dean of the Faculty of Arts. During his tenure, he supervised 12 M.Phil. and 10 Ph.D. research dissertations before retiring as Senior Professor in 1995.

== Literary contribution ==
=== Free Verse Movement (Swecchaa Kavitvamu) ===
While rigorously trained in classical Sanskrit and Telugu metres, Ranga Rao championed free verse as the authentic poetic medium of democratic society. Beginning in the late 1950s, he formulated the aesthetic principles of Swecchaa Kavitvamu, asserting that modern poetic consciousness required liberation from rigid metrical confines while retaining organic rhythmic discipline. His poetry is distinguished by its synthesis of universal humanism, social justice, and philosophical introspection. His free-verse output comprises nine collected volumes (Volumes I–IX) and notable individual collections including Maanaveeyam, Mukthadhatri (2025), and Swecchaa Payanam (2025).

=== Literary criticism and scholarly research ===
Ranga Rao published over 20 critical and analytical volumes, including:

- Kavitraya Kavitha Reethulu (1966) — Doctoral study of Nannaya, Tikkana, and Errana.
- Mahaprasthanam Samalochanam (2009) — Critical analysis of Sri Sri's revolutionary poetry.
- Srujana Drushti Maanaveeya Bhaavanam (2006) — Treatise on modern literary aesthetics.
- Navala Swaroopa Samalochanam (2001) — Comprehensive analysis of the Telugu novel.

== Awards and honors ==
- Best Teacher Award (1992): Conferred by Kakatiya University for academic and research excellence.
- Best Modern Poetry Award (1993): Awarded by Potti Sreeramulu Telugu University for contributions to modern Telugu free verse.
- Senior Fellowship (1994): Awarded by the Ministry of Human Resource Development, Government of India, for research in comparative Indian poetics.

== Death ==
Ranga Rao died of age-related complications at his residence in Shantinagar, Hyderabad, on 21 June 2025, at the age of 90. Cultural institutions including the Telangana Sahitya Academy and faculties from Osmania and Kakatiya universities issued official condolence statements.
