= Bethampudi =

Village in Telangana, India

- Village
- Location within Telangana Location within India
- Coordinates: 17°35′09″N 80°30′53″E
- Country: India
- State: Telangana
- District: Bhadradri Kothagudem
- Mandal: Tekulapalli

Government
  - Type: Gram Sabha

Area
  - Total: 138.9 km^{2} (53.6 sq mi)
- Elevation: 161 m (528 ft)

Population (2011)
  - Total: 25,461
  - Density: 183.3/km^{2} (474.8/sq mi)

Languages
  - Official: Telugu
  - Other: Urdu, English
- Time zone: UTC+5:30 (IST)
- PIN: 507123
- STD code: 08741
- Vehicle registration: TS-28

Bethampudi is a village in Tekulapalli Mandal, Bhadradri Kothagudem District, Telangana, India. It is located near the boundary with Khammam District, approximately 12 kilometres west of the district seat Kothagudem, and 6 kilometres northeast of the mandal seat Tekulapalli. In 2011, the village has a total population of 25,461.

== Geography ==
Bethampudi is located west of the Godavari River. It is connected to the National Highway 930P on the south. Its average elevation is 161 metres above the sea level.

== Demographics ==
According to the 2011 Census of India, Bethampudi includes 6,619 households. Among the 25,461 residents, 12,747 are male and 12,714 are female. The total literacy rate is 49.92%, with 7,368 of the male population and 5,343 of the female population being literate. The census location code of Bethampudi is 579394.
