= Kondapalli Lakshminarasimha Rao =

Biography of a politician from Telangana

Kondapalli Lakshminarasimha Rao, is an Indian politician from Telangana. He has served as the first MLA from the Yellandu Assembly Constituency for three consecutive terms.
