= Deenbandhu =

Indian newspaper

Deenbandhu, sometimes transliterated as Dinbandhu and spelled Din Bandhu, was a weekly Marathi-language newspaper first published in Pune, British India in January 1877. It was the first newspaper in India to cater explicitly to the labouring people. The weekly articulated the grievances of the peasants and workers.

Deenbandhu was founded by Krishnarao Pandurang Bhalekar (1850-1910) and served as an outlet for Jotirao Phule's Satyashodhak Samaj. Bhalekar was born in Bhamburde and came of a Mali family. Bhalekar ran Dinbandhu almost single-handedly till April 1880 after which the newspaper moved to Mumbai because of financial troubles. Narayan Meghaji Lokhande, who had already been writing for it, edited the newspaper from Mumbai from 1880. Deenbandhu was selling 1650 copies per week in 1884, thus making it the second-highest circulation Marathi or Anglo-Marathi newspaper in Bombay Presidency, after Kesari. Vasudeo Birje became the editor of this iconic newspaper in 1903 after he left Baroda and moved to Mumbai. After Birje's untimely death due to cholera, his wife Tanubai Birje took the responsibility of running the newspaper on her own. She was 32. Tanubai Birje edited Dinbandhu from 1908 till she died in 1913. According to Shriram Gundekar, Tanubai Birje is the first woman editor in the history of non-Brahmin journalism. It's possible that she was the first woman editor in Marathi journalism itself.

While Lokhande published the Deenbandhu from Bombay, Vithhal Marutrao Nawle, an admirer of Phule, bought the rights to publish an edition in Pune. He imported a printing press from Ohio that continued to produce the newspaper until it ceased publication in the 1970s. That press still existed in Pune in 2013 and was still owned by the Nawle family. however, it was in a state of considerable disrepair and decay. The state government was considering whether it could be preserved.
