= Narayan Meghaji Lokhande =

Founder of the trade union movement in India

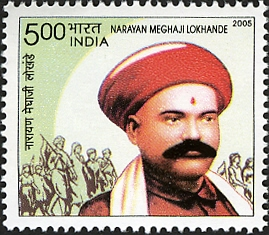
- Lokhande on a 2005 stamp of Maharashtra
- Born: c. 1848; Thane, Maharashtra, India
- Died: 9 February 1897; Mumbai, India
- Movement: Trade Union Movement in India

Narayan Meghaji Lokhande (c. 1848–1897) was the father of trade union movement in India. He is remembered not only for ameliorating the working conditions of textile 19th century but also for his courageous initiatives on caste and communal issues. Apart from this he was also awarded the title of Rao Bahadur in 1895 for his work during riots between Hindus and Muslims. "Justice of peace" was awarded with great respect to him by the then British Indian Government. The Government of India issued a postage stamp with his photograph in 2005.

== Social contribution ==
Narayan Meghaji Lokhande was a prominent colleague of Mahatma Jyotiba Phule and a member of Satyashodhak Samaj. He was born in a Mali family from Kanhersar in Pune district. He had been educated up to high school. His wife's name was Gopikabai and had a son named Gopinath. He learned of the Satyashodhak movement early enough to become a member in its second year in 1874.

Lokhande is acclaimed as the Father of the Trade Union Movement in India. From 1880 onwards he took over the management of Deenbandhu which was published from Mumbai. At this time he also quit his job as head clerk in a cotton mill in Mumbai and founded Millhands' Association, devoting himself fully to social service.

Along with Lokhande, Phule also addressed the meetings of the textile workers in Bombay. It is significant that before Phule and his colleagues Krishnarao Bhalekar and Lokhande tried to organise the peasants and the workers, no such attempt was made by any organisation to redress their grievances. Lokhande started the first labour association in India — 'Bombay Mill Hands Association'.

Some of the rights mill workers got because of N M Lokhande were:

- Mill workers should get a weekly holiday on Sunday.
- In the afternoon, workers should be entitled to half-hour recess.
- The mill should start working from 6:30 in the morning and close by sunset.
- The salaries of the workers should be given by the 15th of every month.

He was awarded the title of Rao Bahudur by the British Raj. He established 'Mumbai Kamgar Sangh'.
