= Bojja Bixamaiah =

Indian trade unionist

Bojja Bixamaiah is an Indian communist politician and trade unionist, active amongst coal miners at the Singareni Collieries Company Limited in Andhra Pradesh. As of 2005, B. Bixamaiah was the president of the Singareni Collieries Employees Union, which is affiliated to the Centre of Indian Trade Unions.

== Biography ==
B. Bixamaiah had previously been a leader of the Communist Party of India (Marxist-Leninist) New Democracy. He served as president of their miners union at the Singareni coal fields, Godavari Loya Boggugani Karmika Sangham, and as president of the Andhra Pradesh State Committee of the Indian Federation of Trade Unions. He was also a member of the Andhra Pradesh State Committee of the party. B. Bixamaiah was expelled from CPI(ML)-New Democracy of 9 April 2003. On 10 July 2003 he announced his entry into the Communist Party of India (Marxist), along with other dissidents from CPI(ML)-New Democracy and its mass organisations, at a press conference in Hyderabad.

B. Bixamaiah has stood as a candidate for elections several times. In the 1983 Andhra Pradesh legislative assembly election he finished in fourth place in the Myadaram constituency, polling 7,274 votes (9.91%). In the 1989 Andhra Pradesh legislative assembly election, he finished third in the Myadaram constituency with 4,430 votes (4.15%). He contested the 1991 Lok Sabha election from Peddapalli constituency, obtaining 12,248 votes (2.44%). In the 1998 Lok Sabha election B. Bixamaiah finished in fourth place in the Warangal constituency with 17,357 votes (2.23%). In the 1999 Lok Sabha election he contested from the Peddapalli constituency, finishing fourth with 10,183 votes (1.18%).
