= All India Bank Officers' Confederation =

Trade union in India

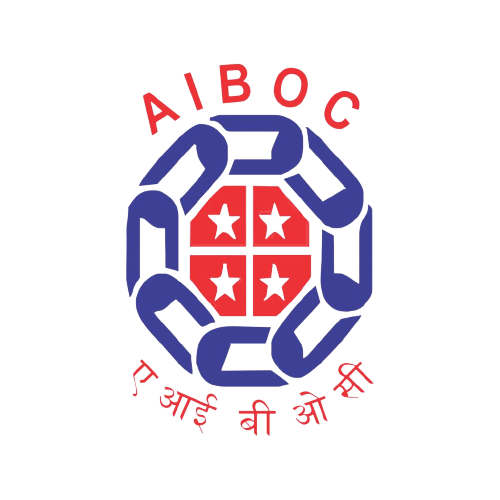
- LOGO of All India Bank Officer' Confederation
- Abbreviation: AIBOC
- Founded: 6 October 1985
- Headquarters: New Delhi, India
- Members: Over 300,000 (as of 2024)
- Key people: R Sekaran (President), Rupam Roy (General Secretary)
- Affiliations: United Forum of Bank Unions
- Website: aiboc.org

All India Bank Officers' Confederation (AIBOC) is one of the largest trade union bodies of bank officers in India. It is an Indian trade union federation representing supervisory and managerial cadre officers in public sector, private sector and regional rural banks across India. Founded on 6 October 1985, AIBOC is among the largest officers' unions in Indian banking, it also represents over 300,000 officers across public sector banks, private sector banks, co-operative banks, and regional rural banks across the country and is a constituent of the United Forum of Bank Unions (UFBU), the umbrella body of major bank unions in India.

== History ==
- Before AIBOC, officers' movements were represented by the All India Confederation of Bank Officers' Organisations (AICOBOO), formed in 1972.AICOBOO led officers' protests against unilateral pay decisions ( such as the Pillai Committee recommendation ) in the late 1970s, including nationwide strikes in 1977-78 that resulted in improved service conditions by 1979.
- August 1985 – AICOBOO Split: Dissatisfaction over undemocratic practices at AICOBOO's 3rd Triennial Conference in Madras led 294 of 506 delegates, led by R.N. Godbole and S.R. Sengupta, to walk out.
- 6 October 1985 – Birth of AIBOC: The dissident group founded the All India Bank Officers' Confederation at FICCI Hall, New Delhi. S.R. Sengupta was elected President and R.N. Godbole General Secretary. Affiliates included officers' bodies from 18 public sector banks, 2 private sector banks, and 1 state-level co-op bank.
- 24 October 1985: IBA recognised AIBOC as the principal bargaining agent.
- 22 January 1986: AIBOC was officially registered as a trade union (Reg. No. 3427, New Delhi).

AIBOC emerged during a period of rapid change in India's financial sector, when nationalised banks employed a large share of banking labour and officers' organisations consolidated at the industry level. Academic literature places the confederation's formation in 1985. According to AIBOC's own historical note, its foundation conference was held on 6 October 1985 in New Delhi.

Industrial relations scholarship of the period identifies AIBOC as a federation that "controls the majority of officers in the industry", with affiliates in most banks, and highlights its role in industry-wide bargaining alongside workmen's unions. Broader accounts of Indian industrial relations also note the consolidation of sector-level unions in banking in the 1980s and 1990s, including officers' federations such as AIBOC.

== Early background (Pre-AIBOC Era) ==
- 1950s–1960s: Bank officers faced poor service conditions—often earning less than clerks, no HRA, inadequate DA, undefined leave rules, heavy workloads, arbitrary promotions and transfers, and lack of medical aid or LFC.
- Inspiration from Workmen's Movement: The All India Bank Employees' Association (AIBEA, founded 1946) secured major gains for workmen through successive tribunals (Shastri, Desai, etc.), but officers were excluded, prompting them to form their own organisations.
- 1960s–1970s: Formation of officers' associations in SBI, Bank of India, Central Bank, UCO Bank, and Union Bank. SBI officers went on a 19-day strike in 1969, a milestone that coincided with the nationalisation of 14 banks.
- 1971 – Formation of AICOBOO:
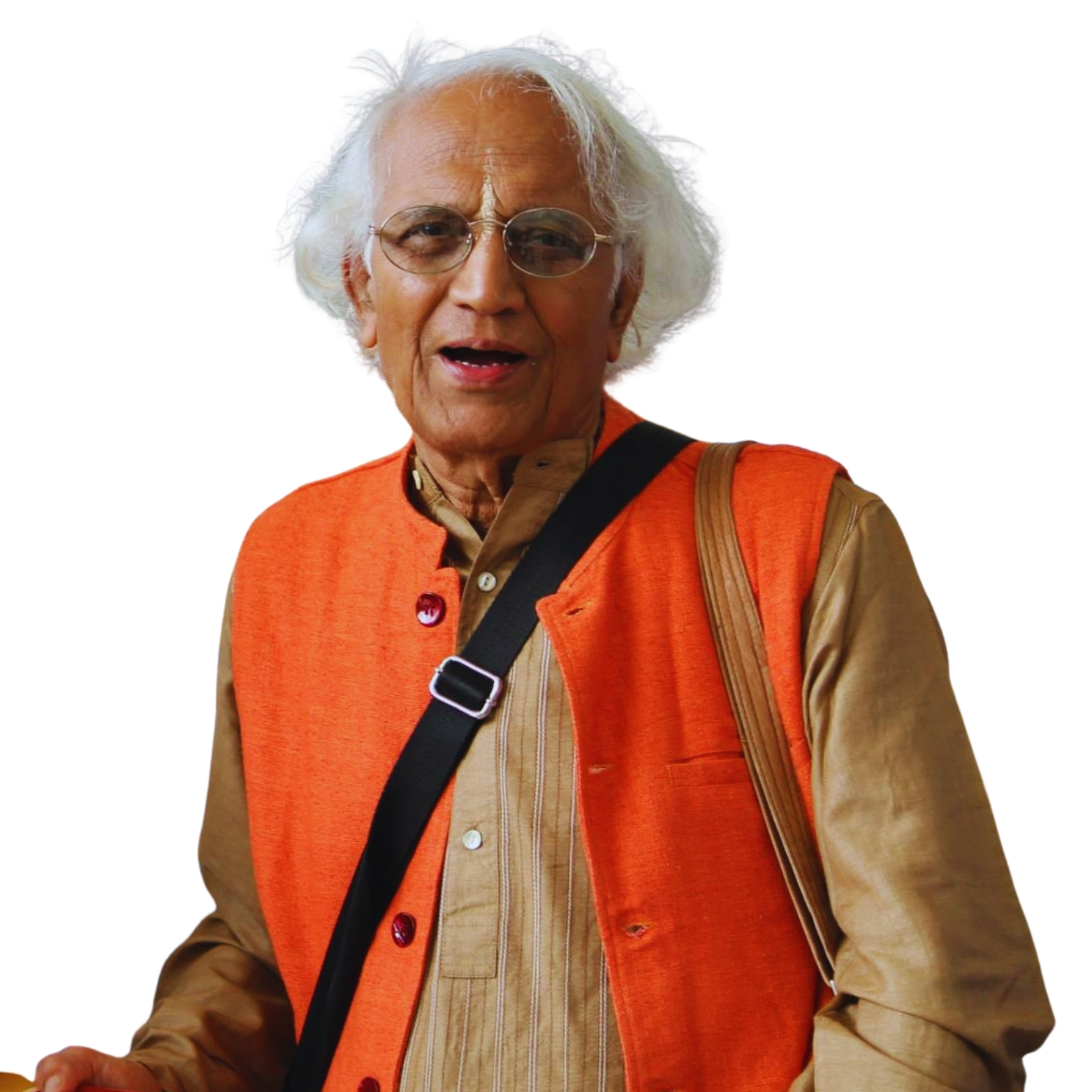
  L.V. Subramaniam, Former Secretary General of AICOBOO
  Following consultations with Finance Minister Y.B. Chavan, the All India Confederation of Bank Officers' Organisations (AICOBOO) was set up, with A.R. Sule as Chairman and L.V. Subramaniam as Secretary General.
- 1973–1979 – Pillai Committee Dispute: The government unilaterally set up the Pillai Committee to standardise officers' pay, sparking widespread protests. AICOBOO organised its first national strike in 1977 and a one-day strike in 1978. Gandhian mediator A.N. Buch secured bilateral talks with IBA, resulting in revised service conditions effective 1979.
- Late 1970s–1980s: Joint actions with AIBEA and other unions strengthened the movement. However, leadership crises and government-backed "Loan Melas" tested AICOBOO's credibility.

== Membership and structure ==
AIBOC functions as a federal body, consisting of national, state, and district-level units. It has affiliated organisations in almost every major public and private sector bank .

Membership has grown from around 75,000 officers at its inception to over 300,000 members as of 2024, making it one of the largest officers’ unions in Asia.

Leadership is elected every three years at the Triennial General Council. The 13th Council was held in Guwahati in July 2024, where P. M. Balachandra was elected President and Rupam Roy re-elected as General Secretary .

AIBOC is functioning as an apex body for supervisory cadre employees. Media coverage and union reports have variously described the confederation as representing "over three lakh" officers nationwide. As of July 2024, press reports described AIBOC as "the largest officers' trade union" in Indian banking.

AIBOC is a constituent of the United Forum of Bank Unions (UFBU), an umbrella coalition of nine major bank unions that coordinates sector-wide actions and negotiations with the Indian Banks' Association (IBA).

== Activities ==
- 1987–1989: Formation of AIRRBOF (1987) and a significant wage revision settlement (11 June 1989) introducing DA parity and revised pay structures.
- 1990: Supreme Court upheld rights of majority unions to nominate officer-directors; Justice Obul Reddy Tribunal granted pay parity to RRB officers.
- 1992: AIBOC convened a National Convention in Delhi opposing New Economic Policies.
- 1993: Pension scheme introduced in banking industry (signed 29 October).
- 1994: Successful strike for computerisation increment and medical benefits.
- 1995: Salary revision agreement (23 June). 4th Triennial Conference held in Bangalore.
- 1997: Formation of United Forum of Bank Unions (UFBU), with Sengupta later as Convener.
- 1998: Retirement age raised to 60 years after sustained demand.
- 1999: Wage settlement (effective 1 November 1997).
- 2000–2001: "Save Banks Campaign" against privatisation; opposition to VRS-2000.
- 2002: Supreme Court upheld "Equal Pay for Equal Work" for RRB officers.
- 2003: Formation of All India Coordination Committee of Unions in Financial Sector (AICCUFS).
- 2004–2005: Salary revision agreement; 20th anniversary celebrations.
- 2006: Independent Commission on Banking & Financial Policy under S.P. Shukla submitted report.
- 2008: 8th Triennial in Chandigarh elected V. Eswaran (President) and G.D. Nadaf (Gen. Sec.).
- 2009: Formation of All India Nationalised Banks Officers' Federation.
- 2010: 6th Joint Note and 9th Bipartite Agreement signed between Unions/ associationswith IBA; pension option and gratuity ceiling raised.
- 2011: 9th Triennial in Bhubaneshwar.
- 2014: 10th Triennial in Thiruvananthapuram; Harvinder Singh elected as General Secretary.
- 2015: 7th Joint Note Signed; introduction of 2nd and 4th Saturdays off.
- 2016–2017: Campaigns against privatisation and FRDI Bill; Marches to Parliament.
- 2017: 11th Triennial in Jaipur elected Dilip K. Saha (President) and D. Thomas Franco Rajendra Dev (Gen. Sec.).
- 2018: Supreme Court verdict granting RRB pension parity; UFBU 48-hour strike (30–31 May).
- 2019: 48 hrs. bank strike deferred after meeting with Finance Secretary
- 2023: commemorated 55th Bank Nationalisation Day(14 July 2023)
- 2024: AIBOC held its 13th Triennial General Council in Guwahati.
- 2025: AIBOC Rallies Against Bank Privatisation on 56th Nationalisation Anniversary

AIBOC campaigns on a range of banking and labour issues:

- Work conditions: Advocates for a five-day workweek, regulated working hours, and staff welfare .
- Recruitment: Presses for adequate hiring to fill vacancies in public sector banks.
- Bank autonomy: Opposes arbitrary directives from the Department of Financial Services (DFS) on performance reviews and productivity-linked incentives .
- Public sector stance: Resists privatisation of public sector banks, advocating for state ownership and regulation.
- Financial inclusion: Calls for adequate staffing in rural branches to support government schemes and inclusion goals.

AIBOC participates in collective bargaining on officers' service conditions through the IBA, and in joint industry campaigns under the UFBU. Coverage by mainstream media records AIBOC's involvement in wage-settlement talks and sector-wide industrial actions, as well as calls for or participation in nationwide strikes in 2025 alongside other UFBU constituents.

The confederation also advocates on policy issues affecting officers and banking services. In November 2024 it publicly pressed for the implementation of a five-day work week for banks and measures to improve staff safety and recruitment, positions that received national media coverage. At its 13th Triennial General Council (July 2024), AIBOC and the Centre for Financial Accountability released the report Where Is My Interest Rate?, critiquing recent shifts in India's banking landscape. Earlier, in February 2019, national press reported an AIBOC-led "mahamorcha" in New Delhi that drew an estimated 20,000 participants.

== Impact and reception ==
Scholarly work has examined the role of sector-level unions in shaping the trajectory of Indian banking since nationalisation. Kar (2018) argues that the "strong presence of unions" in the sector—including the creation of officers' federations such as AIBOC in 1985—was one factor contributing to relatively cautious liberalisation and a stable banking environment compared to other emerging markets. Industrial relations research from the 1990s similarly noted AIBOC's growth and nationwide presence across banks during a period of changing employment relations and management practices in the industry.

On the legal context for union activity, commentary in Economic and Political Weekly has analysed court rulings on the right of unions to demonstrate peacefully in India, reflecting the jurisprudential environment in which banking unions operate. Broader handbooks and surveys of Indian industrial relations reference the consolidation of bank-level unions within sectoral federations in this period.

- Wage and Service Conditions: Multiple settlements (1979, 1989, 1995, 1999, 2004, 2005, 2010, 2015) ensured parity with workmen and RBI officers, DA neutralisation, pension as a third benefit, and improved gratuity.
- Policy Advocacy: Resisted privatisation, foreign takeovers, dilution of PSBs, and RBI/government directives seen as anti-worker. Issued "Alternative Gyan Sangam Suggestions" for public sector banking reform.
- Legal Achievements: Won Supreme Court verdicts on officer-director nominations, RRB pay parity, pension rights, gratuity enhancements, and VRS benefits.
- Trade Union Rights: Consistently defended officers from premature retirements, arbitrary transfers, and "Loan Mela" pressures.
- Social Campaigns: Observed "Anti-Merger Day", "Anti-Privatisation Day", and contributed to relief funds in disasters.

== Leadership ==
- Founding Leaders: President – S.R. Sengupta; General Secretary – R.N. Godbole.
- Later Presidents: Shantha Raju (1997), K.D. Khera (2001), R.C. Agarwal (2004), V. Eswaran (2007), K.S. Shetty (2009), P.K. Sarkar (2010), Dilip K. Saha (2017).
- Later General Secretaries: Sengupta (1995–2001), Shantha Raju (2001–2006), Amar Pal (2007), G.D. Nadaf (2008–2014), Harvinder Singh (2014–2017), D.T. Franco Rajendra Dev (2017).

At the 13th Triennial General Council held in Guwahati in July 2024, AIBOC unanimously re-elected P. M. Balachandra as President and Rupam Roy as General Secretary.

== See also ==
- Trade unions in India
- Banking in India
- Public sector banks in India
