= Koram Kanakaiah =

Indian politician

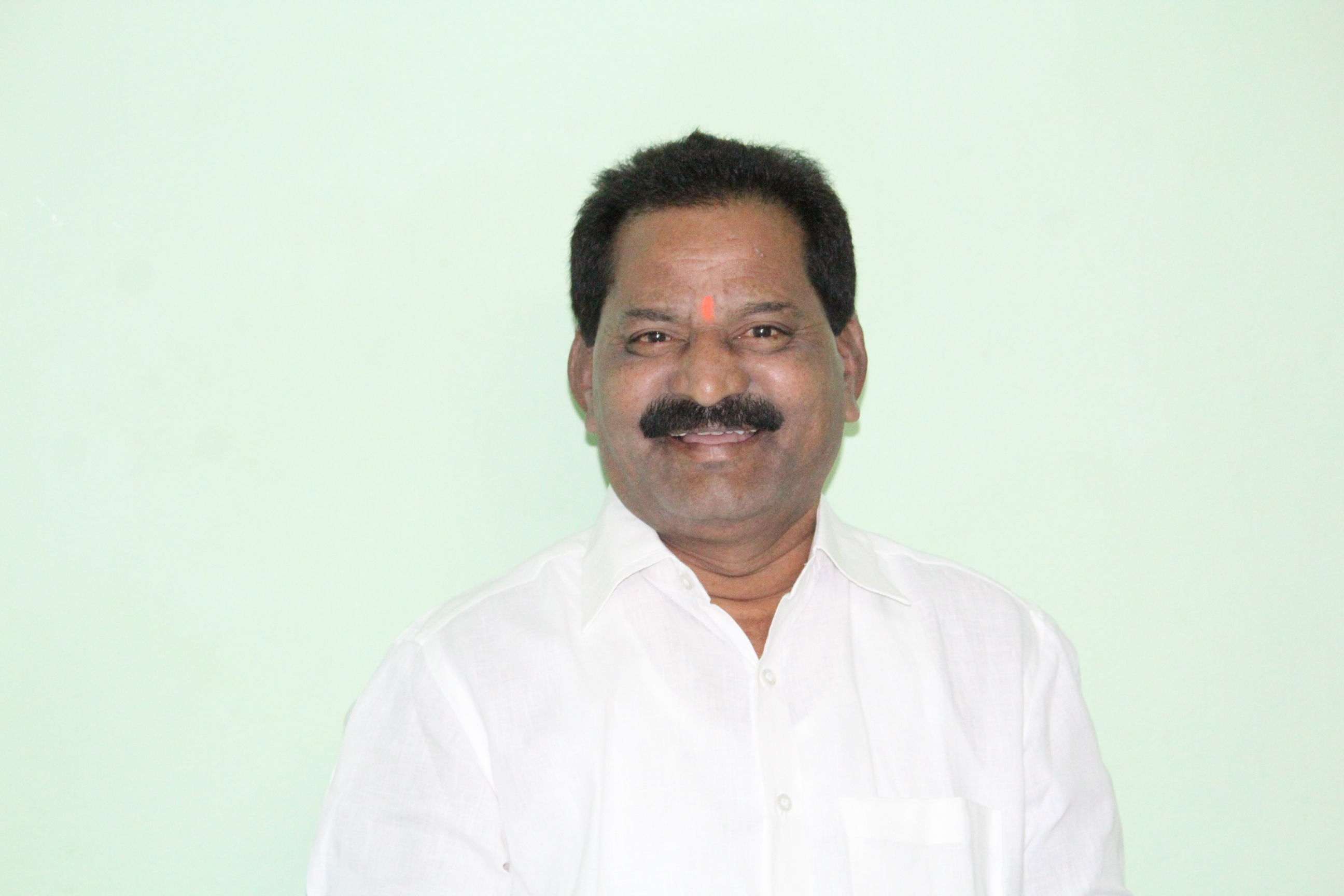

Member of Legislative Assembly Yellandu, Telangana
- Incumbent
- Assumed office 2023–present

Member of Telangana Legislative Assembly
- In office 2014–2018
- Preceded by: Vooke Abbaiah
- Succeeded by: Banoth Haripriya
- Constituency: Yellandu

Personal details
- Party: Indian National Congress (2023 - present)
- Other political affiliations: Bharat Rashtra Samithi

Koram Kanakaiah (11 March 1962) is a politician from Telangana. He served as an MLA from the Yellandu Assembly Constituency in the 2014 State Assembly Elections for the Indian National Congress. He is a two time MLA.

== Early life ==
Kanakaiah is from Koyagudem. He is born to Pullaiah. He dropped out of school after Class V.

== Career ==
Kanakaiah won 2023 Legislative Assembly Elections as MLA from Yellandu, Telangana State.
