= Singareni Ghani Karmika Sangham =

The Singareni Ghani Karmika Sangham is a trade union of workers in the Singareni coal fields in Andhra Pradesh, India. Politically, it is aligned with the UCCRI(ML) faction of D.V. Rao. In 1998, it polled 414 votes in the union representative election. By 2001 its support had decreased to 310 votes.
