= All India Construction Workers Federation =

Trade union in India

- Abbreviation: AICWF
- Legal status: Active
- Region served: India
- National President: Bala Subramanian
- General secretary: SK Sharma
- Affiliations: AICCTU

All India Construction Workers Federation is the largest organizations for construction workers of India. AICWF has organized a third successful National Conference. It has a presence in 18 Indian states and is expanding in the remaining ones. It is politically affiliated with CPIML Liberation.

== National affiliations ==
AICWF is affiliated with the AICCTU. It occasionally publishes materials to raise the consciousness of the working masses of India.

== National Conference ==
The 3rd national conference of AICWF concluded in Ranchi on 29–30 September with a call of struggle for 'Higher Wages and Regular Work.'

The conference, attended by representatives from 16 states, concluded with the election of a 47-member National Executive with a 15-members office bearers team. Comrade Balasubramanian from Pondicherry was elected as National President and Comrade SK Sharma from Bihar as General Secretary. The conference gave a call of struggle for equal benefit in all states, guarantee of registration of every construction worker in the welfare boards in states, and common rules and regulations in all states. The conference also resolved for strengthening organisational structures at local, district and state levels.

== Organisation ==
• National President : Bala Subramaniam

• General Secretary : Sk Sharma
