= United Trade Union Congress (Bolshevik) =

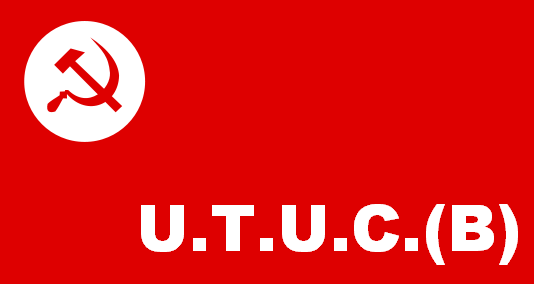
UTUC(B) flag

United Trade Union Congress (Bolshevik) is a federation of trade unions in Kerala, India. UTUC(B) emerged from a split in the United Trade Union Congress. UTUC(B) is politically tied to Revolutionary Socialist Party (Bolshevik). Initially, K.C. Vamadevan was president of UTUC(B) and T.M. Prabha was the general secretary of UTUC(B).

UTUC(B) was affected by the 2005 split in RSP(B). UTUC(B) had won the trade union elections at the Kerala Minerals and Metals Ltd, but within the KMML union divisions between followers of Babu Divakaran and Shibu Baby John emerged in March 2005. The majority of UTUC(B) trade unionists at KMML sided with Divakaran. On 11 November 2005, clashes erupted at a UTUC(B) conference in Chavara. A section of UTUC(B) sided with Babu Divakaran's breakaway-group, Revolutionary Socialist Party (Marxist). UTUC(B) president, K.C. Vamadevan, and general secretary, T.M. Prabha, joined RSP(M). RSP(M) formed a rival United Trade Union Congress (Marxist).
