= Telangana Boggu Ghani Karmika Sangham =

Trade union in India

T.B.G.K.S.
- Telangana Boggu Ghani Karmika Sangham
- Merged into: Brs
- Headquarters: Godavarikhani
- Location: India
- Members: Miryala Raji Reddy (president); Medipalli Sampath (vice president)

Telangana Boggu Ghani Karmika Sangham, a trade union of coal mine workers in the Singareni in the Indian state of Telangana. TBGKS is politically close to the party Bharat Rashtra Samithi Kalvakuntla Kavitha is Hon’ble President of Union. Kengerla Mallaiah was appointed working president of the union in March 2022.
