= United Trade Union Congress (Marxist) =

United Trade Union Congress (Marxist) was a federation of trade unions in Kerala, India. UTUC(M) emerged from a 2005 split in the United Trade Union Congress (Bolshevik). UTUC(M) is politically tied to Revolutionary Socialist Party (Marxist). T.M. Prabha is the general secretary of UTUC(M).
