= All India Bank Officers' Association =

Bank trade union in India

AIBOA
- All India Bank Officers' Association
- Founded: 14 February 1981 (45 years ago)
- Headquarters: No.109/10, Angappa Naicken Street, Second Floor, Chennai 600001, India
- Location: India
- Key people: Nagarajan.S(General Secretary) A.N.Suresh(President)
- Affiliations: Non Political Independent Organisation
- Website: www.aiboa.org

All India Bank Officers' Association is a national trade union centre of bank officers in India. It was founded on 14 February 1981 in Nagpur.

== See also ==
- All India Bank Employees Association
