= Andhra Pradesh Federation of Trade Unions =

Trade union in India

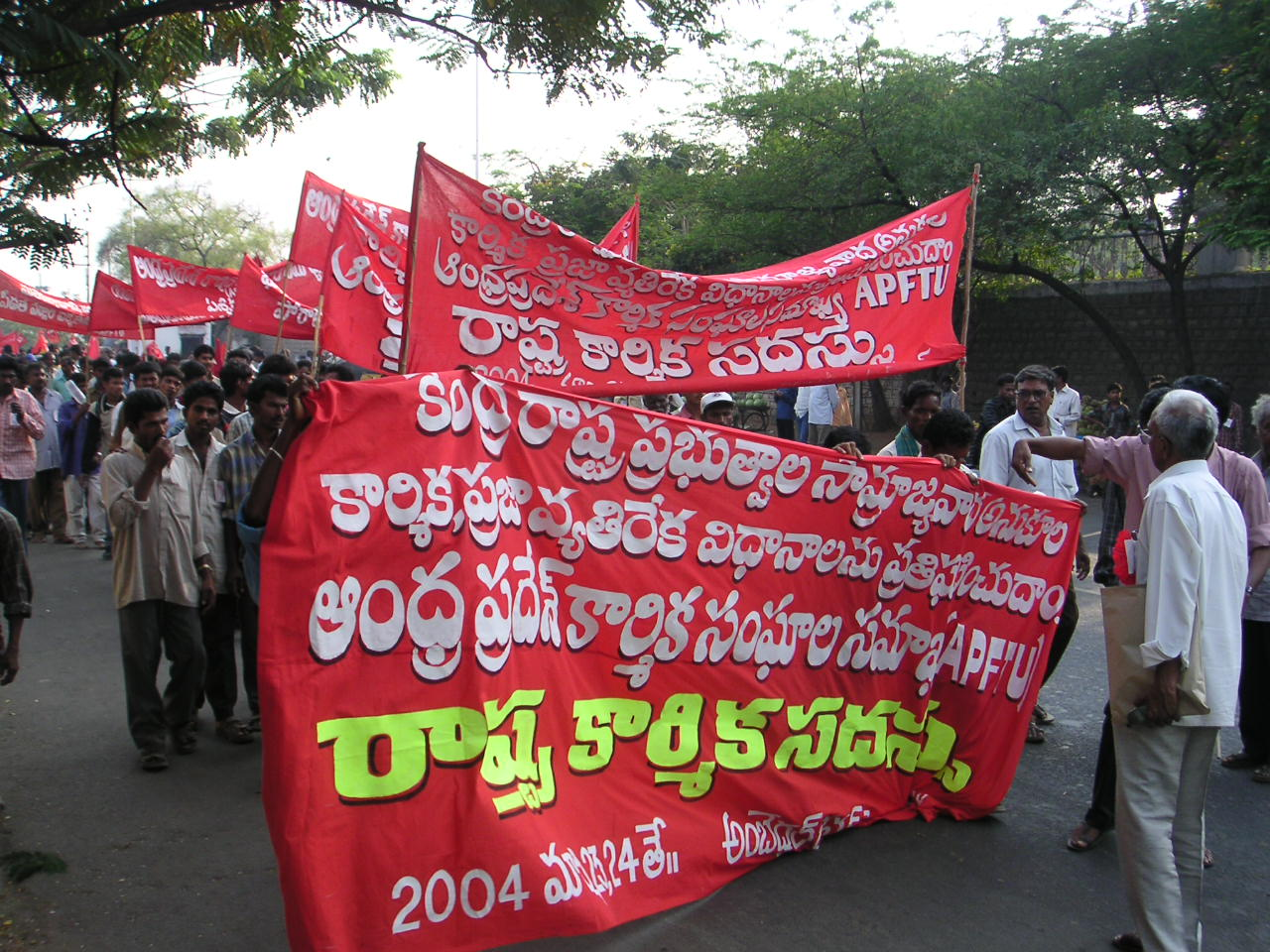
APFTU rally in Hyderabad

Andhra Pradesh Federation of Trade Unions (in Telugu: ఆంధ్ర ప్రదెౕశ్ కార్మిక సంఘాల సమాఖ్య), trade union organization in the Indian state of Andhra Pradesh, related to Communist Party of India (Marxist–Leninist). The organization held its first conference on 23–24 March 2004 in Hyderabad. APFTU publishes Kaarmika Shakthi (Workers' Power).
