= All India Bank Employees Association =

Bank trade union

AIBEA
- All India Bank Employees Association
- Founded: 20 April 1946 (80 years ago)
- Headquarters: "Prabhat Nivas" Regn. No.2037 Singapore Plaza, 164, Linghi Chetty Street, Chennai 600001, India
- Location: India
- Key people: •Rajen Nagar (President) •C. H. Venkatachalam (General Secretary)
- Affiliations: Independent
- Website: aibea.in

All India Bank Employees Association (AIBEA) is the oldest and largest national trade union of bank employees in India, was founded in 1946 on 20 April in Kolkata.

== Nationalisation of Banks in India ==
AIBEA demanded the nationalisation of Indian banks from as early as 1964 and 14 banks were nationalised in 1969 by Indira Gandhi's government. Another six banks were nationalised in 1980.

1990s onward, the Government of India started implementing a policy of liberalisation and started licensing private banks. Tarakeshwar Chakravarti, then general secretary of AIBEA, opposed the privatisation of banks.

== See also ==
- All India Bank Officers' Association
