= All West Bengal Tea Garden Labourers Union =

- Founded: 1989
- Headquarters: Hatighisa, West Bengal
- Location: India
- Key people: Kanu Sanyal, working president

The All West Bengal Tea Garden Labourers Union (abbreviated AWBTGLU) is a trade union of tea plantation workers in northern West Bengal, India. It was founded in 1989. Politically, the union is aligned with the Communist Party of India (Marxist-Leninist). The veteran Naxalite leader Kanu Sanyal (founder of the original CPI (ML) in 1969, leader of the Communist Organisation of India (Marxist-Leninist) until its merger into the refounded CPI (ML) in 2003) served as the working president of AWBTGLU prior to his death in 2010. The union was based in Sanyal's home village Hatighisa, near Naxalbari.

Under Sanyal's leadership, the union fiercely criticized the plantation labour policies of the then Left Front government of West Bengal. In 2002, Sanyal argued that lock-outs at north Bengal tea plantations had caused the death through hunger and diseases of 600 labourers. He charged the state government with indifference to the plight of tea labourers, labelling it a 'silent spectator'.

Following Sanyal's death, leaders of AWBTGLU include Ram Ganesh and Pradip Debnath. In 2011 AWBTGLU joined the Pashchim Banga Cha Sramik Karmachari Union, the Darjeeling Terai Dooars Chia Kaman Union and the Terai Sangrami Cha Sramik Union to launch a joint campaign, for implementation of a daily minimum wage of ₹245 for labourers at tea plantations (in order to comply with the norms of the 15th International Labour Conference and subsequent orders of the Supreme Court of India). Moreover, the four union resolved to campaign for the implementation of the Plantation Labour Act, and in case of sick and closed plantations demand the implementation of the 2010 Supreme Court directive.
