= Tekulapalli =

Coordinates: 17°43′12″N 80°20′39″E

- Interactive map of Tekulapalli
- Country: India
- State: Telangana
- District: Bhadradri Kothagudem

Languages
- Time zone: UTC+5:30 (IST)
- Climate: hot (Köppen)

Tekulapalle, Tekulapalli or Tekulapally is a Mandal in Bhadradri Kothagudem district of Telangana state, India.

== Demographics ==
According to Indian census, 2001, the demographic details of Tekulapalle mandal is as follows:

- Total Population: 43,961 in 9,685 Households.
- Male Population: 22,186 and Female Population: 21,775
- Children Under 6-years of age: 7,851 (Boys - 3,956 and Girls - 3,895)
- Total Literates: 14,527

== Villages ==
The villages in Tekulapally mandal includes: Bethampudi, Golya thanda, Thommido mile, sulanagar, Boddu Thanda, shanthi nagar, gollagudem, Bodu, Gangaram, Gollapalle, Koppurai, Koyagudem, Pegallapadu, Sambunigudem, Sulanagar, Tekulapalli and Thadikalapudi in Koyagudem panchaithi thandas jethyathanda, Kothathanda, Chukalabodu, Hanumathanda, Samyathanda, Danthalthada, Madrasthanda, Babojithanda, Rauoolpadu, Chintham chelaka, Mangal thanda, Tejavath thanda in Tekulapalli, Dasuthanda
