= All India Central Council of Trade Unions =

Trade union in India

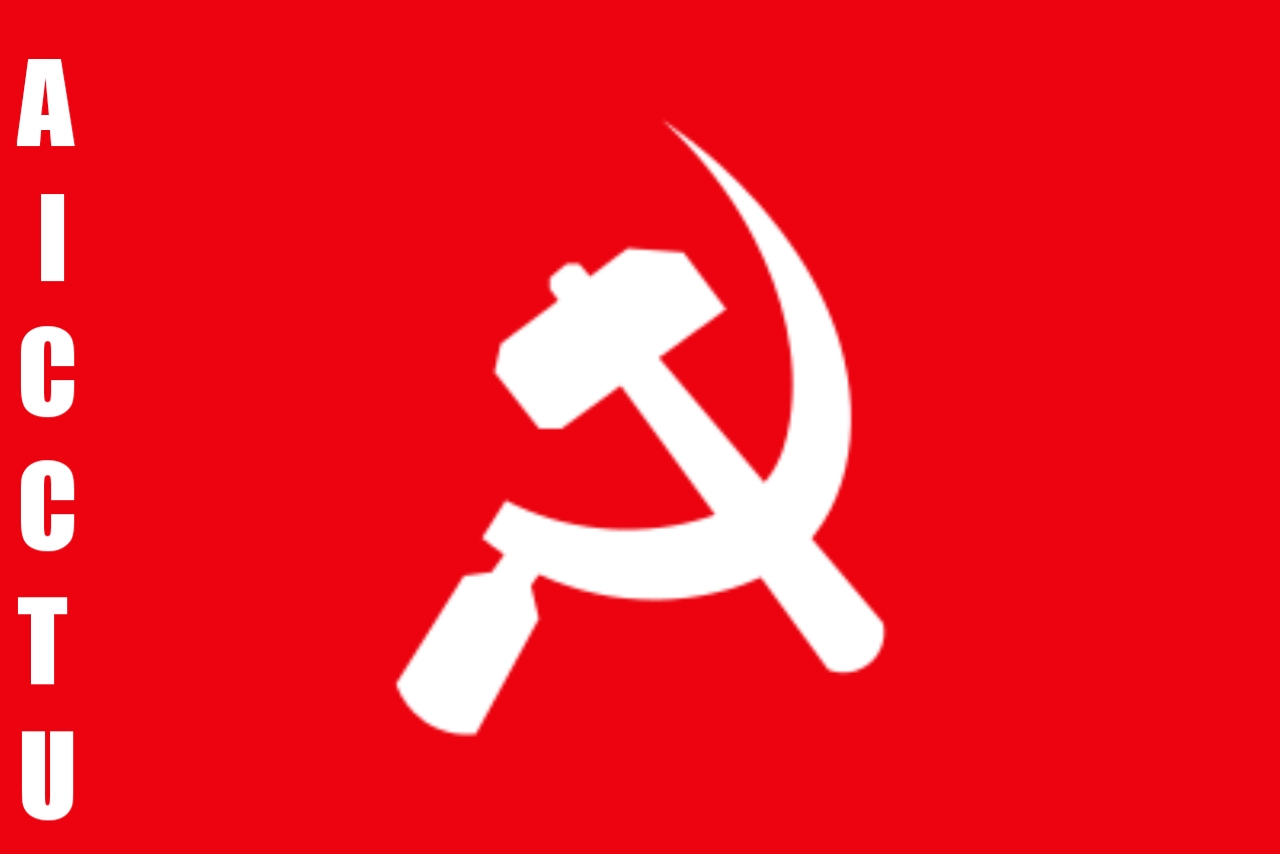
- Founded: August 4, 1989; 37 years ago
- Type: Trade union
- Location: India
- Members: 639,962 (2002)
- Key people: V. Shankar: President, Rajiv Dimri: General Secretary
- Website: www.aicctu.org/

All India Central Council of Trade Unions (AICCTU) is a central trade union federation in India. It is politically attached to Communist Party of India (Marxist–Leninist) Liberation. According to provisional statistics from the Ministry of Labour, AICCTU had a membership of 639,962 in 2002.

AICCTU is affiliated to the World Federation of Trade Unions.

== Federations affiliated to AICCTU ==
- All India Construction Workers Federation
- All India Contract Workers Federation
- Indian Railways Employees Federation

== See also ==
- Indian Trade Unions
