= Singareni =

Coordinates: 17°30′N 80°16′E

Singareni Yellandu
- village
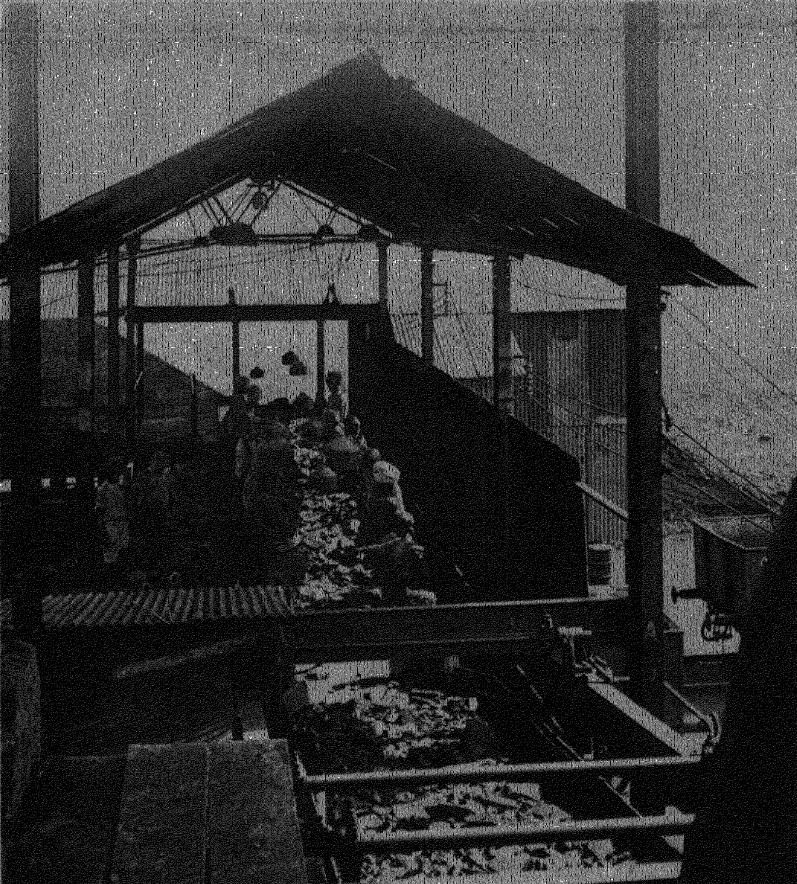
- Singareni Coal Mine in 1928.
- Nickname: SccL
- Interactive map of Singareni
- Country: India
- State: Telangana
- District: Bhadradri Kothagudem district
- Founder: Dr. William king

Languages
  - Official: Telugu
- Time zone: UTC+5:30 (IST)
- PIN: 507122
- Vehicle registration: TS
- Nearest city: Khammam

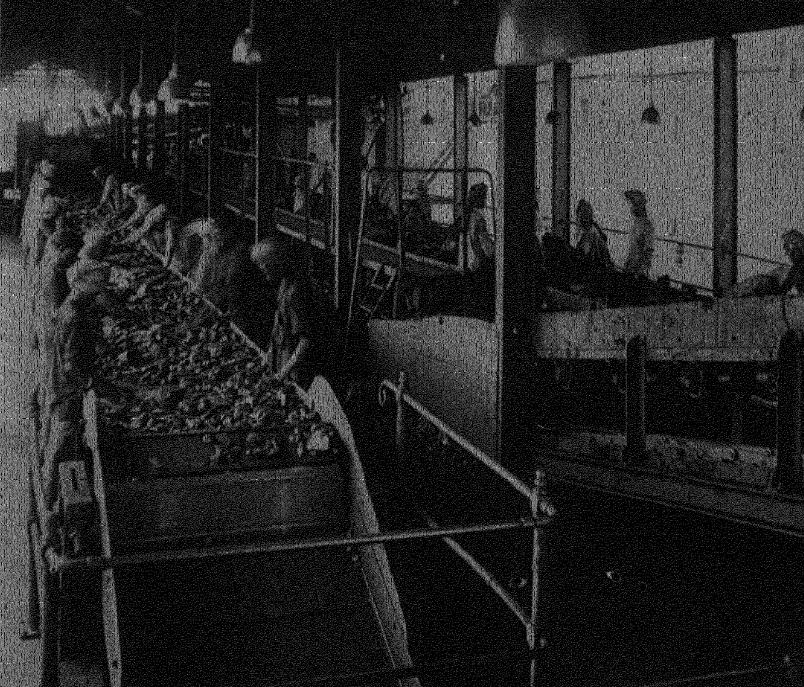
Singareni Coal Picking Belt, Photo 1928.

Singareni is a village located in Khammam district, Telangana, India. Coal reserves in Telangana were found first in Singareni. There is a railway line from Singareni that meets the Manuguru-Dornakal railway at Karepalli junction.

== Transport ==
Singareni railway station was also called Yellandu station, and is one of the oldest railway stations in Telangana.

== Singareni Colleries ==
Colleries means a coal mine and all the infrastructure that is part of it, and Singareni Colleries refers to the collieries located at Singareni. The Singareni Collieries Company was named after it. However after Hyderabad state was merged into India, the name of the town was changed to Yellandu and the Singareni Colleries railway station was neglected.
