= All India Federation of Trade Unions =

Trade union in India

AIFTU Symbol

All India Federation of Trade Unions, a central trade union federation in India. AIFTU was launched in 1992, as the trade union wing of Communist Party of India (Marxist-Leninist) Janashakti. Following the breakdown of CPI (ML) Janashakti into various splinter groups and the withdrawal of many of them from open mass work, AIFTU declined. An attempt to reorganization was made, and the federation has been reconstructed under the leadership of the president P. K. Murthy and general secretary Burgula Pradeep, who had been elected by the 1992 founding conference. This AIFTU is today not affiliated with any specific political party. There are also some minor splinter groups using the name.

In Telugu the AIFTU is known as అఖిల భరత కార్మిక సంఘాల సమాఖ్య (Akhila Bharata Karmika Sanghala Samakya).

AIFTU protested against Central government's plan to raise working hours from 8 to 12.

== See also ==
- Indian Trade Unions
