= Telugu Nadu Trade Union Council =

Trade union in India

- తెలుగు నాడు వాణిజ్య ఐక్యత మండలి
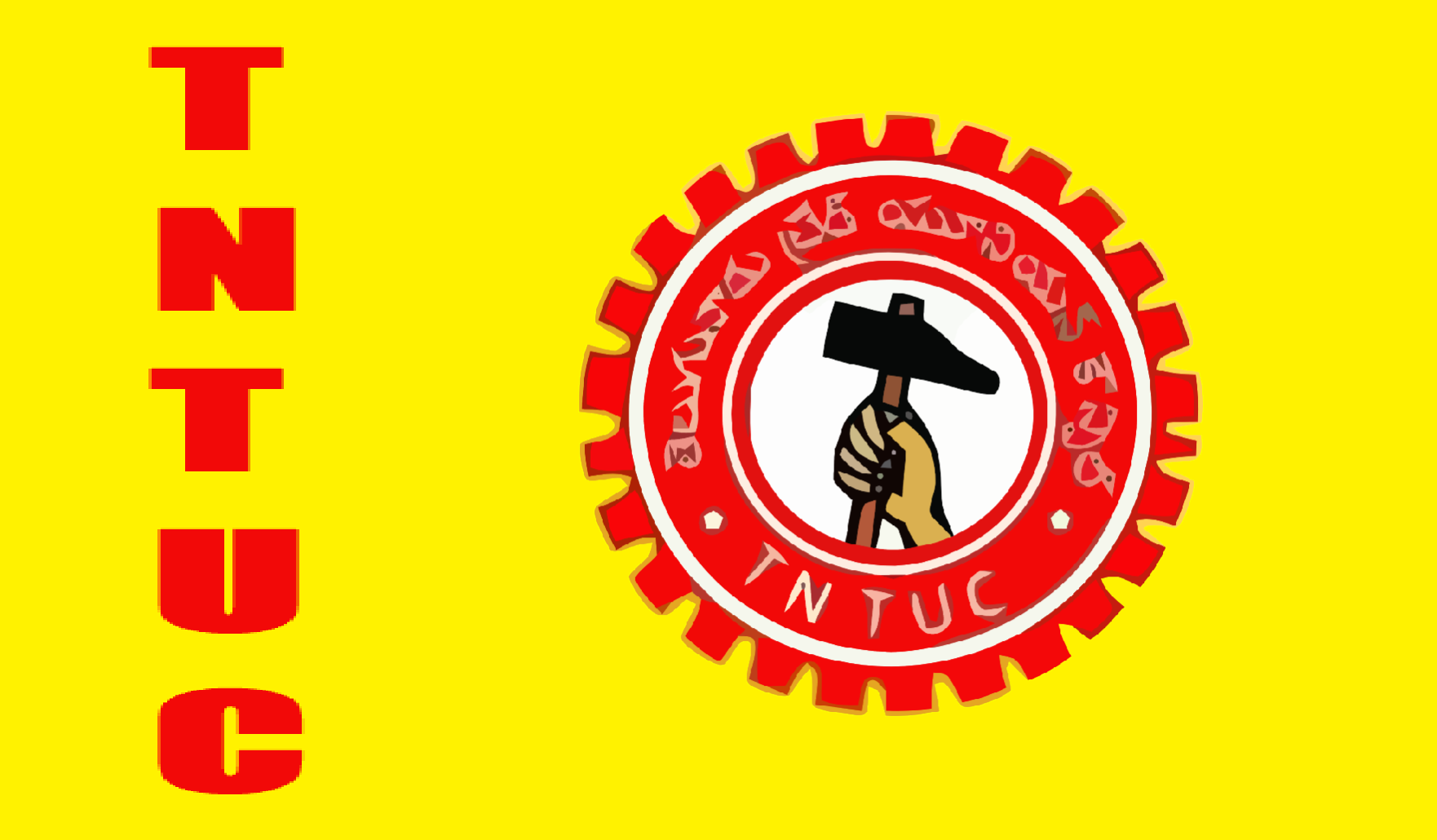
- Location(s): Andhra and Telangana

Telugu Nadu Trade Union Council (TNTUC) is the trade union wing of the Telugu Desam Party.
