= Communist Party of India (Marxist–Leninist) New Democracy =

- Abbreviation: CPIML ND
- General Secretary: Yatendra Kumar
- Founded: 1988
- Split from: Communist Party of India (Marxist-Leninist) (Chandra Pulla Reddy)
- Headquarters: 1797 IInd Floor, Parsadi Gali, Giani Bazar, Kotla Mubarakpur, New Delhi-110003
- Newspaper: New Democracy
- Student wing: Progressive Democratic Students Union
- Women's wing: Pragatisheel Mahila Sangathan
- Peasants wing: All India Kisan Maha Sabha
- Labour wing: Indian Federation of Trade Unions; All India Kisan Mazdoor Sabha
- Ideology: Communism; Naxalism; Mao Zedong Thought
- Political position: Far-left
- International affiliation: ICMLPO (formerly)
- Colors: Red
- Slogan: One Way Naxalbari....

Website
- cpimlnd.org

The Communist Party of India (Marxist–Leninist) New Democracy is a communist political party in India. The party was founded following a split from the Communist Party of India (Marxist–Leninist) (Chandra Pulla Reddy) in 1988. The general secretary of this party is Yatendra Kumar.

The party is mainly based in Telangana and Andhra Pradesh, but also has branches in Bihar, West Bengal, Punjab, Uttar Pradesh, Maharashtra, Delhi, Odisha, Haryana, etc.

The party had one member in the Andhra Pradesh Legislative Assembly, Gummadi Narsaiah who represented Yellandu Assembly constituency for five terms. The party also had one MLA from Bihar, whose name is Umadhar Prasad Singh.

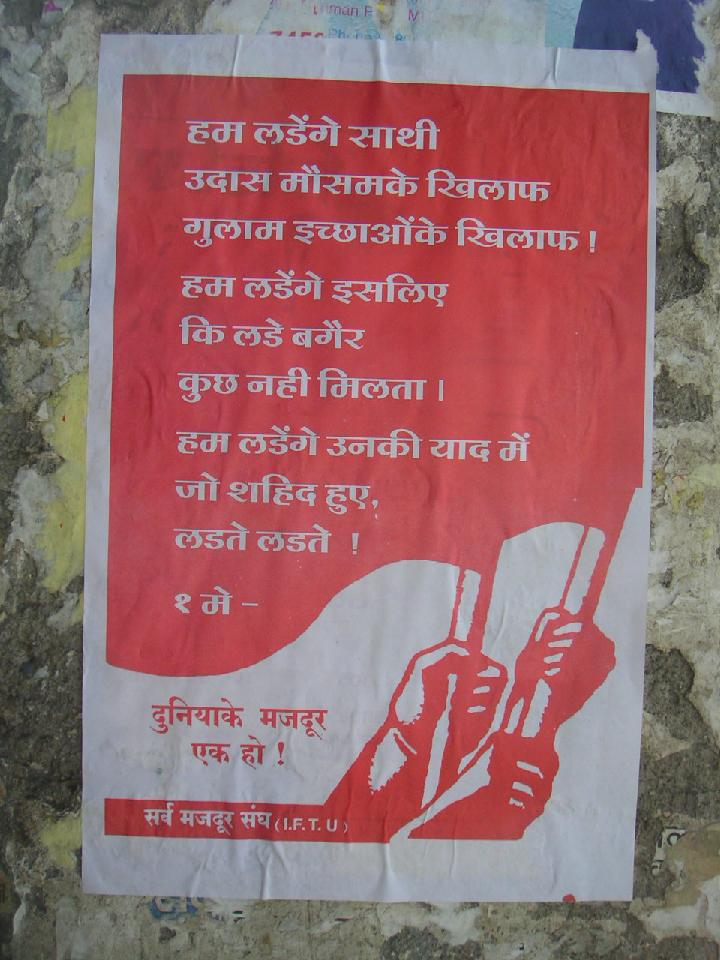
IFTU May Day poster

CPI (ML) ND has been following both parliamentary and non-parliamentary methods of class struggle. It participates in elections unlike the Communist Party of India (Maoist). The party has open mass organizations like the Indian Federation of Trade Unions (IFTU) for industrial workers and the All India Kisan-Mazdoor Sabha for farmers and agricultural workers.

== See also ==
- List of Naxalite and Maoist groups in India
