= Yellandu =

Town in Telangana, India

Yellandu Singareni, Bogguta
- Town
- Location within Telangana Location within India
- Coordinates: 17°35′40″N 80°19′8″E
- Country: India
- State: Telangana
- District: Bhadhradhri

Area
  - Total: 10.90 km^{2} (4.21 sq mi)
- Elevation: 205 m (673 ft)

Population (2023)
  - Total: 95,394
  - Density: 8,752/km^{2} (22,670/sq mi)

Languages
  - Official: Telugu
- Time zone: UTC+5:30 (IST)
- PIN: 507123, 507124
- Vehicle registration: TS 04, (Old)AP 20, TG 28
- Website: telangana.gov.in

Yellandu is a town in Bhadradri Kothagudem district of the Indian state of Telangana. It is located in Yellandu mandal of Kothagudem revenue division.

== Geography ==
Yellandu has an average elevation of 205 m (673 ft). A coal seam and open pits run through the town.

== Demographics ==
As of 2011 census of India, Yellandu municipality had a population of 33,732. While, its urban agglomeration had a population of 35,056, of which males are 17,016 and females are 18,040. The population under 6 years of age are 3,184. There are a total of 25,192 literates.

== Government and politics ==
Civic administration

Yellandu Municipality was constituted in 1986 and is classified as a third grade municipality with 24 election wards. The jurisdiction of the civic body is spread over an area of 10.09 km^{2} (3.90 mi^{2}). Rompaid and Sudimalla are the partial outgrowths to the town as per 2011 census.

Politics

Yellandu is a part of Yellandu (ST) (Assembly constituency) for Telangana Legislative Assembly. Koram Kanakaiha is the present MLA of the constituency from Indian National Congress. It is also a part of Mahabubabad (Lok Sabha constituency).

== Economy ==
Coal mining

Yellandu is the original home of the Singareni Collieries Company Limited, a coal mining company.
