= Communist Party of India (disambiguation) =

The Communist Party of India is a political party in India, and is the first communist party in the country.

Communist Party of India may also refer to parties that split from it or were established later:

- Communist Party of India (Marxist), national political party in India, the most prominent communist party in the country
  - Communist Party of India (Marxist), Kerala, its wing in the state of Kerala
  - Communist Party of India (Marxist), Tripura, its wing in the state of Tripura
  - Communist Party of India (Marxist), West Bengal, its wing in the state of West Bengal
- Communist Party of India (Marxist–Leninist), defunct political party in India, which split into factions
  - Communist Party of India (Marxist–Leninist) Bolshevik
  - Communist Party of India (Marxist–Leninist) Central Team
  - Communist Party of India (Marxist–Leninist) Class Struggle
  - Communist Party of India (Marxist–Leninist) Janashakti
  - Communist Party of India (Marxist–Leninist) Liberation, the best known of the factions, simply known as CPI (ML)
  - Communist Party of India (Marxist–Leninist) (Mahadev Mukherjee)
  - Communist Party of India (Marxist–Leninist) MUC (Maoist Unity Centre)
  - Communist Party of India (Marxist–Leninist) Naxalbari
  - Communist Party of India (Marxist–Leninist) New Democracy
  - Communist Party of India (Marxist–Leninist) New Initiative
  - Communist Party of India (Marxist–Leninist) People's War
  - Communist Party of India (Marxist–Leninist) Red Flag
    - Communist Party of India (Marxist-Leninist) Red Flag (Unnichekkan), now Marxist-Leninist Party of India (Red Flag)
  - Communist Party of India (Marxist–Leninist) Red Star
  - Communist Party of India (Marxist–Leninist) Second Central Committee
  - Communist Party of India (Marxist–Leninist) Unity Initiative
  - Communist Party of Indian Union (Marxist–Leninist)
  - Central Organising Committee, Communist Party of India (Marxist–Leninist)
  - Central Organising Committee, Communist Party of India (Marxist–Leninist) Party Unity
  - Central Organising Committee, Communist Party of India (Marxist–Leninist) Shantipal
  - Central Organising Committee, Communist Party of India (Marxist–Leninist) (Umadhar Singh)
  - Central Reorganisation Committee, Communist Party of India (Marxist–Leninist)
  - Provisional Central Committee, Communist Party of India (Marxist–Leninist)
  - Organising Committee, Communist Party of India (Marxist–Leninist)
  - Unity Centre of Communist Revolutionaries of India (Marxist–Leninist)
    - Unity Centre of Communist Revolutionaries of India (Marxist–Leninist) (Ajmer group)
    - Unity Centre of Communist Revolutionaries of India (Marxist–Leninist) (Anand)
    - Unity Centre of Communist Revolutionaries of India (Marxist–Leninist) (D.V. Rao)
    - Unity Centre of Communist Revolutionaries of India (Marxist–Leninist) (Harbhajan Sohi)
    - Unity Centre of Communist Revolutionaries of India (Marxist–Leninist) Subodh Mitra
- Communist Party of India (Maoist), militant group, leading the Naxalite–Maoist insurgency in India
- United Communist Party of India
- Marxist Communist Party of India
  - Marxist Communist Party of India (United)
- Revolutionary Communist Party of India
  - Revolutionary Communist Party of India (Das)
  - Revolutionary Communist Party of India (Tagore)
- Communist Ghadar Party of India

== See also ==
- CPI (ML) (disambiguation), abbreviation for various factions of Communist Party of India (Marxist–Leninist)
- Communist Party of Bharat
- Indian Communist Party
  - Indian Communist Party (1987)
- Communist Organisation of India (Marxist–Leninist)
- Maoist Communist Centre of India
- Revolutionary Communist Unity Centre (Marxist–Leninist)
- Andhra Pradesh Coordination Committee of Communist Revolutionaries
- Coordination Committee of Maoist Parties and Organisations of South Asia
- List of communist parties in India
