= List of Naxalite groups in India =

India has many Naxalite and Maoist groups, many of which descend from the Communist Party of India (Marxist–Leninist).

== List ==
- Communist Party of India (Marxist–Leninist) Red Star led by K. N. Ramachandran
- Centre of Indian Communists
- Communist Ghadar Party of India
- Communist Party of India (Maoist) led by Nambala Keshava Rao—result of the September 2004 merger of the Maoist Communist Centre of India (M.C.C.) and the Communist Party of India (Marxist–Leninist) People's War, also known as the People's War Group (PWG)
- Communist League of India (Marxist–Leninist)
- Communist Party of Bharat led by Ranjan Chakraborty and Barnali Mukherjee
- Communist Party of India (Marxist–Leninist) Naxalbari led by Rauf
- Communist Party of India (Marxist–Leninist) Janashakti led by Koora Rajanna
- Communist Party of India (Marxist–Leninist) Janashakti led by Ranadheer
- Communist Party of India (Marxist–Leninist) Janashakti led by Chandra Pulla Reddy
- Communist Party of India (Marxist–Leninist) Bhaijee
- Communist Party of India (Marxist–Leninist) Prajashakti
- Communist Party of India (Marxist–Leninist) Praja Pantha
- Communist Party of India (Marxist–Leninist) Vimochana
- Communist Party of India (Marxist–Leninist) Prathighatana
- Communist Party of India (Marxist–Leninist) Praja Pratighatana
- Communist Party of India (Marxist–Leninist) (Mahadev Mukherjee) led by Mahadev Mukherjee
- Communist Party of India (Marxist–Leninist) Central Team
- Communist Party of India (Marxist–Leninist) (Kanu Sanyal) led by Kanu Sanyal
- Communist Party of India (Marxist–Leninist) Liberation led by Dipankar Bhattacharya
- Communist Party of India (Marxist–Leninist) Red Flag led by P. C. Unnichekkan
- Communist Party of India (Marxist–Leninist) New Democracy led by Yatendra Kumar
- Communist Party of India (Marxist–Leninist) Somnath led by Somnath Chatterjee Ukhra and Pradip Banerjee
- Central Organising Committee, Communist Party of India (Marxist–Leninist) Shantipal
- Communist Party of India (Marxist–Leninist) Jan Samvad
- Communist Party of India (Marxist–Leninist) Nai Pahal
- Communist Party of India (Marxist–Leninist) New Proletarian
- Communist Party of India (Marxist–Leninist) Maharashtra
- Communist Party of India (Marxist–Leninist) Mass Line
- Organising Committee, Communist Party of India (Marxist–Leninist)
- Communist Party of United States of India
- Communist Revolutionary Centre
- Provisional Central Committee, Communist Party of India (Marxist–Leninist) led by Satyanarayan Singh and Santosh Rana
- Communist Party of India (Marxist–Leninist) Central Team
- Marxist–Leninist Committee led by K. Venkateswar Rao
- Re-organizing Committee, Communist League of India (Marxist–Leninist)
- Revolutionary Communist Centre of India (Marxist–Leninist–Maoist)
- Revolutionary Socialist Party of India (Marxist–Leninist)
- Revolutionary Communist Unity Centre (Marxist–Leninist)
- Lal Jhanda Dal
- Unity Centre of Communist Revolutionaries of India (Marxist–Leninist) (D.V. Rao)
- Unity Centre of Communist Revolutionaries of India (Marxist–Leninist) (Ajmer group)
- Maoist Communist Party of Manipur

== See also ==
- List of communist parties in India
