= CPI (ML) =

CPI(ML) or CPI-ML or CPIML may refer to:

== Political organizations ==
=== Political parties ===
- Communist Party of India (Marxist–Leninist) Liberation, the Indian political party, widely considered as the successor of the original Communist Party of India (Marxist–Leninist).
- Communist Party of India (Marxist–Leninist), 1969–1972, former Indian political party which split from the Communist Party of India (Marxist)
  - Communist Party of India (Marxist–Leninist) New Democracy, active remnant of the original Communist Party of India (Marxist–Leninist).
  - Communist Party of India (Marxist–Leninist) Class Struggle, active remnant of the original Communist Party of India (Marxist–Leninist).
  - Communist Party of India (Marxist–Leninist) Red Star, active remnant of the original Communist Party of India (Marxist–Leninist).
  - Communist Party of India (Marxist–Leninist) Janashakti, active remnant of the original Communist Party of India (Marxist–Leninist).
- Communist Party of Ireland (Marxist–Leninist), 1965–2003, former Irish political party.

=== Others ===
- Communist Party of India (Marxist-Leninist) Red Flag, former name of the Marxist-Leninist Party of India (Red Flag)

== See also ==
- Communist Party of India (disambiguation)
- Marxist–Leninist Communist Party (disambiguation)
- Communist Party of Indian Union (Marxist–Leninist)
