= Marxist–Leninist Communist Party =

The Marxist–Leninist Communist Party may refer to one of several organisations:

- Communist Party (Marxist–Leninist) (United States)
- Communist Party of Britain (Marxist–Leninist)
- Communist Party of Bolivia (Marxist–Leninist)
- Communist Party of Canada (Marxist–Leninist)
- Communist Party of Colombia (Marxist–Leninist)
- Communist Party of Denmark/Marxist–Leninists
- Communist Party of Germany/Marxists–Leninists
- Communist Party of Great Britain (Marxist–Leninist)
- Communist Party of Greece (Marxist–Leninist)
- Communist Party of Iceland (Marxist–Leninist)
- Communist Party of Ireland (Marxist–Leninist)
- Communist Party of India (Marxist–Leninist)
- Communist Party of India (Marxist–Leninist) Liberation
- Communist Party of India (Marxist–Leninist) People's War
- Communist Party of India (Marxist–Leninist) Red Star
- Communist Party of India (Marxist–Leninist) Second Central Committee
- Marxist-Leninist Party of India (Red Flag)
- Communist Party of Malaya/Marxist–Leninist
- Communist Party of Mexico (Marxist–Leninist)
- Communist Party of Nepal (Unified Marxist–Leninist)
- Communist Party of Peru (Marxist–Leninist)
- Communist Party of Spain (Marxist–Leninist)
- Communist Party of Turkey/Marxist–Leninist
- Communist Party USA (Marxist–Leninist)
- Marxist–Leninist Communist Party of Benin
- Marxist–Leninist Communist Party of Belgium
- Marxist–Leninist Communist Party of Ecuador
- Marxist–Leninist Communist Party of Greece
- Marxist–Leninist Communist Party (Turkey)
- Marxist–Leninist Communist Party of Venezuela
- Marxist–Leninist Italian Communist Party
- Marxist–Leninist Party of Germany
- Japan Communist Party (Marxist–Leninist)
- Revolutionary Communist Party of Britain (Marxist–Leninist)

== See also ==
- Marxist–Leninist Party (disambiguation)
- Communist party (disambiguation)
- List of communist parties
- CPI (ML) (disambiguation)
- Communist Party of Nepal (disambiguation)
