= Central Organising Committee, Communist Party of India (Marxist–Leninist) =

Communist party faction

- Leader: Sharma
- Founded: February 1974
- Split from: Communist Party of India (Marxist–Leninist) (Mahadev Mukherjee)
- Student wing: Radical Students Union in Andhra Pradesh
- Ideology: Marxism-Leninism
- Publication: Liberation

Central Organising Committee, Communist Party of India (Marxist–Leninist) (abbreviated COC, CPI(ML)) was a communist party in India, one of the main splinter factions of the original Communist Party of India (Marxist–Leninist). COC, CPI(ML) occupied a middle position between the pro-Charu Majumdar group led by Mahadev Mukherjee and the anti-Majumdar group led by Satyanarayan Singh. Failing to articulate a common ideological position, COC, CPI(ML) soon suffered internal divisions and splits. Two of the splinter groups of COC, CPI(ML) in Andhra Pradesh are predecessors of the present-day Communist Party of India (Maoist).

== Split between Mukherjee and Sharma, emergence of COC, CPI(ML) ==
The emergence of COC, CPI(ML) began in 1973 as the erstwhile secretary of the Punjab branch and Central Committee member of the original CPI(ML), Jagjit Singh Sohal ("Sharma"), began to distance himself from the line of the late CPI(ML) general secretary Charu Majumdar. Sharma had emerged as the secretary of the pro-Majumdar faction of CPI(ML) but soon developed differences with the other main leader of the faction, Mahadev Mukherjee. Sharma began to distance himself from Majumdar's line of annihilation of class enemies and the original CPI(ML) slogan 'China's chairman is our Chairman'. Mukherjee declared Sharma expelled from the party. In October 1973 Sharma formed a new Central Committee consisting of himself, Suniti Kumar Ghosh, Sham Chopra and Ram Nath. The Sharma-led group constituted COC, CPI(ML) as a separate party in February 1974, after having established contacts with a number of state committees. COC, CPI(ML) gathered Sharma's group in Punjab, the Andhra Pradesh Committee, Suniti Kumar Ghosh from West Bengal and some party cadres from Uttar Pradesh. COC, CPI(ML) published an organ called Liberation. COC, CPI(ML) sought to unite all groups that had been part of CPI(ML) by the time Majumdar had died in 1972, reaffirming that Majumdar's party was the sole true CPI(ML) (thereby rejecting Satyanaryan Singh's break-away CPI(ML)).

== In Andhra Pradesh ==
The strongest group that had joined COC, CPI(ML) was the Andhra committee under the leadership of Kondapalli Seetharamaiah. As of 1974 the Andhra committee was based in Nagpur. The Andhra committee had five active armed squads and a number of district-level party committees. The squads continued to carry out annihilation actions.

Whilst the squads of the original CPI(ML) had been virtually dismantled by January 1974, COC, CPI(ML) reorganised squad actions 1974–1976. COC, CPI(ML) squad activities were largely limited to Telangana. In Medak district a squad led by Kotagiri Venkati was particularly active, conducting nearly 30 robberies in 1974 and a similar number in 1975. The squad disintegrated after the killing of Venkati on 25 June 1976, in Mupparam, Warangal district.

In some parts of Andhra Pradesh COC, CPI(ML) mobilised agitations against landlords and moneylenders. COC, CPI(ML) sought to mobilise the Adivasi population in Godavari forest, although this effort was unsuccessful as no organisation was built amongst the local population. In Dharmavaram taluq, Anantapur district COC, CPI(ML) organised peasants and seized some 1,000 acres. The Dharmavaram struggle came to an abrupt end when the leader of the movement, Sriramulu, and a number of peasants were killed by landlords. COC, CPI(ML) claimed a role in industrial strikes in Nizamabad Cement Factory, Usha Engineering and other locations. COC, CPI(ML) organised agricultural workers' strikes in Hyderabad district (Ankusapuram area), Ongole district, Nellore district and Nalgonda district (Kandakura area), all ended with limited concessions from landlords. The Andhra committee also began organising some mass organisations such as the Radical Students Union and Radical Youth League.

COC, CPI(ML) managed to obtain support from intellectuals, writers and poets, organised in the Revolutionary Writers Association (RWA). Sri Sri served as the RWA president. RWA members toured Andhra Pradesh and organised mass meetings, accompanied by musical teams from Jana Natya Mandali.

== Other states ==
Another group that joined COC, CPI(ML) was the Mass Line group in Kerala. In Kashmir the group of R.P. Saraf agreed to join COC, CPI(ML) but rejected the notion of a centralised party at this stage. Rather Saraf demanded that COC, CPI(ML) would solely function as a coordination body for the time being. Likewise the Uttar Pradesh committee asked that COC, CPI(ML) should be open to all Maoists. Thus COC, CPI(ML) did not agree with the suggestions from Saraf and the UP committee, and these two groups opted not to join the party.

== Failed attempt at united front ==
In 1975, in response to the Emergency COC, CPI(ML) participated in a meeting organised by Satyanarayan Singh's CPI(ML). The Unity Committee and UCCRI(ML) also participated. The meeting issued a declaration calling for the formation of an 'anti-fascist united front'. However, the united front never materialised as COC, CPI(ML) and UCCRI(ML) denounced the declaration. Soon thereafter COC, CPI(ML) started to disintegrate.

== 'Road to Revolution' and splits in COC, CPI(ML) ==
COC, CPI(ML) suffered a protracted organisational crisis from the onset of the founding of the party. It failed to re-unite the communist revolutionary movement and formulate a common ideological line for the party. Rather, there were three separate documents issued by different groups, one by Sharma, one by Ghosh and one produced by the Andhra committee of the party. COC, CPI(ML) lacked a unifying theoretical analysis. Rather the members of the party leadership were united by rejection of the two other main lines of the Naxal movement at the time, i.e. those of Mahadev Mukherjee and Satyanarayan Singh. COC, CPI(ML) disagreed with continuation of Majumdar's line without any modifications (i.e. Mukherjee's position), but it could not digest the programme of Singh calling for economic struggles, mass organisations, united fronts, forest base areas and an outright rejection of the annihilation line.

In October 1975 the three documents were withdrawn and 'Road to Revolution' was adopted as a compromise measure. 'Road to Revolution' argued that the principal contradiction in Indian context stood between feudalism and the broad masses of the people. It argued in favour of armed struggle, but stated that mass organisation struggles were also valid and that methods of struggle would be determined from local dynamics.

The 'Road to Revolution' failed to resolve the political crisis in COC, CPI(ML). The Andhra and Bihar committees of COC, CPI(ML) continued to adhere to the line of annihilation of class enemies. Nevertheless, M. Appalasuri, one of three members of the Andhra committee, called for participation in Lok Sabha elections. As of 1976 the Andhra committee broke away from COC, CPI(ML). Kondapalli Seetharamaiah would later merge his faction to create the Communist Party of India (Marxist-Leninist) People's War.

== Appeal for release of prisoners ==
After the 1977 Lok Sabha election, many political detainees arrested under the Emergency were released. Naxal prisoners, however, did not benefit from this move. On 9 April 1977, Suniti Kumar Ghosh of COC, CPI(ML), Satyanaranyan Singh of CC, CPI(ML), Khokan Majumder of Unity Committee, CPI(ML) and Apurba Roy of UCCRI(ML) signed a memorandum to Prime Minister Morarji Desai, calling for the unconditional release of 12 000 revolutionary prisoners and restoration of civil liberties. During the anti-Emergency struggle, the Janata Party had promised to release political prisoners. Once in power however, they had back-tracked on that promise.

== Further disintegration ==
In 1977 a faction led by Ram Nath, gathering the majorities in the Delhi, Bihar and Uttar Pradesh committees of COC, CPI(ML), broke away and formed the Communist League of India (Marxist-Leninist). Suniti Kumar Ghosh broke away from COC, CPI(ML) and continued to run a small faction also named COC, CPI(ML).

The secretary of the Punjab committee of COC, CPI(ML), Sham Chopra, broke away and joined the T. Nagi Reddy group. In 1979 what remained of Sharma's COC, CPI(ML) suffered yet another split, as some party leaders in Punjab rejected his support for Deng Xiaoping in China and the Three Worlds Theory.

In 1982 M. Appalasuri's COC, CPI(ML) faction merged with Bhowani Roy Chowdhury's West Bengal-based CPI(ML) Unity Organisation, forming the Communist Party of India (Marxist-Leninist) Party Unity.
