= N. V. Krishnaiah =

Indian politician

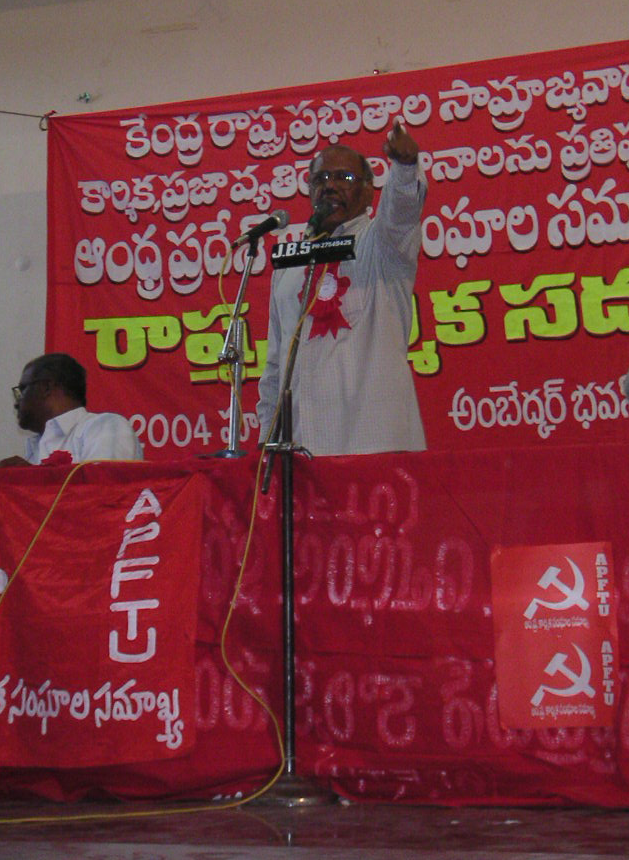
N.V. Krishnaiah at APFTU conference

N. V. Krishnaiah (also known as NVK) was a communist politician from Andhra Pradesh, India. He was a municipal councillor in Nellore, member of the Andhra Pradesh legislature, president of the Indian Federation of Trade Unions and a central leader in the Communist Party of India (Marxist-Leninist).

== Biography ==
NVK was born in 1930 in Yataluru village, Venkatagiri mandal, Nellore district. He completed high school in Venkatagiri and then moved to Nellore to join V.R. College. At V.R. College he joined the students movement and later became a member of the Communist Party in 1952.

He then returned to Venkatagiri and began to work in the peasant front of the party. In 1957 he shifted his activities to Nellore and became a trade union organizer amongst motor workers. In both cases he led militant campaigns and came into conflicts with landlords and private bus company owners.

When the Communist Party of India was divided, NVK sided with the leftist tendency. He became the secretary of the Nellore town committee and a member of the Nellore district committee of the new party, the Communist Party of India (Marxist). In 1964 he was elected to the Municipal Corporation of Nellore.

NVK contested the 1967 Andhra Pradesh Legislative Assembly election as a CPI(M) candidate in the Nellore constituency. He came second with 11951 votes (25.89%). He was defeated by the Jan Sangh candidate M. R. Annadata.

At the same time, the CPI(M) in Andhra Pradesh faced another split. Large sections of the regional party cadres began to condemn the CPI(M) leadership as 'neo-revisionist'. Led by T.N. Reddy, the radical elements rallied around the Andhra Pradesh Coordination Committee of Communist Revolutionaries. NVK joined the APCCCR, and as a consequence he later resigned from his position as a municipal councillor.

NVK was one of the accused in the Hyderabad Conspiracy Case. During the period of 1968-1978, he was frequently jailed, and spent over five years in imprisonment. When the APCCCR was divided in 1971, NVK sided with the Chandra Pulla Reddy-led faction. This grouping merged into the Communist Party of India (Marxist-Leninist)

After being released from jail in 1978, he became involved in trade union activities. He became the president of the Indian Federation of Trade Unions. In 1980 he sided with C.P. Reddy, who broke away and formed his own CPI(ML).

In the 1989 Andhra Pradesh Legislative Assembly election, NVK contested the Sircilla seat as an independent. He won with 26430 votes (29.84%). During his legislative tenure, he raised over 2500 questions in the assembly. One of the issues he highlighted was the need for irrigation in the Karimnagar area.

Following the 1994 Legislative Assembly election, CPI(ML) Janashakti was divided. NVK became the leader of a break-away group, the Communist Party of India (Marxist-Leninist) Janashakti COC. Later, CPI(ML) Janashakti COC would merge with the Communist Party of India (Marxist-Leninist) New Initiative of Arvind Sinha and form the Communist Party of India (Marxist-Leninist) Unity Initiative. CPI(ML) Unity Initiative then merged with the Communist Organisation of India (Marxist-Leninist) of Kanu Sanyal to form the Communist Party of India (Marxist-Leninist). In January 2005, the Communist Party of India (Marxist-Leninist) Red Flag merged into the CPI(ML) led by Sanyal, at a conference in Vijayawada. NVK became a Central Committee member of the unified CPI(ML).

NVK died on 13 September 2006.
