= List of communist parties in India =

This page contains a list of political parties in India that are aligned with communism.

The majority of communist parties in India trace their origin back to the Communist Party of India (abbr. CPI) which was founded in 1925. The Communist Party of India (Marxist) (abbr. CPI(M)), the sole communist party currently recognized as a national party was formed from a split in the ranks of the CPI in 1964 over disputed differences. The Communist Party of India (Marxist–Leninist) (abbr. CPI(ML)), split from the CPI(M) in 1969 before splintering into several Naxalite groups.

== Registered Communist parties ==
=== Communist parties with national party status ===
Election symbol	Name	Founded	Ideology	Leader	Seats in Lok Sabha	Seats in Rajya Sabha	Seats in State Assemblies	Seats in State Councils
CPIM election symbol	CPIM	7 November 1964 (61 years ago)	Marxism–Leninism	M. A. Baby	4 / 543	3 / 245	43 / 4,036	0 / 426

=== Communist parties with state party status ===
Election symbol	Name	Founded	Ideology	Leader	Recognised In	Seats in Lok Sabha	Seats in Rajya Sabha	Seats in State Assemblies	Seats in State Councils
CPIM election symbol	CPI	26 December 1925 (100 years ago)	Marxism–Leninism	D. Raja	Kerala, Tamil Nadu, Manipur	2 / 543	2 / 245	11 / 4,036	1 / 426
CPIML election symbol	CPI(ML)L	28 July 1974 (52 years ago)	Marxism–Leninism; Maoism	Dipankar Bhattacharya	Bihar	2 / 543	0 / 245	4 / 4,036	1 / 426
CPIM election symbol	RSP	19 March 1940 (86 years ago)	Marxism-Leninism	Manoj Bhattacharya	Kerala	1 / 543	0 / 245	3 / 4,036	0 / 426

=== Other parties ===
Party banner	Name	Founded	Ideology	Leader	Seats in Lok Sabha	Seats in Rajya Sabha	Seats in State Assemblies	Seats in State Councils
	CMP	1986	Marxism- Leninism	C P John	0 / 543	0 / 245	1 / 4,036	0 / 426
	RMPI	2016	Marxism–Leninism	Mangat Ram Pasla	0 / 543	0 / 245	1 / 4,036	0 / 426
	RCPI	1 August 1934 (92 years ago)	Anti-Stalinism	Mihir Bain	0 / 543	0 / 245	0 / 4,036	0 / 426
	RSP(L)	2016	Revolutionary socialism	Kovoor Kunjumon	0 / 543	0 / 245	0 / 4,036	0 / 426
	PWP	1948	Marxism-Leninism	Jayant Prabhakar Patil	0 / 543	0 / 245	1 / 4,036	0 / 426

== Naxal-Maoist parties ==
Name	Ideology	Leader
CPIML Red Star	Marxism–Leninism–Maoism	P. J James
CPIML Class Struggle		Viswam
CPIML New Democracy	Marxism–Leninism–Maoism	Yatendra Kumar
CPIML Mass Line	Marxism–Leninism–Maoism	Pradeep Singh

=== Naxal-Maoist parties engaged in armed struggle ===
Party banner	Name	Ideology	Leader
	CPI(Maoist)	Maoism, Communism	Thippiri Tirupathi

== Trotskyist communist parties ==
- New Socialist Alternative (India)
- Radical Socialist (India)
- Workers' Socialist Party (India)
- Revolutionary Communists (India)

== See also ==
- Left Front (India)
- Socialism in India
- Communism in India
- Communism in Kerala
- Naxalite
- List of political parties in India
- Politics of India
- List of Naxalite and Maoist groups in India
