= Katre =

Katre may refer to:

- Katre (Crete), a town of ancient Crete, Greece
- Lakshman Madhav Katre (1926-1985), Indian air force officer, head of the Indian Air Force from 1981 to 1985
- Sumitra Mangesh Katre (1906-1998), Indian lexicographer and linguist
- Madhukar Katre (1927-2009), Indian politician and trade unionist
