= Communist Party of India (Marxist–Leninist) Vimochana =

- General Secretary: K. Ramachandran
- Founded: 1984
- Split from: Communist Party of India (Marxist–Leninist) (Chandra Pulla Reddy)
- Merged into: Communist Party of India (Marxist–Leninist) Janashakti
- Newspaper: Vimochana
- Ideology: Communism; Marxism-Leninism; Mao Zedong Thought; Naxalism
- Political position: Far-left
- Colours: Red

Communist Party of India (Marxist-Leninist) Vimochana (Note: "Vimochana" means "Retribution" or (officially) "Resistance". Party officially used the English name Communist Party of India (Marxist-Leninist) Resistance.) (Telugu: కమ్యూనిస్టు పార్టీ ఆఫ్ ఇండియా (మార్క్సిస్ట్-లెనినిస్ట్) విమోచన; abbreviated as CPI(M–L)V, Telugu: సీపీఐ (ఎంఎల్‌) విమోచన), was a Marxist–Leninist Naxalite party in India, founded as a result of the split within the Communist Party of India (Marxist–Leninist) (Chandra Pulla Reddy) in 1984.

== History ==
Chandra Pulla Reddy's CPI (M-L) already had split within 1984 with Communist Party of India (Marxist-Leninist) Praja Pantha group being led by Paila Vasudeva Rao. Officially Paila V. Rao group had their CC Meeting in December 6-7, 1984, electing S. R. Bhaijee as General Secretary and supporting the committee of P. V. Rao; meanwhile the faction headed by K. Ramachandran assembling their CC Meeting and announcing (on December 13, 1984) K. Ramachandran being elected as General Secretary by a statement of CC member Baldev Singh. Nirmala Reddy ("Radhakka"), wife of the deceased Chandra Pulla Reddy also supported this group. Koora Rajanna was the State Secretary of the party.

In 1988 this group further split into two, with Communist Party of India (Marxist-Leninist) Prathighatana being founded. In 1989 elections independent but affiliated nominee N. V. Krishnaiah was elected to Andhra Pradesh Legislative Assembly from Sircilla.

In 1990 group started meetings with three other groups, which resulted with the foundation of Communist Party of India (Marxist–Leninist) Janashakti in 1992.

== See also ==
- List of Naxalite and Maoist groups in India
