= Narayan Sanyal (politician) =

Narayan Sanyal (died 17 April 2017) commonly known as Bijoy da and Naveen Prasad was a Maoist ideologue and a Politburo member of the Communist Party of India (Maoist). He was one of the earliest comrade of Naxal leader Charu Majumdar and member of undivided Communist Party of India (Marxist–Leninist). It is claimed that at the time of arrest Narayan Sanyal was next only to CPI (Maoist) the then general secretary Muppala Lakshmana Rao alias Ganapathy.

== Early life ==
Sanyal was born in Bogra District of Bangladesh. His father was a district leader of Indian National Congress. The family of sanyal shifted to India in 1940s. After completion of the education he joined in a service of United Bank of India in Kolkata. In 1960s he left the job and participated in Far-left politics.

== Political life ==
Sanyal was initially associated with the Man-Money-Gun group founded by Bengali revolutionary Ananta Singh, until the Naxalbari uprising erupted in 1967. In 1969, he went to Bihar and started working under Satyanarayan Singh, the then politburo member of CPI(ML). In 1971, Sanyal led pro-Majumdar unit of CPI(ML) in Bihar and organized members in the Jehanabad - Palamu belt. He was arrested in 1973 and was released in 1977 after the first Left Front government released political prisoners. In 1978, he along with others formed the group named CPI(ML) Party Unity. He became the general secretary of that group in 1987. This group was merged with CPI(ML)(People’s War) in 1998.

While Sanyal was working in Bastar region in Chhattisgarh, he facilitated the merger with unified Communist Party of India (Marxist–Leninist) People's War and Maoist Communist Centre of India (MCC) in 2004. He also became politburo member of Communist Party of India (Maoist). Sanyal was also active in Palamu region of Jharkhand.

== Death ==
Sanyal was arrested again in December 2005 from Raipur, Chhattisgarh but released from jail in 2014 due to ill health. At 78 he died in Kolkata on 17 April 2017 due to suffering from multiple ailments, including cancer.
