= CPB =

CPB may refer to:

== Companies ==
- Campbell's, an American producer of canned soups and related products (NASDAQ ticker CPB)
- Campbell Brothers, an Australian laboratory and manufacturing company
- Crispin Porter + Bogusky, an advertising agency
- Corporate Express (airline), a defunct Canadian airline
- Croatian Post's Bank, the literal meaning of Hrvatska poštanska banka

== Organizations ==
- Capitol Police Board, the body that governs the United States Capitol Police
- Centraal Planbureau, Dutch name for the Netherlands Bureau for Economic Policy Analysis
- Confederación Panamericana de Billar, the governing body of carom billiards in the Americas
- Corporation for Public Broadcasting, a publicly funded non-profit corporation in the United States
- Crown Property Bureau, a quasi-government agency in Thailand
- École nationale supérieure de chimie et de physique de Bordeaux, one of the French grandes écoles

== Political parties ==
- Communist Party of Bangladesh
- Communist Party of Belarus
- Communist Party of Belgium
- Communist Party of Bharat (India)
- Communist Party of Brazil
- Communist Party of Britain
- Communist Party of Bulgaria
- Communist Party of Burma
- Communist Party of Byelorussia

== Sports ==
- Chinese Professional Baseball

== Technology ==
- Cardiopulmonary bypass pump, also known as a "heart-lung machine"
- Charged particle beam of electrically charged particles
- Cycles per byte, a unit of execution cost of a computer algorithm
- Cyclic permutated binary, a type of digital code in computing
- Coded Picture Buffer, a buffer for encoded video frames used in video decoding
- A celiac plexus block is a nerve block used to treat chronic pain in the abdomen
- Continuous Power Bridge, typically used to power low wattage devices from a gang switched streetlight
- AMD Core Performance Boost Technology, aka AMD Turbo Core

== Other ==
- Cell Phone Bikini, 2016 album by Omar Rodríguez-López
- The Citizens Protection Bureau, a fictional police organization in the Total Recall 2070 television series
- Central Planning Board, term used in market socialism theory
- Canada Premium Bond, a type of Canada Savings Bond
- Crippled Black Phoenix, a British post-rock supergroup
- Certified Medical Biller, a certification from AAPC for healthcare supporting professionals
