= S. K. Limaye =

Indian politician and trade unionist (born 1909)

Shripad Krishna Limaye (born 8 December 1909, date of death unknown) was an Indian politician and trade unionist. Limaye served as a member of the Rajya Sabha (upper house of the Indian parliament) from Maharashtra in the 1960s.

== Communist Party cadre ==
Limaye was engaged in the struggle for Indian independence, becoming politically active in 1935. In that year he joined the Communist Party of India. He became the foremost leader of the party in Poona, where he recruited and trained many key cadres for the party. Limaye was seen as being close to S.A. Dange. However in 1942 he and his group of followers were expelled from the party. The rationale behind the expulsion was Limaye's opposition to support to the British war effort.

== Navajivan and Lal Nishan ==
At the time of the expulsion, Limaye's group counted around 200 men. In 1943 Limaye's group founded the Navjivan Sangathana ('New Life Organization'). In 1950 the organization, which was led by Limaye and Yashwant Chavan, discussed a possible merger with the Peasants and Workers Party of India (PWP). The then party leader of the PWP opposed the merger, as he thought that the entry of the Navjivan group would empower his rival Datta Deshmukh within the party. However, the merger went through and the Navjivan Sangathana members were admitted en bloc into the PWP.

The presence of the Limaye group in the PWP sharped the internal divisions inside the PWP. In the end the party was split, with the Limaye group joining the splinter group Kamgar Kisan Paksha. Soon that party was split as well, on the issue of its relations with the Communist Party. Limaye and Deshmukh did not go along with the merger of the party into the Communist Party, instead they regrouped as the Lal Nishan Gat ('Red Banner Group'). This group would later be known as the Lal Nishan Party. Limaye served as editor of the periodical Lal Nishan.

== Parliamentarian ==
Limaye was elected to the Rajya Sabha in April 1960. After being elected, he immediately joined the communist parliamentary group. In 1962, as the Sino-Indian war broke out, Limaye was arrested and put in preventive detention just before a parliamentary session.

== Personal life ==
Born in Sangli, S.K. Limaye was the son of Krishna Govind Limaye. He studied at Fergusson College in Poona. As of the 1960s, the resided in the Byculla neighbourhood of Bombay.

== Bibliography ==
- Limaye, S. K. An Inevitable Review of Certain Aspects of the Policies of the Indian Communist Leadership. [Poona, India]: Navajeevan Sanghtana (United Maharashtra), 1949.
