= Communist Party of India (Marxist–Leninist) Mass Line =

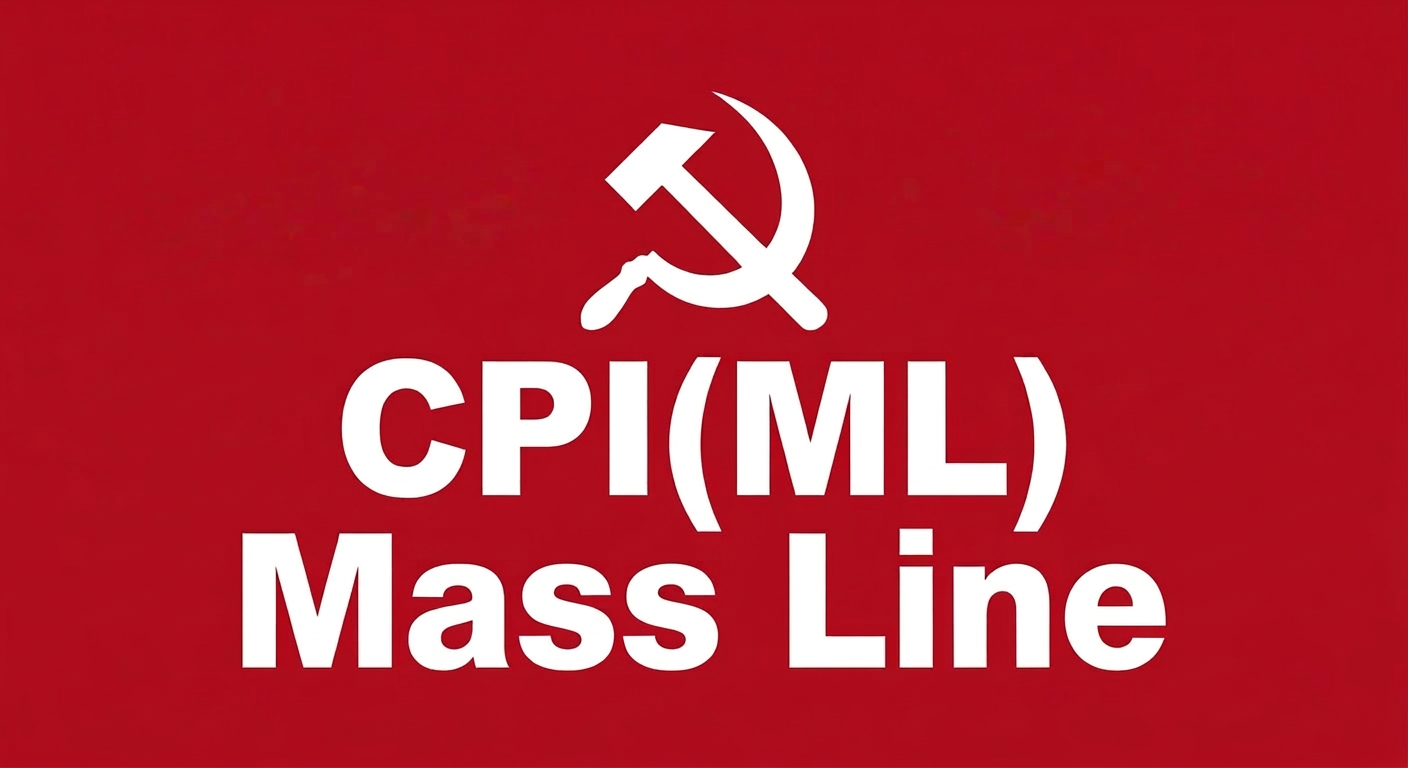
- Abbreviation: CPI(ML) Mass Line
- General Secretary: Pradip Singha Thakur
- Founded: March 5, 2024; 2 years ago
- Headquarters: 24/12, Central Road, Munirkakunj, Dinpur Ext. Najafgarh, New Delhi-110043
- Newspaper: Mass Line, Liberation, Comrade
- Ideology: Marxism–Leninism; Mao Zedong Thought; Anti-revisionism; Mass line
- Political position: Far-left
- Colors: Red

Communist Party of India (Marxist–Leninist) Mass Line or CPI(ML) Mass Line is a far‑left political party in India, established on 5 March 2024 in Khammam, Telangana, via the merger of three Marxist–Leninist groups: PCC,CPI(ML); Communist Party of India (Marxist–Leninist) Revolutionary Initiative and CPI(ML) Praja Pantha.

== History ==
The CPI(ML) Mass Line draws lineage from various splinter groups of the original CPI(ML):

- The Provisional Central Committee, CPI(ML) (est. 1973) led by Santosh Rana adopted a parliamentary‑focused line.
- The Central Reorganisation Committee, CPI(ML) (1979–1991) championed a “mass line” approach and published Mass Line, Liberation, Comrade.
- These, along with the CPI(ML) Revolutionary Initiative and Praja Pantha, united in a three-day Khammam conference in March 2024.

== Ideology and policies ==
CPI(ML) Mass Line espouses:

- Marxism–Leninism and Mao Zedong Thought
- Anti‑revisionism and revolutionary socialism
- The mass line method – organizing workers, peasants, students, women, and oppressed communities to advance revolutionary politics.

== Organizational structure ==
The party operates with:

- A National Committee guiding politics and strategy
- State Committees active in Telangana, Kerala, Maharashtra, Bihar, Jharkhand, West Bengal, Odisha, Punjab, Haryana, Assam, Tripura, Tamil Nadu, Andhra Pradesh
- Affiliate mass organizations (labor, peasant, student, youth, women) built on the precedent of earlier CPI(ML) mass fronts

== Activities ==
- July 2024: urged Indian civil society to condemn attacks on minority Hindus in Bangladesh.
- February 2025: criticised Bijapur security operation by Indian security forces against Maoist insurgents, and urged the Maoists to engage in democratic struggle.
- Organized major rallies, including a Hyderabad dharna demanding justice for political prisoners.
- Merger of West Bengal CPI(ML) State Organising Committee into the Party.
- CPI(ML) Mass Line Telengana State secretary Potu Ranga Rao, State secretariat members Hanmesh and Gaddam Sadanandam, met with former Maoist leaders Tippiri Thirupati alias Devuji, Malla Raji Reddy alias Sangram and Damodar when they visited the State secretariat building - the Marx Bhavan.
- July 2026: Merger of RCC (represented by Bachcha Prasad Singh) into the party

== Publications ==
- Mass Line (continuation of CRC publication)
- Liberation and Comrade (legacy journals from predecessor factions)

== See also ==
- Communist Party of India (Marxist–Leninist) Liberation
- Communist Party of India (Marxist–Leninist) Red Flag
- Communist Party of India (Marxist–Leninist) Red Star
- Central Reorganisation Committee, CPI(ML)
- Provisional Central Committee, CPI(ML)
- List of anti-revisionist groups
- List of Naxalite and Maoist groups in India
