= Communist Party of India (Marxist–Leninist) Janashakti =

- Founded: 1992
- Merged into: Communist Party of India (Marxist–Leninist)
- Ideology: Communism; Marxism–Leninism; Maoism; Naxalism
- Political position: Far-left
- International affiliation: ICMLPO
- Colours: Red

Communist Party of India (Marxist–Leninist) Janashakti (abbreviated as CPI (M–L) Janashakti or simply Janashakti), (Note: Also romanized as Janasakti. The word "Janashakti" means "People's Unity".) was a communist political party in India.

== History ==
=== Foundation process ===
In November 1990, a Joint Note by CPI (M-L) Resistance, UCCRI (M-L) (Muktigami) faction led by Viswam and Madhu, and CPI (M-L) Towards New Democracy was signed for the base of unity. However TND group after a time withdraw itself from the process. In response a group called CPI (M-L) Agami Yug led by Paila Vasudeva Rao split from the CPI (M-L) TND and rejoined to the unity process. CPI (M-L) led by Khokan Majumdar, Coordination Committee of Communist Revolutionaries led by Parimal Dasgupta and Communist Revolutionary Group for Unity led by Jiten Dasgupta also joined to this process, which resulted with the foundation of CPI (M-L) Janashakti in 1992. Group unified several traditions.

CPI (M-L) Janashakti is mostly based in the revolutionary tradition of Andhra Pradesh, with the mass line developed by Chandra Pulla Reddy and T. Nagi Reddy, legends of the Telangana Rebellion. The party followed a combination of both armed underground and parliamentary methods of struggle. Initially things went well for the party, and in the 1994 assembly elections of Andhra Pradesh Vidhan Sabha it won a seat. It had launched 13 candidates in all and won the Sirsilla assembly seat in Karimnagar district. N. V. Krishnaiah was the candidate who won the Sirsilla seat.

A trade union, All India Federation of Trade Unions, and a peasants movement were built up.

=== Splits ===
But the unity did not last for long. In 1996 a group left the party, and they later formed Communist Party of India (Marxist–Leninist) Unity Initiative (today part of Communist Party of India (Marxist–Leninist) (Kanu Sanyal)). A series of splits followed it and party split into several factions, which work with little or without coordination. Towards the end of the 1990s the main faction reoriented itself towards the underground armed struggle, and pulled out of the open mass work.

==== K. Rajanna faction ====
The main faction is the group led by Koora Rajanna. Narayanalingam Tyagaraju (Com. Subhash) is the Andhra Pradesh state secretary of the party. He was arrested in 2012 by Guntur police. The All India secretary of the party is Com. Misro. The party conducts armed struggle through dalams. Police sources has claimed that CPI (M-L) Janashakti has 200 to 300 armed cadres.

Ahead of the 2004 Lok Sabha elections, CPI (M-L) Janashakti signed a joint boycott declaration together with the Communist Party of India (Marxist–Leninist) People's War and the MCC(I).

On 23 September 2004, the Andhra Pradesh state government declared they would hold peace talks with CPI (M-L) Janashakti and Peoples War Group. These peace talks went in vain when both the government and the revolutionary parties did not hold trust in the other.

K. Rajanna's wife Rangavalli died in an encounter November 11, 1999. On 31 August 2006 police arrested K. Rajanna, Andhra Pradesh state committee members Yerramreddy Narasimha Reddy (Satyam), Nambhi Narsimhaiah (Ram Pullaiah), Maharashtra State Committee Secretary Ramakishan Pawar (Ram) and District Committee Secretary of Bijnore (UP) Ashok Kumar Rajput, according to police after an assault to police by them. AP State Committee of Janashakthi declared that Mr. Koora Rajanna was not a member of CPI(M-L) Janashakti. In April 2008 K. Rajanna's brother K. Amar (Devendar), who was State Committee Secretary and one of the two people who represented Janashakti during 2004 peace talks, was arrested. In May 2015, 11 members of the Rajanna faction including Rajanna himself was arrested in Kurnool district. Arrested ones were K. Rajanna, Andhe Balaji, Vadde Pothanna, Pandla Penchalaiah, Nanbhi Narsimhaiah, Venkatrao, Nagendra Rao, Veeranjaneyulu, Sunkanna, Vasanthu and Sreenu. After his arrest 20 cases were registered against him, however state itself withdrew 5 of them, and he was acquitted from the 13 cases out of remaining 15 cases. On August 1, 2022 he was arrested with a non-bailable warrant (NBW) pending against him. The reason for his arrest was him not attending the court.

==== COC faction ====
A group of leaders of the Janashakti split from the organisation, and formed CPI (M-L) Janashakti (COC) c. 1996. COC faction was led by P.K. Murty, Viswam, Madhu, Gananath Patro and Pradeep Benarjee and Somanath Chatarjee. First Madhu, a short time after him Viswam was leading this group. N. V. Krishnaiah was also affiliated with it. COC faction united with the Communist Party of India (Marxist–Leninist) New Initiative led by Arvind Sinha to form the Communist Party of India (Marxist–Leninist) Unity Initiative, c. 1999. CPI (M-L) UI united with the Communist Organisation of India (Marxist-Leninist) led by Kanu Sanyal and founded Communist Party of India (Marxist–Leninist). Viswam today leads Kanu Sanyal's group.

==== Veeranna faction ====
Another break-away group was Communist Party of United States of India founded by Majoru Veerana (also referred to as the Janashakti Veeranna faction). This group put more emphasis on caste issue than the former Janashakti. On May 16, 1999, Majoru Veerana killed in an encounter, allegedly in a fake one.

==== K. Ramachandran faction ====
K. Ramachandran faction was another big faction, coming after Rajanna faction. In December 2003, M.V. Prasad and Raghavulu split from the Rajanna faction regarding the issue of the misuse of funds. This group which was based in coastal region later united with Ramachandran faction, with Prasad being spokesman of the group. On June 18, 2005, gunmen from the Rajanna faction shot dead M.V. Prasad at Mamillagudem toll-gate in the Mothe area of Nalgonda district. Ramachandran faction united with the CPI (M-L) Pratighatana in August 2005 to form "CPI (M-L)" with its publication being Janashakti. In 2009 this unity ended, with CPI (M-L) expelling the Ramachandran and his affiliated people.

==== Others ====
Another faction, the South Regional Provincial Committee, merged with Communist Party of India (Marxist–Leninist) (Chandra Pulla Reddy) on 11 April 2004, thus forming the Communist Party of India (Marxist–Leninist) Janashakti (Chandra Pulla Reddy).

In 2007 Virasam AP state secretary was affiliated with CPI (M-L) Janashakti. He was also arrested in July 2009 and Adhikaara Pratinidhi Azaad (Com. Subhash) became AP state secretary. The party had a leading role in the Andhra Pradesh revolutionary movement. In April 2011 at Guntur district of AP, 7 members of CPI (M-L) Janashakti were arrested and 2dbbl guns, one 8mm rifle, one 9mm pistol, and two tapanchas were lost at this incident.

In June 2011, Party bulletin Janashakti released in Telugu. Today party is organising under the name of CPI (M-L) Janashakti Re-Organising Committee. This group also tries to merge with CPI (M-L) Praja Prathighatana.

In June 2011, majority members of the Andhra Regional Committee of CPI (M-L) Praja Prathighatana, under the presidency of Com. Vijayakumar, joined to CPI (M-L) Janashakti.

In 2013, a fraction or group of members of the CPI (M-L) Janashakti merged into CPIML.

Today the party is primarily concentrated in Andhra Pradesh.

== See also ==
- List of Naxalite and Maoist groups in India
