= Lal Nishan Party (Leninvadi) =

Far-left political party in India from 1988

- Leader: Bhimrao Bansod
- Founded: 1988
- Dissolved: 2025
- Split from: Lal Nishan Party
- Merged into: CPIML Liberation
- Headquarters: Pune, Maharashtra
- Ideology: Communism; Marxism–Leninism
- Political position: far-left

Lal Nishan Party (Leninvadi) (Red Flag Party (Leninist)) was a communist political party in the Indian state of Maharashtra. LNP(L) was formed a splinter group of Lal Nishan Party in 1988. LNP(L) was critical to that LNP had gotten closer to the Indian National Congress and the Perestroika.

• LNP(L) was mainly concentrated to trade union activism. The trade union organization of the party is called Sarva Shramik Sanghathan. The strongest base of LNP(L) is in Pune. In general, LNP(L) does not contest elections in the current years. Its President was Madhukar Katre.

• LNP(L) had maintained good relation with some ML Fraction groups specially with Communist Party of India (Marxist-Leninist) Liberation and Red Flag.

• The party was led by Ashok Manohar until his death in 2003. After the dead of Ashok Manohar the party is led by Bhimrao Bansod.

• Ahead of the Lok Sabha elections 2004 LNP(L) supported the candidates of Communist Party of India (Marxist-Leninist) Red Flag.

• LNP(L) published Leninwadi Lalnishan monthly paper from Pune the city of 'Maharashtra'.

• On 31 May 2025, LNP(L) merged with CPIML Liberation with a joint merging convention.
