= CPI (disambiguation) =

CPI, or consumer price index, is a statistical estimate of the level of prices of goods and services bought for consumption purposes by households.

- Consumer price index by country

CPI may also refer to:

== Organizations ==
=== Independent organizations ===
- Center for Public Integrity, a defunct American nonprofit investigative journalism organization
- Centre for Public Integrity (Australia), an independent research institute founded in 2019

=== Private companies ===
- Centre for Process Innovation, a British social enterprise
- Computer Peripherals Inc, a former printer maker
- CPI International, US electronics company

=== Political parties ===
- Centrists for Italy, a political party in Italy
- Communist Party of India (disambiguation)
- Communist Party of Iran
- Communist Party of Ireland
- Constitutionalist Party of Iran
- Communist Party of Indonesia

=== Other organizations ===
- China Power Investment Corporation (CPI Group), a former state electricity producer in China
- Commission on Public Integrity, former name of an independent commission within the government of Iraq
- Committee on Public Information, US WWI organization, an independent government agency
- Congrès paléoethnologique international of the International Union of Prehistoric and Protohistoric Sciences
- Italian Paralympic Committee (Comitato Paralimpico Italiano, CPI)

== Technology ==
- Center-pivot irrigation, in agriculture
- Characters per inch, in typography
- Counts per inch, speed of a computer mouse
- Cycles per instruction, in microprocessors

== Other uses ==
- California Psychological Inventory, a psychological test
- Chinese Pidgin English, ISO 639-3 code
- Club Penguin Island, a 2017 online game
- Corruption Perceptions Index, of countries
- Cost Per Impression, in advertising
- Cost performance index in earned value management
