= Communist Party of India (Marxist–Leninist) =

Far-left political party in India from 1969 to 1972

- General Secretary: Charu Majumdar
- Founded: 22 April 1969
- Dissolved: 31 July 1972
- Split from: Communist Party of India (Marxist)
- Succeeded by: Communist Party of India (Maoist); Communist Party of India (Marxist–Leninist) Liberation etc.
- Newspaper: Liberation (English); Deshabrati (Bengali); Lok-yuddh (Hindi)
- Ideology: Communism Marxism–Leninism Mao Zedong Thought Anti-revisionism
- Political position: Far-left
- Colours: Red

Party flag

The Communist Party of India (Marxist–Leninist) (CPI(ML)) was an Indian communist party formed by the All India Coordination Committee of Communist Revolutionaries (AICCCR) at a congress in Calcutta in 1969. The foundation of the party was declared by Kanu Sanyal at a mass meeting in Calcutta on 22 April, Vladimir Lenin's birthday. Later the CPI(ML) party splintered into several Naxalite groups.

== Origin ==
The CPI was formed by the radicals within the Communist Party of India (Marxist) (CPM) who grew concerned about the increasingly parliamentary character of its politics. A debate ensued in which the radicals accused the CPM leadership of turning towards revisionism. Finally, the CPI purged the radicals, who went to form the CPI (ML). The CPI (ML) advocated armed revolution and denounced participation in the electoral process. Its leaders were Charu Majumdar and Saroj Dutta, both of whom had belonged to the left-wing within the CPM in northern West Bengal. Sanyal, Jongol Santhal and their followers had mobilised a revolutionary peasant movement in Naxalbari, which evolved into an armed uprising of the mostly Santhal tribal inhabitants. CPI (ML) saw Naxalbari as the spark that would start a new Indian revolution, and the movement came to be known as the "naxalite" movement. In several parts of India, for example Uttar Pradesh, Bihar, other parts of West Bengal, and in Srikakulam in northern Andhra Pradesh, the CPI (ML) organised guerrilla units. The party received moral support from China, which actively encouraged the attempts of CPI (ML) to launch revolution.

According to Pradip Basu in his book Towards Naxalbari (1953-1967): An Account of Inner-Party Ideological Struggle:

"There were two nuclei of radicals in the party organisation in West Bengal. One 'theorist' section around Parimal Das Gupta in Calcutta, which wanted to persuade the party leadership to correct revisionist mistakes through inner-party debate, and one 'actionist' section led by Charu Majumdar and Kanu Sanyal in North Bengal. The 'actionists' were impatient, and strived to organize armed uprisings. According to Basu, due to the prevailing political climate of youth and student rebellion it was the 'actionists' which came to dominate the new Maoist movement in India, instead of the more theoretically advanced sections."

=== Naxalbari uprising ===
It occurred in Naxalbari of Siliguri subdivision, Darjeeling district under the leadership of communist leaders like Charu Majumdar and others who later became the part of CPI (ML).

=== Srikakulam peasant uprising ===
In the Srikakulam district of Andhra Pradesh, communist leaders aligned themselves with the then formed AICCCR and launched peasant upsurge in Srikakulam which continued for almost 5 years in late 1960s and early 1970s.

== After 1970 ==
The first party congress was held in Calcutta 1970. A Central Committee was elected. As a result of both external repression and a failure to maintain internal unity, the movement did however degenerate into extreme sectarianism. Instead of popular armed struggle in the countryside, individual terrorism in Calcutta became a principal method of struggle. In 1971 Satyanarayan Singh revolted against the leadership, "individual killing of people branded as class enemy" and sectarianism of Majumdar. The result became that the party was split into two, one CPI (ML) led by Satyanarayan Singh and one CPI (ML) led by Majumdar. In 1972, frail and broken Majumdar died of multiple diseases in police custody; after his death a series of splits took place during the major part of the 1970s. The Naxalite movement suffered a period of extremely harsh repression that rivalled the Dirty Wars of South America at the same time that the movement got all more fragmented.

After Majumdar's death the CPI (ML) central committee split into pro- and anti-Majumdar factions. In December 1972 the Central Committee of the pro-Charu Majumdar CPI (ML) led by Sharma and Mahadev Mukherjee adopted resolution to follow the line of Charu Majumdar unconditionally which others did not agree to. The pro-Charu Majumdar CPI (ML) later split into pro- and anti-Lin Biao factions. The pro-Lin Biao faction became known as Communist Party of India (Marxist–Leninist) (Mahadev Mukherjee) and the anti-Lin Biao-group later became known as Communist Party of India (Marxist–Leninist) Liberation and was led by Jauhar, Vinod Mishra, Swadesh Bhattacharya.

== Legacy ==
Today, there exist a large number of political organisations whose roots are in the AICCCR/CPI (ML). Only C.P.I (M-L) faction led by Mahadev Mukherjee follows Charu Majumdar's concept of armed revolution and annihilation, whereas others have condemned the excesses of the sectarian epoch. All the organisations belonging to the later category have established legal overground structures (trade unions, student groups, peasant organisations, etc.) and started participating in elections.

== Splinter groups ==
Current parties and organisations with origins in CPI (ML) include

- CPI (Maoist)
- Naxalbari
- Liberation led by Dipankar Bhattacharya
- Mass Line
- Red Star led by K.N. Ramchandran
- Red Flag
- MLPI (Red Flag) led by P.C. Unnichekkan
- Central Team
- New Initiative
- Unity Initiative
- Class Struggle
- People's War
- New Democracy led by Yatendra Kumar
- Maoist Unity Centre
- Bolshevik
- People's Liberation
- Organising Committee
- Central Organising Committee
- Second Central Committee
- Party Unity
- Provisional Central Committee
- Central Reorganisation Committee
- Communist Party of United States of India led by Veeranna
- Somnath faction led by Somnath Chatterjee Ukhra and Pradip Banerjee
- Shantipal faction
- Umadhar Singh faction
- Janashakti led by Koora Rajanna
- Janashakti - Ranadheer led by Ranadheer
- Janashakti - Chandra Pulla Reddy led by Chandra Pulla Reddy
- Mahadev Mukherjee faction led by Mahadev Mukherjee
- Praja Pantha
- Jan Samvad
- Nai Pahal
- New Proletarian
- Maharashtra
- Bhaijee
- Prajashakti
- Prathighatana
- Praja Pratighatana
- Vimochana

== See also ==
- List of anti-revisionist groups
