= Pramod Mishra =

Indian politician

Pramod Mishra is a Maoist politician and senior politburo member of Communist Party of India (Maoist).

== Career ==
Mishra is a Bhumihar from a village in Aurangabad, Bihar. He was a prominent leader of the erstwhile Naxalite group Maoist Communist Centre of India. Mishra organised a large scale land movement in Bihar after the death of Kanai Chatterjee. After the formation of CPI (Maoist) in 2004, he became the Central Committee member of the Party. Mishra was known as Bibiji, Agni and Ban Bihari inside the party. According to the Bihar police he was wanted in two dozen cases of murder, arson and looting in Bihar, Jharkhand and Chhattisgarh. In the ninth Party Congress held in 2007, he was selected as politburo member and made in-charge of Delhi operations. Mishra was busy of spreading the movement to the North India, including Haryana, Punjab as well as Jammu and Kashmir. His name figured in the United States Department's Country Reports on Terrorism, 2006. On 11 May 2008, a team of Special Task Force of Bihar Police arrested him from a rented house at Barmasia. Mishra was released in August 2017 due to lack of evidences and settled in village under Kasma police station as an Ayurveda Doctor. After two months from his release, he went missing. Till date, he is still missing.
