= Mamidi =

Mamidi (Telugu: మామిడి) is a Telugu surname. Notable people with the surname include:

- Mamidi Appalasuri (died 1997), Indian politician
- Mamidi Govinda Rao (born 1976), Indian politician
- Mamidi Harikrishna, Indian poet
