= Santosh Rana =

Indian politician (1942–2019)

Member of the West Bengal Legislative Assembly
- In office 1977–1982
- Constituency: Gopiballavpur

General Secretary of PCC-CPIML
- In office 1972–2016

Central Committee member of CPIML
- In office 1969–1971

Personal details
- Born: 1942 Gopiballavpur, West Bengal, India
- Died: 29 June 2019 (aged 76) Deshapriya Park, Kolkata, India
- Party: PCC-CPIML; CPIML(1969-71)
- Spouse: Jayarsri (divorced)
- Children: 1
- Education: Presidency College, University of Calcutta, Raja Bazar Science College

Santosh Rana (1942 – 29 June 2019) was an Indian politician. In the 1960s, he was a prominent figure in the armed struggle of the Naxalites led by Charu Majumdar. Rana received Ananda Puraskar for his book Rajnitir Ek Jibon in 2018.

== Agrarian revolutionary ==
In the 1960s, Santosh Rana was a research scholar at University of Calcutta, Rajabazar Science College. He was preparing for his PhD in physics. Politically he was a supporter of the CPI(M). The first United Front government came to power in West Bengal in 1967 and in 1969 CPI(ML) heralded the launch of a new revolutionary party. The call of revolution inspired Santosh Rana. He left his PhD unfinished, returned to his village in Gopiballavpur and joined the agrarian revolution.

Under his leadership, Debra, Gopiballavpur, Nayagram and Lodhasuli blocks of Midnapore district and adjoining areas in Bihar (now Jharkhand) and Orissa were 'virtually liberated'. In an interview Santosh Rana said, "In the seventies, we began our work not in forest areas like Nayagram, Binpur or Lalgarh. But mainly in densely populated Debra-Gopiballavpur along the bank of Subarnarekha river where class contradictions were sharp over land and wage questions. We endeared ourselves to poor peasants and landless by focusing on land issues as well as exploitation by the money-lenders." He recollects, "During my time, a mass of about 15,000 to 20,000 people, armed with lathis, stormed into the houses of the landlords who possessed firearms, and seized the arms. That was a big blow for the landlords or jotdars and they failed to resist our move to grab ceiling-excess land and distribute it among the landless bargadars. This was not violence, it was people’s revolt. Such pressure is always required in remote villages where landlords maintain personal armies."

== CPI(ML) reorganisation ==
The CPI(ML) movement began to splinter by the early seventies and by 1971 or 1972, it was in shambles. Santosh Rana broke with Charu Majumdar in 1971 and later joined the group led by Satyanarayan Singh, a prominent leader, who also rebelled against Charu Majumdar in 1971, leading to a split in the CPI(ML). In April 1973 Satyanarayan Singh's party was reorganized. The PCC, CPI (ML) evolved out of the group loyal to Satyanarayan Singh. Subsequently, Santosh Rana became general secretary of this party. This faction was amongst the earliest Naxalites to take part in elections.

== Electoral efforts ==
Contesting as an independent, Rana won the Gopiballavpur seat in 1977, but lost it in 1982.

== Maoists ==
Rana disagreed with the actions of the Maoists in the Jungle Mahals. He said, "Differences between the original CPI(ML) and today’s CPI(Maoist) are too many. Despite our criticism of Charu Majumdar’s line of annihilation campaign, I must point out that he never asked us for indiscriminate killings like today’s Maoists. In 1969-71, I was active in Debra-Gopiballavpur region, close to Lalgarh, now a major base of the Maoists. We killed around 120 people, most of them landlords or their henchmen … Today, I feel most of these killings were unnecessary. But unlike the CPI(Maoist), we killed not a single tribal, Dalit and poor people in the seventies in Debra-Gopiballavpur."

He further says, "The CPI(ML) is alarmed at the situation in Jangalmahal where in some areas armed CPI(M) supporters are capturing villages with the help of Joint Forces while in others, the Trinamool Congress is capturing villages with the help of Maoist squads. None of them has any respect for the democratic rights of the people. The CPI(ML) has been active in the area for over forty years and led innumerable struggles of the workers, peasants, Dalits and Adivasis on the issues of wages, land, irrigation, forest rights and Dalit-Adivasi rights. In recent times, it has organized the people against atrocities by Joint Forces and against pollution of sponge iron factories."
