= Marxist–Leninist Party =

Marxist–Leninist Party may refer to any Marxist–Leninist political party or:

- Marxist–Leninist Party of Austria
- Marxist–Leninist Party of Canada
- Marxist–Leninist Communist Party of Ecuador
- Marxist-Leninist Party of India (Red Flag)
- Italian Marxist–Leninist Party
- Marxist–Leninist Party of Germany
- Marxist–Leninist Party of the Netherlands
- Marxist-Leninist Party of Nicaragua
- Marxist–Leninist Party of Quebec
- Marxist-Leninist Party (Communist Reconstruction) (Spain)
- Marxist–Leninist Communist Party (Turkey)
- Marxist–Leninist Party, USA
- Communist Party (Marxist–Leninist) (United States)

== See also ==
- Marxist–Leninist Communist Party (disambiguation)
