= Nava Yuva Samithi =

Youth wing of Communist Party of India (Marxist-Leninist) in Andhra Pradesh

Nava Yuva Samiti (New Youth Association) is the youth wing of Communist Party of India (Marxist-Leninist) in Andhra Pradesh.
