= Janakiya Samskarika Vedi =

Janakiya Samskarika Vedi (Malayalam for 'Democratic Cultural Forum') was the cultural mass front of the Central Reorganisation Committee, Communist Party of India (Marxist-Leninist) in Kerala, India, 1980–1982. The predecessor of the organisation was the Wynadu Samskarika Vedi from Wynad. The State Secretary of the organisation was Kaviyur Balan. After its formation in 1980, the organisation took over the organ Prerana.

In 1982 the organisation was dissolved due to state repression and internal strife. Many in the movement turned against the CRC, CPI(ML) after the killing of the 'people's enemy' Madathil Mathai in Wynad.
