= Central Organising Committee, Communist Party of India (Marxist–Leninist) Party Unity =

Communist party in India

- General Secretary: Naveen Prasad alias Narayan Sanyal
- Founded: 1982
- Dissolved: 11 August 1998
- Merger of: CPI(ML) Unity Organisation and faction of COC, CPI(ML)
- Merged into: CPI(ML) People's War

The Central Organising Committee, Communist Party of India (Marxist–Leninist) Party Unity, more commonly known as CPI(ML) Party Unity or simply 'Party Unity', was a communist party in India 1982-1998. Narayan Sanyal alias Naveen Prasad was the general secretary of the party. Party Unity was the official organ of the party. CPI(ML) Party Unity was one of the predecessors of the Communist Party of India (Maoist).

The activity of CPI(ML) Party Unity was concentrated in central Bihar; the districts of Jehanabad, Gaya, Aurangabad, Palamu, Nalanda and Nawada. The party was also present in West Bengal, Andhra Pradesh and Punjab.

== Origins ==
The party was founded in 1982, through the mergers of CPI(ML) Unity Organisation of Naveen Prasad (Bihar) and Bhowani Roy Chowdhury (West Bengal) and the COC, CPI(ML) faction led by M. Appalasuri. CPI(ML) Unity Organisation had been founded in 1978 by a group of Naxalites from the Jehanabad-Palamu area, that had been released from prison in 1977. The Central Organising Committee, Communist Party of India (Marxist-Leninist) had been formed by some elements of the erstwhile CPI(ML). The COC, CPI(ML) upheld the legacy of Charu Majumdar but was ready to retain a critical attitude to some aspects of Majumdar's role.

== Political orientation ==
The party advocated agrarian revolution and protracted people's war. CPI(ML) Party Unity conducted armed struggle, advocating attacks on upper castes as a means of mobilizing Dalits for agrarian reform. The party denounced participation in elections.

A party congress was held in 1987. The congress issued the following statement regarding the tasks of the party: "We are tackling the steadily increasing armed onslaughts of the state, through mass resistance. But gradually the squads too will have to come forward to participate in this resistance. At the phase of confiscating all lands of the landlords and on the eve of building up the guerilla zone, the activities of the squads will be the main aspect of the people's resistance against the armed attacks of the state."

== Class warfare ==
The party had armed 'Red Squads' operating in Bihar. CPI(ML) Party Unity was involved in violent confrontations with private armies (senas) of landlords.

On 1 December 1997 Ranvir Sena attacked the CPI(ML) Party Unity stronghold Lakshmanpur-Bathe, killing 63 lower caste people.

== Mass struggles ==
CPI(ML) Unity Organisation had launched a mass organisation, the Mazdoor Kisan Sangram Samiti ('Worker-Peasant Struggle Association'), together with Dr. Vinayan (an ex-socialist mass leader). CPI(ML) Party Unity effectively functioned as the armed wing of MKSS. CPI(ML) Party Unity managed to get the Bhoomi Sena (a Kurmi caste private army) to formally surrender to MKSS. In 1986 MKSS was banned. Eventually there was a rupture between Dr. Vinayan and the party, and Dr. Vinayan's MKSS faction denounced the party in 1987. CPI(ML) Party Unity launched the Mazdoor Kisan Sangram Parishad as its new peasant front.

Other mass fronts of CPI(ML) Party Unity included Lok Sangram Morcha ('People's Struggle Front'), Jan Mukti Parishad ('People's Liberation Council') and Bihar Nari Sangathan ('Bihar Women's Organisation'). Jan Mukti Parishad organised land seizures in Bihar, the organisation itself claimed to have redistributed 5,000 acres of land in the state. Through its land seizure struggles, CPI(ML) Party Unity became associated with its slogan jameen jabtee, fasal jabtee ('Seize land, seize crops').

== Confrontation and unity ==
CPI(ML) Party Unity frequently clashed with other leftwing groups in Bihar. It fought over control of the Kurtha and Makdampur areas of Jehanabad district with CPI(ML) Liberation. CPI(ML) Liberation claimed that CPI(ML) Party Unity had killed 82 of its followers, whilst CPI(ML) Party Unity claimed CPI(ML) Liberation had killed 65 of its cadres. 50 people were killed in clashes between CPI(ML) Party Unity and the Maoist Communist Centre. Conflict between CPI(ML) Party Unity and MCC was most intense in areas of Gaya district; Tekari, Konch and Belaganj.

However, there were also moves towards unity between the competing factions. During the 1980s, there was cooperation between the MKSS and CPI(ML) Liberation in the struggle against Bhoomi Sena and state repression. The two parties jointly founded Daman Virodhi Sanyukt Morcha ('United Anti-Repression Front'). After the Arwal massacre of 1986, the two groups organised a historic gherao outside the Bihar Legislative Assembly. CPI(ML) Liberation broke all links to CPI(ML) Party Unity in 1988, after two massacres committed by CPI(ML) Party Unity in Jehanabad district in which 30 CPI(ML) Liberation followers were killed. In 1993 the All India People's Resistance Forum (AIPRF) was founded, a legal organization. AIPRF was co-sponsored by CPI(ML) Party Unity, MCC and the Communist Party of India (Marxist-Leninist) People's War, and functioned as a centre of coordination of activities amongst middle-class constituencies for the three groups.

On 11 August 1998 CPI(ML) Party Unity merged with CPI(ML) People's War. The unified party retained the name CPI(ML) People's War. The merger was the result of a five-year-long process of negotiations between the two parties. Through the merger with CPI(ML) Party Unity, CPI(ML) People's War gained a foothold in northern India.

== See also ==
- 1997 Raghopur Massacre
