= 1997 Raghopur Massacre =

Incident in a series of caste related violence in the Eastern Indian state of Bihar

The 1997 Raghopur massacre was an incident in a series of caste related violence in the Eastern Indian state of Bihar. Raghopur is a village located in Patut Panchayat of Bihta block of Patna district which is also home to the state capital Patna. On the night of 21 April 1997, an armed squad of Communist Party of India (Marxist-Leninist) Party Unity entered the village and selectively killed 6 men after identifying them as members of Bhumihar caste. The house of Janardhana Sharma, a local member of the Bihar Legislative Assembly, was blown up twice by explosives.

== Massacre ==
At the time of the massacre Raghopur consisted of 150 households with Bhumihars and Musahars being the predominant castes in the village. There were around 50 Bhumihar households and 50 Musahar households. Other major castes living in the village included Dusadhs and Kanu Saus with one or two households belonging to other castes including a Muslim household. Most of the land in the village was owned by Bhumihars with two families owning more than 20 acres and all other families owning 5-10 acres of land.

The attack took place after midnight. In first strike, at around 12:30 AM the unoccupied house of Janardhana Sharma was blown up with explosives. Pawan Singh (25 years), who was sleeping inside the house, was pulled outside and shot after ascertaining his caste and identity. Post the explosion the Naxals circled the village and gathered as many people as possible to kill. Some were killed at sight after making attempt to warn the villagers while others were taken outside the village to be killed collectively .

Three men were also picked to be killed but let go after they claimed to not be Bhumihars. Mr Janardhana Sharma's house was blown up once again at 12:50 AM.

Greater casualties in the massacre was prevented due to the Naxal's inability to account for new phone lines that had been installed in the village a few months before the attack. Members of the village were able to contact the police in neighboring Nagahar village and the first squad of police were in village by 1:15 AM.

== Aftermath ==
FIRs against 25 people were lodged in the nearby police stations of Bikram, Rania Talab and Paliganj. A police camp with 12 policemen was set up to provide round the clock security to the village after the incident. The families of the deceased were given an ex gratia compensation of Rs 10,000.
