= Kamgar Kisan Paksha =

Defunct Indian political party

The Kamgar Kisan Paksha ('Worker Peasant Party') was a political party in Bombay State, India. The party was formed by a group of dissidents from the Peasants and Workers Party of India in November 1951, just before the 1951-1952 elections. The founders of Kamgar Kisan Paksha wanted closer cooperation with the Communist Party of India. Its main leaders were Nana Patil, Datta Deshmukh and D.S. Wagh (popularly known as 'Kakasaheb Wagh').

The party fielded three candidates in the 1951-1952 Lok Sabha election, whom together obtained 132,574 votes (1.15% of the votes in Bombay State). None of its Lok Sabha candidates were elected. Navsherwanji Naorojaji Satha finished in second place in the Ahmednagar South constituency, with 67,239 votes (43.09% of the votes in the constituency). Gambhirrao Avachitrao Chavan finished in third place in the Bhuswal constituency, with 38,450 votes (17.5%). Gopal Ganesh Saundarkar finished in third place in the Nasik Central constituency, with 26,885 votes (13.10%).

The party fielded 33 candidates in the 1952 Bombay State legislative assembly election, whom together obtained 248,130 votes (2.23% of the votes in the state). Deshmukh won one of the two seats from the Akola Sangamner constituency and Patil won the Satara East seat. The election symbol of the party was a bicycle. However, the Greater Bombay area the party contested as part of a joint front with the Communist Party and the Left Socialist Group. The election symbol for this joint front was a railway engine.

Soon the party was split on the issue of the relation with the Communist Party. The tendency led by Patil and Wagh ended up merging itself into the Communist Party of India. A sector, led by Deshmukh and supported by the Navajivan faction (a group expelled from the Communist Party in 1942, which the Peasants and Workers Party had admitted en bloc in 1951), regrouped as the Lal Nishan Gat (Red Flag Group). The Deshmukh group would later be known as the Lal Nishan Party.
