= Madhukar Katre =

Indian politician and trade unionist

Madhukar Katre (born 5 February 1927, Pune, d. 16 January 2009, Ahmednagar) was an Indian politician and trade unionist. Katre joined the freedom struggle during his school days in Kolhapur. He later became a communist and an activist of the Praja Parishad ('People's Assembly', an organization that struggled for the abolition of the Kolhapur Princely State). As a result, from his activist, he was imprisoned for seventeen months.

Katre was a leading figure in the trade union movement. He was General Secretary of the Maharashtra Rajya Sahakari Kamgar Mahasangh, a union of sugar plantation workers. He also led sugar-producing cooperatives in the state. Katre had also been active in movements such as Samyukta Maharashtra (the struggle for a Marathi-speaking state), Goa liberation and the struggle for implementation of the Maharashtra land tenancy legislation.

Politically, Katre had been a leading member of the Lal Nishan Party. After the 1989 split in the party, he became the President of the Lal Nishan Party (Leninvadi).
