= Mamidi Appalasuri =

Indian politician (died 1997)

Mamidi Appalasuri (died 1997) was an Indian communist leader. Appalasuri was one of the leaders of the tribal uprising in Srikakulam. When the Andhra Pradesh Committee of Communist Revolutionaries was expelled from the All India Coordination Committee of Communist Revolutionaries in 1968, Appalasuri remained with the AICCCR led by Charu Majumdar. In 1969 Appalasuri was one of four Central Committee members of the new Communist Party of India (Marxist-Leninist) from Andhra Pradesh.

Appalasuri became a leading figure in the Central Organising Committee, Communist Party of India (Marxist-Leninist), which was formed in 1972 by some elements of the erstwhile CPI(ML). The COC, CPI(ML) upheld the legacy of Majumdar but was ready to retain a critical attitude to some aspects of his role. In August 1974 Appalasuri became one of three members of the Andhra Pradesh State Committee of COC, CPI(ML). Appalasuri represented coastal Andhra Pradesh in the committee. The COC, CPI(ML) would also be torn apart by internal strife. In 1982 Appalasuri's COC, CPI(ML) faction merged with Bhowani Roy Chowdhury's West Bengal-based group, forming the Communist Party of India (Marxist-Leninist) Party Unity.
