= Lal Jhanda Dal =

Communist organization in India

Lal Jhanda Dal ('Red Flag Group') was a communist organization in West Bengal, India. It was one of several Maoist splinter groups that was active in West Bengal as of the late 1960s and early 1970s. The group was led by Swadesh Mitra. Swadesh Mitra had been a leader of the Communist Party of India (Marxist) in Calcutta, but formed part of an oppositional tendency (the 'State Bolshevik Core' or 'Surya Sen Group'). The Bolshevik Core tendency that Mitra belonged to had maintained contacts with the radicals in North Bengal (which launched the Naxalbari uprising).

== See also ==
- List of Naxalite and Maoist groups in India
