= Communist League of India (Marxist–Leninist) =

The Communist League of India (Marxist–Leninist) was founded by a faction of the Central Reorganisation Committee, Communist Party of India (Marxist–Leninist) Ram Nath group on 20 February 1978.

== See also ==
- List of Naxalite and Maoist groups in India
