= Kanai Chatterjee =

Indian politician

- Born: 1933; Baruikhali village, Barisal District, British Raj
- Died: 18 July 1983 (aged 49–50)
- Political party: Maoist Communist Centre of India
- Other political affiliations: Communist Party of India

Kanai Chatterjee popularly known as K.C. (1933 — 18 July 1983) was a Bengali Maoist ideologue, founder of the Maoist Communist Centre of India.

== Early life ==
Chatterjee was born in 1933 at Baruikhali village, Barishal, British India. He participated anti British movement in student life. He completed B.Com and joined student movements led by the undivided Communist Party of India.

== Political activities ==
In 1953 he started work in Tiljala area of Kolkata and became popular amongst the local people. Chatterjee became the secretary of the Ballygunj Local Committee of the Communist Party in 1959. He also took active part in the food movement and seriously injured by police firing. In 1962, he was arrested at the time of Indo China War. Chatterjee launched a magazine Dakhshin Desh with another activist Amulya Sen to fight against revisionism. In 1967, the Naxalbari uprising took place under the leadership of Charu Mazumdar but, due to differences on ideology, Chatterjee's group Dakhshin Desh could not join the Communist Party of India (Marxist–Leninist). On 20 October 1969 he created Maoist Communist Centre with Amulya Sen and Chandrashekar Das. He died at the age of 49, in 1982, due to illness while staying underground.
