= Yuvajanavedi =

Yuvajanavedi ('Youth Popular Association'), is a youth organization linked to the Communist Party of India (Marxist-Leninist) in Kerala. It used to be linked to Communist Party of India (Marxist-Leninist) Red Flag prior to the merger between CPI(ML) and CPI(ML) Red Flag.
