= Communist Party of India (Marxist–Leninist) Prathighatana =

- General Secretary: Phani Bagchi
- Founded: 1988
- Split from: Communist Party of India (Marxist–Leninist) Vimochana
- Newspaper: Prathighatana
- Ideology: Communism; Marxism–Leninism; Mao Zedong Thought; Naxalism
- Political position: Far-left
- Colours: Red

Communist Party of India (Marxist–Leninist) Prathighatana (Note: "Prathighatana" means "Resistance". The word Prathighatana also romanized alternately as Pratighatana too.) (Telugu: కమ్యూనిస్టు పార్టీ ఆఫ్ ఇండియా (మార్క్సిస్ట్-లెనినిస్ట్) ప్రతిఘటన; abbreviated as CPI(M–L)P, Telugu: సీపీఐ (ఎంఎల్‌) ప్రతిఘటన), was a Marxist–Leninist Naxalite party in India, founded as a result of the split within the Communist Party of India (Marxist–Leninist) Vimochana in 1988.

== History ==
Group founded as a split within the Vimochana group. According to P. Arun Kumar the reason of split was "Ramachandran group's principle of accepting arms provided in the Punjab state to counter terrorism", as for the Prathighatana founders Madhusudhan Rahu, Radha, Somachari et al. unacceptable. This group elected Phani Bagchi as General Secretary, and Madhusudhan Raju as State Secretary. After Madhusudhan Raju being killed in 1995, Purushottam Raju (Vinod) succeeded him, but he also died on November 10, 2007.

The group split in 1996 due to Mulugu Area Committee leader Chalamaiah being put under disciplinary proceedings. Chalamaiah split from the group, and founded CPI (M-L) Praja Prathighatana in 1996, and he was killed in 1997.

According to K. V. Thomas, group had its support from districts of Nalgonda, Ranga Reddy, Karimnagar, Warangal, Khammam (all in Telangana region); East Godavari (Coastal Andhra); and Kurnool (Rayalaseema). According to Patricia Gossman of Human Rights Watch, it was the smallest armed group in Andhra Pradesh after (from biggest to smallest) "People's War Group (PWG)", "CPI (M-L) (C. P. Reddy group)", "CPI (M-L) (Praja Pandha group)".

No activity of group has been seen since 2010s.

== See also ==
- List of Naxalite and Maoist groups in India
