= Pradip Basu =

Indian scholar of political science (born 1957)

- Born: 1957 (age 68–69); Kolkata, India

Academic background
- Thesis: Inner-party ideological struggles (1953-1967) leading to Naxalite Movement (1996)
- Doctoral advisor: Prof. Partha Chatterjee

Academic work
- Discipline: Political Science
- Sub-discipline: Naxalism, post- structuralism, postcolonialism, feminism, Ambedkarism and resistance theories of Adivasis, Minorities and environmentalists.

Pradip Basu (Bengali: প্রদীপ বসু; born 1957, Kolkata, India) is an Indian Bangali (Bengali)political scientist. He retired as the Academic Dean of the Faculty of Humanities and Social Sciences, former Head and Professor of political science at the Presidency University, Kolkata.

== Career ==
He was a Research Scholar at the Centre for Studies in Social Sciences, Calcutta (CSSSC) from 1984 to 1985, and then a Doctoral Teacher Fellow of the Indian Council of Social Science Research (ICSSR) from 1988 to 1991. He earned his Ph.D. under the supervision of Professor Partha Chatterjee on inner-party ideological struggles leading to Naxalism. He taught at the University of Kalyani, before moving on to teach at the Scottish Church College (affiliated to Calcutta University), later as a Guest Faculty in the Post Graduate Deptt. of Political Science at the University of Calcutta. From 2010 to 2012, he was a Guest Faculty in the Post Graduate Deptt. of Philosophy at the University of Calcutta. He is the founder and former chief editor of the Journal of Humanities and Social Sciences, which is an annually published refereed journal published by the Scottish Church College. Its advisory board includes Amartya Sen, Gayatri Chakravorty Spivak, Partha Chatterjee, Dipesh Chakraborty, Ashis Nandy, Sobhanlal Datta Gupta, and others. He was the founder-convener of Samaj-o-Chinta, an academic seminar society in Kolkata which conducted monthly seminars in Bengali, from 1991 to 2006.

== Areas of specialization ==
He specializes in the Naxalite movement and post-structuralism, and was actively involved in Naxalite politics during 1974–1981, but gradually became critical of Naxalism and orthodox Marxism, and became interested in Western Marxism, and the works of Antonio Gramsci, Louis Althusser, and the Frankfurt School. Over time he further moved towards post-structuralism, especially the works of Michel Foucault and Jacques Derrida. His chief academic interest lies in working for a possible dialogue between Naxalism, on the one hand and Critical Theories such as post-structuralism, postcolonialism, feminism and Ambedkarism, on the other.

== Books ==
=== Authored books ===
1. Naxalbari-r Purbakshan: Kichhu Postmodern Bhabna (Kolkata: Progressive Publishers), 1998 (ISBN 81-86383-59-X)
2. Towards Naxalbari (1953–1967) (Kolkata: Progressive Publishers), 2000. (ISBN 818638376X)
3. Uttar Adhunik Rajniti O Marxbad (Kolkata: Pustak Bipani), 2005. (ISBN 8185471959)
4. Postmodernism, Marxism, Postcolonialism (Kalna: Avenel Press), 2010. (ISBN 8190252968)
5. Uttar Adhunik Rajniti (Kolkata: Sahityalok), 2010. (ISBN 9390910064)

=== Edited books ===
1. Discourses on Naxalite Movement (1967–2009) (Kolkata: Setu Prakashani), 2010. ISBN 9789380677019
2. Avenel Companion to Modern Social Theorists (Kalna: Avenel) 2011. ISBN 978-9380761145
3. Colonial Modernity: Indian Perspectives (Kolkata: Setu Prakashani) 2011. ISBN 9789380677149
4. Red on Silver: Naxalites in Cinema (Kolkata: Setu Prakashani) 2012. ISBN 9789380677224
5. Modern Social Thinkers (Kolkata: Setu Prakashani) 2012. ISBN 9789380677835
6. Monone Srijone Naxalbari (Kolkata: Setu Prakashani) 2012. ASIN B0CG4XLQ3H
7. Political Sociology (Kolkata: Setu Prakashani) 2016. ISBN 9789380677712
8. Social Thinkers of Modern Times (Kolkata: Setu Prakashani) 2016. ISBN 9789380677835
9. Naxalite Politics: Post-structuralist, Postcolonial and Subaltern Perspectives (Kolkata: Setu Prakashani) 2017. ISBN 9789380677231
10. Theories, Society, Politics (Kalna: Avenel) 2022. ASIN B0C14P29QN
11. Theories, Culture, Politics (Kalna: Avenel) 2022. ISBN 9789390873715
12. Theories, People, Politics (Kolkata: Gangchil) 2022. ISBN 978-9382878018
13. Theories, Processes, Politics (Kolkata: Gangchil) 2022. ISBN 978-0333948552
14. Theories, Reality, Politics (Kolkata: Gangchil) 2023. ISBN 978-1855219939
15. Theories, Interaction, Politics (Kolkata: Gangchil) 2023. ISBN 978-9389292893
16. Gender and Naxalite Movement (Kolkata: Setu Prakashani) 2023. ISBN 9788195706013
17. Caste and Naxalite Politics, (Kolkata: Gangchil) 2023. ISBN 9788119360116
18. Naxalbarir Rajniti o Jaat-Paater Proshno, (Kolkata: Gangchil) 2025, ISBN 978-81-19360-92-5.
