= Communist Party of Bharat =

- Abbreviation: CPB
- General Secretary: Ranjan Chakraborty
- Split from: Communist Party of India (Marxist–Leninist)
- Headquarters: Kolkata, West Bengal
- Ideology: Communism; Marxism-Leninism
- Political position: Left-wing
- Colours: Red

Party flag

Communist Party of Bharat is a Naxalite splinter group of Communist Party of India (Marxist–Leninist). This party has a presence in West Bengal. The party was behind the agitation in Singur and Nandigram. The party secretary is Ranjan Chakraborty and Barnali Mukherjee is the other leader working in mass fronts. The Party distanced itself away from the movement that stemmed from the Nandigram and Singur agitation, citing that the movement went further from a popular movement to a business-lobby backed 'false' movement in spite of other Left parties entangling with the movement.

== See also ==
- List of Naxalite and Maoist groups in India
