= Communist Party of United States of India =

- Leader: M. Veeranna †
- Dates active: 1997 – 2005
- Active regions: Andhra Pradesh
- Ideology: Naxalism; Communism; Marxism-Leninism; Mao Zedong Thought
- Political position: Far-left
- Status: Defunct

The Communist Party of United States of India was an underground Naxalite communist political party in India, based in the state of Andhra Pradesh. The CPUSI was formed on 17 May 1997 as a result of fractional infighting in the Communist Party of India (Marxist-Leninist) Janashakti. The founder of CPUSI was M. Veeranna and it is sometimes referred to as the 'Janashakti Veeranna' faction. Veeranna was later killed by police forces. CPUSI belonged to the section who wanted to put stronger emphasis on caste issues rather than class issues. CPUSI conducted attacks, through 'dalam' squads.

Sadhu Malyadri Jambhav was the Andhra Pradesh state secretary of CPUSI.

In June 2001 a high-ranking leader of CPUSI, Yerra Narasa Reddy, surrendered to the police.

The last incident involving the group was in 2005, when two militants of the group were shot dead by police in Andhra Pradesh.

== See also ==
- List of anti-revisionist groups
- List of Naxalite and Maoist groups in India
