= Central Organising Committee, Communist Party of India (Marxist–Leninist) Shantipal =

Political party in India

Central Organising Committee, Communist Party of India (Marxist–Leninist) Shantipal was an underground political party in India. The Shanti Pal group emerged as through a split in the North Bengal-Bihar Regional Committee of the Communist Party of India (Marxist-Leninist), being the pro-Lin Biao faction. The leader of the faction, Shanti Pal, had been a school teacher in Phansidewa who became a key CPI(ML) leader. After forming his own faction Pal remained loyal to the line of the CPI(ML) leader Charu Majumdar. Pal's party combatted landlords in areas like Godda and Sahebganj. The party opposes participation in elections and calls for armed agrarian revolution.

As of 1981 COC, CPI(ML) Shanti Pal had influence in Bhawanipur, Rupauli, Dhamdaha and Barhatta blocks of Purnea district and parts of Katihar district. On 9 March 1993 COC, CPI(ML) Shanti Pal militants killed nine people in Amjhora village, Banka District. As of 2006 the leader of Shanti Pal group in Madhepura was in jail, sentenced for the killing of a mukhya.

== See also ==
- List of Naxalite and Maoist groups in India
