= Provisional Central Committee, Communist Party of India (Marxist–Leninist) =

Communist party faction

- Abbreviation: PCC, CPI(ML)
- Founder: Satyanarayan Singh
- Founded: 1973
- Dissolved: 2024
- Split from: CPI(ML)
- Merged into: CPI(ML) Mass Line
- Newspaper: For a New Democracy
- Ideology: Communism; Marxism-Leninism-Mao Tse-Tung Thought; Anti-revisionism
- Political position: Far-left
- International affiliation: ICMLPO (defunct); ICOR

The Provisional Central Committee, Communist Party of India (Marxist–Leninist) was a communist political party in India. The general secretary of the party was Santosh Rana. The party was often referred to as CPI(ML) (Santosh Rana Group).

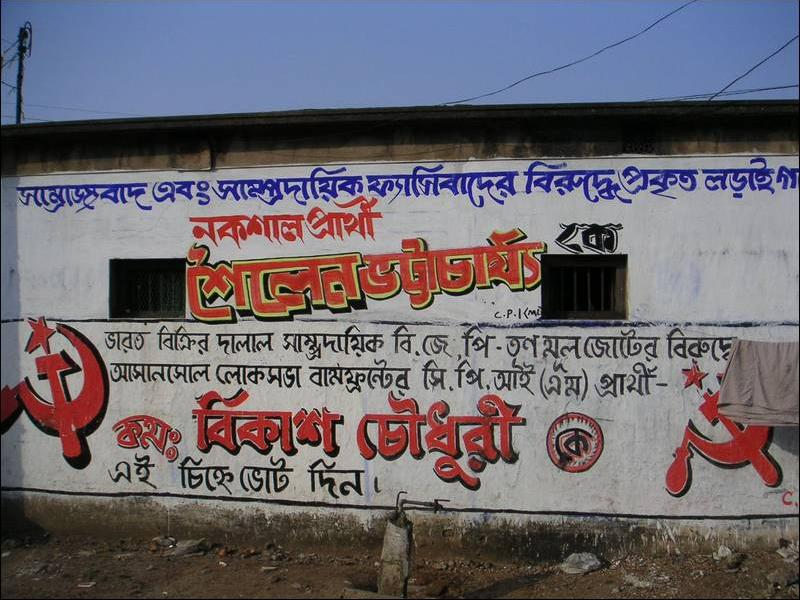
Election propaganda in Ukhra, West Bengal

The PCC, CPI(ML) evolved from the group loyal to Satyanarayan Singh from the original Communist Party of India (Marxist-Leninist). Singh rebelled against the party leader Charu Majumdar in 1971, provoking a split. In April 1973, Singh's party was reorganised.

In March 2024, the party merged with CPI(ML) Revolutionary Initiative and Communist Party of India (Marxist-Leninist) Praja Pantha to create a new party Communist Party of India (Marxist–Leninist) Mass Line.

== History ==
Santosh Rana had broken with Charu Majumdar in 1971, and later joined Singh's group. In 1974 the Chandrapulla Reddy-led Andhra Pradesh Committee of Communist Revolutionaries merged with Singh's CPI(ML).

When the Bihar movement was launched by Jayaprakash Narayan in 1974, Singh's CPI(ML) decided to lend support to it. Narayan had been in contact with Singh since 1968, attempting to persuade him to support non-violent agrarian reform struggles.

On 4 July 1975 the Indian government banned 27 organisations, Singh's CPI(ML) was one of them. Under the Emergency Singh's CPI(ML) formulated a three-tier united front line, calling for the formation of a 'revolutionary united front' (consisting of communist revolutionaries, working towards a unified revolutionary communist party), a 'proletarian united front' based on working class struggles (and which could include the Communist Party of India (Marxist) and the Socialist Unity Centre of India (Communist)) and a 'democratic front' which would unite forces working for restoration of democratic rights. Within the framework of the 'democratic front' work, party cadres began participating in joint protests with non-left opposition groups at the time.

After the defeat of Indira Gandhi in the 1977 Lok Sabha elections, the situation for the party was relaxed somewhat. Singh asserted that although the class character of the new Janata Party government was the same as the Gandhi government, he appreciated differences like improvement of civil liberties and weakening of Soviet influence. On 9 April 1977 S.N. Singh signed an appeal along with Khokan Majumder (Unity Committee, CPI(ML)), Suniti Kumar Ghosh (COC, CPI(ML)) and Apurba Roy (UCCRI(ML)), calling for the unconditional release of 12 000 revolutionary prisoners. During the anti-Emergency struggle, the Janata Party had promised to release political prisoners. Once in power however, they had back-tracked on that promise. Singh was involved in negotiations to secure the release of prisoners.

Singh's CPI(ML) was the first major ML-factions that opened up for participating in elections, which became a controversial issue. On 10 April 1977 Singh declared the willingness to contest elections at a press conference. The Calcutta District committee denounced the move. Other ML-factions saw as the new line as treachery. In 1971 Santosh Rana was elected to the West Bengal state assembly from the Gopiballavpur constituency (one of the areas were CPI(ML) had started armed struggle following the model of the Naxalbari uprising). Rana got 13401 votes (25,67%), which was enough to defeat the CPI(M), Indian National Congress and Janata Party candidates. Singh's CPI(ML) were also able to register the party name Communist Party of India (Marxist-Leninist) with the Election Commission of India, but the registration was later lost.

== Post-1984 period ==
Around 1980 Singh's group appeared as the strongest ML-faction, but with the exit of Chandrapulla Reddy and other splits the party shrunk. In 1984 a severe split occurred, with the loyalists of Singh opposed to the group of Santosh Rana and Vaskar Nandy. The Singh faction levelled the following accusation: "In our organisation also, Nandy’s close associates established contacts with a foreign voluntary agency and a native voluntary agency financed by Western monopoly capital, keeping it secret from the POC and the general secretary of the party, S N Singh. They established contact with Rural Aid Consortium of Tagore Society which is financed by West European countries and the USA and with one Danish Organisation on the Plea of providing relief to the people of Gobiballabpur in West Bengal and some areas in Bihar. Lakhs of rupees were received for digging tanks, constructing school building opening a sewing training center and distributing chickens and cattle to the needy. It also came to our notice that money was being received by some of our leaders from the Lutheran Church. When it came to light to the PCC members, an intense ideological struggle burst forth in the party on this issue." (Our differences with Nandy-Rana group, PCC-CPI(ML), p. 29)

The group of Rana came to win a majority in the leadership (the provisional central committee) and Singh's followers formed a new committee (and de facto a new party). Singh died shortly afterwards.

Rana's group differentiates themselves from other ML-factions through their emphasis on antifascism. Rana considers the Hindu nationalist Bharatiya Janata Party (BJP) as a fascist danger for India. PCC, CPI(ML) gives the advice to their followers to vote for parties like CPI(M) or even the Indian National Congress in constituencies were no revolutionary communist candidate is available.

Ahead of the 2004 Lok Sabha elections the party participated in the united front of revolutionary communists initiated by Communist Party of India (Marxist-Leninist) Red Flag and Communist Party of India (Marxist-Leninist).

In the Bodo-dominated areas in Assam, the party works through a mass organization called United Reservation Movement Council of Assam. PCC, CPI(ML) and URMCA are opponents of the Bodo nationalist movements. In the Lok Sabha elections in 2004 the URMCA candidate in Kokrajhar got 205 491 votes (21,25%). In the 1999 election the URMCA candidate had gotten 246 942 votes (27,75%) in the same constituency.

PCC, CPI(ML) publishes For a New Democracy as its central organ. The editor-in-chief is Vaskar Nandy.

== See also ==
- List of anti-revisionist groups
- List of Naxalite and Maoist groups in India
