= Unity Centre of Communist Revolutionaries of India (Marxist–Leninist) (Anand) =

Unity Centre of Communist Revolutionaries of India (Marxist–Leninist) (Anand) was a splinter faction of Unity Centre of Communist Revolutionaries of India (Marxist–Leninist).

The party later merged with Centre of Communist Revolutionaries of India.
