= Suniti Kumar Ghosh =

Indian politician

- সুনীতি কুমার ঘোষ

Personal details
- Born: 1918 Shibpur, Howrah district, Bengal Presidency, British Raj
- Died: 11 May 2014 (aged 95–96)
- Party: Communist Party of India; Communist Party of India (Marxist-Leninist)

Suniti Kumar Ghosh(Bengali: সুনীতি কুমার ঘোষ;1918 – 11 May 2014) was an Indian Marxist-Leninist revolutionary, writer, and editor. He was one of the founding members of the Communist Party of India (Marxist-Leninist) and the founding editor of its central organ, Liberation.

== Early life and education ==
Suniti Kumar Ghosh was born in Shibpur, Howrah, West Bengal. He graduated from Ripon College in Kolkata and earned a master's degree in English from the University of Calcutta. He began his career as a teacher at Dinajpur College (now in Bangladesh), where he became closely associated with the Tebhaga struggle in 1946-47 and joined the Communist Party of India (CPI).

== Political career ==
In 1949, Ghosh was externed from East Pakistan (now Bangladesh) and settled in Calcutta. He worked as a lecturer in English at Vidyasagar College, Kolkata. After the formation of the Communist Party of India (Marxist) [CPI(M)], he became an important organizer of the party's lecturers’ cell. Ghosh, known as Comrade SKG within the party, fully immersed himself in revolutionary political activities during the Naxalbari uprising.

== Role in CPI(ML) ==
Ghosh was a member of the All India Coordination Committee of Communist Revolutionaries (AICCCR) and the Central Committee of the Communist Party of India (Marxist-Leninist) [CPI(ML)] from their inception. Under his editorship, Liberation began publication in November 1967, becoming the organ of AICCCR in May 1968 and later the central organ of CPI(ML) from April 1969. Liberation played a crucial role in revolutionary journalism and party building during this period.

== Later years and writings ==
After the revolutionary communist movement faced setbacks around 1972, Ghosh focused on writing books and articles with revolutionary fervor and theoretical rigor. His notable works include:

- The Indian Big Bourgeoisie: Its Genesis, Growth and Character
- India and the Raj 1919-1947: Glory, Shame and Bondage (in two volumes)
- Imperialism’s Tightening Grip on Indian Agriculture
- The Indian Constitution and Its Review
- Development Planning in India: Lumpen-development and Imperialism
- The Himalayan Adventure: India-China War of 1962 — Causes and Consequences
- The Tragedy of Partition of Bengal
- India’s Nationality Problem and Ruling Classes

He also edited The Historic Turning Point: A Liberation Anthology (in two volumes) and wrote several books in Bengali, such as Bharater Communist Party (Marxbadi) – Ekti Mulyayan and Phire Dekha. His last major work, Naxalbari: Before and After, Reminiscences and Appraisal, was published in 2009.

== Legacy ==
Suniti Kumar Ghosh continued his intellectual and revolutionary work until the age of 92. His unwavering revolutionary zeal and contributions to Marxist theory and practice remain a source of inspiration. He died in Asansol, West Bengal on 11 May 2014, at the age of 96.
