= Unity Centre of Communist Revolutionaries of India (Marxist–Leninist) Subodh Mitra =

Unity Centre of Communist Revolutionaries of India (Marxist–Leninist) (Subodh Mitra) was a splinter faction of Unity Centre of Communist Revolutionaries of India (Marxist–Leninist). The party was led by Subodh Mitra.

The party later merged with Communist Organisation of India (Marxist-Leninist).
