= Catre =

Ancient town in Crete

Coordinates: 35°16′47″N 23°42′25″E

Catre or Katre (Ancient Greek: Κάτρη) was an ancient town in Crete. It is tentatively located near modern Prophitis Ilias, Kadros.
