= Trade Union Centre of India =

Trade union in India

Trade Union Centre of India is a national central trade union organization in India. It is linked to the Communist Party of India (Marxist–Leninist) Red Star. Initially it was founded as the trade union wing of Communist Party of India (Marxist-Leninist) Red Flag.

The 5th All India Conference of TUCI was held in Mumbai 15–17 October 2007. The conference elected a 42-member National Council, a 13-member Central Committee and 7 office-bearers: are in the Central Committee, of whom the seven office-bearers are: Bharat Bhushan Pandey (Chhattisgarh), president, Amrish Patel (Gujarat), vice-president, Sivaraman (Kerala), vice-president, Sanjay Singhvi (Maharashtra), general secretary, T.C. Subramanian (Kerala), secretary, D.H. Poojar (Karnataka), secretary and Pratap Harmalkar (Maharashtra), treasurer.
