= École nationale supérieure de chimie, de biologie et de physique =

French engineering college

Coordinates: 44°48′05″N 0°36′40″W

The École Nationale Supérieure de Chimie et de Physique de Bordeaux or ENSCPB (or "CPB" in common parlance) - which can be translated as Graduate School of Chemistry and Physics of Bordeaux - is one of the French "grandes écoles", whose main purpose is to form chemical and physical engineers (with a level "bac+5"). It is located on the campus of the University of Bordeaux 1, in the town of Pessac, close to the famous city of Bordeaux.

In 2009, the school merged with the "Institut des sciences et techniques des aliments de Bordeaux" (or "ISTAB") and is now called "Ecole Nationale Supérieure de Chimie, de Biologie et de Physique" (or ENSCBP). Different schooling are proposed in the school, the two biggest being the engineering programs in Chemistry and Physics (or "Formation CP") and in Food Science (or "Formation BA"). The students mostly go abroad for at least 5 months during their 3-year study program, and obtain an Engineering School Diploma, equivalent of a master's degree in Engineering.
