= Maoist Communist Centre of India =

Communist party faction

Maoist Communist Centre
- Founded: 1975; 51 years ago
- Dissolved: 2004; 22 years ago
- Merged into: Communist Party of India (Maoist)
- Ideology: Communism; Marxism–Leninism–Maoism
- Political position: Far-left

The Maoist Communist Centre (MCC) was one of the largest two armed Maoist groups in India, and merged with the other, the People's War Group in September 2004, to form the Communist Party of India (Maoist).

== Dakshin Desh ==
When the Communist Party of India (Marxist-Leninist) was founded in 1969, rallying various Maoist tendencies into a unified organisation, some groups retained a separate identity and remained outside of CPI(ML). One such group was nicknamed Dakshin Desh, after the name of its publication. The group had begun publishing Dakshin Desh in along Maoist lines. The group was joined by a sector of trade union activists.

Dakshin Desh is Hindi for 'Southern Land' (implied in this naming was that India was the 'Southern land' whereas China was the corresponding 'Northern land'). Amulaya Sen and Kanai Chatterjee were the leading figures of the Dakshin Desh-group. In difference to CPI(ML), whose policies of armed struggle bordered individual terrorism, the Dakshin Desh-group upheld that mass mobilisations were requisites for engaging in armed struggle. The group began armed activities in the Jangal Mahal area, Burdwan district, West Bengal, where Dalits and Adivasis constituted large sections of the local population. The territory was covered with deep forests, considered ideal for guerrilla warfare. The group formed political militia squads, which moved around in the villages and conducted political activities to mobilise local peasants. The squads were often made up by recruits from Calcutta. The squads looted grain storages, captured firearms and assassinated landlords and perceived police informers. By 1973 it was estimated that the group had 37 squads in the area, with a combined membership of 106.

== MCC ==
In 1975 the group took the name Maoist Communist Centre. However, in spite of several years of political and armed activities, the group failed to make a breakthrough in the Jangal Mahal area. In 1976 it decided to expand its activities to other parts of the country. Soon it began activities in eastern Bihar, and for this purpose an apex Bengal-Bihar Special Area Committee was set up by the MCC.

Chatterji died in 1982. Following his death, MCC was riddled by internal divisions. Chatterji's successor, Siveji, and his deputy, Ramadhar Singh, disagreed over the policy of individual annihilations. Singh broke away and joined Kanu Sanyal's group instead. In the mid- and late 1980, leadership of MCC was taken over by Sanjay Dusadh and Pramod Mishra. At this point, the influence of the group had spread to the central parts of Bihar. The group now counted with 500 wholetime cadres and 10 000 members. Mass organisations of MCC included Krantikari Kisan Committee (Revolutionary Peasants Committee), Jana Suraksha Sangarsh Manch (People's Defence Struggle Bloc), Krantikarai Buddhijevi Sangh and Krantikari Chhatra League (Revolutionary Students League). The armed wing of the party was called Lal Raskha Dal (Red Defence Force).

In rural Bihar the party had become a major force to reckon with in some areas under leadership of Sushil Roy alias Som. In the pockets of its influence the party ran a parallel juridical system, with a system of people's courts. The expansion of the party occurred as it became one of several caste-based armed groups in the area. The party mobilised lower-caste Biharis, and frequently clashed with various militia groups defending upper-caste interests. At times it also clashed with other Naxalite groups, such as when MCC militia killed 5 Communist Party of India (Marxist-Leninist) Liberation members in Jehanabad district on 4 April 1994. Militia activities of MCC reached its peak by 1990.

In September 1993, MCC, Communist Party of India (Marxist-Leninist) People's War and Communist Party of India (Marxist-Leninist) Party Unity decided to coordinate their struggles. As a result, the All India People's Resistance Forum was formed, with the participation of cadres from the three parties. AIPRF held a mass rally, with around 100 000 participants, on 21 March 1994.

== Mergers with RCCI (M) and 2nd CC ==
In January 2003 the MCC and the Punjab-based Revolutionary Communist Centre of India (Maoist) led by Shamsher Singh Sheri merged. The unified organisation was renamed Maoist Communist Centre of India. On 19 May 2003 Communist Party of India (Marxist-Leninist) Second Central Committee merged with MCCI led by Prashant Bose. CPI(ML) 2nd CC had to withdraw its pro-Lin Biao stand for the merger to go through.

== See also ==
- List of Naxalite and Maoist groups in India
