= Koora Rajanna =

Indian politician

Koora Rajanna is an Indian communist politician. He is the former secretary of the Communist Party of India (Marxist-Leninist) Janashakti Andhra Pradesh unit.

== Early life ==
He was born in Vemulawada village of Karimnagar district in Andhra Pradesh. He studied in Vemulawada till his tenth class and higher education in Hyderabad. In Hyderabad, Rajanna became a member of the Progressive Democratic Students Union, student wing of the Communist Party of India (Marxist-Leninist).

Later he became a full-time worker of the party and was forced to go underground when the police cracked down on the movement. Kura Rajaiah alias Rajanna, a native of Boinwada in Vemulawada temple town, is an engineering graduate from Osmania University. He joined the Naxalite movement in 1974 and later founded the Rajanna faction of CPI-ML (Janashakti). He was arrested in September 2006 near a village at Lucknow in Uttar Pradesh. His wife, Rangavalli who herself a leader in the party cadre, died in an encounter on 11 November 1999. Amar alias Kura Devender, state committee secretary, who represented Janashakti in the abortive peace talks with the Andhra Pradesh government in October 2004, is the brother of Rajanna.

During his three-decade long underground life, Rajanna was never arrested by the police.

He was an accused in several cases of murder, extortion, arson and kidnapping. He was also instrumental in supplying arms and ammunition to the erstwhile People's War Group.
