= Communist Party of Indian Union (Marxist–Leninist) =

Indian political party

Communist Party of Indian Union (Marxist–Leninist) was an Indian political party. CPIU (ML) traced its origins to a small group that broke away from the Communist Organization of India (Marxist-Leninist) of Kanu Sanyal and joined Marxist Communist Party of India. The merger between CPIU and MCPI took place at a conference in Chandigarh on 11 September 1998. At the time of the merger, the general secretary of CPIU was U. Krishanuppa from Karnataka.

Later, CPIU (ML) broke away from MCPI. CPIU (ML) was mainly based in Bihar and West Bengal.

In August 2003 discussions took place between Kanu Sanyal and Arvind Sinha from CPI (ML) and Subodh Mitra and S.D. Bose about a possible merger between CPIU (ML) and CPI (ML). The conference of CPIU (ML) in Samastipur 18 November 2003 confirmed the merger plans, and CPIU (ML) joined the CPI (ML) of Sanyal.
