= Communist Party of India (Marxist–Leninist) (Mahadev Mukherjee) =

- Leader: Manik
- Founder: Mahadev Mukherjee
- Founded: 6 December 1972
- Split from: Communist Party of India (Marxist–Leninist)
- Ideology: Communism; Marxism–Leninism; Stalinism; Maoism; Anti-revisionism
- Political position: Far-left
- Colours: Red

Party flag

Website
- https://cpindiaml.wordpress.com

Communist Party of India (Marxist-Leninist) is an anti-revisionist Marxist–Leninist communist party in India. After the death of Charu Majumdar in 1972 the Communist Party of India (Marxist–Leninist) pro Charu Majumdar central committee was led by Mahadev Mukherjee and Jagjit Singh Sohal, and the Central Committee took a stand to defend the line of Charu Majumdar on 5–6 December 1972.

The pro Charu Majumdar CPI (M-L) soon faced a split on the question of Lin Biao and the 10th National Congress of the Chinese Communist Party, the faction led by Jauhar, Vinod Mishra and Swadesh Bhattacharya parted way from the party by opposing the line of the Central Committee and founded the Communist Party of India (Marxist-Leninist) Liberation in 1973 which became the pro Charu Majumdar and anti Lin Biao faction. The pro Charu Majumdar and pro Lin Biao faction of the CPI (M-L) was led by Mahadev Mukherjee and this faction organized massive armed assaults on government and rich peasantry in West Bengal, However, their attempt of reviving the revolutionary terrorist line of Charu Majumdar did not last long due to police repression. The pro Lin Biao faction led by Mahadev Mukherjee held the 2nd Congress of the CPI (M-L) in December 1973 in Kamalpur, Burdwan district of West Bengal and soon Kamalpur became a centre of armed guerrilla activity. The armed clashes between government and CPI (M-L) supporter guerrillas in Kamalpur led to a division in the Central Committee with one section attempting to purge Mahadev and his supporters in Deganga session of the Central Committee. The division led to the arrest of Mahadev Mukherjee from Shillong. Later in late 70's the Communist Party of India (Marxist-Leninist) Second Central Committee was formed by Azizul Haque and Nishit Bhattacharya after a split from the Mahadev Mukherjee led Central Committee.

Still today the CPI (M-L) Mahadev Mukherjee holds the sectarian political line of Charu Majumdar and Lin Biao.

The CPI (M-L) Mahadev Mukherjee has organizational presence in Bihar, Andhra Pradesh, the Andaman and Nicobar Islands, West Bengal, New Delhi and Tamil Nadu. The party calls for boycott of parliamentary polls, and urges for armed struggle. The party does not carry out open works and is an underground party. It holds rallies and mass meetings in Naxalbari and Siliguri region of West Bengal only. The party organized a mass rally at Naxalbari on 25 May 2006 in the presence of Mahadev Mukherjee. In Siliguri, the party launches a one-day general strike every year in July, to commemorate the killing of Charu Majumdar.

On 28 July 2009 a DYFI leader in North Bengal ended up dead in a clash against the CPI (M-L) Mahadev Mukherjee supporters during such annual strike As per the statements in the party website after the death of Mahadev Mukherjee in 2009 the party is led by a peasant leader Manik.

== See also ==
- List of anti-revisionist groups
