= Marxist–Leninist Party of India (Red Flag) =

Marxist Leninist Party of India (Red Flag)
- Abbreviation: MLPI (Red Flag)
- General Secretary: M.S. Jayakumar
- Founded: 2003
- Split from: CPIML Red Flag
- Headquarters: Cochin, Kerala
- Newspaper: Comrade
- Youth wing: Revolutionary Youth Organization
- Labour wing: TUCI (Red Flag)
- Ideology: Communism; Marxism–Leninism
- Political position: Left-wing
- Colours: Red
- ECI status: Registered-Unrecognized

Website
- mlpiredflag.org

The Marxist–Leninist Party of India (Red Flag), previously the CPI(ML) Red Flag is a communist party in India. The party is one of the most moderate factions of the wider Naxalite movement.

As of 2019, key leaders of the party were M.S. Jayakumar, All India general secretary, and P.C. Unnichekkan, the Kerala State Committee secretary. Yuvajana Vedi is the youth wing of the party.

== History ==
=== 2003 split ===
The party emerged from a split in the erstwhile Communist Party of India (Marxist–Leninist) Red Flag (led by K.N. Ramachandran) in 2003. The Unnichekkan faction opposed the merger of CPI (ML) Red Flag with Kanu Sanyal's Communist Party of India (Marxist–Leninist) Class Struggle. Another issue of disagreement was the question of participation in the World Social Forum, which the Unnichekkan group opposed. The question on the approach to Stalin was another key point of disagreement among the two factions at that time.

The Unnichekkan faction organised a national conference of their own at the Nayanthahalli Nityananda Dhana Mandiram in Bangalore on 20–21 December 2003, electing a party Central Committee consisting of M.S. Jayakumar (All India Secretary), Ayyappa Hugar (Karnataka), K. Chandrasekharan (Maharashtra), L. Govindaswami (Tamil Nadu), M.M. Somasekharan (Kerala), P.C. Unnichekkan (Kerala) and P.J. Baby (Kerala) since they were prevented to enter the Sixth All India Conference venue of Communist Party of India (Marxist–Leninist) Red Flag being held in the same city.

=== 2004 Lok Sabha election ===
The party had two candidates in the 2004 parliamentary election, both contesting as independents. T.B. Mini, a member of the Kerala State Committee of the party, contested the Ernakulam Lok Sabha seat, getting 7,482 votes (1.6% of the valid votes in that constituency). K.T. Kunhikannan, a Kerala State Secretariat member of the party, contested the Vatakara seat, getting 10,418 votes (0.9%).

=== 2006 anti-reservation protests ===
The party opposed the 2006 protests against quotas for backward classes in higher education, claiming that the protestors represented a segment of the rich urban elite. The party called for nationwide agitations to support the introduction of reservations for backward classes in the educational system.

=== 2008 split ===
In March 2008, K.T. Kunhikannan and his followers were expelled from the party for having sought closer relations with the Communist Party of India (Marxist). Kunhikannan then organized his own CPI (ML) Red Flag. In April 2008, Kunhikannan's faction merged into CPI(M).

=== 2009 election ===
Ahead of the 2009 parliamentary election, the party declared its support for the candidates of the Left Democratic Front, for the sake of securing victory of secular forces. Unnichekkan motivated this position stating dissatisfaction with the foreign policies of both the National Democratic Alliance and the United Progressive Alliance (the two main political blocs at the national level), claiming that both groups sought to align India with Israel.

=== 2013 ===
In 2013 8th all India conference of CPIML (Red Flag) was convened in Mumbai. In this conference it was decided to fight uncompromisingly against LPG (liberalization, privatization and globalization) policies. For the completion of this task tactical approach of 'left unity' was also placed before.

=== 2019 election ===
The party registered itself with the Election Commission of India as the 'Marxist–Leninist Party of India (Red Flag)' in 2017. The party contested three seats in the 2019 Indian general election; Shankar Badade in Palghar (11,917 votes), B.Basavalingappa in Koppal (1,609 votes) and Vilas Hiwale in Mumbai North (489 votes).

=== 2020 Kerala local body elections ===
The party gained 2,055 votes and one seat in Eloor Municipality.
