= Communist Party of India (Marxist–Leninist) Bolshevik =

Communist Party of India (Marxist–Leninist) Bolshevik was a small communist party in India. It was formed by Jayshree Rana, who broke with her husband's (Santosh Rana) CPI (ML) after they had decided to run in elections in mid 1977.
