= Central Reorganisation Committee, Communist Party of India (Marxist–Leninist) =

The Central Reorganisation Committee, Communist Party of India (Marxist–Leninist) was a communist group in India 1979–1991. The Secretary of the All-India Leading Committee of the CRC, CPI(ML) was K. Venu. The main organ of CRC, CPI(ML) was called Mass Line. CRC, CPI(ML) also published Liberation and Comrade.

CRC, CPI(ML) emerged from the pro-Charu Majumdar tendency of the Naxalite movement. It had its main roots in the Kerala State Committee of the Communist Party of India (Marxist-Leninist) (CPI(ML)). However, the KSC differed from the original CPI(ML) by advocating a mass line.

In 1982 the First All India Conference of CRC, CPI(ML) was held. The second conference was held in 1987.

In 1984 CRC, CPI(ML) was one of the three founders of the Revolutionary Internationalist Movement (the others being Revolutionary Communist Party (USA) and Communist Party of Peru).

In 1987 CRC, CPI(ML) suffered a major setback when a major portion of the organisation broke away and formed CPI (ML) Red Flag.

In October 1991 CRC, CPI(ML) was dissolved. K. Venu renounced Maoism and declared an all-India communist party as an impossibility. Groups dissatisfied with the dissolution formed the Maharashtra Communist Party and Kerala Communist Party. MCP and KCP later merged to form the Maoist Unity Centre, Communist Party of India (Marxist-Leninist). MUC, CPI(ML) later merged with CPI(ML) Naxalbari.

K. Venu later joined the Janathipathiya Samrakshana Samithy. He contested the 1996 Kerala assembly elections from Kondugallur. Venu came second with 37,234 votes.

== See also ==
- Janakiya Samskarika Vedi
