= Lal Nishan Party =

Left wing political party in India from 1980-2018

- Founded: 1965
- Dissolved: August 2017
- Split from: CPI (1965)
- Merged into: CPI (2018)
- Succeeded by: LNP(L) (1988)
- Headquarters: Nagpur, Maharashtra
- Ideology: Communism; Marxism–Leninism
- Political position: Left-wing
- Colours: Red

Lal Nishan Party (Red Flag Party, LNP) was a communist political party in the Indian state of Maharashtra. It was founded in 1965. The LNP's main work was trade union activism. The trade union of the party was called Sarva Shramik Sangh (SSS). The party publication was called Nave Parva. Earlier, SSS published a Marathi daily newspaper from Pune called Shramik Vichar. During the 1980s, the LNP developed a close cooperation with Kamgar Aghadi.

In 1988, a split occurred when a hardline section, critical of the Perestroika, broke away and formed the Lal Nishan Party (Leninvadi). The LNP participated in the Confederation of Indian Communists and Democratic Socialists. In 2017 August, the LNP merged with the Communist Party of India.
