= Communist Party of India (Marxist–Leninist) Praja Pantha =

- Founded: 1984 (first foundation); 2022 (second foundation)
- Merged into: Communist Party of India (Marxist–Leninist) New Democracy (1994); Communist Party of India (Marxist–Leninist) Mass Line (2024)
- Newspaper: Praja Pantha
- Ideology: Communism; Marxism–Leninism; Mao Zedong Thought; Naxalism
- Political position: Far-left
- International affiliation: ICOR
- Colours: Red

Communist Party of India (Marxist–Leninist) Praja Pantha (Note: "Praja Pantha" (also alternately romanized as "Praja Pandha") means "People's Line" or (officially) "Mass Line".) (Telugu: కమ్యూనిస్టు పార్టీ ఆఫ్ ఇండియా (మార్క్సిస్ట్-లెనినిస్ట్) ప్రజాపంథా); (abbreviated as CPI(M–L)PP; Telugu: సీపీఐ (ఎంఎల్‌) ప్రజాపంథా), was a Marxist–Leninist Naxalite party in India, originally founded in 1984 and refounded in 2022, and united with three other groups in 2024.

== History ==
=== First foundation ===
CPI (M-L) Praja Pantha was originally founded in 1984 by Pyla and Madala who were members of the Communist Party of India (Marxist–Leninist) (Chandra Pulla Reddy). According to Chandra Pulla Reddy the reason for the split was their differences with the CC's understanding of united front, "resistance" slogan, their claimed ties to earlier splinters, and their claimed discipline issues. Through its existence it had several problems with other Naxalites parties too, like the Communist Party of India (Marxist-Leninist) People's War, which resulted in deaths. This group became Communist Party of India (Marxist–Leninist) New Democracy in 1994.

=== Second iteration ===
CPI (M-L) ND Telangana State Committee members who were disillusioned with the CC distanced themselves from the party, and declared themselves as CPI (M-L) Praja Pantha on February 22, 2022. According to the splinter group, CPI (M-L) ND failed to corrected its extremist line, thus alienating the party from people. On March 5, 2024, CPI (M-L) Praja Pantha, CPI (M-L) Revolutionary Initiative and PCC, CPI (M-L) united, forming the Communist Party of India (Marxist–Leninist) Mass Line (Telugu: సీపీఐ (ఎంఎల్‌) మాస్‌లైన్‌). (Note: Official name of the party is Mass Lain, which is a loan of Mass Line to Telugu. However, it's still called Praja Pandha (officially preferred romanization) in Telugu.)

== See also ==
- List of Naxalite and Maoist groups in India
