= Satyanarayan Singh (Bihar politician, died 1984) =

Indian communist politician

Satyanarayan Singh (Hindi: सत्यनारायण सिंह, commonly known as SNS) was an Indian communist politician. Singh was one of the early leaders of the Communist Party of India (Marxist-Leninist), being its secretary in Bihar.

Satyanarayan Singh hailed from Bhojpur, Bihar. As of 1948 Singh was an underground cadre of the Communist Party of India.

== Political life ==
Singh supported the line of annihilations of class enemies of Charu Majumdar, and implemented it to a certain degree in Musahari and other areas in Bihar. However he disagreed with Majumdar on the issue of killing rich peasants. In 1968-1969 the Musahari Naxalite movement grew from seizures of food crops to guerrilla struggle and killings of landlords. By May 1969 the movement encompassed 50,000 people. As of 1969 Singh argued that rejection of the annihilation line meant advocating co-existence between landlords and the village peasantry. Singh recorded his analysis of this phase of struggle in the document Musahari and its lessons.

Singh emerged as the leader of dissent inside the party against the party general secretary Majumdar. By July 1970 he had rejected Majumdar's policy on annihilation as 'individual terrorism'. In September 1970 Singh charged the CPI(ML) Central Committee with following a left sectarian line. Singh led the revolt against Majumdar inside the CPI(ML), setting up a parallel Central Committee. In November 1971 the new Central Committee officially declared Majumdar expelled from the party for having adopted a 'Trotskyist adventurist line' and elected Singh as the new general secretary. His party would be known as the Provisional Central Committee, Communist Party of India (Marxist-Leninist), and would reject Majumdar's annihilation line.

Singh's CPI(ML) supported the anti-Emergency struggle launched by Jayaprakash Narayan in 1974. Singh's CPI(ML) opposed the Gang of Four and gave support to Hua Guofeng's leadership as Chairman of the Chinese Communist Party.

With the lifting of the Emergency in 1977 Singh began to favour a more conciliatory approach to the state, for example negotiating for the release of prisoners. In the same year Singh's CPI(ML) decided to participate in elections for the first time. Singh's CPI(ML) presented three candidates in West Bengal, one in Bihar and one in Punjab. For the Andhra Pradesh legislative assembly election, Singh toured ten constituencies during the electoral campaign.

Satyanarayan Singh died in a cardiac attack in 1984. A few months before his death, his party had split with most of the Provisional Central Committee members siding with Vaskar Nandy.

== See also ==
- Jagdish Mahto
