= P. C. Unnichekkan =

Indian politician

P. C. Unnichekkan is a communist politician from Kerala, India. He is the Kerala State Secretary of the Marxist-Leninist Party of India (Red Flag).
