= Communist Party of India (Marxist–Leninist) New Initiative =

Communist Party of India (Marxist–Leninist) New Initiative was an India political party. It merged with CPI (ML) Janashakti COC to form CPI (ML) Unity Initiative. CPI (ML) New Initiative was led by Arvind Sinha.
