= Communist Party of India (Marxist–Leninist) Red Flag =

Communist party faction

Communist Party of India (Marxist–Leninist) Red Flag (CPI(ML) Red Flag) was a political party in India (1988-2005).

The party emerged in 1988, following a split in the K. Venu-led Central Reorganisation Committee, CPI(ML) in the wake of the 1987 second conference of CRC, CPI(ML) as a large section of the latter organisation in Kerala broke away and formed its own party. The Andhra Pradesh-based group of Raouf (which had been part of the CRC, CPI(ML) as well) joined the CPI(ML) Red Flag. CPI(ML) Red Flag differed from other ML factions by claiming that India was a 'neo-colony'. It upheld Marxism-Leninism Mao Tse-Tung Thought as its ideological line, and rejected the term 'Maoism' whilst they also rejected the Three Worlds Theory. In contrast to K. Venu, CPI(ML) Red Flag upheld the concept of the dictatorship of the proletariat rather than K. Venu's concept on the national question. The party argued that armed struggle required to be substantiated by mass organizations. In its early phase (1988-1992) the CPI(ML) Red Flag sought to promote unity among communist revolutionary groups, and organized seminars and published open theoretical journals on Leninist polemics. Eventually the party exited its underground existence and began operating openly.

The CPI(ML) Red Flag main base of support was in Kerala, where it emerged as the major ML faction. It also expanded to other states including Karnataka, Madhya Pradesh, Maharashtra, Chhattisgarh, West Bengal and Odisha. The party head office was located in Delhi.

CPI (ML) Red Flag poster in Kerala

The first All India Secretary of the party was Arup Majumdar, followed by K.N. Ramachandran, Souren Bose was one top leader from the original CPI (ML) to have joined this party. Bose became the West Bengal State Committee of CPI(ML) Red Flag. He died in 1997 while on a party tour in Mumbai.

The main mass organisation of the party was the Trade Union Centre of India (TUCI). Regional mass organisations of the party included Yuvajanavedi, Kerala Vidyarthi Sanghatana (Kerala Students Organisation, a student's wing) and Janakeeya Kala Sahitya Vedi (a cultural front) in Kerala, and Adivasi Democratic Front in Madhya Pradesh. CPI(ML) Red Flag published Red Star (English), Iykya Horatta (Kannada) and Saghavu (Malayalam).

== 2003 split ==
In 2003 a large section of the party in Kerala, including the majority in the Kerala State Committee, broke away, and created a parallel CPI(ML) Red Flag. The split was led by the Kerala state secretary of the party, P.C. Unnichekkan. That party continued to use the name CPI(ML) Red Flag and supported Left Democratic Front in Kerala.

== Unification with Sanyal group ==
Ahead of the Lok Sabha elections in 2004 the K.N. Ramachandran-led CPI(ML) Red Flag and CPI (ML) took the initiative to form a united front of revolutionary communists. In that front they were able to gather, more than CPI (ML) and CPI (ML) Red Flag, Centre of Communist Revolutionaries (West Bengal), Lal Nishan Party (Leninvadi), Marxist Communist Party of India, Marxist-Leninist Committee, New Socialist Movement, Gujarat, Provisional Central Committee, Communist Party of India (Marxist-Leninist) and Bhagat Singh Vichar Manch.

In Kerala a Left Front was formed ahead of the elections together with BTR-EMS-AKG Janakeeya Samskarika Vedi of V.B. Cheriyan.

CPI (ML) Red Flag merged with Kanu Sanyal's Communist Party of India (Marxist-Leninist) at a unity conference in Vijayawada January 2005

== See also ==
- Category:Mass organisations of CPI(ML) Red Flag
- List of Naxalite and Maoist groups in India
