= Communist Party of India (Marxist–Leninist) Second Central Committee =

Communist political group in India

Communist Party of India (Marxist-Leninist) Second Central Committee or CPI (M-L) 2nd CC is a political party in India. It emerged in 1973 when the pro-Charu Majumdar faction of the original CPI (M-L) got divided into pro and anti-Lin Piao groups. The CPI (M-L) 2nd CC represents the pro-Lin Piao stream. At present, the party is active in states like Bihar, Uttar Pradesh and West Bengal.

== History ==
The undivided CPI (M-L), the mother organization of CPI (M-L) 2nd CC, was formed in 1969 by the All India Coordination Committee of Communist Revolutionaries, which had actually split from the Communist Party of India (Marxist) in 1967 after a protracted course of inner-party struggle against revisionist and neo-revisionist deviations. The CPI (M-L), led by radical Communist leaders like Charu Majumdar, Saroj Dutta, Jagjit Singh Sohal and others, advocated armed struggle against parliamentary elections. They categorised India as a semi-feudal, semi-colonial state led by the comprador bourgeoisie and the feudal class under the dictates of imperialism and social-imperialism. From 1969 to 1972, the party fought the Indian state tirelessly by taking to the path of ‘protracted people’s war’ of Mao Zedong and built up the struggles of Srikakulam, Kheri-Lakhimpur, Mushahari, Debra-Gopiballabhpur etc. In 1970 it organised its First Party Congress in Calcutta, West Bengal.

The CPI (M-L), however, could not continue with the struggle it had launched against the state and its alleged agents. After its general secretary's (Charu Majumdar) death on 28 July 1972 at Lal Bazar Police Custody in Calcutta, it got divided into different factions, one of which was pro-Charu Majumdar by nature. In 1973, after the 10th Congress of the Chinese Communist Party, the pro-Charu Majumdar CPI (M-L) became further divided into two groups, namely pro and anti-Lin Piao factions. Mahadev Mukherjee was the leader of the pro-Lin Piao group.

The pro-Lin Piao faction organized its 'Second Party Congress' in December 1973 at Kamalpur, a Naxalite bastion in Hooghly-Burdwan district frontier. The Congress reaffirmed the programme of the undivided CPI (M-L), adopted at the first party congress in 1970, and paid red salutes to Lin Piao and Charu Majumdar. As soon as the Congress was over, the party launched a wave of weapon snatches, attacks on police, prison escapes and annihilation campaigns. By 1973-74 10 policemen in West Bengal were killed by the party and there were 39 incidents of gun snatching. But when the state machinery came down on the revolutionaries heavily, the party had to face a serious setback. Most of the leaders were either incarcerated or killed. The reorganisation process, therefore, began after August 1977 when the detainees were released.

In September 1978, as a result of the annihilation of a landowner at Manihari in Katihar district of Bihar, the Central Committee got divided between Mahadev Mukherjee and his supporters on the one hand and the hardliner section of the party led by Ajijul Haque and Nishit Bhattacharya on the other. After Mahadev Mukherjee's expulsion Haque and Bhattacharya assumed leadership and reorganised the party. They named it CPI (M-L) 2nd CC as a continuation of the Central Committee that was elected in the Second Party Congress (Kamalpur) in 1973. During Haque and Bhattacharya's tenure, that is between 1978 and 1982, CPI (M-L) 2nd CC formed a provisional revolutionary government in the rural areas of North and South Bengal and in the struggle zones of Bihar. After a series of clashes with the state, both Haque and Bhattacharya were arrested. They were subsequently expelled from the party due to Haque signing a cease fire deal with the government of West Bengal. After their expulsion 2nd CC gradually became a dying force. Despite a number of efforts, the new leadership could not raise the level of struggles. On 19 May 2003 a part of the party merged with the Maoist Communist Centre of India. It had to withdraw its pro-Lin Piao stand for the merger to go through.

== Basic Standpoints ==
The Basic Standpoints of CPI (M-L) 2nd CC are as follows:

- It believes that it is the only genuine heir of the undivided CPI (M-L) that was formed on 22 April 1969 by Charu Majumdar and his comrades.
- It takes Marxism-Leninism-Mao Zedong thought and Charu Mazumdar’s Politics as its theoretical guideline.
- It believes that this is the era of imperialism and proletarian revolution in which imperialism is heading for total collapse and socialism is advancing, despite temporary setbacks, to worldwide victory.
- It maintains that India is a semi-feudal and semi-colonial country based on Neo-colonial nature of exploitation.
- It rejects the parliamentary path for the whole of this strategic period and advocates the path of armed agrarian revolution by waging a successful people’s war—encircling cities with villages as shown by Mao and Lin Piao.

== See also ==
- List of anti-revisionist groups
