= Communist Party of India (Marxist–Leninist) Unity Initiative =

Communist Party of India (Marxist–Leninist) Unity Initiative was a communist party in India. It was led by Viswam.

The CPI (ML) Unity Initiative joined the Six Party Forum, a joint body of Communist Revolutionary organisations formed in 1995.

In 2003, the party merged with the Communist Organisation of India (Marxist-Leninist) (led by Kanu Sanyal), forming a new Communist Party of India (Marxist-Leninist). The merger statement was signed between the two organisations on 17 January 2003.
