= Communist Party of India (Marxist–Leninist) Red Star =

- Abbreviation: CPIML Red Star
- General Secretary: P. J. James
- Founded: 2009 (17 years ago)
- Split from: Communist Party of India (Marxist–Leninist)
- Headquarters: C-141, Sainik Nagar New Delhi-110059, India
- Newspaper: Red Star
- Student wing: All India Revolutionary Students Organisation
- Youth wing: Revolutionary Youth Federation of India
- Women's wing: All India Revolutionary Women Organisation
- Labour wing: Trade Union Centre of India
- Peasant's wing: All India Krantikari Kisan Sabha
- Ideology: Communism; Marxism–Leninism–Maoism
- Political position: Far-left
- International affiliation: ICOR
- ECI status: Registered-Unrecognized

Website
- www.cpiml.in

The Communist Party of India (Marxist–Leninist) Red Star (in brief CPI(ML) Red Star) is a political party in India. Red Star was formed in 2009 merging with various factions of CPI(ML), following the Bhopal Special Conference in 2009 with K N Ramachandran as the General Secretary, who has been reelected to the post in the 9th, 10th and 11th Congresses of the Party, which were held in 2011 at Bhubaneswar (Odisha) in 2015 at Lucknow (Uttar Pradesh) and in 2018 at Bengaluru (Karnataka) respectively.

== History ==
Following the first split in CPI and emergence of CPI (M) in 1964, the inner party struggle continued leading to the Naxalbari Uprising in 1967 and formation of CPI (ML) in 1969 followed by the 1970 Congress (Eighth Congress of the Communist Movement in India).

CPI (ML) Red Star was formed by the merger of various factions of CPI (ML) on 2009 by the 9th Congress at Bhubaneswar. K.N Ramchandran is General Secretary since the very inception of this party. Since 2009 three party congress (9th, 10th, 11th) was held. The last Congress (11th Congress) was held in Bangalore and KN Ramchandran again elected as General Secretary of this party.

52 delegates out of 260 delegates to the 12th Party Congress broke away and organised as CPI (ML) Revolutionary Initiative, as claimed by an Open Letter.

== Role in Bhangar Movement ==
In West Bengal this party gained momentum in participation in Bhangar against an ongoing power station project. Although many of its members were arrested including women-wing leader Sharmishtha Chowdhury the movement still continued. Bhangar protesters led by former Red Star leader Alik Chakraborty won five seats in Polerhat-2 rural poll despite heavy obstacles from the ruling party including blocking nominations and rigging.
