= Communist Party of India (Marxist–Leninist) Class Struggle =

Communist Party of India (Marxist–Leninist)
- Abbreviation: CPIML
- General Secretary: Viswam
- Founded: 2003
- Newspaper: Class Struggle (English)
- Youth wing: Nava Yuva Samaakhya
- Women's wing: Stree Vimukthi Sanghatana
- Labour wing: All India Federation of Trade Unions (New)
- Peasant's wing: All India Kheth Mazdoor Kisan Sabha
- Ideology: Marxism–Leninism
- Political position: Far-left

Website
- classstruggle.in

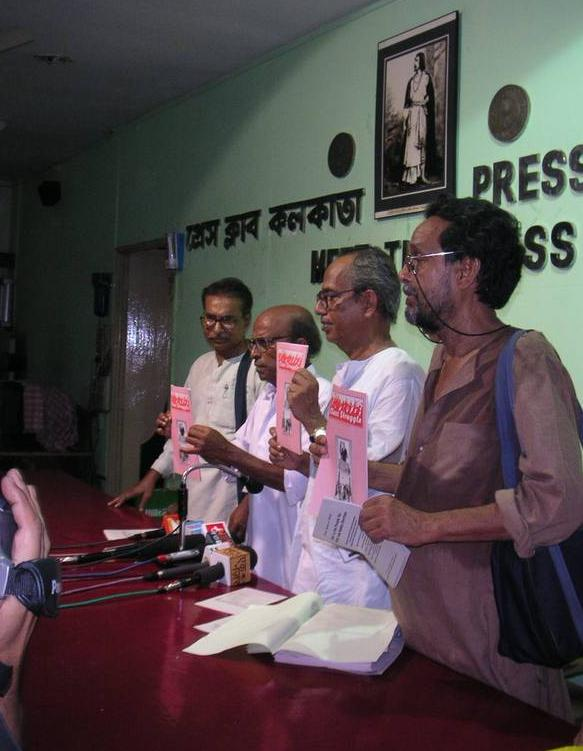
Press conference ahead of the elections 2004

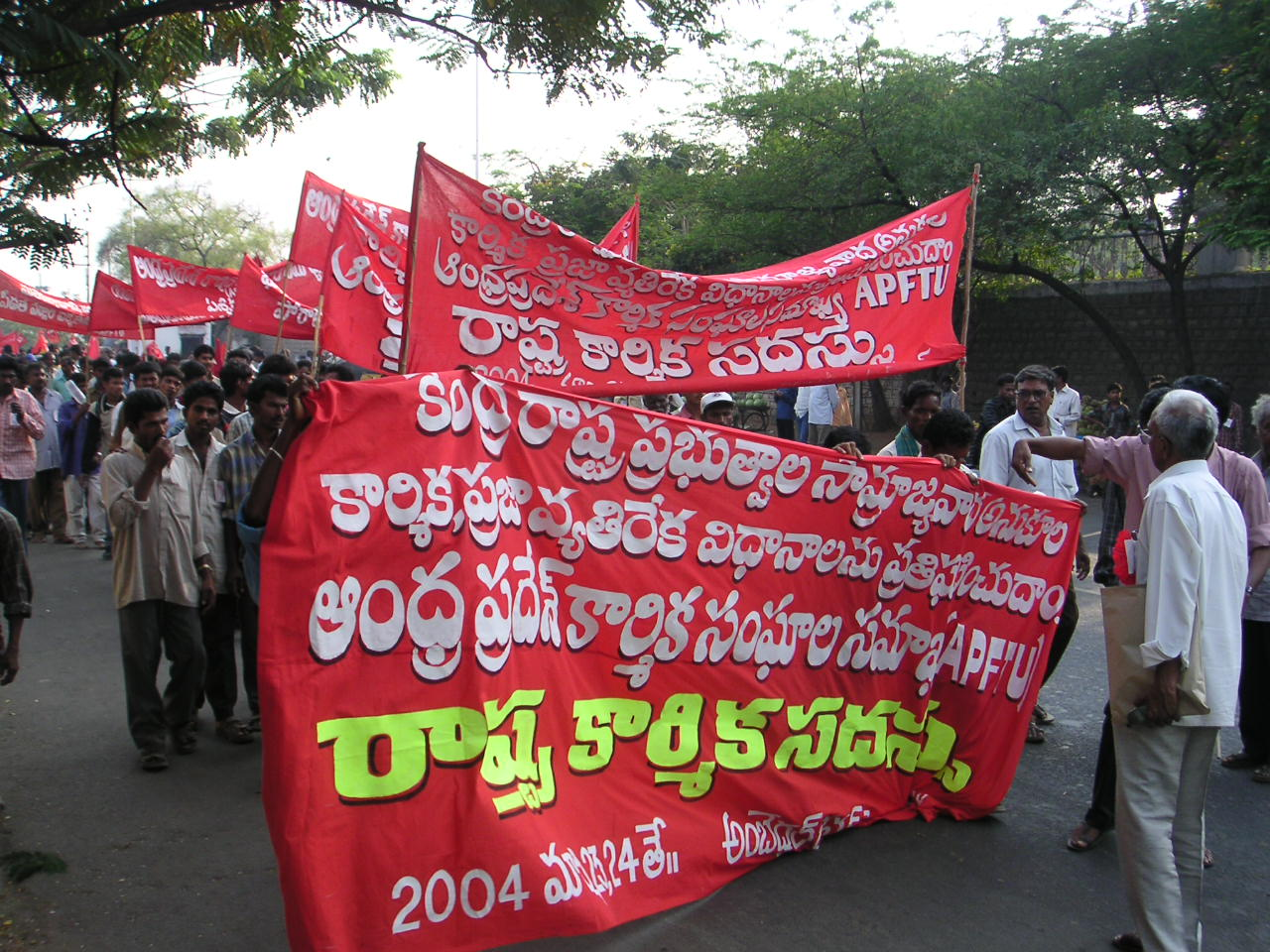
Trade union rally in Hyderabad

Communist Party of India (Marxist–Leninist) is a Marxist-Leninist party in India. The party is one of many working under the name of CPI(ML). The party general secretary was Kanu Sanyal. The name of the party is identical to the original CPI(ML) formed in 1969, of which Sanyal was also a key leader, but Sanyal has stated that his party is not the same as this party.

== History ==
The present party was formed through a merger of Sanyal's Communist Organization of India (Marxist–Leninist) and Communist Party of India (Marxist–Leninist) Unity Initiative in June 2003. In November 2003 Communist Party of Indian Union (Marxist–Leninist) merged with the party. The strength of the party is mainly concentrated to Andhra Pradesh, Jharkhand and West Bengal.

The party central organ is Class Struggle.

In the elections 2004 CPI (ML) launched five candidates to the Lok Sabha and one to the Andhra Pradesh assembly.

Results from the Lok Sabha elections:

- Parvathipuram, Andhra Pradesh: Uooyaka Mutyalu 13895 votes (2.1%)
- Jhargram, West Bengal: Leba Chand Tudu 9422 votes (1,18%)
- Ranchi, Jharkhand: Anjani Kumar Pandey 2044 votes (0,29%)
- Darjeeling, West Bengal: Raju Bhatta 11112 votes (1,25%)

Ahead of the Lok Sabha elections 2004 the party and the Communist Party of India (Marxist–Leninist) Red Flag had taken the initiative to form a united front of communist group. The two parties agreed to merge at a unity conference in late January 2005. Communist Party of India (Marxist-Leninist) Red flag split before the merger and one section of that party merge with CPI (ML).

Just ahead of the 2006 West Bengal legislative election two regional party leaders, Somnath Chatterjee (not to be confused with the Lok Sabha speaker Somnath Chatterjee) from Ukhra and Pradip Banerjee from Kolkata, broke away from the party.

In 2009 January CPI (ML) Red flag faction split from the CPI (ML) and formed its own group. 2010 March 23 Kanu Sanyal expired and Viswam was elected as General Secretary of CPI (ML). In 2011, All India convention of Trade Unions called at Visakapattanam and formed All India Federation of Trade Unions (New).(AIFTU-New). In 2011, All India convention Peasants called at Sreekakulam and formed All India Khet Mazdoor Kisan Saba.(AIKMKS). In 2013, CPI (ML) and CPI (ML) Jansakthi merged and elected Viswam as General Secretary. Class Struggle is CC CPI (ML) organ in English.

== See also ==
- Nava Yuva Samithi
- List of Naxalite and Maoist groups in India
