= Ravindra Prabhat =

Hindi poet, scholar, journalist, author (born 1969)

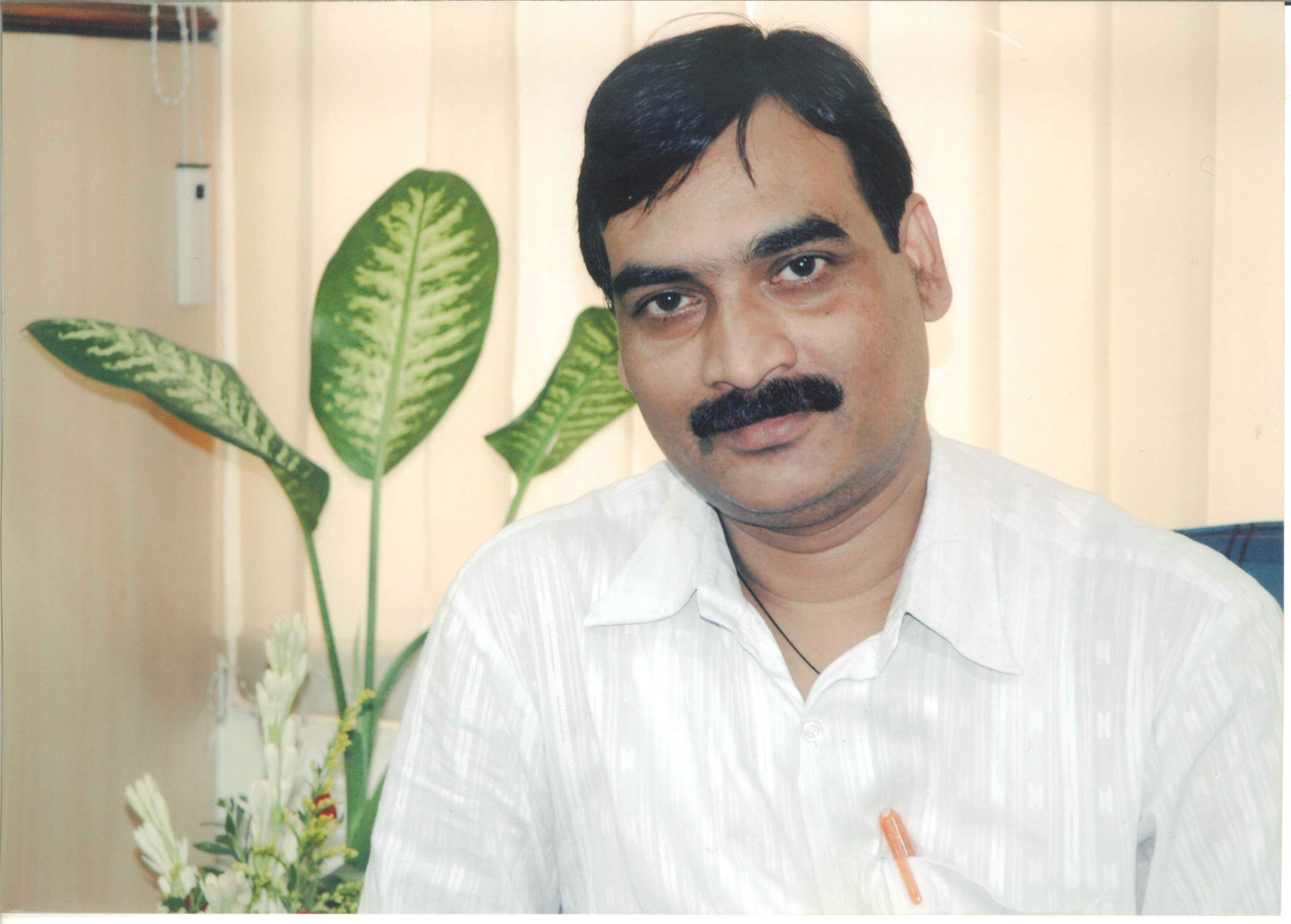
- Prabhat in December 2008
- Born: Ravindra Kumar Chaubey; 5 April 1969 (age 57); Mahindwara, Sitamarhi, Bihar, India
- Occupations: Poet, writer, journalist
- Spouse(s): M. Prabhat (1989–present)
- Children: Urvija, Subendu Prabhat and Urvashi
- Writing career
- Pen name: Prabhat
- Period: (1991–present)
- Genres: Poetry, ghazal, story writing and blog criticism
- Subjects: Literature and blogs
- Movement: Initiative to Hindi blog criticism
- Website: www.ravindraprabhat.in

Ravindra Prabhat (born 5 April 1969) is a Hindi-language novelist, journalist, poet, and short story writer from India.

== Early life and education ==
Prabhat was born on 5 April 1969 in the village of Mahindwara, Sitamarhi, in Bihar, India. He was raised and received his primary education in Mahindwara. He obtained his higher education in geography honours from B. R. Ambedkar Bihar University in Muzaffarpur. Later, he studied Master of Journalism and Mass Communication (MJMC) at the Uttar Pradesh Rajarshi Tandon Open University, Allahabad.

== Personal life ==
According to Brahmin tradition, he underwent an upanayan initiation aged eleven. He married M. Prabhat, in Bettiah on 18 May 1989. They have a son and two daughters.

== Literary career ==
Prabhat has been writing since 1987 on various subjects. Some of his works have been translated into other languages and published in various literary magazines and anthologies. Prabhat currently serves as chief editor of VatVriksh and Parikalpana Samay (Hindi Magazine).

== Writings and style ==
Prabhat often writes about social issues and human suffering.

=== Blogging ===
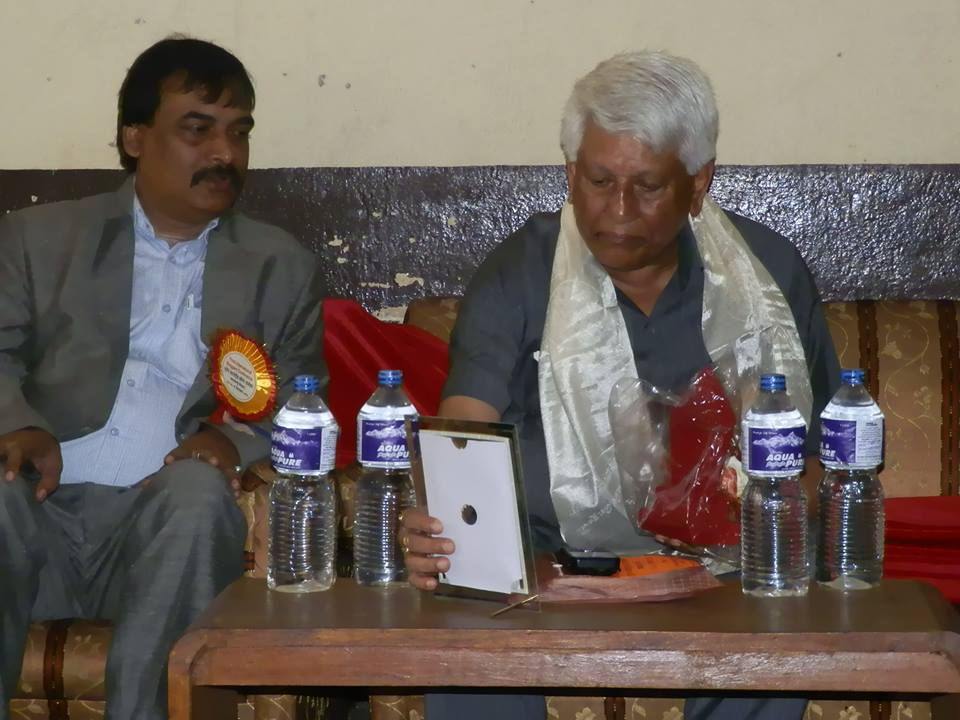
Ravindra Prabhat with Nepali politician Arjun Narasingha in Kathmandu, Nepal, 2013

Prabhat has written and edited works on Hindi blogging and has also published his writing in the form of a blog. He started blogging in 2007 and has published fiction as well as reviews of other blogs.

Prabhat is a founding member of the Parikalpna Award, a blog literary award in India. It is presented by the magazine Parikalpana Samay and the Non-governmental organization Parikalpnaa. The first Parikalpna Award was presented on 30 April 2011.

== Bibliography ==
=== Books ===
Fiction

- Taki Bacha Rahe Loktantra(2011) ISBN 9788191038583 (Hindi)
- Prem Na Hat Bikay (2012) ISBN 9789381394106 (Hindi)
- Dharati Pakad Nirdaliya (2013) ISBN 9789381394519 (Hindi)
- Lakhanaua Kakka(2018) ISBN 978-93-83967-40-7(Bhojpuri)
- Kashmir 370 kilometer (Notion Press, 2019) ISBN 9781647609320 (Hindi)
- Dhartiputri Sita (Notion Press, 2020) ISBN 9781637452745 (Hindi)
- Pratishruti (Notion Press, 2021) ISBN 9781639970735 (Hindi)

Non-fiction

- Contemporary Nepali Literature (Hindi: समकालीन नेपाली साहित्य) (critical writings, essays and interviews,1995)
- History of Hindi Blogging (Hindi: हिन्दी ब्लॉगिंग का इतिहास) (2011) ISBN 978-93-80916-14-9 (Hindi)
- Contributor to Hindi Blogging: Expression of new revolution (Hindi: हिन्दी ब्लॉगिंग: अभिव्यक्ति की नई क्रांति) (2011) ISBN 978-93-80916-05-7
- Hindi Bhasha ke vividh ayam (Rashtriy Aur Antarrashtriy Pariprekshya men)(2018) ISBN 978-93-84397-67-8 (Hindi essays collection)
- Responsibility Awareness & Public Behavior (Hindi: दायित्व बोध और लोक व्यवहार) (Notion Press, 2019) ISBN 9781647832902 (Hindi/English)
- Social Media and Us (Hindi: samajik midia aur ham) (Notion Press, 2020) ISBN 9781648055621 (Hindi)
- SHARE MARKET(Nivesh Ke Tareeke)(Notion Press, 2020) ISBN 9781636334752 (Hindi)
- Dr. Mithilesh Dikshit ka sahitya srijan evam pradey (Hindi: डॉ. मिथिलेश दीक्षित का साहित्य सृजन एवं प्रदेय) (Parikalpana Samay Publications Lucknow, 2021) ISBN 9781639579082 (Hindi)
- Media aur Social Media (Indraprasth Prakashan Delhi, 2021) ISBN 9789392696015 (Hindi)

Documentaries

- Naya Bihan (Screen Play Writer, 1992) television documentary film on Women's Education under the UNESCO related plan of Unit of Sitamarhi District in "Bihar Education Project".

Poetry collections

- Ham Safar (1991) (his first poetry collection)
- Mat Rona Ramjani Chacha (1999)
- Smriti Shesh (2002)

Magazines

- Urvija 1992 to 1995. Published at Sitamarhi, Bihar in India.
- Fagunahat, 1990 to 1992a yearly magazine published at Sitamarh, Bihar in India.
- Samvad, 1993, editor of a special issue of this monthly magazine, whose principal editor was Basant Arya.
- Sahityanjali, 1994. editor of a special issue of this monthly magazine, whose principal editor was Madhvendra Verma.
- Hamari Vani 2010, a Hindi e-journal. he was consulting editor for the year 2010.
- Parikalpna Blogotsav, 2012 - . He is chief editor of this Internet web journal.
- Vatvriksh, May 2011 to May 2013. A Hindi magazine published in Lucknow. He is chief editor.
- Parikalpana Samay, June 2013 - A monthly Hindi magazine published in Lucknow. He is chief editor.

== Adaptations of Prabhat's works ==
- Dr. Siyaram has written a Book of Prabhat's works-

Ravindra Prabhat Ki Parikalpana aur Blog alochana karm(2017) ISBN 978-93-83967-35-3 (Hindi)

- "Ravindra Prabhat ka Upanyas Sahitya ek Anushilan" (Laghu Shodh, Hindi) Pratiksha Kumari/chhatrapati Shahuji Maharaj Kanpur University
- Audiobook: Prem Na Haat Bikay (Narrator: Ashish Jain)
- Audiobook: Dharati Pakad Nirdaliy (Narrator: Kafeel Jafri)
- Echoes of the Getaway (Notion Press, 2020) ISBN 9781636065694 ASIN B08QN6D2QB(The original book in Hindi Kashmir 370 kilometer was translated into English by Gautam Roy)
- Audiobook: Kashmir 370 kilometer on Storytel (Narrator: Mukul Srivastava)
- Audiobook: Echoes of the Getaway Behind the dark shadows of the Valley on Storytel (Narrator: Mukul Srivastava)
- Audiobook: "Pratishruti" on Storytel (Narrator: Mukul Srivastava)
- Audiobook: "Dhartiputri Sita" on Storytel (Narrator:Kusum verma)
- Stings of the Exodus (Notion Press, 2023) ISBN 979-8890026767 ASIN B0BZPBCL94(The original book in Hindi Pratishruti was translated into English by Gautam Roy)
