= Attacks on RTI activists in India =

Many Right to Information Act (RTI) activists, including policemen, have been harassed and even murdered for seeking information to "promote transparency and accountability in the working of every public authority" in India. Many face assaults on a regular basis. People seeking information from their gram panchayat and the local administration also face social ostracism. A few activists who sought information under RTI about scams related to the National Rural Employment Guarantee Act, 2005, were killed. Many threats and attacks (including murder) go unreported by the media.

Media reports of more than 300 instances of attacks on or harassment of citizens and at least 51 murders and 5 suicides can be linked to information sought under The Right to Information Act. Maharashtra followed by Gujarat tops the list for states with the most attacks on RTI users.

== Overview ==
RTI activists are vulnerable human rights defenders (HRDs) in India. Unlike other HRDs, a majority of the RTI activists are not part of an organisation; they often act alone, moved by anger at corruption and other illegal activities. RTI activists are vulnerable because they live in the same areas as public authorities and political leaders who do not want information about their activities to be disclosed. For the most part, human rights defenders receive media attention only when killed or seriously injured. When complaints are made by RTI activists, law enforcement personnel (who often work with corrupt officials) do not take appropriate action . The Right to Information Act, 2005 provides inadequate protection to whistleblowers. The Central Information Commission and the State Information Commissions are not mandated to deal with such threats or attacks or to provide protection when needed. Attacks on RTI users have not ceased despite directions from several information commissions and state governments to protect them from harm.

== List of attacks ==
There are two sources of crowd sourced lists maintained of the attacks on people using RTI to seek transparency and accountability, primarily based on media reports. The first is via the National Campaign for People's Right to Information. A "Hall of Shame" is maintained by CHRI.

=== Killed/Murdered ===
| Name | State | District / Location | Date | Attack type | Nature of Activism |
|---|---|---|---|---|---|
| Sudhir Chaudhary | Gujarat | Tapi | 2024 | Killed | |
| Devjit Singh | Uttar Pradesh | Aligarh | | | |
| Gattu Vamana Rao and his wife Nagamani | Telangana | Peddapalli | 2021-02-18 | Murdered by Knife | RTI filed for land issue, more details waiting for the culprits. |
| Ranjan Kumar Das | Odisha | Kendrapara | 2020-02-01 | Killed | Regularly filed RTIs on local issues, including brick kilns. |
| Sanjay Dubey | Maharashtra | Mumbai | 2019-05-20 | Murdered | Filed RTI regarding illegal construction and PIL in High court against a politician. |
| Chirag Patel | Gujrat | Ahmadabad | 2019-03-16 | Killed | Obtaining information regarding MPLAD. |
| Vinayak Shirsath | Maharashtra | Pune | 2019-02-12 | Murdered | Filed RTI regarding illegal construction. |
| Bhola Sah | Bihar | Banka | 2018-12-23 | Killed | Exposed financial irregularities in Social Welfare schemes. |
| Manoj Tripathi | Madhya Pradesh | Bhopal | 2018-11-02 | Fall from building | RTI filed. Complaint against powerful leader. |
| Rohit Ashoke Junaware | Maharashtra | Pune | 2018-11-01 | Killed | Construction related information. |
| Kedar Singh Jindan | Himachal Pradesh | Sirmaur | 2018-09-07 | Killed | Exposed various jobs related scam. |
| Parshuram Pradhan | Odisa | Sambhalpur | 2018-08-27 | Killed | Exposed corruption in cooperative societies |
| Valmiki Yadav | Bihar | Jamui | 2018-07-01 | Killed | Exposed various corrupt practices in Panchayat level programme. |
| Rajendra Prasad Singh | Bihar | East Champaran | 2018-06-21 | Killed | Exposed Several corruption in police recruitment, PDS, toilet scheme, health and education scheme through his RTI application. |
| Jayant Kumar | Bihar | Vaishali | 2018-04-04 | Killed | Exposed corruption in Bihar State Food Corporation. Collected information regarding corrupt practices by policeman and politicians. |
| Nanjibhai Sondarva | Gujarat | Rajkot | 2018-03-09 | Clubbed to death | For filing RTIs to expose financial irregularities in the developmental works undertaken in a village |
| Mirtyunjay Singh | Bihar | Bhojpur | 2017 | Killed | |
| Mukesh Dube | Madhya Pradesh | Moraina | 2017-09-26 | Stabbed to Death | Exposed corruption in Panchayats |
| Md Tahiruddin | West Bengal | | 2016-11-19 | Murdered | Exposed MGNREGA scams in Gram Panchayat of Uttar Dinajpur district of West Bengal, disseminated Information to job card holders, whose bank accounts were used for withdrawing money in name of fake projects. He was working under the organization PACT Org as a volunteer, it is an organization working in the field of Transparency and anti-corruption |
| Lalit Mehta | Jharkhand | | 2008-05-15 | Killed | Mehta used RTI to expose NREGA related scams. Fought for the social audit of NREGA |
| Kameshwar Yadav | Jharkhand | | 2008-06-07 | Killed | Sought information on the nexus among officers, politicians, contractors and middlemen in NREGA related irrigation projects in Deori. |
| Venkatesh | Karnataka | | 2009-06-04 | | |
| Satish Shetty | Maharashtra | Pune | 2010-01-13 | Killed | |
| Arun Sawant | Maharashtra | | 2010-01-02 | Killed | |
| Vishram Laxman Dodiya | Gujarat | | 2010-02-11 | Killed | |
| Shashidhar Mishra | Bihar | Begusarai | 2010-02-14 | Killed | |
| Sola Ranga Rao | Andhra Pradesh | | 2010-04-11 | Killed | |
| Vitthal Gite | Maharashtra | Aurangabad | 2010-04-21 | Killed | |
| Dattatraya Patil | Maharashtra | Ichalkaranji | 2010-05-22 | Killed | |
| Gopal Prasad | Bihar | Buxar | 2010-07-19 | Killed | |
| Amit Jethwa | Gujarat | Ahmedabad | 2010-07-20 | Killed | Used RTI to expose illegal mining in the Gir Forest area. Dinu Boga arrested by CBI in this case. Earlier Gujarat police had given clean chit to Dinu Boga. |
| Vijay Pratap (alias Babbu Singh) | Uttar Pradesh | | 2010-07-25 | Killed | |
| Ramdas Ghadegaonkar | Maharashtra | | 2010-08-27 | Killed | |
| Niyamat Ansari | Jharkhand | | 2011-02-03 | Killed | Exposed corruption by contractors in work under MNREGA. |
| Jagdish | Haryana | | 2011-10-02 | Attempt to kill | Jagdish and Phool Singh, another resident of his village, unearthed a pension scam and subsequently filed a case of alleged fraud against the accused in the court. The Village Head tried to kill him, but only managed to crush his legs and killed his daughter-in-law Sonu. |
| Amit Kapasia | Gujarat | | 2011-12-29 | Killed | |
| Shehla Masood | Madhya Pradesh | | 2011-08-16 | Killed | |
| Dr. Murlidhar Jaiswal | Bihar | Munger | 2012-03-04 | Killed | |
| Rahul Kumar | Bihar | Katihar | 2012-03-11 | Killed | |
| Rajesh Yadav | Bihar | Gaya | 2012-12-12 | Killed | |
| S Bhuvaneswaran | Tamil Nadu | | 2012-10-01 | Killed | |
| Nadeem Saiyed | Gujarat | | 2011-05-11 | Killed (reason possibly unrelated) | |
| Ramvilas Singh | Bihar | Lakhisarai | 2011-08-12 | Killed (reason possibly unrelated) | |
| V Balasubramanian | Tamil Nadu | | 2010-08-19 | Killed(?) | |
| Premnath Jha | Maharashtra | Mumbai, Virar | 2012-02-25 | Killed | Filed several RTI queries with the Vasai Virar Municipal Corporation seeking details of several construction projects |
| Vasudeva Adiga | Karnatka | Udupi | 2013-01-12 | Killed | |
| Ram Kumar Thakkur | Bihar | Ratnauli, Muzaffarpur | 2013-03-23 | Killed | Lawyer; Persisted with a legal case exposing "irregularities" in the implementation of NREGA welfare scheme in his village. Earlier, used RTI and exposed fraud involving sarpanch (village head). |
| Sanjay Tyagi | Uttar Pradesh | Meerut | 2014-05-25 | Killed | |
| Shivshankar Jha | Bihar | Saharsa | 2014 | Killed | |
| Sandeep Kothari | Maharashtra | Nagpur | 2015-06-19 till 2015-06-21 | Strangled and then burned to death | Exposed illegal sand mining and land grabbing |
| Surendra Sharma | Bihar | Masaurhi | 2015-04-03 | Killed | |
| Gopal Tiwari | Bihar | Gopalganj | 2015 | Killed | |
| Ramakan Singh | Bihar | Rohtas | 2016 | Killed | |
| Ramesh Agarwal | Chattishgarh | Raigarh | 2012-07-07 | Shot | |
| Vinayak Baliga | Karnataka | Mangalore | 2016-03-21 | Hacked to death | |

=== Abducted/Kidnapped and Tortured ===
| Name | State | District / Location | Date | Attack type | Nature of Activism |
|---|---|---|---|---|---|
| Anoop Singh | Uttar Pradesh | Noida, Dankaur Town | December 2013 | Abducted and Tortured | An RTI activist was abducted from Dankaur town in Gautam Budh Nagar district on 13 December, burnt with cigarette butts on his private parts and beaten with iron rods before being dumped near a petrol pump in a neighbouring district four days later. |

=== Assault ===
| Name | State | Date | Attack type | Nature of Activism |
|---|---|---|---|---|
| Yashwant Shinde | Maharashtra | Jan 2020 | Physical assault | Shinde had sought details under RTI on Worli police's seizure of Rs. 4 crore in cash from a car during state assembly elections. |
| Sambhuram Bishnoi | Rajasthan | Oct 2013 | Abduct and Assault with hockey and iron rods in his village sarpanch's house while going for aadhaar card enrollment and killed | Exposed MNREGA, Sajal Dhara tubewell scam against his village sarpanch |
| Adv. Mohd. Hasim Shaikh | Maharashtra | 5 Jan 2014 | Assault with Hockey and Iron rods in the late evening when going towards home, got major injuries and also got finger fractured, the assaulters took away the cell phone and a wallet. | Exposed License scams in BMC and also got Penalized officers of BMC by State Information Commissions, working as an alert and active citizen, associated with various citizens group. |
| Rinku Singh Rahi | Uttar Pradesh | 26 Mar 2009 | Assaulted, removed to a mental institution. | Rahi is a bureaucrat who used RTI to expose welfare scheme fraud in Muzaffarnagar |
| Firoz Ibrahim Khan | Maharashtra | 17 Nov 2007 | Assault | |
| Gopalbandhu Chhatria | Odisha | 2 Jan 2009 | Assault | |
| Ripu Daman Ohri | Punjab | 6 Jan 2009 | Assault | |
| Munikrishna | Karnataka | 27 Oct 2009 | Assault | |
| Ajay Kumar | Delhi | 1 Jan 2010 | Assault | Used RTI to enquire about private house/shop construction on public land under authorization given by a Delhi politician. |
| Kiran Pandey | Punjab | 1 Oct 2010 | Assault | |
| Sumaira Abdulali | Maharashtra | 16 Mar 2010 | Assault (in 2003 at Kihim Beach and 2010 at Mahad) | |
| RAJEEV SARKAR alias RAJIB SARKAR | WEST BENGAL | 20 July 2015 | Assault (in 2015 at Baguati and 2016 at Baguiati and arrest by false case 2017) | |
| Abhay Patil | Maharashtra | 4 Jan 2010 | Assault | |
| Ashok Kumar Shinde | Maharashtra | 17 Jul 2010 | Assault | |
| Budhai Kumar | Uttar Pradesh | 8 Sept 2010 | Assault | |
| S Channabasappa Patil | Karnataka | 9/16/10 | Assault | |
| Yashwant Gavand | Maharashtra | 1 February 2011 | Assault | |
| Arun Baburao Mane | Maharashtra | 1 February 2011 | Assault | |
| Salman Reddy | Orissa | 1/17/11 | Assault | |
| Safdar Ali | Jammu and Kashmir | 1/20/11 | Assault | |
| Vikrant Karnik | Maharashtra | 1/25/11 | Assault | |
| Amar Pandey | Uttar Pradesh | 1/27/11 | Assault | |
| Gopal Prasad, Anil Mittal, Nanda Sawant | Delhi | 2 March 2011 | Assault | |
| Mangala Ram | Rajasthan | 3 March 2011 | Assault | |
| Bharat Guggul, Bhanji Jogen | Gujarat | 3 May 2011 | Assault | |
| Vishnu Medhkar | Maharashtra | 4 February 2011 | Assault | |
| Dilip Jaiswal | Maharashtra | 4 May 2011 | Assault | |
| Arvind Kaushal | Maharashtra | 4 August 2011 | Assault | |
| Popat Barge | Maharashtra | 4/17/11 | Assault | |
| Jai Bhagwan and Karambir | Haryana | 5/21/11 | Assault | |
| Ismail Patwari | Maharashtra | 5/27/11 | Assault | |
| C.P. Singh | Maharashtra | 6/22/11 | Assault | |
| Baghu Dewani | Gujarat | 6/24/11 | Assault | |
| Ganasham Kunkolkar | Goa | 7/22/11 | Assault | |
| Jaisukh Bambhania | Daman and Diu | 8 August 2011 | Assault | |
| Sanjit Das | Meghalaya | 8/14/11 | Assault | |
| Ajay Ambalia | Gujarat | 8/31/11 | Assault | |
| Parshuram Kishanlal Mali | Gujarat | 9 July 2011 | Assault | |
| Manisha Goswami | Gujarat | 9/21/11 | Assault | |
| Mehul Kataria | Maharashtra | 10 July 2011 | Assault | |
| Santosh M Tiwari | Maharashtra, Gujarat | 10/16/11 | Assault | |
| Poonam Solanki | Gujarat | 12 February 2011 | Assault | |
| Akhilesh Saxena | Uttar Pradesh | 2008 | Assault | |
| Parameswar Sabar | Orissa | June 2011 | Assault | |
| Niren Pareek, Christopher Minz | Assam | May 2007 | Assault | |
| Tapal Ganesh | Karnataka | Unknown | Assault | |
| Purshottam Chauhan | Gujarat | Unknown | Assault | |
| Narayan Hareka | Orissa | Unknown | Assault | |
| Akhil Gogoi | Assam | Unknown | Assault | |
| Sumit Kumar Mahato | Jharkhand | Unknown | Assault | |
| Ms. Poonam Solanki | Gujarat | 12 July 2011 | Assault | Human Rights Activist |
| Dudhram | Rajasthan, Jaipur | 2 February 2012 | Assault | |
| Akhil Gogoi | Assam, Nalbari | 5 July 2012 | Assault | |
| Rajesh suresh Bobade | Maharashtra | 21 September 2012 | Assault | |
| L.K.Thapliyal | Uttarakhand | 25 July 2013 | Assault | Beaten up by a group of men including a ranger, Devendra Baurai from the Chilawali range of Rajaji National Park. Mr L.K. Thapliyal had filed a RTI against Rajaji National Park. |
| Anand Kumar Sharma | Odisha | 11 Feb 2018 | Assault, Illegal detention by police and illegal custody by SDJM | Beaten up in police station with grievous injury as he exposed the corruption in Police Department. |
| Nilofar | Uttar Pradesh | 26 October 2018 | Assault | Exposed corruption against gram pradhan. |
| Sunil Kapoor | Haryana | April 2018 | Thrashed by masked assailants | Social |
| Krishanpal | Uttar pradesh | 15 May 2019 | Assault | Exposed illegal possession in government land. |

=== Harassment ===
| Name | State | Date | Attack type | Nature of Activism |
|---|---|---|---|---|
| Srikant Pakal | Odisha | Feb 2020 | Harassment | Harassment for filing case in Lokayukt seeking probe against Bishnupada Sethi IAS and alleged that the officer spent Rs 9.46 lakh towards the hospitalisation of his wife and father from the funds of Odisha State Cooperative Bank, in violation of the existing norms during his stint as secretary of cooperation department. |
| Bibhav Kumar, Rajeev Kumar | Uttar Pradesh | 1/26/07 | Harassment | |
| Tukaram Bansode | Maharashtra | 12/31/07 | Harassment | |
| V Gopalakrishnan | Tamil Nadu | 3/13/09 | Harassment | |
| Srikant Prabhu | Maharashtra | 5 January 2009 | Harassment | |
| Kishori Ram | Bihar | 7/21/09 | Harassment | |
| Goverdhan Singh | Rajasthan | 3 January 2010 | Harassment | |
| Mohit Sharma | Delhi | 3 December 2010 | Harassment | |
| Jay Kumar Raghuvanshi | Maharashtra | 3/13/10 | Harassment | |
| Davinder Khurana | Punjab | 4 February 2010 | Harassment | |
| Ramesh Agrawal | Chhattisgarh | 6/23/10 | Harassment | |
| Ganesh Borhade | Maharashtra | 7 July 2010 | Harassment | |
| Manish Bhatnagar | Maharashtra | 7/18/10 | | |
| Harshad Patil | Maharashtra | 8/13/10 | Harassment | |
| Gopalkrishnan, Siva Elango, Madhav Vishnubhatta | Tamil Nadu | 9 January 2010 | Harassment | |
| Fatima Mynsong, Acquiline Songthiang, Matilda Suting | Meghalaya | 9 January 2010 | Harassment | |
| Abhijit Ghosh | Maharashtra | 9 January 2010 | Harassment | |
| Ratna Ala | Gujarat | 9/29/10 | Harassment | |
| Bobby Basaiawmoit | Meghalaya | 2 January 2011 | Harassment | |
| Mary Anne Pohshna | Meghalaya | 3 September 2011 | Harassment | |
| Sanjay Gurav | Maharashtra | 3/22/11 | Harassment | |
| M Z Ali | Karnataka | 5 October 2011 | Harassment | |
| Ketan Shah | Gujarat | 5 December 2011 | Harassment | |
| Ravinder Rathi | Haryana | 6 February 2011 | Harassment | |
| Payi Gyadi | Arunachal Pradesh | 6 May 2011 | Harassment | |
| Brijesh Kumar | Delhi | 8 February 2011 | Harassment | |
| Ashok Paswan | Bihar | 8/19/11 | Harassment | |
| Arvind Sharma | Punjab | 9 May 2011 | Harassment | |
| Derrick Dias | Goa | 9 November 2011 | Harassment | |
| Subhash Aggarwal | Delhi | 10 July 2011 | Harassment | |
| Sheeba Fehmi and Arshad Ali Fehmi | Delhi | 10 August 2011 | Harassment | |
| Sanjay Gurav | Maharashtra | 11/28/11 | Harassment | |
| Anupam Saraf, Vaibhav Gandhi and Dinesh Shah | Maharashtra | 12/13/11 | Harassment | |
| R. Marijoseph | Karnataka | 12/30/11 | Harassment | |
| Kishan Lal Gera | Haryana | Since 2008 | Harassment | |
| R V Prasanna | Karnataka | Since 2009 | Harassment | |
| Shiv Prakash Rai | Bihar | May 2008 | Harassment | |
| Takhellambam Ibempishak, Sagolsem Memcha and Konjengbam Anita | Manipur | Since Apr 2011 | Harassment | |
| Pawan Sharma | Uttar Pradesh | Since 11 April 2011 | Harassment | |
| Emmanuel | Andhra Pradesh | February and March 2011 | Harassment | |
| Jagbir Singh | Delhi | Since February 2011 | Harassment | |
| Biren Luwang | Manipur | Since April 2011 | Harassment | |
| Injambakkam H Sekar | Tamil Nadu | Since August 2011 | Harassment | |
| Khirasindhu Sagria | Orrisa | Since November 2011 | Harassment | |
| Muzibur Rehman | Unknown | 2007 | Harassment | |
| Saleem Baig | Uttar Pradesh | 2007 | Harassment | |
| Asith Sangma | Meghalaya | 2008 | Harassment | |
| Ashok Verma | Punjab | 2009 | Harassment | |
| Kheemaram | Rajasthan | 2010 | Harassment | |
| Shivaji Raut | Maharashtra | June 2011 | Harassment | |
| Ajay Gakhar | Delhi | July 2011 | Harassment | |
| All Gujarat RTI users | Gujarat | July 2011 | Harassment | |
| Ankur Patil | Maharashtra | September 2011 | Harassment | |
| Gunjan Mehta | Gujarat | December 2011 | Harassment | |
| Durga | Delhi | 2011 | Harassment | |
| C J Karira | Andhra Pradesh | 2011 | Harassment | |
| Nelapati Papireddy, Pachalla Suryanarayana Reddy and Kovuru Satyanarayana Reddy | Andhra Pradesh | 2011 | Harassment | |
| Mohinder Kumar | Punjab | Unknown | Harassment | |
| Anwar Shaikh | Maharashtra | Unknown | Harassment | |
| Y. Ekyimo Kikon | Nagaland | Unknown | Harassment | |
| Ashok Rathod | Gujarat | Unknown | Harassment | |
| Bharat H Gajjar, Milan Joshi | Gujarat | Unknown | Harassment | |
| Rolly Shivhare | Madhya Pradesh | Unknown | Harassment | |
| Jai Prakash Arya | Delhi | Unknown | Harassment | |
| Gian Singh | Delhi | Unknown | Harassment | |
| Ram Sagar | Delhi | Unknown | Harassment | |
| Sumankant Raichaudhari | Bihar | Unknown | Harassment | |
| Piyusha Tiwari | Rajasthan | Unknown | Harassment | |
| Rayabhai Zapadiya | Gujarat | Unknown | Harassment | |
| Razuddin | Haryana | Unknown | Harassment | |
| Rukhminibhai | Andhra Pradesh | Unknown | Harassment | |
| Roshan Lobo | Karnataka | Unknown | Harassment | |
| Bhadresh Wamja | Gujarat | Unknown | Harassment | |
| Bhanjibhai Jogel and Bharatbhai Ghughal | Gujarat | Unknown | Harassment | |
| Sudhir Yadav | Haryana, Gurgaon | 6 October 2013 | Harassment | An RTI Activist who tried to Bring all the documents of Corruption From Villages of the Block Farrukh Nagar, Gurgaon was threaten to be killed if he continue filling the RTI against Sarpanch and keep asking about the development work. |
| Dilip kumar reddy k | Hyderabad | 3 Jan 2014 | Removed from the job | Exposed corruption in engineering college fee reimbursement and seat allocation at aurora Institute. |
| Mushtaq Pahalgami | Jammu and Kashmir | 27 December 2010 | Physically attacked, abused, threatened against filing any further RTIs/PILs | Exposed forest land-grab attempts by the local land mafia, helped ensure the High Court construction ban in the region |

=== Suicide ===
| Name | State | Date | Attack type | Nature of Activism |
|---|---|---|---|---|
| Jabbardan Gadhvi | Gujarat | 22 February 2011 | Suicide | |
| Sunil Kapoor | Haryana | 14 September 2025 | Suicide | Social |

== See also ==
- Right to Information Act, 2005
