= Mahant Darshan Das Mahila College =

Degree college in Bihar

- Type: Undergraduate College
- Established: 1946; 80 years ago
- Affiliations: Babasaheb Bhimrao Ambedkar Bihar University
- Location: Muzaffarpur, Bihar, India
- Website: https://mddmcollegebed.in

Mahant Darshan Das Mahila Mahavidyalaya is a college affiliated with Babasaheb Bhimrao Ambedkar Bihar University. It was founded in 1946 and accepts only women students.

== Founding ==
The college was established on 15 August 1946 near Chapman Girl's High School.

=== Founders ===
- Rai Bahadur Shri Narayan Mahatha
- Rai Bahadur Uma Shanker Pd.
- Shri Harisadan Bhaduri
- Dr. J. K. Sarkar
- Rai Bahadur Veereshwar Chatterjee
- Shri Atulanand Sen
- Shri Mahesh Pd. Singh
- Mahant Darshan Das

== Present day ==
The college now has about 5,000 students, offering several diploma courses, specifically in microbiology.

And various graduate and undergraduate courses including BSc., Bachelor of arts etc.

== Notable alumni ==
Nutan Thakur- Lucknow based political and social activist
