= Communist Organisation of India (Marxist–Leninist) =

Political organization in India

Poster in Bengali language, announcing a joint meeting of COI (ML), Communist Party of India (Marxist-Leninist) Liberation, Communist Party of India (Marxist-Leninist) New Democracy, Communist Party of India (Marxist-Leninist) Red Flag and Marxist Communist Party of India

Communist Organisation of India (Marxist–Leninist) was a political organisation in India. COI (ML) was formed in May 1985 through the merger of six different groups;

- Organising Committee of Communist Revolutionaries led by Kanu Sanyal
- Communist Party of India (Marxist-Leninist) Kaimur Range led by Ravi Shankar.
- Central Organising Committee, Communist Party of India (Marxist–Leninist) led by Umadhar Singh
- A faction of Unity Centre of Communist Revolutionaries of India (Marxist–Leninist) led by Subodh Mitra
- Indian Communist Party led by U. Krishnappa
- Liberation Front led by Sabuj Sen

Kanu Sanyal was elected general secretary of COI (ML). COI (ML) participated in elections.

In 2003 COI (ML) merged with Communist Party of India (Marxist–Leninist) Unity Initiative to form a unified CPI (ML).

== National question ==
COI (ML) held the position that India was multi-national, in which some nationalities dominated the government and suppressed less advanced national groups. The organisation supported the right to self-determination of Jammu & Kashmir, Nagaland and Mizoram.
