= National RTI Forum =

National RTI Forum was an organisation based in Lucknow, Uttar Pradesh, India, founded by ex IPS officers and President, Adhikar Sena Amitabh Thakur and his wife activist and advocate Nutan Thakur.

== Background ==
The group gave "RTI Gallantry Award"s named after murdered RTI activists Satish Shetty, Shashidhar Mishra and Lalit Mehta for some years. In 2010 the awards were given for the first time to a slain RTI activist Amit Jethwa, a forest officer Sanjiv Chaturvedi and an environmentalist Biswajit Mohanty. The awards have no monetary value.
