= Shashidhar =

Shashidhar is an Indian name that may refer to

- Shashidhar Adapa (born 1955), Indian production designer, set designer and puppet designer
- Shashidhar Mishra (1975–2010), Indian Right to Information Act activist
- Marri Shashidhar Reddy (born 1949), Indian politician
- Ranganathan Shashidhar (born 1946), US-based Indian physicist
