= Rinku Singh =

Rinku Singh may refer to:

- Rinku Singh (baseball) (born 1988), Indian professional wrestler and former baseball player
- Rinku Singh (cricketer) (born 1997), Indian cricketer
- Rinku Singh Rahi (born 1982), Indian PCS officer and anti-corruption activist in Uttar Pradesh
