= Umadhar Singh =

Indian politician

Member of the Bihar Legislative Assembly for Hayaghat
- In office 1985–1990 – & 2000–2005

Personal details
- Born: 21 December 1938 Sighwara, Darbhanga
- Died: 18 June 2014 (aged 75) Patna
- Party: Communist Party of India (Marxist) (~1966); All India Coordination Committee of Communist Revolutionaries (~1967); Communist Party of India (Marxist-Leninist) (1969); Communist Party of India (Marxist-Leninist) (Satyanarayan Singh group) (~1978–1980); Central Organising Committee, Communist Party of India (Marxist–Leninist) (−1985); Communist Organisation of India (Marxist-Leninist) (1985–?); Communist Party of India (Marxist-Leninist) New Democracy
- Education: Babasaheb Bhimrao Ambedkar Bihar University, Muzaffarpur

Umadhar Prasad Singh (1938–2014, Hindi: उमाधर प्रसाद सिंह) was an Indian communist politician. Singh was a leader of the student movement in Bihar, and played a role in building the Naxalite movement in the state. He was imprisoned for eight years. After his release he was elected twice to the Bihar Legislative Assembly.

== Childhood ==
Singh was born on 21 December 1938 in Sighwara village, Darbhanga district. He grew up in a peasant household. He was the youngest of four children of Bilat Singh and Swayamvari Devi. His elder brother Shri Ganga Prasad Singh was a socialist leader. Umadhar Singh aided the socialist movement as a young child, carrying food and letters for underground socialist leaders during the Quit India movement.

Singh studied middle education in his home village, later to obtain matriculation at the district school.

== Student movement ==
Singh obtained a BA (Honours) in Economics at CM College in Darbhanga, later obtaining a MA degree in the same subject at Bihar University in Muzaffarpur. As a student he joined the communist student movement. Singh served as president of the student wing of the Communist Party of India (Marxist) in Bihar, the Students Federation, during 1965–1966. He led student protests against K.B. Sahay, the incumbent Chief Minister of the state. During the course of the agitations Singh was charged with arson at Sahay's residence.

== Naxalbari revolt and Mushari struggle ==
In the wake of the Naxalbari revolt Singh was called to Delhi by the party leadership to attend a meeting of student organisers, where M. Basavapunniah tried to convince them to reject the revolt. In Delhi Singh argued against the line of the party leadership and resigned from the party. He joined the Bihar affiliate of the All India Coordination Committee of Communist Revolutionaries, the Bihar Coordination Committee of Communist Revolutionaries. During this phase Singh befriended Satyanarayan Singh.

Seeking to replicate the Naxalbari uprising in Bihar, Singh became a key leader of the Mushari struggle and led the first armed squad in the area. Singh's area of influence included Hayaghat and Darbhanga. On 2 October 1969 a prominent landlord in Darbhaga, B.P. Balani, was killed in broad daylight. B.P. Balani was a socialist, known for his anti-Naxalite stand. On 30 November, Singh was arrested at the Vidyapati Railway Station in Samastipur district. He was charged with the murder of Balani, a charge he accepted in court. Singh was sentenced to life imprisonment, and was kept in solitary confinement, with his legs in chains.

== Release from jail ==
After the end of the Emergency Satyanarayan Singh launched a campaign to secure the release of revolutionary prisoners. Singh refused to comply with the demand by the government to give an undertaking for the withdrawal of the case against him, and thus his release was delayed. On 21 December 1977 he was released unconditionally by the Janata Party government. After his release he maintained that the killing of Balani had been justified and coherent with the party directives at the time.

Singh became a member of the Bihar State Committee of the Communist Party of India (Marxist-Leninist) led by Satyanarayan Singh. He led the Ratnopatti peasant struggle of 1978, during which revolutionaries seized 25 bigha of lands from Hari Mahato (a local landlord). The seized lands were distributed to landless peasants.

== Trade unionism ==
Singh also engaged in trade union activities and founded the APM Kamgar Union at the Ashok Paper Mill. Singh served as the president of the union. Another union founded by Singh was the Metia Palledar Thela Kamgar Union.

== 1978 by-election ==
In 1978 a by-election was held for the Samastipur Lok Sabha seat, after the resignation of the incumbent parliamentarian Karpoori Thakur. Singh stood as a candidate of Satyanarayan Singh's CPI(ML) in the election. Singh finished in third place behind the Janata Party and Congress (I) candidates, obtaining 18,686 votes (3.69%).

== Split from CPI(ML), setting up of COC, CPI(ML) ==
During the crisis in CPI(ML) 1979–1980, Singh voiced opposition towards the strategy and theoretical line of the party; he affirmed that the principal contradiction in Indian context stood between feudalism and the broad masses of the people (as opposed to seeing imperialist hegemony as the principal enemy). Subsequently, Singh split away from Satyanarayan Singh's party led a party of his own for a few years, called the Central Organising Committee, Communist Party of India (Marxist–Leninist) (not to be confused with the COC, CPI(ML) formed in 1974).

Singh contested the Samastipur seat in the 1980 Lok Sabha election, finishing in fourth place with 13,151 votes (2.80%).

== APM closure ==
In 1982 the Ashok Paper Mill was closed down, and Singh initiated a long campaign for its reopening for over 30 years. Under Singh's leadership the APM workers blocked attempts to remove the machinery of the plant. He also struggled for economic compensation for the APM workers that had been laid off, eventually bringing the case in front of the Supreme Court of India.

== Legislator ==
Singh contested the March 1985 election, and won the Hayaghat seat in the Bihar Legislative Assembly. He finished in first place amongst 22 candidates, obtaining 13,539 votes (21.30%). Soon after the election, Singh's party merged into the Communist Organisation of India (Marxist–Leninist) (COI(ML)). Singh became a member of the COI(ML) Central Committee but his tenure in COI(ML) was short-lived, as he clashed with key views of the COI(ML) leadership (regarding electoral politics, viewing China as a socialist state and considering the line of the original Communist Party of India (Marxist-Leninist) as 'terrorist').

Singh lost the Hayaghat seat in the 1990 Bihar Legislative Assembly election. He obtained 27,052 votes (28.47%). The margin between Singh and the winning candidate, Kafil Ahmad of Janata Dal, was merely 382 votes.

== In CPI(ML) New Democracy ==
In 1992 Singh became a member of the Communist Party of India (Marxist-Leninist) New Democracy (CPI(ML) ND). For many years he was a Central Committee member of CPI(ML) ND, and would remain a member of the CPI(ML) ND Bihar State Committee until his death. Singh failed to regain the Hayaghat seat in the 1995 Bihar Legislative Assembly election. He finished in second place with 21,889 votes (24.98%).

In the 2000 Bihar Legislative Assembly election Singh regained the Hayaghat seat. Singh obtained 32,214 votes (30.39%).

Singh lost the Hayaghat seat in the February 2005 Bihar Legislative Assembly election. He finished in third place with 14,215 votes. In the subsequent October 2005 Bihar Legislative Assembly election Singh again finished in third place, this time obtaining 13,467 votes. In the 2010 Bihar Legislative Assembly election Singh finished in sixth place in the Hayaghat constituency. He obtained 4,239 votes (4.66%).

== Death ==
In old age, Singh suffered from diabetes as well as lung and cardiac ailments. On 16 June 2014 Singh suffered a heart attack. The following day he was brought to Patna, where he was hospitalised. He died on 18 June 2014.

His body was shifted to the Bihar Legislative Assembly, where a state funeral service was organised. Participants in the funeral included the Bihar Chief Minister Jitan Ram Manjhi and the Speaker of the Assembly Uday Narayan Chaudhary.
