= Amitabh Thakur =

Indian politician (born 1968)

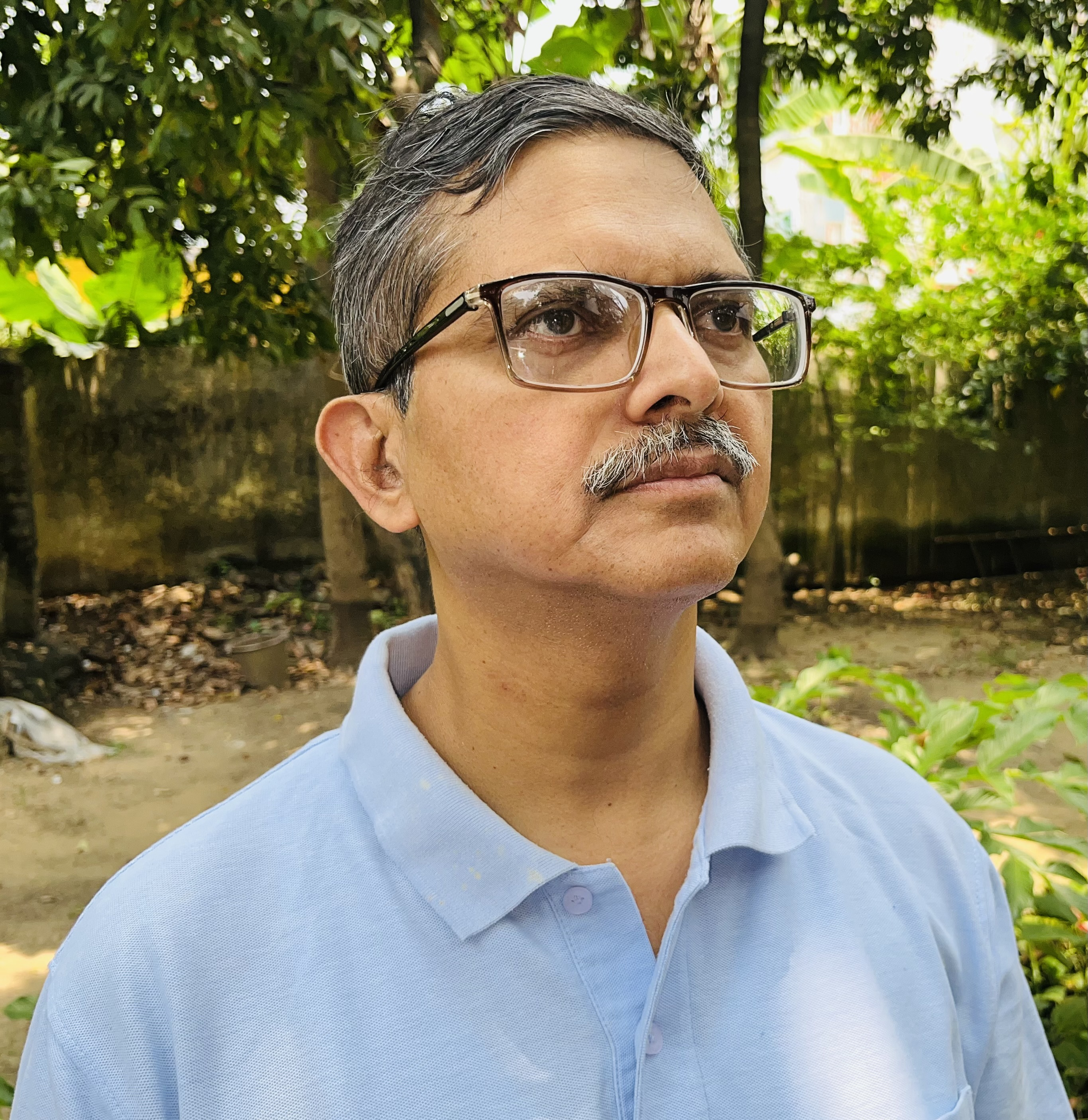
- Thakur in 2026
- Born: 16 June 1968 (age 58); Muzaffarpur, Bihar, India
- Education: IIT Kanpur, (BTech), IIM Lucknow
- Occupation: Former Indian Police Service officer
- Known for: work on transparency and accountability; Azad Adhikar Sena
- Height: 1.65 m (5 ft 5 in)
- Political party: Azad Adhikar Sena (2022)
- Spouse: Dr Nutan Thakur (m. 1993)
- Children: Tanaya Thakur; Aditya Thakur
- Parents: Tapeshwar Narayan Thakur (father); Madhuri Bala (mother)
- Relatives: Avinash Kumar (brother)- IAS Officer, Jharkhand Cadre
- Website: Party website, Party mouthpiece

Amitabh Thakur (born 16 June 1968) is an ex-Indian Police Service (IPS) officer and a political activist. He was forced to undergo compulsory retirement in March 2021. During service, Amitabh was known for his strict adherence to rules and regulations as well as for his work in the field of administrative accountability.

Since retirement, Amitabh works as a social and political activist. He is currently the President of Azad Adhikar Sena. Azad Adhikar Sena was initiated by him, his wife Dr Nutan Thakur, and others.

== Early life ==
Amitabh Thakur was born on 16 June 1968 at Muzaffarpur, Bihar to Tapeshwar Narain Thakur, an Electrical Engineer and Madhuri Bala, a lecturer in Hindi. He was brought up in Bokaro Steel City in present-day Jharkhand (then a part of Bihar), where he got his Matriculation and Intermediate degree from Kendriya Vidyalaya No. 1, Bokaro Steel City, in 1983 and 1985 respectively. He enrolled in IIT Kanpur in 1985, where he obtained his BTech degree in mechanical engineering in 1989.

== Police career ==
Amitabh was commissioned in the Indian Police Service in 1992. His initial field training commenced in Kanpur district, followed by his posting in Gorakhpur; during his stint at the latter, he frequently came at loggerheads with Yogi Adityanath, who eventually became the Chief Minister of Uttar Pradesh. He worked as the Superintendent of Police (SP) in around 10 districts of UP, including Pithoragarh, Lalitpur, Deoria, Gonda, Basti, Sant Kabir Nagar, Firozabad, Ballia and Maharajganj. He also worked in multiple departments including Intelligence, Vigilance, Anti-Corruption and Police Training Academy.

=== Basic Principles of Policing ===
All through his career, Amitabh Thakur worked for the cause of transparency and accountability of the system. He also worked for people friendly policing, giving highest importance to grievance redressal of the poor and the downtrodden.

In this process, he also got deeply engaged in internal police reforms. He particularly worked for betterment of the service conditions of subordinate police officers. He advocated for better internal social and functional environment in police. He also advocated reduction of power distance in police system and closer interaction between superior and subordinate rank police officers. For all this, he strongly advocated for creation of Subordinate officers Police Associations.

=== Important Events in Police career ===
Amitabh Thakur had many clashes with different political and administrative masters, because of his strict and non-compromising approach.

=== Clash with Mulayam Singh Yadav government ===
In 2006, Amitabh was posted as SP of Firozabad district. There he refused to obey some of the dictates of then MLA Ramvir Singh Yadav. Ramveer Singh was a close relative of then Chief Minister, UP and Samajwadi Party Supremo Mulayam Singh Yadav. This finally led to an incidence of alleged assault and manhandling with Amitabh Thakur. Mulayam Singh Yadav clearly told Amitabh not to register any case in this matter. Despite the oral order, Thakur got a First Information Report (FIR) registered in this matter at Eka police station. This led to Thakur extensively suffering at the hands of Mulayam Singh Government.

=== Clash with Mayawati government ===
Amitabh Thakur had another altercation with Government in 2008–09. At that time, Bahujan Samaj Party (BSP) suprempo Mayawati was the Chief Minister. Amitabh was selected for the four-year Fellow Programme in Management (FPM) at IIM Lucknow through the prestigious Common Admission Test (CAT). He approached the Government to grant him a study leave for the course. The Home Department refused the study leave merely to harass Amitabh. Amitabh approached the Lucknow Bench of Central Administrative Tribunal and got Extraordinary leave (i.e., leave without salary) sanctioned. He joined IIM Lucknow and stayed there for 02 years without any salary. He completed his FPM course and came back to service. Later he won his study leave case from the Central Administrative Tribunal and Allahabad High Court. Finally the State Government was forced to give his the entire salary for this period in June 2012. This study leave case is regarded as an important struggle in service matter issues.

=== Clash with Akhilesh Yadav government ===
Amitabh Thakur had his third set of direct altercations with Government in 2014–2017. Samajwadi Party leader Akhilesh Yadav was the Chief Minister at that time. In December 2014, Thakur's wife Dr Nutan Thakur filed a complaint against the state's mining minister Gayatri Prasad Prajapati, before the Lok Ayukta (anti-corruption ombudsman). She alleged that the minister was involved in illegal mining activities. Thakur approached the Central Government, seeking protection for his family.

In January 2015, a woman filed a rape case against Amitabh Thakur, while he was posted as IG (Civil Defence). The woman alleged that Nutan Thakur promised her assistance in getting a government job, and asked her to come to the Thakurs' residence in Gomti Nagar, where she was allegedly raped. The Thakurs dismissed the complaint as bogus, saying that it had been filed and framed in response to Nutan's complaint against the minister, and that the complainant was related to a Samajwadi Party leader.

On 10 July 2015, Amitabh got a phone call from Mulayam Singh Yadav. He alleged that Yadav had threatened him over the phone call. He released the audio of the phone call, in which Yadav is allegedly heard saying certain sentences of threatening nature: Thakur alleged that Mulayam Singh was unhappy about the complaint lodged by his wife Nutan against the state minister Gayatri Prasad Prajapati.

On 11 July 2015, Amitabh presented a complaint before Hazratganj police station for registration of FIR against Mulayam Singh as regards the alleged phone threat. The Police refused to register. But in the same night of 11 July, a rape case was registered against Amitabh and his wife Nutan by the Lucknow police at Gomtinagar police station. This FIR was based on the same old complaint presented in January. Two days later, on 13 July, the state government suspended Thakur, accusing him of "indiscipline, holding anti-government views, dereliction of duty and violating service rules". The government also alleged that he had misused government resources and given incomplete information about his assets in his annual declaration of property, which the government hasn't been able to prove yet.

This was followed by rapid State action against Amitabh. On 13 July, Thakur was suspended. Almost immediately after this, Vigilance enquiry was initiated against him as regards alleged disproportionate assets An FIR for Disproportionate Assets was also registered against him at Thana Gomtinagar in September 2015.

Later Investigations were held in both the rape case and Disproportionate assets case. During investigation, both the charges proved to be incorrect. In the rape case, the Police not only exonerated Thakur, it also charged the complainant of registering a false FIR. Similarly, in the Disproportionate assets case, the investigating agency concluded that the charges were incorrect and Thakur had property much lesser than his known sources of income.

=== Clash with Yogi Adityanath government ===
Amitabh Thakur also had direct altercations during the rule of Bhartiya Janata Party Chief Minister Yogi Adityanath. There was a history of previous conflicts between the two. Amitabh had previously been posted in and around Yogi Adityanath's place of activity, Gorakhpur. The two had many altercations during Thakur's posting as Superintendent of Police in Deoria, Basti and Maharajganj districts. In 2007 Yogi Adityanath was arrested on serious charges related with hate speech and disturbance of law and order. This had led to riots in and around Gorakhpur, including in Maharajganj. Hindu Yuva Vahini of Yogi Adityanath was generally believed to be the force behind these law and order disturbances. Amitabh had taken extremely stern action during these riots. After coming out of jail, Yogi Adityanath had threatened Thakur of dire consequences. There was a 1999 murder case against Yogi Adityanath related with Pachrukhiya in Maharajganj. A Policeman had also been murdered in this case. Yogi Adityanath was a named accused in this case. The case had long been pending with CID. It got transferred to Maharajganj at the same time when Amitabh Thakur was SP Maharajganj. The moment Amitabh initiated its enquiry, he got immense pressure from various powerful corners. He continued his investigation but got transferred midway.

=== Compulsory Retirement ===
It was with this background that Yogi Adityanath government recommended compulsory retirement of Amitabh Thakur and Amitabh was given compulsory retirement in March 2021, even though seven years of his tenure were outstanding. When Amitabh sought information about this retirement from Ministry of Home Affairs, it denied the information. Amitabh has challenged this retirement in Central Administrative Tribunal Lucknow bench, where the matter is currently pending.

=== 2026 Supreme Court Order ===
In June 2026, the Supreme Court directed the Ministry of Home Affairs and Uttar Pradesh Government to complete the four Departmental Enquiries against Thakur within a period of 06 months. The order came in a 2017 Appeal preferred by the State Government against a Allahabad High Court order quashing the appointment of Enquiry Officer.

In the Supreme Court, Thakur argued that his Enquiries were being kept pending for last 10 years, resulting in suffering and loss.

== Arrest ==
In August 2021, Amitabh announced that he would be contesting forthcoming Assembly elections against Yogi Adityanath. Almost immediately after this, he was arrested in August 2021. He was granted bail in March 2022 and came out of jail on bail almost immediately after the Assembly result.

In December 2025, the Lucknow police commissionerate arrested Amitabh Thakur for allegedly abusing his position as superintendent of police of Deoria in 1999 to fraudulently secure an industrial plot in the name of his wife through forged identities and fabricated documents.

He got bail in this matter on 19 January and came out of Deoria Jail on 11 February 2026.

== Activism ==
All through his career as a Police officer, Amitabh Thakur remained a pro-poor, activism oriented person, which often resulted in his direct confrontations with various Governments. He was the founder of the National RTI Forum, a grassroots anti-corruption organisation in India that advocates for government openness under the terms of the 2005 Right to Information Act. The organisation is based in Lucknow. He had also formed Institute for Research and Documentation in Social Sciences (IRDS), a human rights organisation. He recorded the dying declaration of journalist Jagendra Singh; the video allegedly indicated the involvement of a state's minister in Singh's death. In January 2011, Amitabh filed an FIR against Facebook and some of its users, for offensive comments against Mahatma Gandhi in a Facebook group called "I hate Gandhi". Facebook banned the group a couple of days later. Amitabh Thakur and his wife Nutan have filed over 500 RTI applications and 150 Public Interest Litigations (PILs). A number of PILs filed by the Thakurs resulted in action.

== As a writer ==
Thakur has authored a story book in Hindi, Dhal Gayi Raat, and has compiled two collections of poems Jaisa Maine Jana Hai and Aatmadarsh. His book Fresh Brew – Chronicles of Business and Freedom, co-authored with Amit Haralalka, traces the careers of 25 IIM Lucknow alumni who turned entrepreneurs. His book Cyber Crime (Hindi साइबर क्राइम) co-authored with S H Zaidi is possibly the first book on Cyber Crime in Hindi.

== Azad Adhikar Sena ==
Azad Adhikar Sena (आजाद अधिकार सेना in Hindi), also known by its short name AAS (आस in Hindi), is an unregistered political party in India, which is presently undergoing the process of registration before the Election Commission of India. It was initiated by Amitabh Thakur, his wife Dr Nutan Thakur and others in August 2021. The process stopped after Amitabh's arrest. Its formation was resumedafter his release from Jail in March 2022.

In June 2022, the formation of Adhikar Sena was again announced. He said the primary aim of Adhikar Sena is to instill the feeling and concept that all the powers (Adhikar) and authorities lie in the citizen of India, as bestowed through the Constitution of India and various laws of the Land. Currently, the Party is in process of getting registered in Election Commission of India.

The Basic philosophy of Azad Adhikar Sena is Belief in Democratic Values and Constitution of India and Belief in Power of the Individual (Aam Nagrik ka Adhikar).

After its formation, Azad Adhikar Sena has been expanding and working in various areas of India, with particular focus on Uttar Pradesh. It has been making its presence felt through various interventions.

== Personal life ==
Amitabh Thakur is married to political and social activist Dr Nutan Thakur. His brother is Avinash Kumar, an IAS officer in Jharkhand.

Amitabh has two children – a daughter named Tanaya and a son named Aditya, both law graduates. While Tanaya graduated from National Law University Patna, Aditya graduated from National Law University Lucknow. Tanaya is married to Vineet Kumar, an Indian Foreign Service officer.

== See also ==
- Nutan Thakur, Advocate, activist and active member, Azad Adhikar Sena
