= Dinu Solanki =

Indian politician (born 1958)

Dinubhai Boghabhai Solanki (born 1958) was a politician from Gir Somnath, Gujarat. Solanki won the Gujarat Legislative assembly seat from Kodinar in 2002 with a margin of 2,000 votes, and in 2009 was elected to the 15th Lok Sabha after defeating his Indian National Congress rival Jashubhai Dhanabhai Barad by a margin of 1.8%.

== Biography ==
He had declared assets of nearly Rs. 20 million in 2009. He has a history of criminal charges and has complaints registered against him under Sections 323, 324, 325, 143, 147, 148, 149 and 504 of the Indian Penal Code. He also has a history of intimidating police officers investigating his criminal connections.

He has transport business with Ambuja Cements Ltd and many other business associated with Ambuja Cements Ltd.

According to the Times of India, Solanki controls local Kodinar municipality and other important bodies. In 2010, the ruling dispension congress has tried every penny to fabricate him. He has done many social work for the welfare of his community. He belongs to Karadiya Rajput community. The former MP was convicted in murder of RTI activist Amit Jethwa and sentenced for life imprisonment by the Ahmedabad CBI court. After Solanki's supporters decided to contest as independent candidates, BJP suspended five of his supporters from the party for six years.
