= Renu C. Laskar =

Indian-born American mathematician (1932–2024)

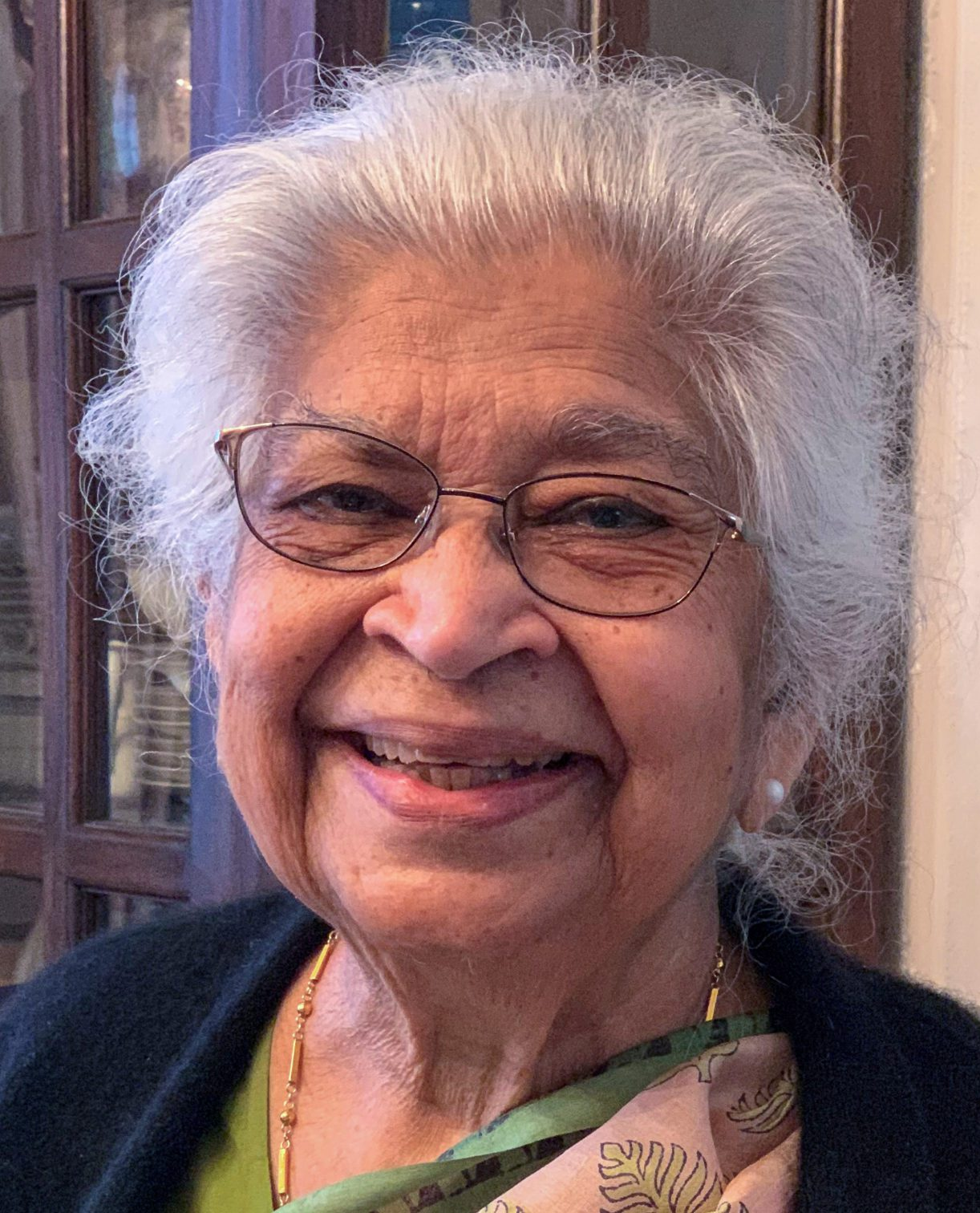
- Laskar in 2023
- Born: Renu Chakravarti Laskar; August 8, 1932; Bihar, India
- Died: September 17, 2024 (aged 92); Mountain View, California, U.S.

Academic background
- Education: B. R. Ambedkar Bihar University, University of Illinois at Urbana-Champaign
- Doctoral advisor: Henry Roy Brahana

Academic work
- Discipline: Mathematics
- Sub-discipline: Graph theory
- Institutions: Indian Institute of Technology Kharagpur, University of North Carolina at Chapel Hill, Clemson University

Renu Chakravarti Laskar (August 8, 1932 – September 17, 2024) was an Indian-born American mathematician, specializing in graph theory. She was a professor in the Department of Mathematical Sciences at Clemson University from 1968 to 2006. She received her Ph.D. in mathematics from the University of Illinois at Urbana-Champaign in 1962. Laskar's life was marked by a personal loss when her husband, Amulya L. Laskar, a distinguished professor of physics, died in 1991. His obituary in The New York Times recognized his contributions to physics and his role at Clemson University.

Laskar has often contributed to the theory of domination number and circular arc graphs. She wrote four papers with Paul Erdős, giving her an Erdős number of 1.

== Early life and education ==
Renu C. Laskar was born in Bihar, India on August 8, 1932. With the help of her family support, she finished her schooling and college, which wasn't much accessible to the women that time due to the cultural norms prevalent in India. It was during that time, when she discovered her talent for mathematics. Her pursuit of mathematics was influenced by her mother, who, after confronting the limitations of her own lack of formal education, learned multiple languages and advocated for her daughters' education. Laskar, not allowed to attend college due to her father's reservations, continued her studies at home with the assistance of tutors. She distinguished herself by scoring the highest in Bihar on her bachelor's degree examination.

This led to a teaching offer at Ranchi Women’s College, and subsequently, a Fulbright Scholarship allowed her to travel to the United States in 1958. At the University of Illinois at Urbana-Champaign, she achieved her doctorate under the guidance of Roy Brahana and became the first Indian woman to do so at the institution. After earning her Ph.D., she married Amulya Lal Laskar, a physicist she met while studying in Illinois.

She finished her master's degree in mathematics from B. R. Ambedkar Bihar University in 1955. Upon finishing college, Laskar, with strong encouragement from her elder brother, decided to come to the United States to pursue her Ph.D. in 1958. She studied for her Ph.D. at the University of Illinois at Urbana-Champaign under her advisor Henry Roy Brahana and graduated in 1962. She was the first female Indian to receive a Ph.D. in mathematics from UIUC. She returned to India and joined the Indian Institute of Technology Kharagpur as the first female faculty member at the institute.

In 1965, Laskar moved back to the United States at the University of North Carolina at Chapel Hill, and then joined the faculty at Clemson University in 1968.

== Academic life ==
Laskar took full advantage of the opportunities she had and set new standards for women in mathematics. She ranks among the top women in discrete mathematics in the number of articles published. According to MathSciNet, she has over 100 publications. Part of the reason for her success in this area was her collaboration network, which included Raj Chandra Bose and Paul Erdős. She extended her influence by supervising Ph.D. students, even after her retirement in 2006. In 1986, Laskar and Steve Hedetniemi organized the Clemson University Discrete Math Miniconference, an event that has drawn an international audience each year since.

Reflecting on her career, Laskar emphasized the value of academic relationships, both in her research and personal life, noting that many of her colleagues, including Erdős, were guests in her home. Her dedication to mathematics and education was accompanied by a fondness for teaching and the opportunity to mentor students and collaborate with peers. She has credited Clemson University with providing her a platform to excel and contribute to her field.

== Death ==
Laskar died from complications of a stroke in Mountain View, California, on September 17, 2024, at the age of 92. She is survived by her son Joy Laskar, Daughter-In-Law Devi Laskar in California, and her son Raja Laskar and Daughter-In-Law Shilpi Laskar in Georgia and six grandchildren in California and Georgia.
