= Kodinar =

- Town
- Location in Gujarat, India Kodinar (India)
- Coordinates: 20.86°N 70.80°E
- Country: India
- State: Gujarat
- District: Gir Somnath

Population (2011)
  - Total: 41,492

Languages
  - Official: Gujarati
- Time zone: UTC+5:30 (IST)
- Postal code: 362720
- Vehicle registration: GJ 32
- Website: gujaratindia.com

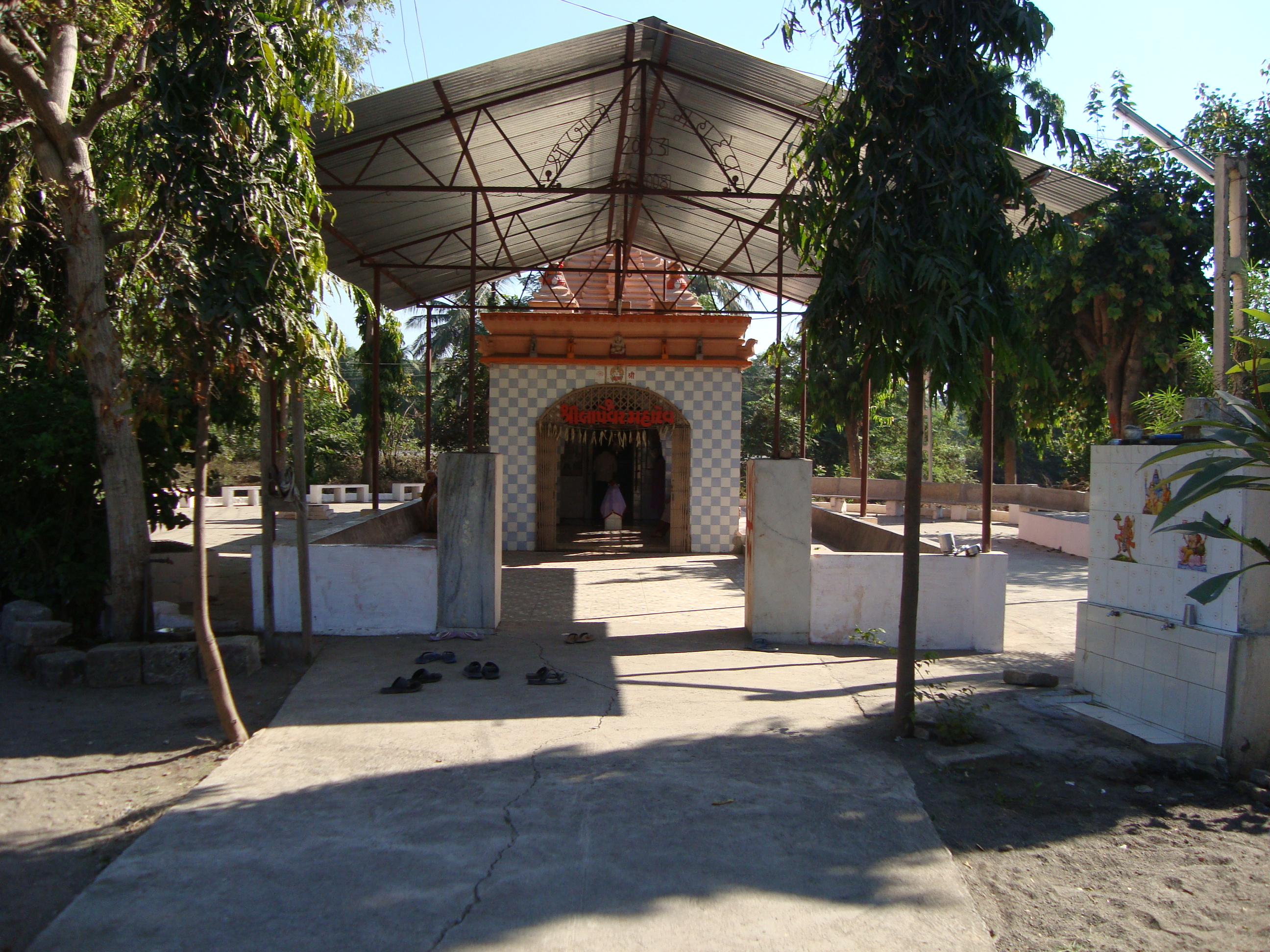
A Shrine in Kodinar

Kodinar is a town and municipality in Gir Somnath district, in the Indian state of Gujarat, 37 kilometres (23 miles) west of Una. Kodinar is close to the Gir Forest National Park. The main transport connections for Kodinar are Diu Airport, Veraval Junction railway station, and Veraval Port.

== Demographics ==
As of 2011 India census, Kodinar—a Taluka in the Gir Somnath district—contains 64 villages. Kodinar has a population of around 21,111 male and 20,381 female. The female sex ratio is 965 against state average of 919. Moreover, the child sex ratio in Kodinar is around 908 compared to Gujarat state average of 890. Kodinar has an average literacy rate of 80.11%. Male literacy is around 86.57% while the female literacy rate is 73.47%. 11.89% of the population is under six years old.

== Tourism ==
=== Mul Dwarka ===
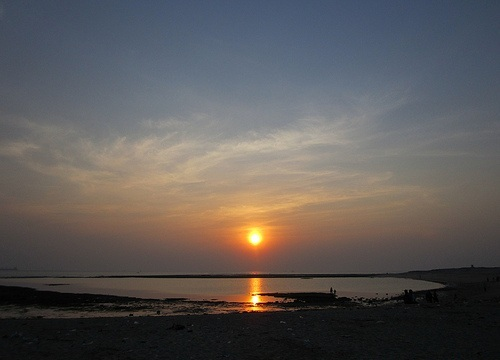
Ancient city of Mul Dwarka

Mul Dwarka (Kodinar), a small coastal village near Kodinar in the district of Gir Somnath, Gujarat State is one of the three claimants of the original Dwarka of Mahabharata. The proximity with hills on the north and sea on the south the town has been associated with all three Dwarkas (Sankalia, 1966). Lord Sri Krishna and Lord Balarama are supposed to have stayed here for sometime before moving to Dwarka.

The remains of ancient port of Mul Dwarka have been much destroyed due to the construction of cement jetty. A tidal river, blocked by a sand-bar that may be caused by a cement jetty, flows on the western side of Mul Dwarka village.

Archaeological findings from Mul Dwarka suggest that this area was an ancient settlement. Discovery of a composite stone anchor and report on some grapnel type anchors from Mul Dwarka support the view that this was an active port in medieval period and earlier. The artifacts found in and around this place date back to the 10th century AD and older as far back to the ages of Harappan and late Harappan settlements.

An ancient temple of Lord Shree Krishna is situated on a raised land close to the sea. This small temple is in a dilapidated condition. The shrine is dated to the post 10th century AD (Sampura, 1968). And the Gujarat Government is planning a massive renovation of this temple complex. Kusheshwara Mahadev temple or Siddheshwar Mahadev temple, Bheedbhanjan Mahadev temple and Khodiyar Mataji temple are located nearby.

A medieval age well is still used for drinking water source near the jetty.

=== Kaj ===
Kaj is 10 km east of Kodinar, on the Dwarka highway. Kaj has evidence of late Harappan settlements. An ancient mound is just 2–3 km east of the present village. It hosts Siberian birds that visit annually, providing a fresh water sanctuary. Archaeological explorations found many ceramic artifacts, including bowls from the Harappan period.

Archaeological findings were very similar to those from ancient Dwarka and Somnath. All this indicates the existence of a Harappan civilization near the bank of the creek.

Among the large number of Harappan pottery fragments, two large amphorae fragments suggest that Kaj might have been an ancient port on the mid Saurashtra-Kathiyawad coast, trading with boats from other countries—particularly between Bet Dwarka (Gaur et al. 2005b and 2006) and Hathab (Pramanik, 2004). Topographical features indicate that in the past the ancient site of Kaj might have been approached through the sea route.

=== Kanjotar ===
Kanjotar (near Muldwarka) is another coastal village that began as a historical settlement. Two mounds are near this village: one on the east side of the village, with a temple dedicated to Mahakali; and another about 2 km west of the village.

Both entire mounds are under cultivation. A large quantity of Bronze Age pottery has been collected, which confirms a settlement in that period. Local residents say that digging house foundations has revealed many pottery fragments and structures. Archaeologists consider Kanjotar to be a Harappan port on the mid-Saurashtra. Exploration of the site found an ancient rock-cut step well near this settlement that may be contemporary to the site.

Surface exploration found a terracotta wheel with a projection for a hub, probably from a toy cart. Other discoveries include an Indo-Arabian type limestone anchor under 4 m of water. It is broken, leaving only an upper portion with a circular hole. It is similar to those from other sites on the Saurashtra coast.

== Political issues ==
The president of Kodinar Municipality, Shiva Solanki—who belongs to the Bharatiya Janata Party—was arrested in connection with the murder of Amit Jethwa, a RTI activist who had filed a PIL against illegal mining in the Gir Forests. Jethwa was shot dead on 20 July 2010. Solanki is nephew of Kodinar's MLA Dinu Solanki.
