= Indian Communist Party =

The Indian Communist Party was a small communist group in India, led by U. Krishnappa from Karnataka. In May 1985 ICP merged into the Communist Organisation of India (Marxist–Leninist).
