= Azad Adhikar Sena =

Political party in India

- Abbreviation: AAS
- President: Amitabh Thakur
- Founder: Amitabh Thakur, Dr Nutan Thakur and others
- Founded: 23 July 2022; 4 years ago
- Headquarters: 5/426, Viram Khand, Gomtinagar, Lucknow -226010
- Student wing: AAS Chhatra Brigade
- Youth wing: AAS Yuva Brigade
- Women's wing: AAS Mahila Brigade
- Ideology: Populism
- Political position: Right wing to far-right
- Colours: Pink White
- ECI status: Unrecognised party
- Seats in Rajya Sabha: 0 / 245
- Seats in Lok Sabha: 0 / 543
- Seats in Uttar Pradesh Legislative Assembly: 0 / 403
- Seats in Uttar Pradesh Legislative Council: 0 / 100
- Number of states and union territories in government: 0 / 31

Election symbol
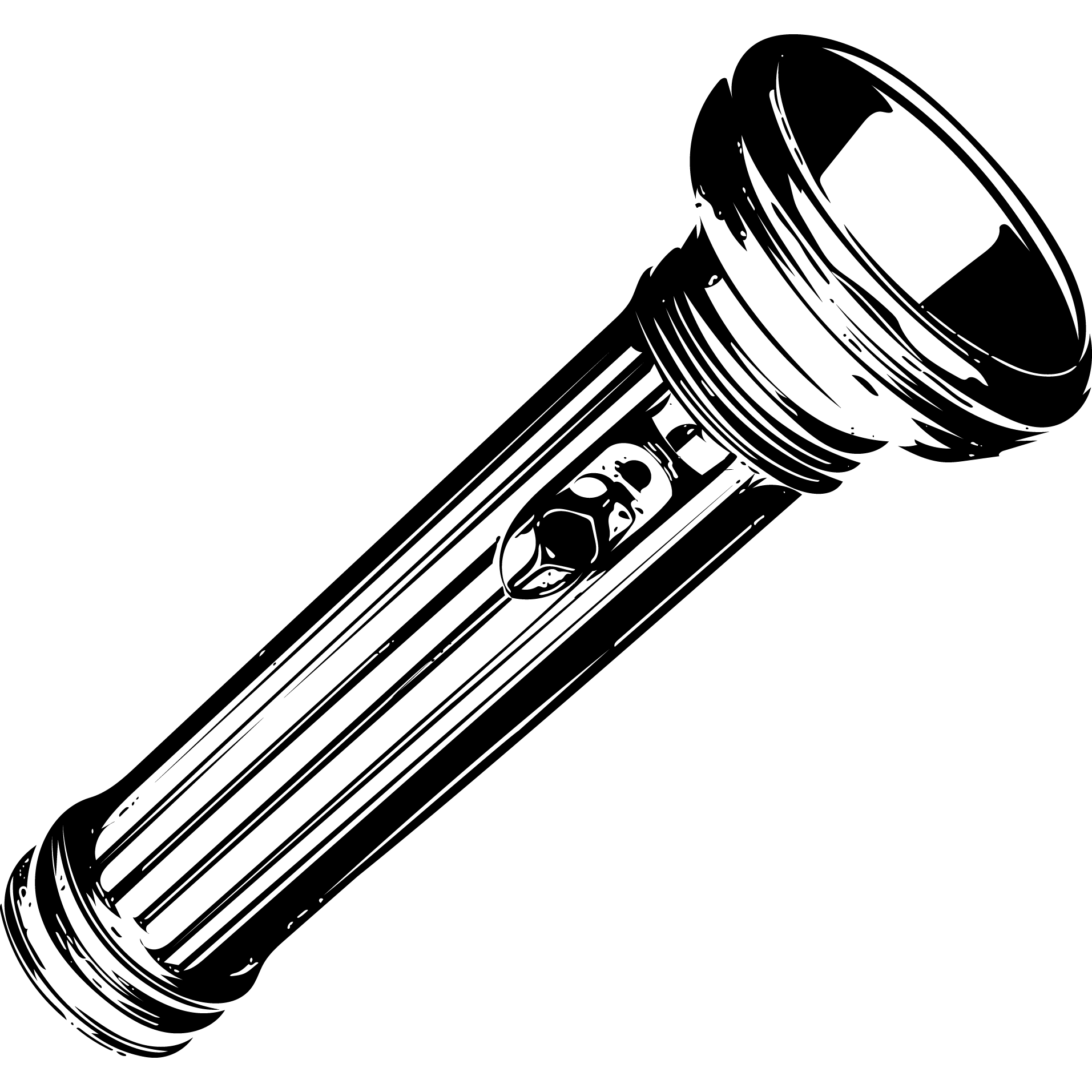

Website
- adhikarsena.in

Azad Adhikar Sena (AAS) is an unregistered political party in India, which is presently undergoing the process of registration before the Election Commission of India. It was initiated by Amitabh Thakur, his wife Dr Nutan Thakur and others in August 2021. The process stopped after Amitabh's arrest. Its formation was resumedafter his release from Jail in March 2022.

In June 2022, the formation of Adhikar Sena was again announced. He said the primary aim of Adhikar Sena is to instill the feeling and concept that all the powers (Adhikar) and authorities lie in the citizen of India, as bestowed through the Constitution of India and various laws of the Land. Currently, the Party is in process of getting registered in Election Commission of India.

The Basic philosophy of Azad Adhikar Sena is Belief in Democratic Values and Constitution of India and Belief in Power of the Individual (Aam Nagrik ka Adhikar).

After its formation, Azad Adhikar Sena has been expanding and working in various areas of India, with particular focus on Uttar Pradesh. It has been making its presence felt through various interventions.

As per the Party website, the primary aim of Azad Adhikar Sena is "to instill in each citizen of India the feeling and concept that all the powers (Adhikar) and authorities lie in them". It believes that the rights of the citizen vis-à-vis the Executive lie superior.

== History ==
Azad Adhikar Sena was started by ex IPS officer Amitabh Thakur, activist Dr Nutan Thakur, along with others in August 2021.

Immediately thereafter, Thakur was arrested in a criminal case, which he alleged to be politically motivated.

== Resumption ==
Later, Thakur resumed the work of initiating the formation of Adhikar Sena after his release from jail in March 2022.

In June 2022, the formation of Adhikar Sena was again announced. He said the primary aim of Adhikar Sena is to instill the feeling and concept that all the powers and authorities lie in the citizen of India, as bestowed through the Constitution of India and various laws of the Land. The Party submitted its proposal for getting registered with the Election Commission of India on 21 December 2022.

== Change of name and registration ==
In May 2022, the Election Commission changed the Party's name from Adhikar Sena to Azad Adhikar Sena. The Party got registered under section 29A of the Representation of the People Act 1951 on 29 February 2024.

== Various works ==
Thakur announced that he would contest 2024 Lok Sabha elections from Ballia, though it did not actually happen.

Adhikar Sena participated in the December 2022 Uttar Pradesh Assembly by-elections, where two of its candidates contested from Khatauli and Rampur assembly seats. It has since then participated in various elections but with no success.

Its President Amitabh Thakur was arrested in the night of 10 December 2025 at Shahjahanpur railway station in a 26 years old case related with Deoria district, which led to multiple demonstrations by the Party.

== Leadership ==
List of Party Presidents
S.No.	Portrait	Name (Birth–Death)	Term in office		
S.No.	Portrait	Name (Birth–Death)	Assumed office	Left office	Time in office
1		Amitabh Thakur (b. 16 Jun 1968)	23 July 2022	Incumbent	4 years, 3 months and 21 days
