= NDTV Indian of the Year =

NDTV's Indian of the Year
- Country: India
- Presented by: NDTV
- First award: 2005

NDTV Indian of the Year (IOY) is the annual award given by the NDTV group.

== Winners of the Award ==
Ceremony	Year	Indian	Politics	Sports	Business	Entertainment	Global Indian
1st	2005	Sonia Gandhi	Sonia Gandhi			Amitabh Bachchan	
2nd	2006		Manmohan Singh			Sanjay Dutt	
3rd	2007	Indian Soldiers	Manmohan Singh	Viswanathan Anand	Mukesh Ambani	Rajinikanth and Shah Rukh Khan	Rajendra K. Pachauri
4th	2008	Team Chandrayaan	Sheila Dikshit	Abhinav Bindra	Deepak Parikh	Aamir Khan	Cast of Slumdog Millionaire
5th	2009	Nitish Kumar	Nitish Kumar	Saina Nehwal	Anand Mahindra	Ranbir Kapoor and Priyanka Chopra	
6th	2010	Sachin Tendulkar	Nitish Kumar	Leander Paes		Rajinikanth and Trisha Krishnan	
7th	2011	Anna Hazare and Arvind Kejriwal	Shivraj Singh Chauhan	Mahendra Singh Dhoni		Cast of Zindagi Na Milegi Dobara	
8th	2013	Nirbhaya (anonymous name of the victim of 2012 Delhi gang rape and murder		Gagan Narang and Yogeshwar Dutt	Natarajan Chandrasekaran	Sridevi and Kareena Kapoor	
9th	2014	Amjad Ali Khan and Satish Gujral	Election Commission of India	P. V. Sindhu	Rajiv Bajaj and Roshni Nadar	Kangana Ranaut, Deepika Padukone and Ranbir Kapoor	
10th	2015	Siddharth Narayan		Sania Mirza and Saina Nehwal	Dilip Shanghvi	Ranveer Singh, Deepika Padukone, and Irrfan Khan	Satya Nadella
11th	2023	Women of India	Amitabh Kant	Shafali Verma, Sneh Rana, Shreyanka Patil, and Radha Yadav	Natarajan Chandrasekaran	Sunny Deol and Vikrant Massey	
12th	2024	Polling Booth Officers	Subrahmanyam Jaishankar	Paralympians of India	Roshni Nadar	Raj Kumar Rao and Ananya Pandey and Kapil Sharma	
13th	2025	Indian armed forces		India women's national cricket team	Sunil Vachani	Vicky Kaushal and Jahnvi Kapoor	

=== Seventh NDTV Indian of the Year ===
The Seventh NDTV Indian of the Year was held at the Taj Palace Hotel on 18 October 2011. The winners were:

- Indian of the Year – Anna Hazare and Arvind Kejriwal
- India's Heroes – India national cricket team
- Entertainer of the Year (Movie) – Zindagi Na Milegi Dobara
- Entertainer of the Year (Music) – Shankar–Ehsaan–Loy
- Lifetime Achievement Award – Dev Anand and Rahul Dravid
- LIC Unsung Hero of the Year – RTI activists Amit Jethwa, Dattatreya Patil, Vishram Dodiya, Satish Shetty and Vitthal Gite
- Transformational Idea of the Year Award – Nandan Nilekani
- Icon of India – N. R. Narayana Murthy

=== Eighth NDTV Indian of the Year ===
The Eighth NDTV Indian of the Year was held on 15 April 2013 dedicated to the Daughters of India and celebrating the 25th Silver Jubilee of the news channel. The winners were:

- Daughter of India – Nirbhaya
- Justice for the Indian Woman – Justice J. S. Verma Committee
- Entertainer of the Year – Sridevi
- Entertainer of the Decade – Kareena Kapoor
- Lifetime Achievement Award – Yash Chopra and Pandit Ravi Shankar and Prathap C. Reddy
- LIC Unsung Hero of the Year – Rajni Sekhri Sibal
- Sportspersons the Year Award – Gagan Narang and Yogeshwar Dutt
- Achievement in Health – Apollo Group

=== Ninth NDTV Indian of the Year ===
The Ninth NDTV Indian of the Year Award Ceremony was held on 29 April 2014.

- Lifetime Achievement Award - Amjad Ali Khan and Satish Gujral
- Business leader of the year - Rajiv Bajaj
- Sportsperson of the year - P. V. Sindhu
- Actor of the year- Kangana Ranaut
- Bollywood youth icon of the year - Ranbir Kapoor
- Entertainer of the year - Deepika Padukone

The other winners include T. Raja of New Ark Mission of India.

== See also ==
- CNN-News18 Indian of the Year
