= Satish Shetty =

- Born: July 21, 1970
- Died: January 13, 2010 (aged 39)
- Cause of death: murder

Satish Shetty (21 July 1970 – 13 January 2010), popularly known as "Satish", was an Indian social activist, noted for exposing many land scams in Maharashtra. He had used the Right to Information Act to expose irregularities in Government offices in the last five years. He was killed on 13 January 2010, by unknown attackers in Talegaon.

== Background and killing ==
In recent years, Shetty had used the RTI Act to expose large scale land scams involving the leading real estate firm IRB Infrastructure and its subsidiary Aryan. In 2009, he filed a complaint that forged documents had been used by these firms to acquire large swathes of land in the Taje and Pimploli villages off the Pune-Mumbai highway. After investigations, 90 sale deeds were cancelled, and sub-registrar Ashwini Kshirsagar was suspended. The company blamed land brokers for the irregularities, and the planned IRB township project was eventually scrapped.

After this episode, Shetty started getting threat calls. In November 2009, he filed a request with the Pune rural police seeking protection. In the request, he said that he had been receiving threats allegedly originating with Virendra Mhaiskar, chairman of IRB Infrastructure. Protection was not granted.

In January 2010, Shetty was knifed by several people while he was at a kiosk reading a paper after his morning walk.

The subsequent police investigations proposed a different theory for the murder, ignoring the IRB infrastructure association. Eventually the case was transferred to the CBI.

In October 2012, CBI raided the offices of IRB Infrastructure and that of IRB advocate Ajit Kulkarni. In January 2013, CBI obtained permission to conduct polygraph tests on Mhaiskar, his attorney Kulkarni, and eight others, leading to a 15% drop in the company's share price. Stocks regained 3% after it was said that the polygraph tests of Mhaiskar may not have revealed any incriminating aspects.

== Recognition ==
He was given posthumously the Sajag Nagrik Award, which was received by his brother Sandeep at a function held in Pune

National RTI Forum has honoured his martyrdom by naming an award after him as Satish Shetty RTI Gallantry award.

In 2011 he was posthumously awarded the NDTV Indian of the Year's LIC Unsung Hero of the Year Award with other RTI activists Amit Jethwa, Dattatreya Patil, Vishram Dodiya and Vitthal Gite

== See also ==
- Attacks on RTI Activist in India
