= Liberation Front (Sabuj Sen) =

The Liberation Front was a communist Naxal splinter faction in India. The leader was Sabuj Sen.

The party later merged with Communist Organisation of India (Marxist-Leninist).
