= Amit Jethwa =

Indian environmentalist and social worker(1975–2010)

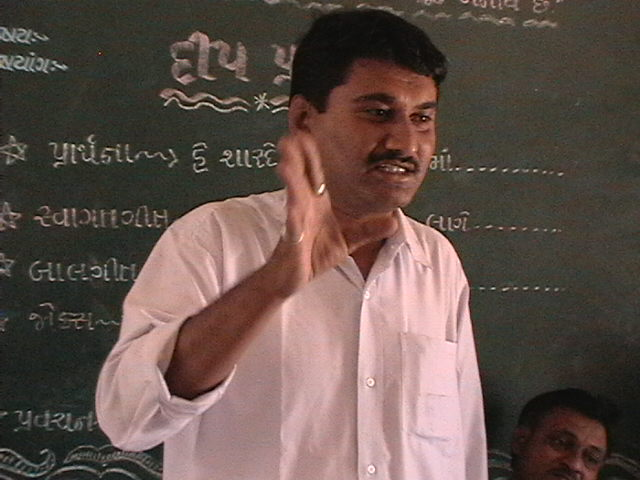
- Amit Jethwa
- Born: 31 December 1975; Khambha, Gujarat
- Died: 20 July 2010 (aged 34); High Court complex, Ahmedabad
- Cause of death: Killed by gunshot (Contract Killing)
- Other name: Amit Jethava
- Education: D.Pharm, B.A., LLb
- Known for: Environmentalism
- Children: Arjun Jethwa Aarohi Jethwa
- Father: Bhikhubhai Jethva(Batawala)

Amit Jethwa (also Amit Jethava) (31 December 1975 – 20 July 2010) was an Indian environmentalist and social worker, active in the Gir Forest area near Junagadh, Gujarat. He had filed several court cases against illegal mining in the protected area, naming politician Dinu Solanki as one of the respondents. On 20 July 2010 he was shot dead by two assailants on a motorbike. In September 2012, the Gujarat High Court, severely criticized investigations by the Gujarat police who had "given a clean chit" to Solanki, despite arresting his nephew; the court ordered the Central Bureau of Investigations (CBI) to take up the case. In November 2013, CBI arrested Dinu Solanki in connection with having ordered the murder. On 11 July 2019, Dinu Solanki and his nephew Shiva Solanki were convicted of the murder, and sentenced to life imprisonment.

== Career ==
As the president of the Gir Nature Youth Club at Khambha, Amit Jethwa had been active in fighting against encroachment of forests and poaching. He was also instrumental in the five-year jail term of Bollywood actor Salman Khan for shooting an endangered Chinkara deer, a case that concluded after being pursued by activists for eight years. He also highlighted the use of a Chinkara deer in a scene in the movie Lagaan and opposed a Bhuj court decision which stayed an inquiry against the actor-director Aamir Khan.

He campaigned vigorously against corruption among officers of the Indian Forest Service, and opposed malafide application of article 356 of the. In 2007, he drew attention to the mysterious deaths of lions in Gir Forest including three that were shot within a few hundred meters of the Babariya forest guard outpost. Claiming that "Such a thing cannot be possible without support of some forest officials", Jethwa sought the suspension of an IFS officer. The incident ultimately led to the uncovering of a large lion poaching gang. He later campaigned against shifting of lions to the Kuno Wildlife Sanctuary in Madhya Pradesh. His efforts were often blocked by forest officials by charging him with offenses such as photographing a dead lion and trespassing.

In 2007, Jethwa contested the state assembly elections, but lost.

In 2008, Jethwa pursued the Right to Information Act for addressing grievances, and conducted workshops on the procedure to file requests under RTI to prevent corrupt practices and other mal-administration.

In 2010, Jethwa had filed a PIL petition questioning the state government's "inaction" over the appointment of a Lokayukta. The high court directed the government to appoint a Lokayukta. Jethwa had spearheaded the campaign against rising case pendency in the Gujarat Information Commission (GIC) due to lack of commissioners. It was on his petition that the HC directed the state government to complete the appointments within a stipulated time. He again came to the rescue of thousands of RTI users by filing a writ petition in the HC and made the government accept Indian Postal Order (IPO) as one of the modes of payment to deposit fees while filing of RTI applications.

=== Investigations against illegal mining lobby ===
Since 2008, Jethwa had filed six requests under the Right to Information Act, probing the activities of an illegal mining lobby operating in the protected forest area just outside the Gir Forest National Park. At the time, Jethwa was badly beaten up by goons, allegedly sent by Solanki .

In mid-2010, he filed a Public interest litigation in the Gujarat High Court, citing evidence found, and naming local politician Dinu Solanki and several relatives, for involvement in the illegal mining in the Gir Forest. He sought directives from the court for stopping power supply to all such mining centers.

In June 2010, a raid was conducted by the police and geology departments, and a number of mining equipment were seized. However, the equipment was subsequently stolen back. Dinu Bhai was issued a show-cause notice for imposing a penalty of RS 4.1 million on him.

He appealed that the matter be investigated by an independent ombudsman or Lokayukta, a constitutional position that had been lying vacant in Gujarat since 2003. He had recently moved court to seek a judicial order to the state government to fill this post.

=== Assassination ===
On 20 July, shortly after the case against Solanki was filed, Jethwa had gone to meet his lawyer near the Gujarat High court in Ahmedabad. As he was leaving the Satyamev complex, two assailants on a motorcycle shot him at close range with a country-made pistol. Despite being injured, he apparently tried to detain the assailants. Though they were able to get away, he was able to grab a kurta (long shirt) worn by one of the murderers; this had a laundry tag leading to Junagadh. A police car was parked outside the court, and two policemen came out on hearing the single gunshot but failed to pursue the criminals, who escaped on foot.

Jethwa's family has alleged that he was under constant threat from Dinu Solanki for interfering with the powerful and illegal mining lobby in Saurashtra. At one point Solanki threatened him in front of a large gathering at a meeting in Kodinar, the area Solanki hails from. Jethwa had recently filed an affidavit at the Kodinar police station seeking protection and stating that he would be killed by Solanki. His father recently received a threatening phone call from Dinu Solanki.

A number of civil bodies and NGOs held a vigil in Ahmedabad on 21 July, seeking an independent investigation.

=== Dinu Solanki arrested ===
During investigations, the police arrested constable Bahadursinh Wadher and then Pachan Silva, who was allegedly one of the hired killers. Later, on 6 September 2010, they arrested Shiva Solanki, nephew of Dinu Solanki, as the main accused in the case. According to police sources, Shiva had asked constable Bahadursinh to get Amit Jethawa eliminated. "Bahadur then planned the crime and executed it with the help of sharpshooters Shailesh Pandya and Pachan Shiva."

Despite the murder occurring within months of Jethwa's case naming Dinu Solanki, and also the arrest of his nephew, investigations by Gujarat Police crime branch had ruled out any role for Solanki himself. In September 2012, the Gujarat High Court heard an appeal in this matter by Amit Jethwa's father, and severely criticised the investigations by the Gujarat Police. The court commented that the investigations had been "far from fair, independent, bona fide or prompt.", and that Shiva Solanki and Dinu were living in the same joint family, and had very likely had some interactions. In similar cases, the Gujarat Police has been widely criticised for being extraordinarily politicised. The High Court directed that the case be transferred to the CBI.

In November 2013, Dinu Solanki was arrested by the CBI.

== Awards ==
- 2010 (posthumous) Satish Shetty RTI Gallantry Award from National RTI Forum, a voluntary organisation working in the field of transparency.
- 2010 (posthumous) special jury award from NDTV environmental awards "the greenies".
- 2011 (posthumous) NDTV Indian of the Year's LIC Unsung Hero of the Year Award with other RTI activists Dattatreya Patil, Vishram Dodiya, Satish Shetty and Vitthal Gite

== See also ==
- Attacks on RTI Activists in India
