= Nutan Thakur =

Indian writer (born 1973)

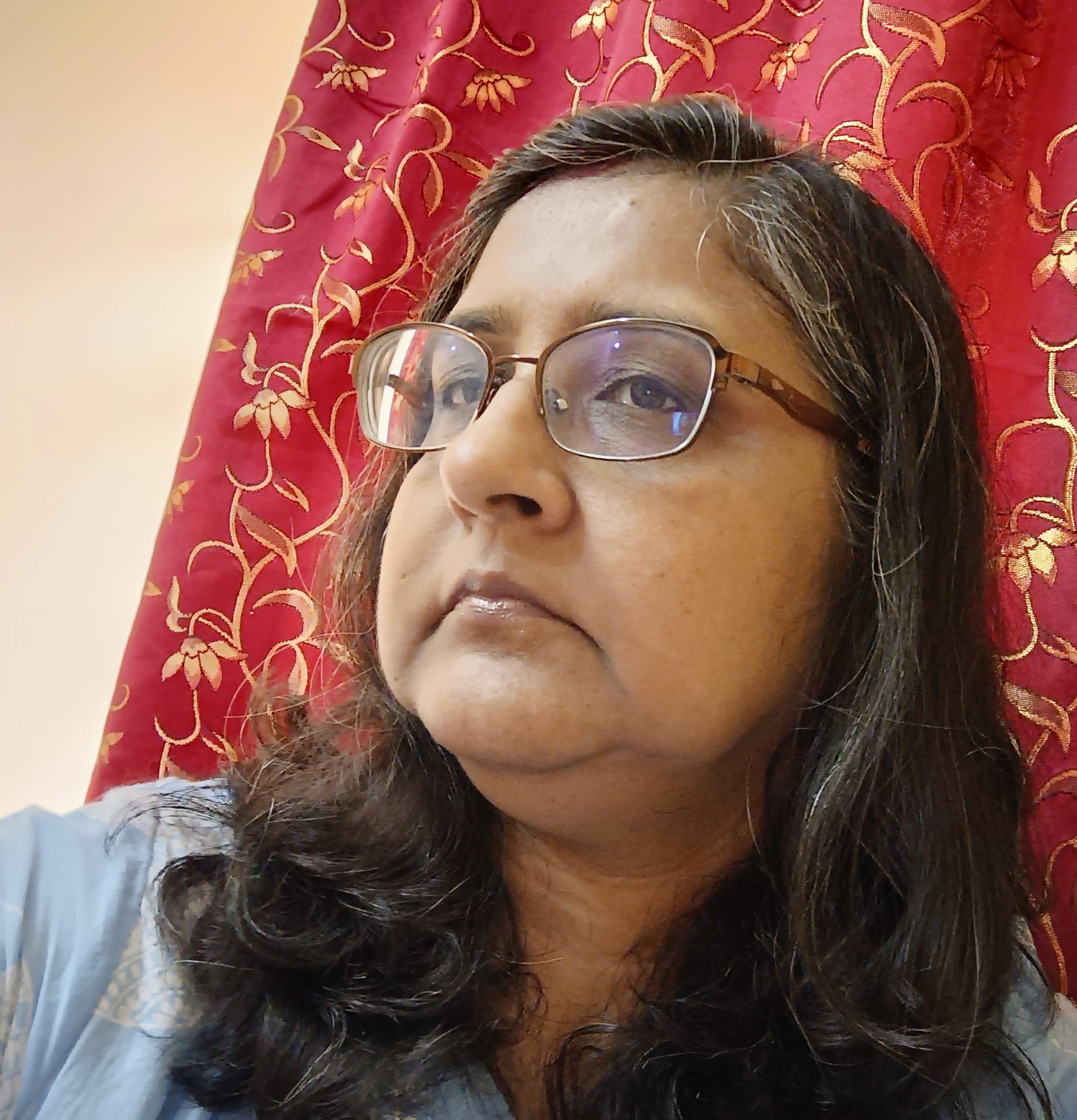
- Born: 11 July 1973 (age 53); Hajipur, Bihar, India
- Education: Doctor of Philosophy, Doctor of Literature
- Alma mater: Mahant Darshan Das Mahila College Muzaffarpur, Bihar University
- Occupations: Social activist, journalist and writer
- Organization: National RTI Forum
- Known for: Public Interest Litigation
- Political party: Azad Adhikar Sena (2022)
- Spouse: Amitabh Thakur (m. 1993)
- Children: Tanaya Thakur; Aditya Thakur
- Parents: Kameshwar Prasad Singh (father); Bibha Devi (mother)
- Relatives: Avinash Kumar- Brother in law- IAS Officer, Jharkhand Cadre

Nutan Thakur (born 11 July 1973), a former journalist, is a social and political activist from Lucknow, Uttar Pradesh, associated with a registered political party Azad Adhikar Sena, being led by her husband ex IPS officer Amitabh Thakur. She is also an advocate primary working in Lucknow bench of Allahabad High court.

== Career ==
Originally from Bihar, Nutan begin her social career as Secretary of Institute for Research and Documentation in social sciences, IRDS, a post she held from 1996 to early 2010. IRDS was a society registered under Societies Registration Act, 1860, primarily working in research and documentation in various fields of social sciences including human rights, legal rights, political rights, education, women rights, health rights and so on. She, along with her husband Amitabh Thakur also initiated National RTI Forum, which was involved with various facets related with Right to information act (RTI), including protests, judicial interventions, advocacy etc.

Nutan entered the field of public interest litigation around 2011 and filed around a hundred briefs on different topics, particularly in Lucknow bench of Allahabad High Court, many of which resulted in important interventions being taken by the High court for the betterment of society and for checking the Mal administration and improperties of the government. She entered political arena by joining as a member of Aam Aadmi Party, (AAP) and was among one of her earliest members, but she resigned after serious allegations being labelled against the party. She joined AAP again in 2017 but resigned in 2022, citing her displeasure on the functioning of Uttar Pradesh unit of AAP. Later she joined Adhikar Sena and is presently General Secretary of this party. She also pursued the cause of awarding Padma awards to Manjunath Shanmugam and Satyendra Dubey, two bright, young and dedicated young persons who had fought against corruption and were murdered in the way.

== Personal life ==
Nutan Thakur is married to Amitabh Thakur, an ex IPS officer and President, Azad Adhikar Sena. Her brother in law is Avinash Kumar, an IAS officer in Jharkhand. Nutan has two children - a daughter named Tanaya and a son named Aditya, both law graduates. While Tanaya graduated from National Law University Patna, Aditya graduated from National Law University Lucknow. Tanaya is married to Vineet Kumar, an Indian Foreign Service officer.

== See also ==
- Amitabh Thakur, ex IPS officer and President, Azad Adhikar Sena
