= Central Organising Committee, Communist Party of India (Marxist–Leninist) (Umadhar Singh) =

- Leader: Umadhar Singh
- Dissolved: 1985
- Split from: CPI(ML) (Satyanarayan Singh group)
- Merged into: Communist Organisation of India (Marxist-Leninist)
- Ideology: Marxism-Leninism
- Bihar Legislative Assembly (1985): 1 / 324

The Central Organising Committee, Communist Party of India (Marxist–Leninist) was a communist party led by Umadhar Singh, active in the early 1980s. The party was briefly represented in the Bihar Legislative Assembly.

== Background ==
Umadhar Singh had been a member of Satyanarayan Singh's CPI(ML), before founding his own party. Singh's influence extended over the Hayaghat and Darbhanga areas of Bihar.

== 1985 election and merger into COI(ML) ==
Singh contested the March 1985 election, and won the Hayaghat seat in the Bihar Legislative Assembly. Soon after the election, Singh's party merged into the Communist Organisation of India (Marxist–Leninist).
