= Notion Press =

Indian book publishing company

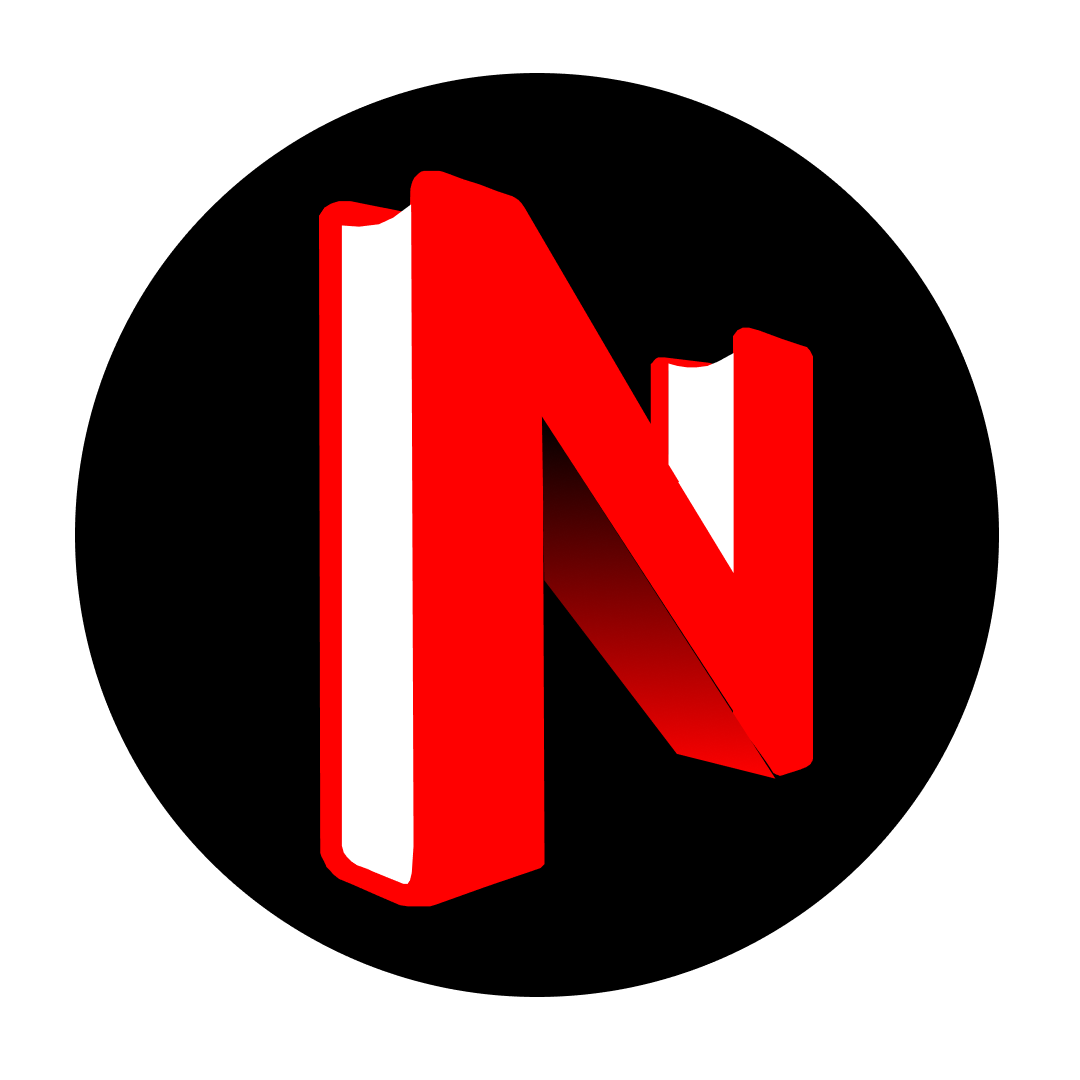
- Company type: Private
- Industry: Self-publishing
- Founded: 2012
- Headquarters: Chennai, India
- Key people: Bhargava Adepally; Naveen Valsakumar; Jana Pillay
- Products: Books
- Website: notionpress.com

Notion Press is an Indian book publisher company based in Chennai, India. It was founded in 2012, and in 2016 it claimed to have provided services to 2000 self-published authors. In 2018, they introduced a rapid publication service, which does not include editing.

== History ==
Notion Press was founded jointly by Naveen Valasakumar, Jana Pillay, and Bhargava Adepally in January 2012. In 2016, it received a funding of USD 1 million from HNIs.

=== Services ===
Authors can use online tools on the Notion Press website to design their books, and they can also pay for a range of services such as basic copyediting and marketing. The company's stated goal is to help self-published authors make money from their books; according to the company, the author is allowed to keep 70% of the profit of their sales.
