= Mahindwara =

Village in Bihar, India

- Village
- Location in Bihar, India Mahindwara (India)
- Coordinates: 26.3352°N 85.4075°E
- Country: India
- State: Bihar
- District: Sitamarhi

Population (2011)
  - Total: 3,677
- Time zone: UTC+5:30 (IST)

Mahindwara is a village and a gram panchayat located in the Runisaidpur subdivision of the Sitamarhi District in Bihar, India. The nearest town is Sitamarhi.

== Geography ==
Mahindwara is located at 26.3352°N 85.4075°E.

== Demographics ==
As of the 2011 India census, Mahindwara had a population of 3,677. Males constitute 1,930 and females 1,747. Mahindwara has an average literacy rate of 65.25%.: male literacy is 77.12%%, and female literacy is 51.73%.
