= Lalit Mehta =

Indian social activist

- Died: 14 May 2008
- Cause of death: murder

Lalit Mehta (1972–14 May 2008) was an Indian social activist.

== Social activist ==
Mehta, a 36-year-old engineer-turned-social-activist, was involved in activities that sought to advance rural employment, basic health facilities, right to food, and child rights. His organisational involvement was essentially with foundations that had a Gandhian orientation and outlook. Mehta was a full-time activist of the Right to Food Campaign and the Gram Swaraj Abhiyan; he was also the secretary of the Vikas Sahyog Kendra (VSK), a non-governmental organisation based in Palamau.

== Death ==
Mehta was murdered in 2008. After his murder, the Naxals belonging to the Communist Party of India (Maoist) distributed a leaflet claiming that they knew Mehta's killers and they would be brought to justice, saying that they would make crimes such as murder be punishable by death. In January 2009 Chennai Police recovered the body of Raju Singh, who was the prime suspect in the crime, claiming that he was killed by naxals.

== Personal life ==
Mehta was survived by his wife and two sons.

== See also ==
- Right to Information Act, 2005
- Attacks on RTI activists in India
