= Sunil Kapoor =

Indian RTI activist

- Kapoor in 2025
- Born: 1989 (age 36–37); Jind, Haryana, India
- Died: 14 September 2025 September 14, 2025 (aged 35–36); Dehradun, Uttarakhand, India
- Cause of death: Gunshot
- Occupations: Jeweller and social activist

Sunil Kapoor (c. 1989 – 14 September 2025) was an Indian jeweller and Right to Information (RTI) activist from Jind, Haryana. Known for exposing police corruption through RTI queries, complaints, and sting operations shared on social media, he faced multiple assaults and threats. In 2025, Kapoor was accused in a case involving sexual harassment allegations against a senior police officer. He died by suicide after allegedly shooting at police and being surrounded during a raid.

== Early life ==
Kapoor was born around 1989 in Jind, Haryana. He worked as a jeweller while pursuing activism.

== Activism ==
Kapoor began his RTI activism around 2018, focusing on police misconduct in Haryana. He filed numerous RTI queries and complaints, leading to actions against several police personnel.

He regularly posted sting videos on Facebook exposing bribery and other systemic issues. His work earned him support from fellow activists but also reprisals.

A relative of Kapoor revealed that he began his activism against corruption in India around 2015, utilising social media platforms and the internet. He operated over 150 social media accounts during this period.

== 2018 attacks and threats ==
In February 2018, Kapoor received death threats via phone. On 26 March 2018, masked assailants attacked his home, injuring him and his family, including his mother, with gunfire and lathis; the incident was captured on CCTV. Less than two weeks later, on 5 April 2018, he was assaulted again at his jewellery shop by masked men with lathis, sustaining severe injuries requiring knee surgery.

Kapoor accused a DSP-rank officer of orchestrating the attacks in retaliation for a complaint about the officer accepting bribes, supported by a video.

He had requested police protection twice after the first attack but was ignored. Two suspects were arrested for the assaults. Fellow RTI activists demanded investigations into the DSP’s call records.

In August 2019, Kapoor faced another threat in Jind, prompting outcry from activists, though no arrests followed.

== 2025 accusations ==
In 2024–2025, Kapoor became implicated in a case after an anonymous letter accused former Jind Superintendent of Police Sumit Kumar of sexual harassment and exploitation of women police personnel.

The letter went viral, leading to a case against Kapoor under the IT Act and other sections for allegedly levelling the allegations. The Haryana government gave Kumar a clean chit and closed the matter, but the Women's Commission demanded further investigation.

== Death ==
On 13 September 2025, Kapoor allegedly shot at Sub-Inspector Surendra of the Jind CIA team near Haridwar bus stand before fleeing. The next day, on 14 September 2025, police located him hiding at a relative’s house in Laxman Chowk, Dehradun.

A joint team from Haryana, Haridwar, and Dehradun police surrounded the location. Kapoor locked himself in a room and, upon the door being opened with relatives' help, reportedly panicked and shot himself with his licensed revolver.

Police described it as suicide, but the death has been termed controversial and suspicious by some sources, with questions raised about the circumstances. Uttarakhand Police handled the proceedings.
