= Subodh Mitra =

Indian obstetrician and gynecologist

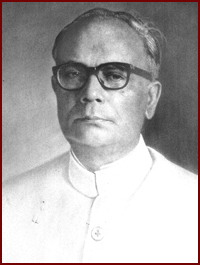
- Born: 1 November 1896; Jessore, Bengal Presidency, British India
- Died: 5 September 1961 (aged 64); Vienna, Austria
- Citizenship: India
- Education: University of Calcutta; Berlin University
- Known for: Mitra operation
- Scientific career
- Fields: Obstetrics and Gynecology
- Workplaces: University of Calcutta; R. G. Kar Medical College and Hospital which was then known as Carmichael Medical College

Subodh Mitra M.D., F.R.C.S., F.R.C.O.G. (1896–1961) was an Indian obstretrician and gynecologist. He is the founder of the "Mitra operation" for cervical cancer.

== Brief biography ==
He was born on 1 November 1896 in Jessore (presently in Bangladesh). He graduated from the University of Calcutta in 1922. He saw the plight of female patients as an undergraduate and took up the Obstetrics and Gynecology as his career. He has gone to Germany and completed post graduation in Obstetrics and Gynecology in 2 years. He got M.D. from Berlin University in 1924. He went to Edinburgh and did his Fellowship of the Royal College of Surgeons (F.R.C.S.) in 1925 and F.R.C.O.G. in 1928.

He returned to India and started working in R. G. Kar Medical College and Hospital in Calcutta as Resident Surgeon and Assistant Superintendent. He became the director of Chittaranjan Seva Sadan and Principal of its College of Obstetrics, Gynecology and Child Health, Calcutta. He was appointed as Dean of the faculty of Medicine and member of the Senate of the Academic council of the University of Calcutta. He became the Professor of Obstetrics and Gynecology and Director at R. G. Kar Medical College and Hospital, Calcutta. He was later appointed as Vice-chancellor of the University of Calcutta in 1960.

He was awarded Honoris causa of the Obstetrics and Gynecology Society of Germany and Italy for his scientific contribution in the field of Obstetrics and Gynecology.

He built Chittaranjan Cancer Hospital in 1950 with handsome donation to Deshbandhu Memorial Trust in Calcutta. Nobel laureate Madam Curie inaugurated this hospital.

He died on 5 September 1961 in Vienna while attending the 3rd International Congress of Obstetrics and Gynecology.

== Mitra operation ==
Dr. Mitra developed a technique in the surgery of Cervical cancer. His technique was well appreciated world over. The technique developed by Dr. S. Mitra for Cancer Cervix Operation namely Extended Radical Vaginal Hysterectomy with Extraperitoneal Lymphadenectomy was officially announced in British, American and German gynecological conferences. He demonstrated this technique in Vienna in 1952. This has been published in a monograph "Mitra Operation for Cancer of the Cervix" simultaneously by Charles C. Thomas, U.S.A. and Ryerson Press, Toronto and Blackwell Scientific Publications, Oxford.
