= Rinkoo Singh Rahee =

Whistleblower

- Born: 20 May 1982 (age 44); Uttar Pradesh, India
- Education: BTech degree in Metallurgy at NIT, Jamshedpur in 2002.
- Occupation: IAS officer
- Years active: 2023–present
- Organization: Indian Administrative Service
- Known for: Rti activist & Whistleblower

Rinkoo Singh Rahee (born 20 May 1982) is an Indian whistleblower and 2023 batch IAS officer of UP cadre who has earlier worked as a District Social Welfare Officer and fought against corruption in sponsored welfare schemes in Uttar Pradesh (UP). He was shot six times by local gangsters, damaging his jaw and the vision of one eye, for exposing corruption.

His first posting as IAS officer was Assistant Magistrate of Mathura from April 2024 to July 2025. Presently he is posted in Board of Revenue, Lucknow since July 2025.

== Background ==
Rinkoo Singh Rahee has been fighting corruption in his own department and state-run schemes since 2009. He was denied access to information on his own department. Instead, an attempt on his life was made allegedly at the behest of Principal Secretary Navtej Singh, and other department officials during the Mayawati government. He started a hunger strike in Lucknow hoping the Akhilesh Yadav government would pay heed to his demands for a reply on his pending RTI application; a criminal investigation into the corruptions charges; and act against miscreants but instead was admitted to a psychiatric ward.

== Life and early career ==
He was born in Aligarh to a lower middle-class family on 20 May 1982. He did his elementary schooling in Aligarh and completed his BTech degree in Metallurgy at NIT, Jamshedpur in 2002. In the same year, he scored All India 17th rank in GATE that assured him a seat in his desired stream at any top technological institute. He opted for a civil service career instead. In pursuit of his objective, he undertook various civil services examinations/interviews. He passed the Uttar Pradesh Upper Subordinate Services examination in 2004, and was selected on the post of District social welfare officer and was posted at Muzaffarnagar in 2008.

He showed interest in social development from his early years and took initiative in establishing a "Library" and "Adult education center" at Aligarh. He was then posted as a coordinater at the state-run coaching institute for IAS and IPS aspirants from the Dalit community at Aligarh.

He continued to prepare for the civil services examination and cleared the UPSC Civil Services Examination in the year 2022 and was allotted the Indian Administrative Service in the Uttar Pradesh cadre.

== Muzaffarnagar welfare fund corruption scandal ==
The social welfare department at Muzaffarnagar distributed over ₹40 crore (US$8.26 million) annually to beneficiaries under various state-run welfare schemes. Rahi ordered an inquiry into the allocation of funds over the last five years, soon after he arrived. He found serious discrepancies:

- Out of the allocated funds to be distributed as part of Old-age pension scheme, money was taken for 62,447 people but only 47,707 beneficiaries received it. Each beneficiary is entitled to 3,600 rupees annually.
- There were no records for ₹5.5 crore (US$1.14 million) distributed to 22,000 OBC students and ₹11 crore (US$2.27 million) distributed to all BPLF families and General category – other than OBC, SC, ST, and Minorities.

Rahee complained to his seniors and also informed Bhuvneesh Kumar, a District Magistrate of Muzaffaranagar, about the irregularities. Kumar said that a few days before the attack Rahee had told him of the irregularities, and had planned to computerise a record of what he had discovered, but before he could do that, he was attacked.

=== RTI request ===
Rinkoo Singh filed a Right to Information (RTI) application on 28 November 2007, but never received a reply within the mandatory period of 30 days. He followed up by filing a complaint at Central Information Commission (CIC) under section 18 of the commission. CIC issued a notice to Public Information Officer (PIO) for explanation and demanded he supply the information within the mandated time. PIO replied to CIC on 2 February 2009. CIC then directed PIO to provide the information on two of five queries. CIC rejected the remaining three queries, claiming they did not fall within the definition of "Information" as defined in the RTI Act.

=== Armed attack ===
After Rahee's complaints, armed miscreants shot him six time when he was playing badminton on the morning of 26 March 2009. His jaw was severely damaged and he lost the vision of one eye, but survived.

Police found that the attack was carried out by local gangsters at the behest of welfare department officials. Police arrested nine people, including Mukesh Chaudhary, a Samajwadi Party (SP) leader, and Ashok Kashyap, an assistant accountant at the welfare department. According to police, Mukesh Chaudhary was annoyed that Rahi did not sanction scholarships for some students and Ashok Kashyap was annoyed as Rahi had ordered a departmental inquiry into the alleged corruption.

Kumar issued an order to attach the property of Chaudary, who had been enriched by ₹7 crore (US$1.45 million) over five years.

=== Inquiry committee ===
After Rahee was attacked, an inquiry committee was set up under Alka Tandon, director of the social welfare department – Meerut. The committee found no records of funds spent in the last five years by the Social welfare, corroborating Rahi's allegations. The committee also found embezzlement to the tune of ₹10 crore (US$2.07 million), associated with various welfare schemes in 2009, according to Narendra Kumar Chowdhary, Social welfare department director. The Committee submitted the report with findings that included:

- No records were found regarding the scholarships at 101 schools.
- No records were found about five years of verification of people who are getting benefits on name of Elderly[Old-age] schemes and Widow pension schemes.
- Money was distributed to families having no daughter as part of the Daughter's marriage scheme.

The report also hinted that the local officials of the education department's involvement in the malpractices of Scholarship scheme. The inquiry team found accounting discrepancies to the tune of crores of rupees in almost all the schemes.

=== Discovery of further corruption ===
Rahee said that he had information that of around ₹60 crore (US$12.4 million) to ₹70 crore (US$14.46 million) that were allocated to Muzaffarnagar's Social welfare department in 2008–09, a large amount was unused. He believed that the reply to the RTI application would expose another scam in the department. Rahee said that he sought to discover where the unused funds went, and filed an application under the Right to Information Act, 2005 to discover who beneficiaries were, but did not receive the full details, and had therefore filed an appeal.

Rahee also said that he had compromised by limiting his request to one year, having been told that details for other years were not available.

=== Hunger strike and attempted hospitalisation ===
Speaking at a one-day token fast launched at Jantar Mantar on 25 March 2012 by anti-corruption activist Anna Hazare, Rahi announced that he too would undertake a hunger strike starring 26 March 2012 at Lucknow, in part because his RTI request had been rejected.

Lucknow police, intending to disrupt the protest after midnight, first brought in doctors to check his condition and forcibly evicted him from the protest site. They tried to get him admitted first to a local hospital and then to a psychiatric ward of Chhatrapati Shahuji Maharaj Medical University (CSMMU), but the hospital refused to admit him after neither Rahi nor his family provided consent.

On 28 March 2012, the Government of Uttar Pradesh formed a two-member committee, chaired by the Meerut commissioner, to probe Rahee's allegations. Awadesh Pradesh, the social welfare minister, said that the committee was expected to submit their findings in two months.

=== Retaliation ===
Facing criticism and media coverage, he was transferred to his hometown, Aligarh. Anti-corruption activist Arvind Kejriwal, criticised the government crackdown on Rahi, saying that Rahi "raised a genuine voice against corruption", accused the ruling party of direct involvement in "corruption, murder and assault", and criticised them for failing to provide protection to Rahi.

Rahee continued to protest in Aligarh. He was given an insignificant position – as a coordinator at the Dr. B.R.Ambedkar IAS PCS Coaching Centre. He said that senior officials of the police department had refused to co-operate with him after he provided them with details of the scam, and that RTI requests had not been honoured.

== Tenure as IAS Officer ==
Rinkoo SIngh Rahi cleared the UPSC in 2021 and joined the IAS in 2022. He was posted as the Sub-Divisional Magistrate in Shahjahanpur. During his tenure here, he punished a law clerk for urinating in public by forcing him to do sit-ups. The incident triggered protests against him by lawyers who cited the lack of public toilets and blamed the laxity of the administration, which forced them to rely on public urination. Rinkoo Singh took responsibility for the situation, and in a moment that went viral, performed sit-ups in front of the lawyers protest, earning him their respect. However, he was transferred 36 hours later to the UP Revenue Board.

In March 2026, Rinkoo SIngh tendered a 'technical resignation', alleging denial of posting. He stated that he was being sidelined and prevented from conducting any meaningful work. His resignation led to an uproar in the Indian administration that began searching his records for irregularities, but found none. Finally, Anil Kumar, Chairman of the Revenue Council, assured Rinkoo that they would respect his concerns and provide him with a useful post. Following this declaration he withdrew his resignation. During the controversy, Rinkoo Singh alleged a parallel system of corruption that exists within the bureaucracy and protected by the IAS association.

== Notes ==
- See also, Attacks on RTI activists in India.
