= Babasaheb Bhimrao Ambedkar Bihar University =

Public university in Muzaffarpur, Bihar, India

- Official seal of B.R.A.B.U
- Motto: नास्ति विद्यासमं चक्षुः
- Motto in English: Knowledge is the greatest eye
- Type: Public
- Established: 1960 (66 years ago)
- Affiliations: UGC
- Chancellor: Governor of Bihar
- Vice-Chancellor: Dinesh Chandra Rai
- Location: Muzaffarpur, Bihar, India; 26.1131°N 85.3750°E
- Campus: Urban
- Website: brabu.ac.in www.brabu.net
- Location of BRABU in India

Babasaheb Bhimrao Ambedkar Bihar University, (abbreviated as BRABU) also known as B.R. Ambedkar Bihar University, is a state university located in Muzaffarpur. Established in 1960, the university has 37 constituent colleges and offers a range of undergraduate, postgraduate, and research programs.

The university is recognized by the University Grants Commission (UGC) and is a member of the Association of Indian Universities (AIU). It provides affiliation to several colleges and institutes across the state, promoting higher education.

The university offers various full-time and part-time courses, including distance education programs. It also organizes symposia, seminars, and workshops to facilitate academic growth and development.

As a UGC-recognized institution, the university has been receiving assistance for computerization and internet connectivity since 1987. This has enabled the university to establish a strong infrastructure for teaching, learning, and research.

== History ==
Bihar University was established on 2 January 1952 after being separated from Patna University, with its headquarters at Patna.

In 1960, under the Bihar State Universities Act, 1960, the existing Bihar University was bifurcated into three separate universities:

- Bihar University, Muzaffarpur
- Ranchi University, Ranchi
- Bhagalpur University, Bhagalpur

In 1961, the Bihar University Act, 1961 further bifurcated Bihar University, Muzaffarpur into:

- Bihar University, Muzaffarpur
- Magadh University, Bodh Gaya

In 1973, Bihar University, Muzaffarpur was again bifurcated to create:

- Bihar University, Muzaffarpur
- Mithila University, Darbhanga

In 1990, the university was bifurcated once more, resulting in:

- Bihar University, Muzaffarpur
- Jai Prakash University, Chhapra

In 1992, the name of Bihar University was changed to Babasaheb Bhimrao Ambedkar Bihar University (BRABU), Muzaffarpur, and it has been known by this name since then.

== Colleges ==
List of Collegss Under Bihar University

=== Constituent Colleges ===
Name of College	Location
L.S. College	Muzaffarpur
M.D.D.M College	Muzaffarpur
R.D.S. College	Muzaffarpur
Dr. R.M.L.S. College	Muzaffarpur
M.P. Sinha Science College	Muzaffarpur
R.B.B.M. College	Muzaffarpur
Nitishwar Singh College	Muzaffarpur
Rameshwar Singh College	Muzaffarpur
L.N.T. College	Muzaffarpur
M.S.K.B. College	Muzaffarpur
Jiwachh College	Motipur, Muzaffarpur
R.C. College	Sakra, Muzaffarpur
S.R.P.S. College	Jaintpur, Muzaffarpur
R. N. College	Hajipur, Vaishali
Vaishali Mahila College	Hajipur, Vaishali
Jamunilal College	Hajipur, Vaishali
D.C. College	Hajipur, Vaishali
L.N. College	Bhagwanpur, Vaishali
Samta College	Jandaha, Vaishali
B.M.D. College	Dayalpur, Vaishali
S.R.K.G. College	Sitamarhi
S.L.K. College	Sitamarhi
R.S.S. Science College	Sitamarhi
R.S.S. Mahila College	Sitamarhi
J.S. College	Chandauli, Sitamarhi
M.S. College	Motihari, East Champaran
Dr. S.K. Sinha Women's College	Motihari, East Champaran
S.N.S. College	Motihari, East Champaran
L.N.D. College	Motihari, East Champaran
M.S.S.G. College	Areraj, East Champaran
S.R.A.P. College	Bara Chakiya, East Champaran
K.C.T.C. College	Raxaul, East Champaran
M.J.K. College	Bettiah, West Champaran
R.L.S.Y. College	Bettiah, West Champaran
T.P. Verma College	Narkatiyaganj, West Champaran
C.N. College	Sahebganj, Muzaffarpur
J.B.S.D. College	Bakuchi
R.P.S. College	Chakeyaj, Vaishali

=== Affiliated Colleges ===
Name of College	Location
Dr. J.M. College	Muzaffarpur
S.N.S. College	Muzaffarpur
R.B.T.S.H. Medical College	Muzaffarpur
L.N. Mishra College of Business Management	Muzaffarpur
S.K.J. Law College	Muzaffarpur
Vaishali Institute of Business and Rural Management	Muzaffarpur
M.H. Medical College	Muzaffarpur
Islamia Degree College	Muzaffarpur
Govt. Ayurvedic Medical College	Patna
Govt. Tibbi Medical College	Patna
Govt. S.K. Ayurved Medical College	Begusarai
Govt. S.Y.N.A. Ayurvedic Medical College	Bhagalpur
Govt. S.D. Ayurvedic Medical College	Buxar
Gaya Homeopathic Medical College	Gaya
Pt. J.K.J. College	Bagahi, Dholi, Samastipur
JLNM College	Nawahi, Sursand, Sitamarhi
GMHP College	Bagha, West Champaran
MNM Women's College	Bettiah, West Champaran
Nitiswar Ayurvedic College	Muzaffarpur
NHM College	Bihar Sharif
ZH Unani Medical College	Siwan
N Unani College	Bodh Gaya, Gaya
G.D. Memorial Homeopathic Medical College & Hospital	Patna
Dr. P.B.S. Gaya Homeopathic Medical College & Hospital	Bodh Gaya, Gaya
Dr. Yadubir Sinha Homeopathic Medical College & Hospital	Laheriasarai, Darbhanga
R.B.T.S. Govt. Homeopathic Medical College & Hospital	Muzaffarpur
Muzaffarpur Homeopathic Medical College & Hospital	Muzaffarpur
Kent Homeopathic Medical College & Hospital	Hajipur, Vaishali
Patna Homeopathic Medical College & Hospital	Patna
Bhola Paswan Shastri INTER AND DEGREE College Babhangama Bihariganj,	Madhepura
Mangla Kamla Homeopathic Medical College & Hospital	Siwan
Magadh Homeopathic Medical College & Hospital	Bihar Sharif, Nalanda
Maharshi Mehi Homeopathic Medical College & Hospital	Katihar
B.N.M. Homeopathic Medical College & Hospital	Saharsa
The Temple of Hahnemann Homeopathic Medical College & Hospital	Munger
K.N. Homeopathic Medical College & Hospital	Bhagalpur
Rameshwar Das Kedia Homeopathic Medical College & Hospital	Motihari, East Champaran
Dr. Halim Homeopathic Medical College & Hospital	Darbhanga
Shri Moti Singh Jageshwari Ayurvedic College & Hospital	Chhapra

=== Management Colleges ===
Name of College	Location
L.N. Mishra College of Business Management	Muzaffarpur
Vaishali Institute of Business and Rural Management	Muzaffarpur

=== Homeopathic Colleges ===
Name of College	Location
B. N. M. Homeopathic Medical College & Hospital	Saharsa
Dr. Halim Homeopathic Medical College & Hospital	Darbhanga
Dr. P. B. S. Gaya Homeopathic Medical College & Hospital	Bodhgaya, Gaya
Dr. Yadubir Sinha Homeopathic Medical College & Hospital	Laheriasarai, Darbhanga
G. D. Memorial Homeopathic Medical College & Hospital	Patna
Gaya Homeopathic Medical College	Gaya
K. N. Homeopathic Medical College & Hospital	Bhagalpur
Kent Homeopathic Medical College & Hospital	Hajipur, Vaishali
Magadh Homeopathic Medical College & Hospital	Bihar Sharif, Nalanda
Maharshi Mehi Homeopathic Medical College & Hospital	Katihar
Mangla Kamla Homeopathic Medical College & Hospital	Siwan
Muzaffarpur Homeopathic Medical College & Hospital	Muzaffarpur
Patna Homeopathic Medical College & Hospital	Patna
R. B. T. S. Govt. Homeopathic Medical College & Hospital	Muzaffarpur
Rameshwar Das Kedia Homeopathic Medical College & Hospital	Motihari, East Champaran
The Temple of Hahnemann Homeopathic Medical College & Hospital	Munger

=== Ayurvedic Colleges ===
Name of College	Location
Govt. S.D. Ayurvedic Medical College	Buxar
Govt. S.K. Ayurved Medical College	Begusarai
Govt. S.Y.N.A. Ayurvedic Medical College	Bhagalpur
Govt. Ayurvedic Medical College	Patna
Govt. Tibbi Medical College	Patna
Nitiswar Ayurvedic College	Muzaffarpur
Shri Moti Singh Jageshwari Ayurvedic College & Hospital	Chhapra

=== Unani Colleges ===
Name of College	Location
N Unani College	Bodhgaya, Gaya
ZH Unani Medical College	Siwan

=== Law College ===
Name of College	Location
S.K.J. Law College	Muzaffarpur

== Notable alumni ==
- Bandana Kumari
- Ajit Anjum
- Sanjeev K Jha
- Mridula Sinha
- Renu Devi
- Radha Mohan Singh, MP
- Arjun Roy
- Rama Devi
- Ritu Jaiswal
- Ajay Nishad
- Rama Kishore Singh
- Upendra Kushwaha, Ex Union Minister
- Shiv Chandra Ram, Ex Minister, Bihar
- Sanjay Kumar Singh, Minister, Bihar
- Umadhar Singh
- Ravindra Prabhat
- Nayab Singh
- Renu C. Laskar
- Abdul Hakeem Azhari
- Shamim Ahmad
- Nutan Thakur- Lucknow based social and political activist
