= Ratauli (India) =

- Village & Gram Panchayat
- Ratouli
- Location within Bihar
- Coordinates: 26.188°N 86.702°E
- Country: India
- State: Bihar
- District: Supaul
- Region: Mithila
- Local Government: Gram Panchayat
- Villages: Ratauli, Jarauli, Bairiya, Jharka
- Pin Code: 852138

Ratauli is a village in Supaul district of the Indian state of Bihar, located 20 km east of Supaul and 204 km from Patna.
