= Shashidhar Mishra =

Indian activist (1975–2010)

Shashidhar Mishra (1975–2010) was an Indian Right to Information Act (RTI) activist who was shot dead by unknown assailants near his house in Phulwaria Village, located near the Begusarai town of Bihar, on the night on 14 February 2010.

By profession, he was street vendor who sold pens, sweets and snacks in Barauni market. He lived in a mud house in his village and used a bicycle for transport. He is survived by a wife and four children.

He earned the nickname of "Khabri Lal" (the news man) and worked tirelessly to expose corruption at panchayat and block levels. He filed his first RTI application in 2008 and by the time he died he had filed more than 1,000 RTI applications, mostly concerning issues troubling his village.

The National RTI Forum has honoured him by naming an award after him, the Shashidhar Mishra RTI Gallantry award
