= 1962 in India =

- Centuries: 18th; 19th; 20th; 21st
- Decades: 1940s; 1950s; 1960s; 1970s; 1980s
- See also: List of years in India; Timeline of Indian history

The following lists events that happened during 1962 in the Republic of India.

== Incumbents ==
- President of India – Rajendra Prasad until 13 May, Sarvepalli Radhakrishnan
- Prime Minister of India – Jawaharlal Nehru
- Vice President of India – Sarvepalli Radhakrishnan until 13 May; Zakir Husain
- Chief Justice of India – Bhuvaneshwar Prasad Sinha

=== Governors ===
- Andhra Pradesh – Bhim Sen Sachar (until 8 September), Satyawant Mallannah Shrinagesh (starting 8 September)
- Assam – Satyavant Mallannah Shrinagesh (until 7 September), Vishnu Sahay (starting 7 September)
- Bihar – Zakir Hussain (until 11 May), M. A. S. Ayyangar (starting 11 May)
- Gujarat – Mehdi Nawaz Jung
- Jammu and Kashmir – Karan Singh
- Mysore – Jayachamarajendra Wadiyar
- Kerala – V. V. Giri
- Madhya Pradesh – Hari Vinayak Pataskar
- Maharashtra –
  - until 16 April: Sri Prakasa
  - 16 April-6 October: P. Subbarayan
  - starting 28 November: Vijaya Lakshmi Pandit
- Odisha – Yeshwant Narayan Sukthankar (until 15 September), Ajudhia Nath Khosla (starting 15 September)
- Punjab – Narahar Vishnu Gadgil (until 1 October), Pattom A. Thanu Pillai (starting 1 October)
- Rajasthan – Gurumukh Nihal Singh (until 16 April), Sampurnanand (starting 16 April)
- Uttar Pradesh – Burgula Ramakrishna Rao (until 15 April), Bishwanath Das (starting 15 April)
- West Bengal – Padmaja Naidu

== Events ==
- National income - ₹200,769 million
- 10 February - Indian National Committee for Space Research set up with Vikram Sarabhai from Physical Research Laboratory leading it.
- 3 April – Jawaharlal Nehru is elected de facto Prime Minister of India.
- 6 May – India defeats the Philippines in the Eastern Zone final of 1962 Davis Cup at New Delhi
- 28 July – A locust swarm threatens New Delhi.
- 21 September – A border conflict between China and India erupts into fighting.
- 10 October – Beginning of the Sino-Indian War, a border dispute involving two of the world's largest nations (between India and the People's Republic of China).
- 20 October – Chinese troops invade Kashmir and illegally captured Aksai Chin thereby starting the Sino-Indian War.
- 26 October - Emergency enforced in India for the first time following the Sino-Indian War.
- 21 November –
  - The 1962 war ends with a Chinese Victory and India surrenders Aksai Chin to China.
  - China withdraws troops from Arunachal Pradesh and orders ceasefire along the McMahon Line.
- 19 December – The last foreign-occupied territory of India, Daman and Diu, is integrated into India.
- Internment of Chinese-Indians at Deoli, Rajasthan

== Law ==
- 28 October – Defence of India act and Defence of India rules, 1962 promulgated as ordinance.
- The twelfth and Thirteenth Amendment of The Constitution of India

== Births ==
- 1 January – Ravi Raghavendra, actor.
- 17 January – Karan Kapoor, actor, model and photographer.
- 12 February – Jagapathi Babu, actor.
- 12 February – Kanal Kannan, actor, action choreographer and screenwriter.
- 17 March – Kalpana Chawla, Indian-American Astronaut and First Indian women to go to space. (died 2003).
- 31 March – Ramki, actor.
- 3 April – Jaya Prada, actress and politician.
- 7 April – Ram Gopal Varma, film director, writer and producer.
- 13 May – Acharya Shri Mahashraman, 11th Acharya of Jain Terapanth Sect
- 27 May – Ravi Shastri, cricketer.
- 5 June – C. Sylendra Babu, Indian Police Service Officer.
- 14 June – Jayaprakash, actor and producer
- 9 June – N. K. Senthamarai Kannan, Indian Police Service Officer.
- 3 July – U. Sagayam, former career Indian civil servant
- 6 July – Thota Narasimham, Indian politician and member of parliament from Kakinada.
- 12 July – Shiva Rajkumar, actor and producer.
- 4 August – Thalaivasal Vijay, actor and dubbing artist
- 10 August – Atiq Ahmed, gangster and politician. (d. 2023)
- 15 August – Arjun Sarja, actor, producer and director.
- 25 August – Rajiv Kapoor, actor, producer and director. (d. 2021)
- 4 September – Kiran More, cricketer.
- 16 November – Ambika, actress.

=== Full date unknown ===
- Sucheta Dalal, finance journalist.
- Madhavi, actress.

== Deaths ==
- 11 June – Chhabi Biswas, actor (b. 1900).
- 1 July – Bidhan Chandra Roy, second Chief Minister of West Bengal (b. 1882).
- 4 December – Annapurnanand, Hindi writer (B 21 Sep. 1895)

=== Full date unknown ===
- K. C. Dey, actor (b. 1893).

== See also ==
- List of Bollywood films of 1962
