= 1961 in India =

- Centuries: 18th; 19th; 20th; 21st
- Decades: 1940s; 1950s; 1960s; 1970s; 1980s
- See also: List of years in India; Timeline of Indian history

Events in the year 1961 in the Republic of India.

== Incumbents ==
- President of India – Rajendra Prasad
- Prime Minister of India – Jawaharlal Nehru
- Vice President of India – Sarvepalli Radhakrishnan
- Chief Justice of India – Bhuvaneshwar Prasad Sinha

=== Governors ===
- Andhra Pradesh – Bhim Sen Sachar
- Assam – Vishnu Sahay (until 13 January), Satyavant Mallannah Shrinagesh (starting 13 January)
- Bihar – Zakir Hussain
- Gujarat – Mehdi Nawaz Jung
- Jammu and Kashmir – Karan Singh
- Mysore – Jayachamarajendra Wadiyar
- Kerala – V. V. Giri
- Madhya Pradesh – Hari Vinayak Pataskar
- Maharashtra – Sri Prakasa
- Orissa – Yeshwant Narayan Sukthankar
- Punjab – Narahar Vishnu Gadgil
- Rajasthan – Gurumukh Nihal Singh
- Uttar Pradesh – Burgula Ramakrishna Rao
- West Bengal – Padmaja Naidu

== Events ==
- National income - ₹186,821 million
- 20 January – Queen Elizabeth II start of Royal visit.
- 5 February - Cachar Gana Sangram Parishad formed against imposition of Assamese language in Barak Valley by Bimala Prasad Chaliha government.
- 4 March – the first Aircraft carrier of Indian Navy, INS Vikrant was commissioned.
- 19 April - Indian Foreign Service officer K. Sankara Pillai assassinated at Indian High Commission, Ottawa by a youth of Yugoslavian origins. This is the first martyr-ship of an Indian Diplomat.
- 19 May - Eleven Bengali Language Movement workers of Barak Valley including Kamala Bhattacharya killed in Assam Rifles firings at Silchar.
- 29 May – Nearly 32 people died in a coastal village in Kollam, Kerala due to chelonitoxism after consuming Turtle meat.
- 23 June - Sainik School system was established by Defence Minister of India, V. K. Krishna Menon.
- 12 July – Panshet Dam bursts in Pune causing a massive flood in the city of Pune. Over 1,000 people die.
- 2 October - Shipping Corporation of India is incorporated by amalgamation of Eastern Shipping Corporation and Western Shipping Corporation.
- 14 October - Jawaharlal Nehru commissions the first Electric locomotive that is made in India at Chittaranjan Locomotive Works.
- 1 November – The Hungry generation movement is launched in Calcutta.
- 17-19 December – Goa is officially ceded to India after 400 years of Portuguese rule.

== Law ==
- 5 December – Supreme Court of India held that land taking under Kerala Agrarian Relations Act, 1961 is not protected from judicial scrutiny of Article 31(A).
- The Tenth and Eleventh Amendments of the Constitution of India (1961)
- Anti-dowry Act

== Births ==
- 7 January – Supriya Pathak, actress.
- 22 February - Mansoor Ali Khan, actor, music composer, writer and producer.
- 12 June – Jagadish, actor.
- 6 July – Vandana Chavan, politician and lawyer.
- 19 July – Harsha Bhogle, cricket commentator and journalist
- 15 August – Suhasini Maniratnam, actress, producer and director.
- 19 November – Vivek, actor and comedian. (d. 2021).

=== Full date unknown ===
- V. M. Girija, poet.

== See also ==
- List of Bollywood films of 1961
