= 1960 in India =

- Centuries: 18th; 19th; 20th; 21st
- Decades: 1940s; 1950s; 1960s; 1970s; 1980s
- See also: List of years in India; Timeline of Indian history

Events in the year 1960 in the Republic of India. (post Independence period)

== Incumbents ==
- President of India – Rajendra Prasad
- Prime Minister of India – Jawaharlal Nehru
- Vice President of India - Sarvepalli Radhakrishnan
- Chief Justice of India – Bhuvaneshwar Prasad Sinha

=== Governors ===
- Andhra Pradesh – Bhim Sen Sachar
- Assam – Saiyid Fazal Ali (until 12 November), Vishnu Sahay (starting 12 November)
- Bihar – Zakir Hussain
- Gujarat – Mehdi Nawaz Jung (starting 1 May)
- Jammu and Kashmir – Karan Singh
- Mysore – Jayachamarajendra Wadiyar
- Kerala – Burgula Ramakrishna Rao (until 1 July), V. V. Giri (starting 1 July)
- Madhya Pradesh – Hari Vinayak Pataskar
- Maharashtra – Sri Prakasa
- Odisha – Yeshwant Narayan Sukthankar
- Punjab – Narahar Vishnu Gadgil
- Rajasthan – Gurumukh Nihal Singh
- Uttar Pradesh – Varahgiri Venkat Giri (until 1 July), Kanhaiyalal Maneklal Munshi (starting 1 July)
- West Bengal – Padmaja Naidu

== Events ==
- National income - ₹176,333 million
- 11 March - Bombay High Court overturns Jury trial verdict on Nanavati case and declares him guilty.
- 1 May – In India, 1 May is declared as 'Maharashtra Divas', i.e., Maharashtra Day (the same day is also celebrated as 'Kaamgaar Divas', i.e., Workers Day) or 'Gujarat Diwas'.
- 1 May – Yashwantrao Chavan took oath as the 1st Chief Minister of Maharashtra
- 7 May – Border Road Organization (BRO) was established.
- 20 June – Maharashtra State Electricity Board formed.
- The ninth amendments of the Constitution of India
- Air India enters United States with flights to New York.
- Bajaj Auto goes public.
- Goa, Diu and Daman were freed from Portuguese rule and became parts of the Indian federation.

== Law ==
- 1 May – Gujarat State and Maharashtra State are formed from the State of Bombay as laid down by the States Reorganisation Act.

== Births ==
- 2 January – Raman Lamba, cricketer (died 1998)
- 5 February – Maganti Venkateswara Rao, politician and member of parliament from Eluru.
- 1 May – Y. V. Subba Reddy, politician from YSR Congress Party and former member of parliament from Ongole.
- 21 May – Mohanlal, actor.
- 10 June – Nandamuri Balakrishna, actor and politician.
- 25 June – Suresh Gopi, actor.
- 11 July – Kumar Gaurav, actor.
- 27 July – Poornima Bhagyaraj, actress.
- 27 July – P. Sai Kumar, actor, dubbing artist and television presenter.
- 12 September – Vadivelu, actor and comedian.
- 13 September – Karthik, actor.

== Deaths ==
- 30 January – J. C. Kumarappa, economist (born 1892).
- 2 February – Jagadguru Swami Sri Bharati Krishna Tirthaji Maharaja, Hindu teacher (born 1884).
- 20 April – Pannalal Ghosh, flute (bānsurī) player and composer (born 1911).
- 27 April – Rajshekhar Basu, writer, chemist and lexicographer (born 1880).
- 8 September - Feroze Gandhi, politician (age 48)

== See also ==
- Bollywood films of 1960
