= 1959 in India =

- Centuries: 18th; 19th; 20th; 21st
- Decades: 1930s; 1940s; 1950s; 1960s; 1970s
- See also: List of years in India; Timeline of Indian history

Events in the year 1959 in the Republic of India.

== Incumbents ==
- President of India – Rajendra Prasad
- Prime Minister of India – Jawaharlal Nehru
- Vice President of India – Sarvepalli Radhakrishnan
- Chief Justice of India – Sudhi Ranjan Das (until 30 Sep.), Bhuvaneshwar Prasad Sinha (starting 1 Oct.)

=== Governors ===
- Andhra Pradesh – Bhim Sen Sachar
- Assam –
  - until 22 August: Saiyid Fazal Ali
  - 23 August-14 October: Chandreswar Prasad Sinha
  - starting 14 October: Satyavant Mallannah Shrinagesh
- Bihar – Zakir Hussain
- Bombay – Sri Prakasa
- Jammu and Kashmir – Karan Singh
- Mysore – Jayachamarajendra Wadiyar
- Kerala – Burgula Ramakrishna Rao
- Madhya Pradesh – Hari Vinayak Pataskar
- Orissa – Yeshwant Narayan Sukthankar
- Punjab – Narahar Vishnu Gadgil
- Rajasthan – Gurumukh Nihal Singh
- Uttar Pradesh – Kanhaiyalal Maneklal Munshi
- West Bengal – Padmaja Naidu

== Events ==
- National income - ₹161,017 million
- January 9 - Indira Gandhi becomes president of Indian National Congress by succeeding U. N. Dhebar.
- February 4 - Bhilai Steel Plant inaugurated by President of India.
- March 31 - India grants political asylum to the Dalai Lama after he fled Tibet and crossed into Indian territory following 1959 Tibetan uprising.
- April 10 - An English Electric Canberra jet bomber of Indian Air Force that crossed into Pakistani Airspace was shot down near Rawalpindi by Pakistan Air Force's Sabre jets.
- April 27 - Indian Navy officer Nanavati shoots his wife's lover Ahuja and becomes the basis for Nanavati Case.
- May 1 - President of India Rajendra Prasad gave assent for Reserve Bank of India (Amendment) Act 1959 which created provision for introduction of External Rupee (Gulf Rupee and Hajj Rupee) for using as tender in Trucial States, Oman, Qatar etc. The move is meant to curb the misuse of Indian rupee by gold smugglers.
- July 31 - The EMS ministry, an elected communist government in Kerala brought down through President's rule following Vimochana Samaram.
- 1 August - Free market proponents C. Rajagopalachari and N. G. Ranga walks out of Indian National Congress and creates Swatantra Party protesting Congress's commitment towards Land reform and Cooperative farming.

=== Dates unknown ===
- Bajaj Auto obtains license from Government of India to manufacture two- and three-wheelers in India.

== Law ==
- Eighth Amendment of the Constitution of India

== Births ==
- 3 January – Ninong Ering, politician and member of parliament from Arunachal East.
- 6 January – Kapil Dev, cricketer.
- 15 May - Anandaraj, actor.
- 25 June – Suresh Krissna, film director.
- 22 July – Ajit Pawar, politician (d. 2026)
- 29 July – Sanjay Dutt, actor.
- 29 August
  - Suman, actor.
  - Nagarjuna, actor and film producer.
- 19 December – H. D. Kumaraswamy, politician and Chief Minister of Karnataka.

== Deaths ==
- 1 November – M. K. Thyagaraja Bhagavathar, actor and Carnatic singer (born 1909).
- 4 December – Ahmad Saeed Dehlavi, freedom fighter and first general secretary of the Jamiat Ulama-e-Hind. (born 1888)

== See also ==
- List of Bollywood films of 1959
