= 1964 in India =

- Centuries: 18th; 19th; 20th; 21st
- Decades: 1940s; 1950s; 1960s; 1970s; 1980s
- See also: List of years in India; Timeline of Indian history

Events in the year 1964 in the Republic of India.

1964 cyclone

== Incumbents ==
- President of India – Sarvepalli Radhakrishnan
- Prime Minister of India – Jawaharlal Nehru until 27 May, Gulzarilal Nanda until 9 June (acting Prime Minister), Lal Bahadur Shastri
- Vice President of India – Zakir Husain
- Chief Justice of India – Bhuvaneshwar Prasad Sinha until 31 January, P. B. Gajendragadkar

=== Governors ===
- Andhra Pradesh – Satyawant Mallannah Shrinagesh (until May 4), Pattom A. Thanu Pillai (starting May 4)
- Assam – Vishnu Sahay
- Bihar – M. A. S. Ayyangar
- Gujarat – Mehdi Nawaz Jung
- Karnataka – S. M. Shrinagesh
- Jammu and Kashmir – Karan Singh
- Kerala – V. V. Giri
- Madhya Pradesh – Hari Vinayak Pataskar
- Maharashtra – Vijaya Lakshmi Pandit (until 18 October), P V Cherian (starting 14 November)
- Nagaland – Vishnu Sahay
- Odisha – Ajudhia Nath Khosla
- Punjab – Pattom A. Thanu Pillai (until 4 May), Hafiz Mohammad Ibrahim (starting 4 May)
- Rajasthan – Sampurnanand
- Uttar Pradesh – Bishwanath Das
- West Bengal – Padmaja Naidu

== Events ==
- National income - ₹268,953 million
- January 4 - The lost relic recovered in connection with 1963 Hazratbal Shrine theft.
- April 8 - Jammu and Kashmir (state) withdrew the Kashmir Conspiracy Case from a special court.
- April 11 - Thirty two Council members walks out of Communist Party of India National Council resulting in the 1964 split in the Communist Party of India.
- May 27 – Prime Minister Jawaharlal Nehru dies after a five-month illness; he is succeeded by Lal Bahadur Shastri.
- July 1 - IDBI Bank was established through an Act of Parliament.
- August 29 - The far right Hindu outfit, Vishva Hindu Parishad was founded.
- October 30 - Sirima–Shastri Pact signed to grant citizenship to almost 9 lakhs Tamils based in Ceylon.

== Law ==
- The Seventeenth Amendment of the Constitution of India

== Arts and literature ==
- 2 September – Indian Hungry generation poets arrested on charges of conspiracy against the State and Obscenity in literature.
- National Film Archive of India established in Pune.

== Sport ==
- Charanjeet Singh (hockey player) is awarded the Padma Shri.

== Births ==
- 9 January – Arjun, actor.
- 20 January – Fareed Zakaria, journalist
- 16 February – Shrirang Barne, politician, Member of Parliament from Maval constituency
- 30 April – Abhishek Chatterjee, Bengali film and television actor.
- 19 May – Murali, actor. (died 2010).
- 1 June – Rashid Patel, cricketer (Indian pace bowler, Lamba incident).
- 22 October – Amit Shah, politician.
- 13 August – Harisree Ashokan, actor.
- 26 August – Ilavarasu, cinematographer and actor.
- 10 September – Ramesh Aravind, actor and director.
- 23 September – Ponvannan, actor and director.
- 29 October – Gyan Prakash Upadhyaya, Indian Administrative Service (IAS) officer.
- 14 November – Manoj Singh Mandavi, politician (died 2022).

=== Full date unknown ===
- Bem Le Hunte, author.

== Deaths ==
- 27 May – Jawaharlal Nehru, politician and 1st Prime Minister of India (b. 1889).
- 6 February – Rajkumari Amrit Kaur, freedom fighter, social activist and Health Minister (b. 1887).
- 10 October – Guru Dutt, film director, producer, and actor (b. 1925).

== See also ==
- Bollywood films of 1964
