= 1963 in India =

- Centuries: 18th; 19th; 20th; 21st
- Decades: 1940s; 1950s; 1960s; 1970s; 1980s
- See also: List of years in India; Timeline of Indian history

Events in the year 1963 in the Republic of India.

== Incumbents ==
- President of India – Sarvepalli Radhakrishnan
- Prime Minister of India – Jawaharlal Nehru
- Vice President of India – Zakir Husain
- Chief Justice of India – Bhuvaneshwar Prasad Sinha

=== Governors ===
- Andhra Pradesh – Satyawant Mallannah Shrinagesh
- Assam – Saiyid Fazal Ali
- Bihar – Vishnu Sahay
- Gujarat – Mehdi Nawaz Jung
- Jammu and Kashmir – Karan Singh
- Mysore – Jayachamarajendra Wadiyar (until 4 May), S. M. Shrinagesh (starting 4 May)
- Kerala – V. V. Giri
- Madhya Pradesh – Hari Vinayak Pataskar
- Maharashtra – Vijaya Lakshmi Pandit
- Nagaland – Vishnu Sahay (starting 1 December)
- Odisha – Ajudhia Nath Khosla
- Punjab – Pattom A. Thanu Pillai
- Rajasthan – Sampurnanand
- Uttar Pradesh – Bishwanath Das
- West Bengal – Padmaja Naidu

== Events ==
- National income - ₹230,580 million
- 21 November - India's first ever rocket launch was carried out at Thumba Equatorial Rocket Launching Station Thiruvananthapuram. The launch was successful and it sent NASA-made Nike-Apache rocket to space.
- 15 December - Kendriya Vidyalaya Sangathan established following recommendations of Second Pay Commission.
- 27 December - Theft of the Holy Relic from the Hazratbal Shrine

=== Dates unknown ===
- Indo Swizz project started at Kerala for developing new cattle breed.
- A group of scientist under leadership of G. N. Ramachandran develops Ramachandran plot.

== Law ==
- Supreme Court of India mandates that reservation should not exceed 50% for any institution.

== Births ==
- 23 March - George Maryan, actor and comedian.
- 29 April – Deepika Chikhalia, actress.
- 10 May – A. Raja, politician.
- 25 May – Gajendra Pal Singh Raghava, scientist.
- 2 June
  - Anand Abhyankar, Marathi actor. (d.2012)
  - Maganti Gopinath, politician (d. 2025)
- 16 June – Irai Anbu, Indian Administrative Service.
- 27 July – K. S. Chithra, playback singer.
- 30 July – Abhijith, actor.
- 10 August – Phoolan Devi, bandit turned politician, assassinated. (d.2001)
- 13 August – Sridevi, Actress. (d.2018)
- 17 August – S. Shankar, film director.
- 21 August – Radhika Sarathkumar, actress and producer.
- 27 August – Sumalatha, actress.
- 19 September – Bonda Mani, actor. (d. 2023)
- 20 October – Navjot Singh Sidhu, Indian opening batsman.
- 4 December – Jaaved Jaaferi, actor.
- 25 December – Raju Srivastav, comedian, actor and politician. (d.2022)

=== Full date unknown ===
- Keshava Malagi, writer.

== Deaths ==
- 28 February - Rajendra Prasad, First President of India (born 1884).
- 13 April – Babu Gulabrai, writer and historian (b. 1888).
- 30 October - U. Muthuramalingam Thevar, Indian Freedom Fighter, Orator, Politician (b. 1908).
- 24 November – Marotrao Kannamvar, Politician, 2nd Chief Minister of Maharashtra.
- 2 December – Sabu Dastagir, actor (b. 1924).

=== Full date unknown ===
- Amar Nath Kak, lawyer and author (b. 1889).

== See also ==
- Bollywood films of 1963
