= 1957 in India =

- Centuries: 18th; 19th; 20th; 21st
- Decades: 1930s; 1940s; 1950s; 1960s; 1970s
- See also: List of years in India; Timeline of Indian history

Events in the year 1957 in the Republic of India.

== Incumbents ==
- President of India – Dr. Rajendra Prasad
- Prime Minister of India – Pandit Jawaharlal Nehru
- Vice President of India – Sarvepalli Radhakrishnan
- Chief Justice of India – Sudhi Ranjan Das

=== Governors ===
- Andhra Pradesh – Chandulal Madhavlal Trivedi (until 1 August), Bhim Sen Sachar (starting 1 August)
- Assam – Saiyid Fazal Ali
- Bihar – R. R. Diwakar (until 5 July), Zakir Hussain (starting 5 July)
- Maharashtra – Sri Prakasa
- Jammu and Kashmir – Karan Singh
- Mysore – Jayachamarajendra Wadiyar
- Kerala – Burgula Ramakrishna Rao
- Madhya Pradesh – Pattabhi Sitaramayya (until 13 June), Hari Vinayak Pataskar (starting 13 June)
- Orissa – Bhim Sen Sachar (until 31 July), Yeshwant Narayan Sukthankar (starting 31 July)
- Punjab – Chandeshwar Prasad Narayan Singh
- Rajasthan – Gurumukh Nihal Singh
- Uttar Pradesh – Kanhaiyalal Maneklal Munshi
- West Bengal – Padmaja Naidu

== Events ==
- National income - ₹137,104 million
- January 26 - Portuguese Indian troops open fire at TarakPardi in Bombay State for securing right of pass between enclaves of Dadra and Nagar Haveli.
- April 1 - Second Nehru ministry adopts Decimalisation of Indian rupee and discontinue the concept of anna coin system.
- April 5 – First elected government of Kerala. Communist Party of India won the elections and E. M. S. Namboodiripad became the first chief minister of united Kerala.
- August 25 - Indian Polo Team won the Polo World cup held at France.
- September 1 - Indian Air Force inducts its first jet bomber Canberra at Squadron 5, Agra.
- December 4 - Hindustan Shipyard delivers its first passenger cum cargo vessel M V Andaman.

=== Date not known ===
- V. S. Wakankar discovers Bhimbetka rock shelter cave paintings.
- Hirakud dam opened

== Law ==
- India passes a bill making Kashmir under its control as part of the Union.
- Copyright Act

== Sport ==
- Balbir Singh Sr. became the first hockey player to be awarded the Padma Shri.

== Births ==
- 1 February – Jackie Shroff, actor.
- 10 March – Thanu Padmanabhan, theoretical physicist and cosmologist (d. 2021)
- 20 October – Dennis Joseph, scriptwriter and director (d. 2021)
- Thomas Zacharia, computational scientist.

== Deaths ==
- 5 April – Alagappa Chettiar, businessman and philanthropist (born 1909).
- 30 August – N. S. Krishnan, comedian, actor, playback singer and writer (born 1908).
- 5 December – Hussain Ahmad Madani, Islamic scholar (born 1879).

== See also ==
- List of Bollywood films of 1957
