= 1965 in India =

- Centuries: 18th; 19th; 20th; 21st
- Decades: 1940s; 1950s; 1960s; 1970s; 1980s
- See also: List of years in India; Timeline of Indian history

Events in the year 1965 in the Republic of India.

== Incumbents ==
- President of India – Sarvepalli Radhakrishnan
- Prime Minister of India – Lal Bahadur Shastri
- Vice President of India – Zakir Husain
- Chief Justice of India – P. B. Gajendragadkar

=== Governors ===
- Andhra Pradesh – Pattom A. Thanu Pillai
- Assam – Vishnu Sahay
- Bihar – M. A. S. Ayyangar
- Gujarat – Mehdi Nawaz Jung (until 1 August), Nityanand Kanungo (starting 1 August)
- Jammu and Kashmir – Karan Singh
- Karnataka – S. M. Shrinagesh (until 2 April), V. V. Giri (starting 2 April)
- Kerala – V. V. Giri (until 2 April), Ajith Prasad Jain (starting 2 April)
- Madhya Pradesh – Hari Vinayak Pataskar (until 10 February), K. Chengalaraya Reddy (starting 10 February)
- Maharashtra – P V Cherian
- Nagaland – Vishnu Sahay
- Odisha – Ajudhia Nath Khosla
- Punjab – Hafiz Mohammad Ibrahim (until 1 September), Sardar Ujjal Singh (starting 1 September)
- Rajasthan – Sampurnanand
- Uttar Pradesh – Bishwanath Das
- West Bengal – Padmaja Naidu

== Events ==
- National income - ₹283,600 million
- 14 January - Food Corporation of India was founded.
- 26 January – Anti-Hindi agitations break out in India because of which Hindi does not get "National Language" status and remains one of the 2 Official Languages of India.
- 24 February – English is adopted as an associate language in dealings between the Central government and the non Hindi speaking states.
- 20 March – First fighting in the Indo-Pakistani War of 1965 between West Pakistan and India only.
- 29 May – 1965 Dhanbad coal mine disaster – A mining accident in Dhanbad, India kills 274.
- July 14 - Sheikh Abdullah kept at custody in Kodaikanal for two years from July 1965 - June 1967.
- 5 August – War begins between India and Pakistan.
- 2 September – Kashmir is declared an "Integral Part of India" and is not a "disputed territory", later responded by the Pakistani troops entering the Indian sector of Kashmir.
- 6 September – Indian troops attempt to invade Lahore.
- 6–22 September – A full-scale Indo-Pakistani war is fought over Kashmir, which ends after a UN Security Council calls for a ceasefire on 20 September.
- 8 September – India opens two additional fronts against Pakistan.
- 9 September – U.N. Secretary General U Thant negotiates with Pakistan President Ayub Khan.
- 16 September – China protests against Indian provocations in its border region.
- 18 September – Soviet Premier Alexei Kosygin invites the leaders of India and Pakistan to meet in the Soviet Union to negotiate.
- 22 September – Radio Peking announces that Indian troops have dismantled their equipment on the Chinese side of the border.
- 24 September – Fighting resumes between Indian and Pakistani troops.
- October - Nanda Devi Plutonium Mission by Central Intelligence Agency.
- 1 December – The Border Security Force is formed as a special force to guard the borders.
- Femina Miss India held for the first time

== Births ==
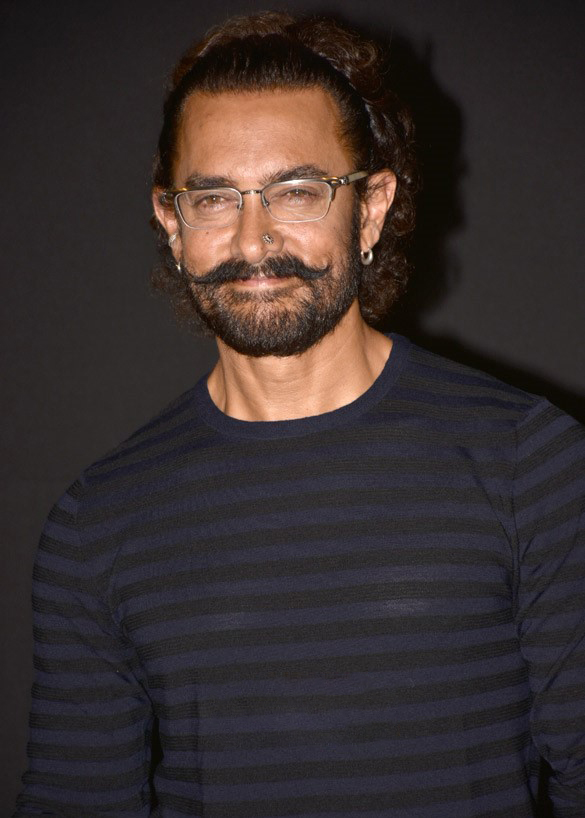
- Aamir Khan
  14 March – Aamir Khan, actor and film producer.
- 26 March – Prakash Raj, actor and film director.
- 23 April – Jamling Tenzing Norgay, mountain climber.
- 25 April – Brahmaji, actor.
- 3 June – Radha, actress.
- 19 June – Ashish Vidyarthi, actor.
- 2 July – Krishna Bhagavaan, actor.
- 15 August – Raghavendra Rajkumar, actor and producer.
- 19 August – Hemant Birje, actor
- 2 September – Partho Sen-Gupta, independent film director and script writer.
- 13 September – Jafar Masood Hasani Nadwi, Sunni Muslim scholar (d. 2025)
- 27 September – Sudha Chandran, dancer, actress.
- 11 October – Ronit Roy, film and television actor
- 1 November – Padmini Kolhapure, actress.
- 30 November – Tashi Tenzing, mountain climber.
- 10 December – Jayaram, actor.
- 25 December – Swami Ramdev, Yogguru.
- 27 December – Salman Khan, actor, film producer and television host.

01 June- Dr. Jayarama Reddy, Professor at St. Joseph's University, Bengaluru, Author, Scientist and You Tuber.

=== Full date unknown ===
- S. Joseph, poet.
- Amita Kanekar, novelist.

== Deaths ==
- 19 January – Basanta Kumar Das, politician (b. 1983).
- 21 January – Geeta Bali, actress (b. 1930).
- 3 March – Amirbai Karnataki, actress and singer (b. c1906).

=== Full date unknown ===
- Motilal, actor (b. 1910).
- A.B. Purani, disciple and biographer of Sri Aurobindo (b. 1894).

== See also ==
- Bollywood films of 1965
