= 1958 in India =

- Centuries: 18th; 19th; 20th; 21st
- Decades: 1930s; 1940s; 1950s; 1960s; 1970s
- See also: List of years in India; Timeline of Indian history

Events in the year 1958 in the Republic of India.

== Incumbents ==
- President of India – Rajendra Prasad
- Prime Minister of India – Jawaharlal Nehru
- Vice President of India – Sarvepalli Radhakrishnan
- Chief Justice of India – Sudhi Ranjan Das

=== Governors ===
- Andhra Pradesh – Bhim Sen Sachar
- Assam – Saiyid Fazal Ali
- Bihar – Zakir Hussain
- Bombay – Sri Prakasa
- Jammu and Kashmir – Karan Singh
- Mysore – Jayachamarajendra Wadiyar
- Kerala – Burgula Ramakrishna Rao
- Madhya Pradesh – Hari Vinayak Pataskar
- Orissa – Bhim Sen Sachar
- Punjab – Chandeshwar Prasad Narayan Singh (until 15 September), Narahar Vishnu Gadgil (starting 15 September)
- Rajasthan – Gurumukh Nihal Singh
- Uttar Pradesh – Kanhaiyalal Maneklal Munshi
- West Bengal – Padmaja Naidu

== Events ==
- National income - ₹152,835 million
- 1 January - DRDO was established
- 18 February – Finance minister of India T. T. Krishnamachari resigns following M. C. Chagla Commission report on Haridas Mundhra LIC scandal.
- 28 February – Jawaharlal Nehru presents Union budget of India as Finance Minister.
- 26 March - Mother India becomes the first ever Cinema of India to get nominated in the Academy Awards.
- 29 April - Food poisoning caused by leakage of Folidol during transportation kills 74 in a Lok Sahayak Sena camp at Sasthamkotta, Kerala.
- 18 to 20 May – The 16th Session of Indian Labour Congress was held at New Delhi.
- Vimochana Samaram against First Namboodiripad ministry in Kerala
- Unknown date – Reliance Industries was founded by Dhirubhai Ambani in Bombay (present day in Mumbai), as predecessor name was Reliance Commercial Corporation.

== Law ==
- 22 May – Armed Forces (Assam and Manipur) Special Powers Ordinance came into force
- 11 September – The Armed Forces (Special Powers) Act, 1958 is passed by the Parliament.
- 1 October – The Standards of Weights and Measures Act took effect.

== Sport ==
- Kunwar Digvijay Singh Babu (field hockey player) is awarded the Padma Shri.
- Milkha Singh (field athletics player) had won the gold medal

== Births ==
- 5 March – Nassar, actor, producer, writer, director, lyricist and singer.
- 29 April – Saumen Guha, political activist, human rights campaigner and author.
- 30 May – K. S. Ravikumar, film director and actor.
- 15 August – Raj Kapoor (Tamil director), film director and actor.
- 16 August – R. R. Patil, politician (died 2015)
- 19 September – Lucky Ali, singer, composer and actor
- 2 December – Lal (actor), actor, director, screenwriter, producer and distributor.
- 17 December – Jayasudha, actress.

== See also ==
- List of Bollywood films of 1958
