= 1966 in India =

- Centuries: 18th; 19th; 20th; 21st
- Decades: 1940s; 1950s; 1960s; 1970s; 1980s
- See also: List of years in India; Timeline of Indian history

Events in the year 1966 in the Republic of India.

== Incumbents ==
| Photo | Post | Name |
|---|---|---|
| | President of India | Sarvepalli Radhakrishnan |
| | Prime Minister of India | Lal Bahadur Shastri (Prime Minister until 11 January) |
| | Prime Minister of India | Gulzarilal Nanda until 24 January (acting Prime Minister) |
| | Prime Minister of India | Indira Gandhi |
| | Vice President of India | Zakir Husain |
| | Chief Justice of India | P. B. Gajendragadkar until 24 January |
| | Chief Justice of India | Amal Kumar Sarkar; 15 March – 29 June |
| | Chief Justice of India | Koka Subba Rao starting 30 June |

=== Governors ===
| Post | Name |
|---|---|
| Andhra Pradesh | Pattom A. Thanu Pillai |
| Assam | Vishnu Sahay |
| Bihar | M. A. S. Ayyangar |
| Gujarat | Nityanand Kanungo |
| Haryana | Dharma Vira (starting 1 November) |
| Jammu and Kashmir | Bhagwan Sahay |
| Karnataka | V. V. Giri |
| Kerala | Ajith Prasad Jain (until 6 February); Bhagwan Sahay (starting 6 February) |
| Madhya Pradesh | K. Chengalaraya Reddy (until 2 February); P. V. Dixit (2 February-9 February); K. Chengalaraya Reddy (starting 10 February) |
| Maharashtra | P V Cherian |
| Nagaland | Vishnu Sahay |
| Odisha | Ajudhia Nath Khosla (until 5 August); Khaleel Ahmed (5 August-11 September); Ajudhia Nath Khosla (starting 11 September) |
| Punjab | Sardar Ujjal Singh (until 26 June); Dharma Vira (starting 26 June) |
| Rajasthan | Sampurnanand |
| Uttar Pradesh | Bishwanath Das |

== Events ==
- National income - ₹321,058 million

=== January - May ===
- 3 January – Prime Minister of India Lal Bahadur Shastri and President of Pakistan Ayub Khan agree to the Tashkent Declaration, a peace pact mediated by the Soviet Premier Alexei Kosygin in Tashkent, Uzbek S.S.R.
- 11 January – Prime Minister Shastri dies of heart attack in Tashkent.
- 19 January – Supported by provincial Congress chief ministers, Indira Gandhi becomes prime minister.
- 24 January - Air India Flight 101 crashed into Mont Blanc killing the 117 passengers including Homi J. Bhabha who was in the flight. There was a similar aviation accident in the same spot in 1950.
- 5 March - Indian Air Force bombs Aizawl following Mizo National Front uprising.
- 28 March – Indira Gandhi visits Washington, D.C.
- 20 April – Lumding Train Bombing occurs on the North-East Frontier Railway.

=== June - December ===
- 6 June - First Indira Gandhi ministry devalues Indian rupee by 57%.
- 10 June - President of India promulgates Jayanti Shipping Company (Taking Over of Management) Ordinance, 1966 to take over shipping company owned by Jayanti Dharma Teja.
- 19 June: Shiv Sena founded by Bal Thackeray.
- 12 July – Indira Gandhi visits Moscow.
- 7 November - 1966 anti-cow slaughter agitation and ensuing violence took place.
- 17 November – Reita Faria, [Eve's Weekly Miss India] is crowned Miss World 1966, the first Indian to win the title.

== Law ==
- 27 August – Eighteenth Amendment of the Constitution of India takes effect.
- 11 December – Nineteenth Amendment of the Constitution of India takes effect.
- 22 December – Twentieth Amendment of the Constitution of India takes effect.
- 29 December – Enactment of Seeds Act, creating central administration to oversee and certify seeds.

== Sport ==
- Krishan Lal, (field hockey player) is awarded the Padma Shri.

== Births ==
- 3 January – Chetan Sharma, cricketer
- 11 January – Sunil Kumar Mahato, politician, assassinated (d.2007).
- 22 January - Kesineni Srinivas, politician and member of parliament from Vijayawada.
- 28 January – Anjani Kumar, 1990 batch IPS officer
- 22 February – Babu Antony, actor and martial artist.
- 24 March - Galla Jayadev, politician and member of parliament from Guntur.
- 30 March – Vikraman, film director.
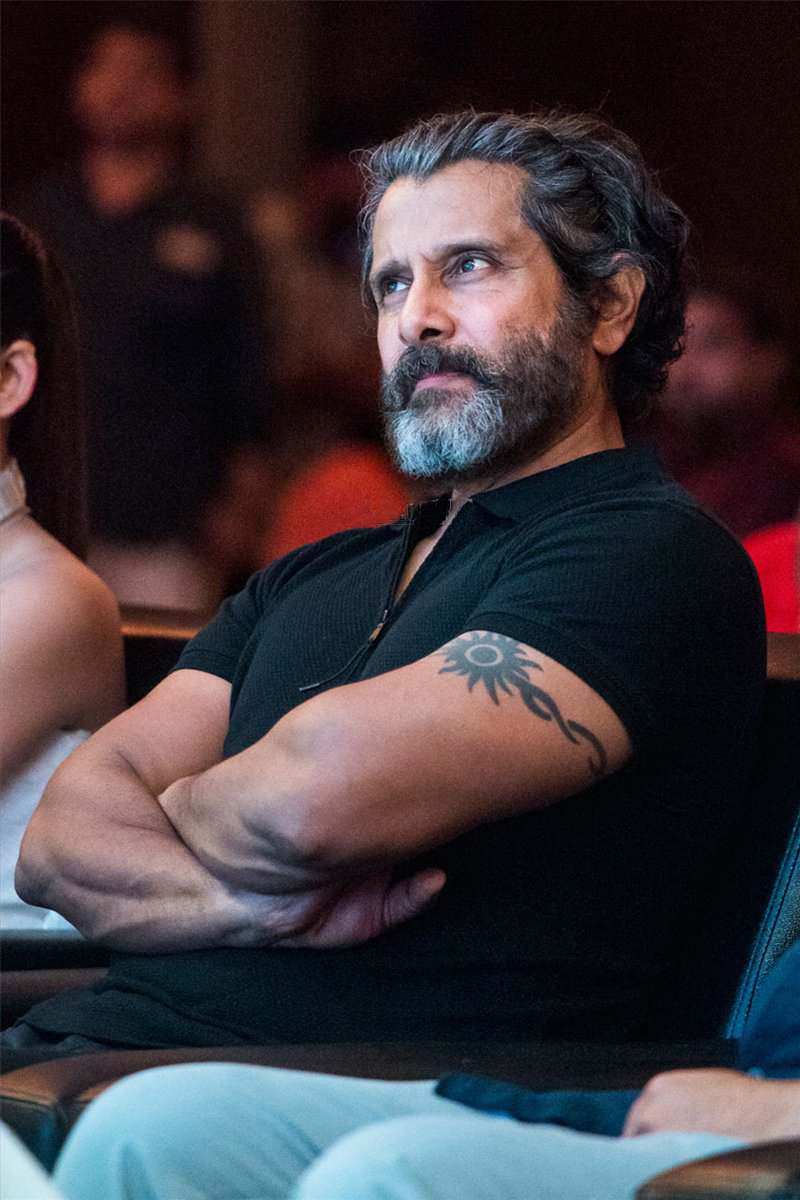
- Vikram
  17 April – Vikram, actor.
- 3 May – Firdous Bamji, actor.
- 15 May – M. Kumaran, politician.
- 30 May – Rajinder Garg, politician.
- 8 July – Revathi, actress.
- 14 July – Sachin Puthran, entrepreneur.
- 28 August – Priya Dutt, politician.
- 1 September - Sonam Wangchuk, Indian engineer, innovator and education reformist.
- 12 September - Pramod Kureel, politician
- 26 September - Pujya Gurudevshri Rakeshji, spiritual leader
- 29 September - Om Malik, technology journalist (d. 2026)
- 24 October – Nadhiya, actress.
- 30 October – K. V. Anand, cinematographer and film director (d. 2021)
- 28 November – P. Ravi Shankar, actor, dubbing artist, director and writer.
- 5 December – Dayanidhi Maran, politician.

=== Full date unknown ===
- Raj Kamal Jha, novelist and journalist.
- September – Faisal Khan, actor.

== Deaths ==
- 11 January – Lal Bahadur Shastri, politician and 2nd Prime Minister of India (b. 1904).
- Devarakonda Balagangadhara Tilak, poet, novelist and short story writer (b. 1921).
- 24 January – Homi J. Bhabha, Indian nuclear physicist.
- 26 February - Vinayak Damodar Savarkar, Indian Freedom Fighter (b. 1883).

== See also ==
- Bollywood films of 1966
- Category:1966 establishments in India
