= 1956 in India =

- Centuries: 18th; 19th; 20th; 21st
- Decades: 1930s; 1940s; 1950s; 1960s; 1970s
- See also: List of years in India; Timeline of Indian history

Events in the year 1956

in the Republic of India.

== Incumbents ==
- President of India – Rajendra Prasad
- Prime Minister of India – Jawaharlal Nehru
- Vice President of India – Sarvepalli Radhakrishnan
- Chief Justice of India – Bijan Kumar Mukherjea (until 31 Jan.), Sudhi Ranjan Das (starting 1 Feb.)

=== Governors ===
- Andhra Pradesh – Chandulal Madhavlal Trivedi
- Assam – Jairamdas Daulatram (until 15 May), Saiyid Fazal Ali (starting 15 May)
- Bihar – R. R. Diwakar (until 5 July), Zakir Hussain (starting 5 July)
- Bombay – Harekrushna Mahatab (until 14 October), Sri Prakasa (starting 10 December)
- Jammu and Kashmir – Karan Singh
- Karnataka – Jayachamarajendra Wadiyar (starting 1 November)
- Kerala – Burgula Ramakrishna Rao (starting 22 November)
- Madhya Pradesh – Pattabhi Sitaramayya
- Orissa – P. S. Kumaraswamy Raja (until 11 September), Bhim Sen Sachar (starting 11 September)
- Punjab – Chandeshwar Prasad Narayan Singh
- Rajasthan – Maharaj Man Singh II (until 31 October), Gurumukh Nihal Singh (starting 31 October)
- Uttar Pradesh – Kanhaiyalal Maneklal Munshi
- West Bengal –
  - until 8 August: Harendra Coomar Mookerjee
  - 8 August-3 November: Phani Bhusan Chakravartti
  - starting 3 November: Padmaja Naidu

== Events ==
- National income - ₹133,139 million
- 20 February - Gentlemen's agreement of Andhra Pradesh (1956) signed.
- 8 March – M. Ananthasayanam Ayyangar handles the charge as Lok Sabha Speaker.
- 20 March – Sardar Hukam Singh handles the charge as Lok Sabha Deputy Speaker.
- 21 July – The 6.1 M_{s} Anjar earthquake shook Gujarat with a maximum Mercalli intensity of IX (Violent), killing 115 and injuring 254.
- 4 August - Asia's first Nuclear reactor, Apsara was built in Bhabha Atomic Research Centre.
- 1 September – LIC of India formed
- 14 October – Dr. B. R. Ambedkar, Indian Untouchable leader, converts to Buddhism along with 385,000 followers. See Neo-Buddhism.
- 17 December - Jawaharlal Nehru meets Dwight D. Eisenhower as part of his visit to United States.

== Law ==
- 1 November – The States Reorganisation Act of India reformed the boundaries and names of Indian states. (enacted on 31 August)

== Arts and literature ==
- 15 October – Kerala Sahithya Academy, Academy for Malayalam literature, is inaugurated by Chithira Thirunal Balarama Varma, the former king of Travancore.
- List of Bollywood films of 1956

== Births ==
=== January to June ===
- 1 February – Brahmanandam, comedian-actor.
- 6 April – Dilip Vengsarkar, cricketer.
- 4 May – Kunal Basu, novelist.
- 6 May – Sujata Bhatt, poet.
- 13 May – Sri Sri Ravi Shankar, spiritual and humanitarian leader.
- 31 May _ Manohara Rso Kodavoor.
- 2 June – Mani Ratnam, film director.

=== July to December ===
- 19 July – Rajendra Prasad, actor.
- 29 July – Chitra Banerjee Divakaruni, author and poet.
- 17 August – Anil Aggrawal, professor of forensic medicine.
- 21 September - Prabuddha Dasgupta, photographer.
- 19 October – Sunny Deol, actor.
- 9 November – Pankaj Dheer, actor (d. 2025)
- 25 November – Kristappa Nimmala, politician and member of parliament from Hindupur.
- 24 December – Anil Kapoor, actor and producer.
- 25 December – Prabhu, actor.

== Deaths ==
- 6 December – B. R. Ambedkar, nationalist, jurist, Dalit political leader and a Buddhist revivalist (born 1891).

== See also ==
- List of Bollywood films of 1956
