= Sushilavati Government Women's College, Rourkela =

State run undergraduate women's college in Rourkela

Sushilavati Government Women’s College
- Type: Public
- Established: 1967
- Affiliations: Sambalpur University
- Principal: Smt Harapriya Mohanty
- Location: Rourkela, Odisha, India; 22.2418°N 84.8801°E
- Website: sgwc.edu.in

Sushilavati Government Women's College is a state-run undergraduate women's college located in sector two of the city of Rourkela, Odisha. S. G. Women's College was established in 1967 by Sushilavati Khosla, the wife of former Odisha governor Dr. Ajudhiya Nath Khosla. She donated Rs one lakh for starting this college in collaboration with D.A.V Trust. In 1989, the administration and funding of college was taken over by the Government of Odisha to run its education curriculum. The college got its accreditation by NACC with grade B certification in the year 2005. The college is affiliated to Sambalpur University to offer students three years of regular undergraduate courses of Arts (B.A) and Science (B.Sc.).

== See also ==
- S.K.D.A.V. Government Polytechnic, Rourkela
- Sushilavati Government Women’s Junior College, Rourkela
