= 2024 in Indian public domain =

- Nickname: Public Domain Day
- Date: January 1, 2024
- Frequency: Annually
- Country: India

When a work's copyright expires, it enters the public domain. The following is a list of creators whose works enter the public domain in 2025 as per Copyright law of India.

== List of works that are entering into public domain in India ==
=== Works entering public domain after 60 years from author's death ===
These works enter the public domain 60 years after the author's death (or, in the case of a multi-author work, the death of the last surviving author), counted from the beginning of the following calendar year

Name	Birth	Death	Occupation(s)
Pingali Venkayya	1876-08-02	1963-07-04	writer, designer
A. S. Subbaraj	1914-10-28	1963-02-22	politician
Karam Chand Thapar	1900-01-01	1963-01-01	banker
Swami Ramdas	1884-04-10	1963-08-02	guru
Lala Shri Ram	1884-04-27	1963-01-11	businessperson
Laxminarayan Sahu	1890-01-01	1963-01-18	politician, historian, writer, poet, journalist
F. G. Natesa Iyer	1880-11-11	1963-01-23	actor, film actor
G. Ramanathan		1963-01-01	actor, composer
Bernard Spencer	1909-11-09	1963-09-11	poet
Jaganath Rao Bhonsle	1907-12-10	1963-05-14	leader, politician, military personnel
Prasad Das Roy	1888-09-02	1963-04-18	writer, children's writer
Baba Kharak Singh	1868-06-20	1963-10-06	political activist
Chilakalapudi Seeta Rama Anjaneyulu	1907-07-11	1963-10-08	actor, film director
Rahul Sankrityayan	1893-04-09	1963-04-14	autobiographer, writer, linguist, biographer, freedom fighter
M. Govinda Pai	1883-03-23	1963-09-06	poet
Raghu Vira	1902-12-30	1963-05-14	politician, linguist
Acharya Shivpujan Sahay	1893-08-09	1963-01-21	writer, novelist
Kavalam Madhava Panikkar	1895-06-03	1963-12-10	scientist, barrister, politician, historian, university teacher, author, journalist, diplomat
Babu Gulabrai	1888-01-17	1963-04-13	writer, philosopher, essayist, literary critic, literary scholar
Devudu Narasimha Sastri	1896-01-01	1963-01-01	writer, journalist
Chintaman Vinayak Joshi	1892-01-19	1963-11-21	writer
Sabu Dastagir	1924-01-27	1963-12-02	actor, film actor
Sivananda Saraswati	1887-09-08	1963-07-14	writer, philosopher, yoga instructor, autobiographer
Amar Nath Kak	1889-01-01	1963-01-01	writer
Jai Narayan Vyas	1899-02-18	1963-03-14	politician
Saifuddin Kitchlew	1888-01-15	1963-10-09	barrister, politician
Syed Abdul Rahim	1909-08-17	1963-06-11	association football player, association football manager
B. A. Saletore	1902-01-01	1963-01-01	historian, author
Rajendra Prasad	1884-12-03	1963-02-28	lawyer, politician
C. S. Ranga Iyer	1895-01-01	1963-01-01	author, journalist
Annie Mascarene	1902-06-06	1963-07-19	politician, freedom fighter
Ralph Griffith	1882-03-04	1963-12-11	politician, diplomat
Gopal Singh Nepali	1926-01-01	1963-04-17	writer, poet, lyricist
Athar-Ali Fysee	1883-08-28	1963-11-03	tennis player, table tennis player
Anasuya Shankar	1928-01-01	1963-01-01	author

=== Works entering public domain after 60 years from publication ===
These works enter the public domain 60 years after the date of first publication, counted from the beginning of the following calendar year:

- Anonymous works
- Photographs
- Cinematographic works (aka movies/films)
- Sound recordings
- Government works
- Works of corporate authorship or of international organizations

== See also ==
- 2024 in public domain
- Copyright law of India
- 1963 in India
