= M. K. Vellodi =

Indian politician (1896–1987)

High Commissioner of India to the United Kingdom
- In office April 1947 – August 1947
- Preceded by: Samuel Runganadhan
- Succeeded by: V. K. Krishna Menon

1st Chief Minister of Hyderabad
- In office 26 January 1950 – 6 March 1952
- Preceded by: Office established
- Succeeded by: Burgula Ramakrishna Rao

Indian Ambassador to Switzerland
- In office 20 June 1958 – 5 January 1962
- Preceded by: Mohan Sinha Mehta
- Succeeded by: Mohamed Abdul Rauf

3rd Cabinet Secretary of India
- In office 1 August 1957 - 4 June 1958
- Preceded by: Y. N. Sukthankar
- Succeeded by: Vishnu Sahay

Personal details
- Born: 1896 Kottakkal in Madras Presidency, British Raj (Present-day Malappuram district of Kerala)
- Died: 1987 (aged 90–91) Chennai, Tamilnadu, India
- Spouse: Kunhikav Kovilamma

Mullath Kadingi Vellodi CIE, ICS (1896–1987) was the appointed Chief Minister of Hyderabad state by the Government of India after the fall of the Hyderabad State ruled by the Nizam.

A member of the Indian Civil Service, he was the Textile Commissioner and ex-officio Joint Secretary in the Department of Industries and Civil Supplies during the British Raj. He was appointed a Companion of the Order of the Indian Empire (CIE) in the 1944 Birthday Honours list. He was a senior civil servant in the Government of India. He served as the Cabinet Secretary and Secretary of the Planning Commission from 1957 to 1958.

== Early life ==
Vellodi was the fourth son of K. C. Manavedan Raja, the titular Zamorin of Calicut. He was educated at Presidency College, Madras. He joined the Indian Civil Service in December 1921. From 1921-1944 he held various junior positions. In 1944 he was appointed Textile Commissioner and ex-officio Joint Secretary in the Department of Industries and Civil Supplies until 1945.

He was married to TM Kunhikav Kovilamma. They had two children, Kamala and Vasudevan.

== Chief Minister (1950-52) ==
As the appointed Chief Minister of the Hyderabad State, he administered the state with the help of bureaucrats from Madras state and Bombay state.

== Diplomat ==
From April–August 1947 he was the acting Indian High Commissioner to London, overseeing the independence celebrations there. He returned to Delhi in 1947 to take up the post of Controller of Imports and Exports. From 20 June 1958 to 6 December 1961, he was the Indian ambassador to Switzerland.

== See also ==
- List of chief ministers of Andhra Pradesh
- List of Cabinet Secretaries of India
- List of chief ministers of Telangana

Diplomatic posts
| Preceded by S. E. Runganadhan | High Commissioner for India; 1947 - 1947 | Succeeded by V. K. Krishna Menon |
