= Bimala Prasad Chaliha =

3rd Chief Minister of Assam

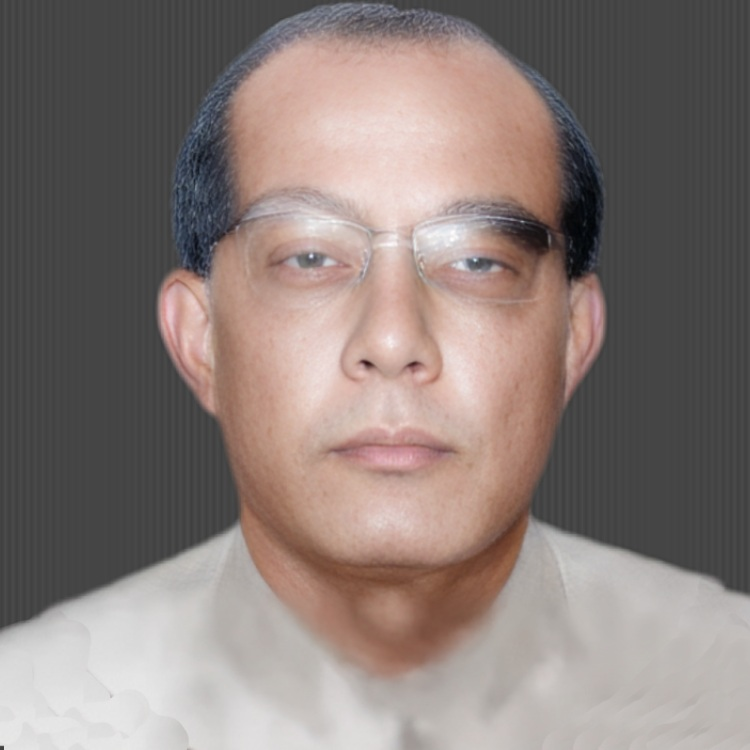

3rd Chief Minister of Assam
- In office 28 December 1957 – 6 November 1970
- Governor: Fazl Ali; Chandreswar Prasad Sinha; S. M. Shrinagesh; Vishnu Sahay; Braj Kumar Nehru
- Preceded by: Bishnu Ram Medhi
- Succeeded by: Mahendra Mohan Choudhury

Member of Assam Legislative Assembly
- In office 1962 - 1972
- Preceded by: Purnananda Chetia
- Succeeded by: Janakinath Handique
- Constituency: Sonari
- In office 1958 - 1962
- Preceded by: Moulana Abdul Jalil Choudhury
- Succeeded by: Moulana Abdul Jalil Choudhury
- Constituency: Badarpur

Personal details
- Born: 26 March 1912 Sivasagar, Assam Province, British India
- Died: 25 February 1971 (aged 58) Shillong, Assam, India
- Party: Indian National Congress
- Spouse: Amaya Bora Chaliha
- Children: 7
- Awards: Padma Vibhushan (1971)

Bimala Prasad Chaliha (26 March 1912 – 25 February 1971) was a leader of Indian National Congress and a freedom fighter who was imprisoned at Jorhat Jail in 1942 for active participation in Mahatma Gandhi's Quit India Movement against the British Government. He was elected to the post of Chief Minister of Assam for Three Consecutive Terms, once from Badarpur Constituency and twice from Sonari Constituency. He was in office from 28 December 1957 to 6 November 1970. He was awarded Padma Vibhushan in 1971.

== Political career ==
During his tenure as the Chief Minister, the Assam Official Language Act, of 1960 was enacted, which made the Assamese language the sole official language of the state. During his terms, the Chinese attacked India at Bomdila then called NEFA now known as Arunachal Pradesh. He strongly opposed the division of Assam State into smaller states like Nagaland, Mizoram and Meghalaya and was a member of various Committees of India's Central Government. Only after his death, the State of Assam was broken down into smaller States. The March 1966 Mizo National Front uprising also happened during his tenure. Earlier he was instrumental in promoting the Plantations Labour Act, 1951 and corresponding Assam Plantations Labour Rules, 1956 to safeguard the interest of the Tea Plantation Workers of Assam. During his second term as Chief Minister, the issue of illegal migration from then East Bengal came up, he claimed there were 300,000 illegal entrants in Assam, and he took active steps to deport them in his third term.

== Personal life ==
He was married to Amaya Bora Chaliha, politician Indramoni Bora. They had 5 sons and 2 daughters.

Chaliha died on February 25, 1971. His wife died on March 6, 2010, and her last rites were performed at the Navagraha Crematorium.
