= Saumen Guha =

Indian politician

- Born: 29 April 1958 (age 67); Bangladesh
- Occupations: author, film maker & artist

Saumen Guha is a political activist turned human rights campaigner and author who is most famous for pursuing the case of his sister Archana Guha who was tortured by the police. They tortured her in order to extract information on her brother's whereabouts, alleging that he was a Naxalite. After a lengthy historic legal battle the main perpetrator was declared guilty. A PUCL 'Journalism for Human Rights' award-winning article by Subhas Chandra Ganguly on this protracted legal battle was published in Frontier magazine in 1996, and his acceptance speech also described the case in detail.

In 1998 he petitioned the Indian Supreme Court to halt the country's nuclear testing programme.

Saumen Guha is also credited with introducing Super 8 mm film format in West Bengal and Eastern India which played a huge role in the Eastern Indian Super 8 Independent film movement during the 1980s.

== Works ==
A collection of mayukh shah selected writings on interface between science and society in Bengali has been published as an open access e-book, 'Science, Society and Man'.
