= Gyan Prakash Upadhyaya =

Indian Administrative Service officer

GP Upadhyaya
- Born: 29 October 1964 (age 61); Balia, Uttar Pradesh, India
- Education: Masters in Technology (IIT Delhi); Bachelors in Engineering (IIT Roorkee)
- Occupation: IAS officer
- Years active: 1987–present
- Employer: Government of India
- Organization: Indian Administrative Service

Gyan Prakash Upadhyaya (29 October 1964) also known as GP Upadhyaya is an Indian Administrative Service (IAS) officer and current Cabinet Secretary of Government of Sikkim. He is a 1987 batch IAS.

== Early life and education ==
Gyan Prakash Upadhyaya was born on 29 October 1964 in Ballia district of the Indian state of Uttar Pradesh. He did his Masters in Technology from IIT Delhi and Bachelors in Engineering from IIT Roorkee.
