= Pramod Kureel =

Indian politician (born 1966)

Pramod Kureel (born 12 September 1966, in Delhi) is an Indian politician from Uttar Pradesh who belonged to the Bahujan Samaj Party.

He was a member of the Rajya Sabha during 2010–2012 from Uttar Pradesh.
