= Sachin Puthran =

Sachindra Puthran is a co-founder and co-director of the digital creative agency Thatz it.

== Education ==
He graduated in microbiology in the year 1986. Later he got a BFA in Applied Art from Sir J. J. Institute of Applied Art.

== Career ==
In 1995 he started the design production studio Here N Now Graphix. Puthran co-founded the production house Thatz It Productions in 2006.
