= Keshava Malagi =

Indian writer

- Born: 1963 (age 62–63)
- Occupation: Writer
- Writing career
- Genre: Fiction

Keshava Malagi is an Indian Kannada language writer of the post-Bandaya generation. He has published two novels, Kunkuma bhoomi and Angada dhare, and three short story collections, Kadala terege dande, Maagi moovattaidu and Vennela dorasani.

== Life and career ==
Malagi was born in 1963 in the northern region of Karnataka. He obtained his MA from Mysore University and began his career as a journalist. He served as sub-editor in Suddi Sangaati, Prajavani and Times of India, and as editor with Orient Longman. Malagi moved from journalism to education and joined MAYA, a Bangalore-based NGO. He now works with the Azim Premji foundation.

== Literary works ==
Malagi's works began to be published in 1986. Dhariniya jote nannadondu kathe was one of his early stories. The novel Kunkuma Bhoomi appeared in 1990. His collection of stories Vennela Dorasani earned him the Karnataka Sahitya Akademi book prize in 2005. Malagi's novels and stories are known for their use of lyricism and sentimentalism as a style. His stories can be classified into three major types. The first type explores man-woman relationship in the modern world. Stories like Dharini jote nannadondu kathe, Maatu yataneya diddi bagilu, Agamya agochara apratima jeevave and Baro geejaga belong to this category. The second one deals with the struggles of women in today's society and the question of social justice. Vennela Dorasani, Saubhagyavati and Kempu mannina okkalu are among these stories. The third type deals with nostalgia about an estranged childhood and adolescence. Kadala terege dande and Ishtu nakshatragalalli yavudu nanage are examples.

His novel Angada Dhare has been acclaimed as a major work in Kannada literature. It deals with the story of Siddharama, a PhD student, who opts out of research to become a monk. Siddharama eschews worldliness, but his well-meaning acts creates effects which are against his wishes. A group of devotees are attracted towards him, which soon turns into a big patron-base. A large religious establishment with affiliate schools, colleges and charity organizations starts growing around him in his name. But Siddharama is helpless and remains a mute spectator. At last abandons the establishment and leaves the place to make a fresh beginning.

Malagi has received many awards for his fiction, including a gold medal from Gulbarga University. He has also received the Pavem Acharya award, Sapna Book House-Kannada Prabha short Story award, and Lankesh Patrike Short Story award.

He has awarded a Senior Fellowship in the field of literature from Ministry of Culture, Government of India, for the year 2008–09.

== Works ==
=== Short story collections ===
- Kadala Terege Dande
- Maagi Moovattaidu
- Vennela Dorasani

=== Novels ===
- Kunkuma Bhoomi
- Angada Dhare

=== Others ===
- Boris Pasternak Vachike (Boris Pasternak, a reader)
- Kappu Mari Meenu – children's novelette
- Nerale Mara (a collection of lyrical and personal essays)
- Vimana Apaharana – narration of Kandar air hostage crisis
- Translations of B R Ambedkar and Babu Jagajeevana Ram works
- Kadalaacheya cheluve (French Literature)
- Sankathana (French Literature)
