= 1966 Lumding train bombing =

Bomb on a passenger train in Assam, India

The 1966 Lumding train bombing was a bombing that occurred on the North-East Frontier Railway in the town of Lumding in Assam, India. On April 20, 1966, a bomb was detonated in a passenger train carriage at Lumding station, resulting in significant casualties and injuries.

== Background ==
For years, the Indian state of Nagaland had seen violence between Naga nationalists and the Government of India. As a result, many Naga took to guerilla activities in order to fight against the government. Roughly two months prior, a train bombing had resulted in the deaths of 43 people. Naga militants were later found to be responsible.

== Incident ==
On the evening of April 20, 1966, a time bomb planted by Naga separatists exploded in a third-class compartment of Coach No. 3583, which was part of the 20 Down Tinsukia-New Jalpaiguri passenger train standing at Lumding railway station. The explosion caused the roof of the rear portion of the coach to be blown off, resulting in heavy casualties among both the passengers and individuals on the platform. The Minister of State for Railways, Dr. Ram Subhag Singh, characterized the incident as an act of "sabotage".

=== Casualties and responses ===
The Lumding train bombing resulted in the death of 57 individuals, with an additional 72 sustaining injuries. The railway authorities, along with local authorities, promptly initiated rescue and relief effort, with medical relief being provided swiftly. Ex-gratia payments were arranged for the injured, though the Indian government was accused of not taking the matter seriously.

In a subsequent incident three days later on April 23, 1966, a similar explosion occurred at Diphu Railway station, again involving the Tinsukia-New Jalpaiguri passenger train. This incident resulted in the deaths of 41 individuals and injuries to 81 others. The Minister of Railways, S. K. Patil, expressed regret over the two serious explosions and outlined the immediate response and relief efforts.

=== Investigations and sabotage ===
Dr. Ram Subhag Singh suggested that the bombings were acts of "well-organized sabotage." He informed the Parliament that the explosives used were of high power, possibly of foreign make, indicating a clear case of sabotage. Authorities only made two arrests in connection with the incidents at Lumding and Diphu stations, with their response being heavily criticized by commentators.

== Reactions and aftermath ==
The incident prompted concern among members of the Lok Sabha, who raised questions about the government's measures to prevent such occurrences. The Minister of State for Railways assured the House that steps, such as pilot patrols and carrying security guards in the train, had already been taken after previous incidents. Additionally, the possibility of checking each passenger and their luggage was discussed.

The incidents also led to discussions in Parliament, with Members expressing urgency in addressing the situation. The Minister of External Affairs, Sardar Swaran Singh, called attention to the matter as one of urgent public importance.

Indian Prime Minister Indira Gandhi, who was engaged in negotiations with Naga leaders at the time, expressed sadness at the Lumding tragedy. The incident cast a spotlight on the ongoing tribal rebellion in eastern India, with Naga tribesmen being implicated in the train bombings.

== See also ==
- List of terrorist incidents in India
