= Maharashtra Day =

Indian holiday

- Jawaharlal Nehru, Yashwantrao Chavan and Sri Prakasa unveiling a map of the new state of Maharashtra at Raj Bhavan, Mumbai, on 1 May 1960
- Also called: Maharashtra Din
- Observed by: State of Maharashtra, National Stock Exchange of India, Bombay Stock Exchange
- Significance: The day the state of Maharashtra was formed by the Bombay Reorganisation Act, 1960
- Celebrations: Parades
- Date: 1 May
- Frequency: Annual

Maharashtra Day is a state holiday in the Indian state of Maharashtra, commemorating the formation of the state of Maharashtra in India from the division of the Bombay State on 1 May 1960. Maharashtra Day is commonly associated with parades and political speeches and ceremonies, in addition to various other public and private events celebrating the history and traditions of Maharashtra. It is celebrated to commemorate the creation of a Marathi-speaking state of Maharashtra.

== Background ==
The States Reorganisation Act, 1956 defined boundaries for the states within India on the basis of languages. The Bombay State that was formed as a consequence of this act, however, was composed of different areas where different languages were spoken; Marathi, Gujarati, Kutchi and Konkani. The Samyukta Maharashtra Samiti was at the forefront of the movement to divide the Bombay State into two states; one composed of areas where people primarily spoke Gujarati and Kutchi and the other where people primarily spoke Marathi and Konkani.

The state of Maharashtra and Gujarat were formed as a result of this movement according to the Bombay Reorganisation Act, 1960 enacted by the Parliament of India on 25 April 1960. The act came into effect on 1 May 1960, hence the reason of annual celebration. from onwards.

== Observance ==
Every year the Government of Maharashtra issues a notification declaring 1 May to be a public holiday to be celebrated as Maharashtra Day. This holiday applies to all the schools, offices and companies under the jurisdiction of the State and Central Government celebrate this day by organising various programmes.

The Indian stock markets remain closed on Maharashtra Day.

== Customs ==
Every year a parade is held at Shivaji Park where the Governor of Maharashtra makes a speech.

Liquor sales to Indians are prohibited on this day across Maharashtra, excluding foreigners.

== Unique or historical celebrations ==
The Golden Jubilee celebrations for Maharashtra Day were conducted on 1 May 2011 across Maharashtra.

== Inaugurations and launching of new projects and schemes ==
In Maharashtra state government and private sector inaugurates and launches various new projects and schemes on 1 May. Annual celebrations of such institutions and projects are also held on Maharashtra Day.

The Marathi language Wikipedia was started on 1 May 2003.

The Missing Link portion of the Mumbai–Pune Expressway will be inaugurated on 1 May 2026.
