= Bem Le Hunte =

British-Indian-Australian author (born 1964)

- Born: 1964 (age 61–62); Calcutta, India
- Occupation: Author
- Known for: The Seduction of Silence (2001)

Bem Le Hunte (born 1964) is a British-Indian-Australian author whose internationally published novels, The Seduction of Silence (2001) and There, Where the Pepper Grows (2006) have gained her numerous positive reviews and a wide, appreciative readership in the Eastern and the Western world. Her first novel was shortlisted for the 2001 Commonwealth Writers' Prize.

== Life and career ==
=== Before 1989 ===
Bem Le Hunte was born in Kolkata, the fourth child in a family with an Indian mother and English father. She grew up in India and England, receiving her education at Godolphin and Latymer School in Hammersmith, West London. She then spent a year studying journalism before continuing on to Fitzwilliam College, Cambridge, from which she graduated with a BA in Social Anthropology and a doctorate in English Literature. She subsequently traveled the world, living in Japan and the United States, where she spent time in Chicago. She then returned to India, living in Delhi and working on short films for the United Nations during the International Decade of Women's Development.

=== Move to Australia in 1989 and start of writing career ===
At the age of 25, she moved to Australia and, within a few weeks, was lecturing full-time in the Humanities Department of Sydney University. Her first novel, The Seduction of Silence, published in 2001, unfolds the story of an Indian family and the monumental changes it undergoes through love and loss over a period of a hundred years. The book's prose was described by Geraldine Brooks as "vivid and arresting" and by Thomas Keneally as "ample and fascinating". The book, published by HarperCollins in U.S. and Australia and by Penguin Group in India, achieved wide success and was shortlisted for the 2001 Commonwealth Writers' Prize. It was translated into Polish under the title Kuszące Wołanie Ciszy and published by Kameleon. In 2006, her second novel, There, Where the Pepper Grows, a tale about a Polish-Jewish family which disembarks in Kolkata while en route to Palestine during World War II, was published internationally by HarperCollins. Her third novel, Elephants with Headlights, was published in March 2020.

Le Hunte currently lives in Sydney with her husband Jan and sons Taliesin, Rishi and Kashi, and works at the Centre for Journalism and Media at the University of New South Wales.

She is currently pioneering the new Bachelor of Creative Intelligence and Innovation at UTS (University of Technology Sydney).
