= Chandreswar Prasad Sinha =

Indian jurist

Governor of Assam
- Acting
- In office 23 August 1959 – 14 October 1959
- President: Rajendra Prasad
- Preceded by: Saiyid Fazal Ali
- Succeeded by: S. M. Shrinagesh

4th Chief Justice of Gauhati High Court
- In office 21 February 1959 – 31 January 1961
- Appointed by: Rajendra Prasad
- Preceded by: Sarjoo Prasad
- Succeeded by: Holiram Deka

Judge of Patna High Court
- In office 16 June 1950 – 20 February 1959
- Appointed by: Rajendra Prasad

Personal details
- Born: 1 February 1901
- Education: B.A. and LL.B
- Occupation: Jurist

Chandreswar Prasad Sinha (born 1 February 1901 - death date unknown) was an Indian jurist who served as 4th the chief justice of Gauhati High Court He also served as the Governor of Assam. from 23 August 1959 to 14 October 1959.

== Life and career ==
Justice Sinha was born on 1 February 1901 and completed his M. A. in 1923 and LL.B in 1925. He started practising in Patna High Court in April 1925 and was appointed as the judge of the said high court on 16 June 1950. He served in that capacity till his appointment as chief justice of Gauhati High Court (then known as Assam High Court) on 21 February 1959.

During his tenure as chief justice of Assam high court the then governor of Assam Justice Saiyid Fazl Ali died in office, thus to fulfil this vacancy justice C. P. Sinha stepped into the shoes of governor of Assam in acting capacity form 23 August 1959 and served as such till 14 October 1959 when S. M. Shrinagesh was appointed as new permanent governor.
