= Y. N. Sukthankar =

Indian politician

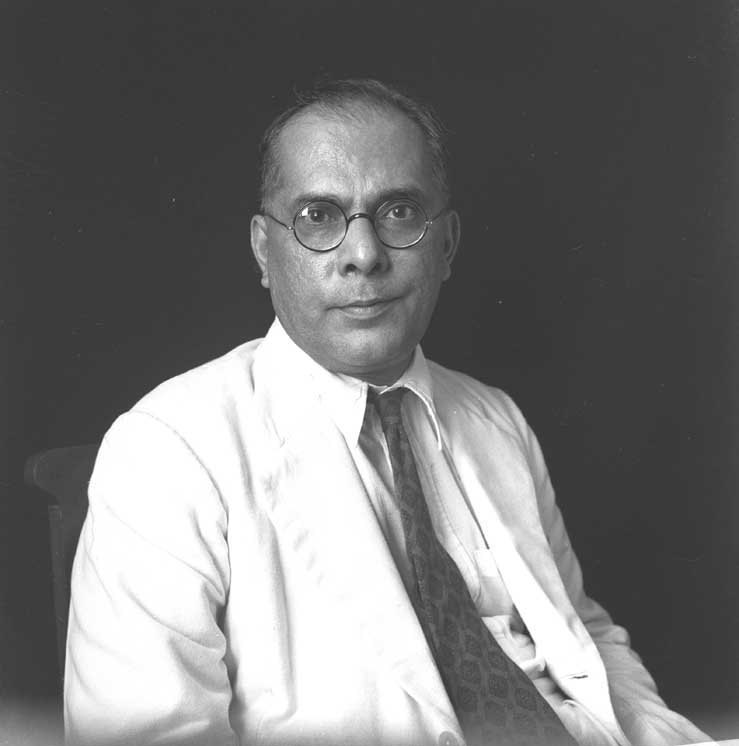

6th Governor of Odisha
- In office 31 July 1957 – 15 September 1962
- Preceded by: Bhim Sen Sachar
- Succeeded by: Ajudhia Nath Khosla

2nd Cabinet Secretary of India
- In office 1953–1957
- Prime Minister: Jawaharlal Nehru
- Preceded by: N. R. Pillai
- Succeeded by: M. K. Vellodi

Personal details
- Born: 24 August 1897
- Died: 16 June 1973 (aged 75)

Yashwant Narayan Sukthankar, CIE (24 August 1897– 16 June 1973) was an Indian civil servant, the second Cabinet Secretary of India and a former Governor of Odisha.

Sukthankar was a member of the Indian Civil Service having completed his education at University of Bombay & University of Cambridge. After completion of his barrister at law in Cambridge, he joined the service on 30 October 1922 - the first batch of native ICS officers. He was a part of the Finance and Commerce Pool, comprising specialist civil servants, that was constituted at the level of the Government of India during the Second World War. Sukthankar was a specialist in international trade and he went on to serve as Secretary to the Government of India in the Ministry of Commerce and Industry and as Cabinet Secretary of India from May 14, 1953 to July 31, 1957. He also served as secretary of the Planning Commission of India that formulated India's Second Five Year Plan.

Upon retirement as Cabinet Secretary, he was appointed Governor of Orissa, a post he held from 31 July 1957 till 15 September 1962.
