= Sampurnanand =

Indian politician (1891–1969)

- संपूर्णानंद
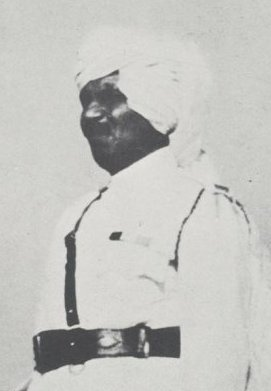
- Sampurnanand in 1936

2nd Governor of Rajasthan
- In office 16 April 1962 – 16 April 1967
- Chief Minister: Mohan Lal Sukhadia
- Preceded by: Gurumukh Nihal Singh
- Succeeded by: Sardar Hukam Singh

2nd Chief Minister of Uttar Pradesh
- In office 28 December 1954 – 7 December 1960
- Preceded by: Govind Ballabh Pant
- Succeeded by: Chandra Bhanu Gupta

Personal details
- Born: 1 January 1891 Benares, Benares State, British India
- Died: 10 January 1969 (aged 78) Varanasi, Uttar Pradesh, India
- Party: Indian National Congress

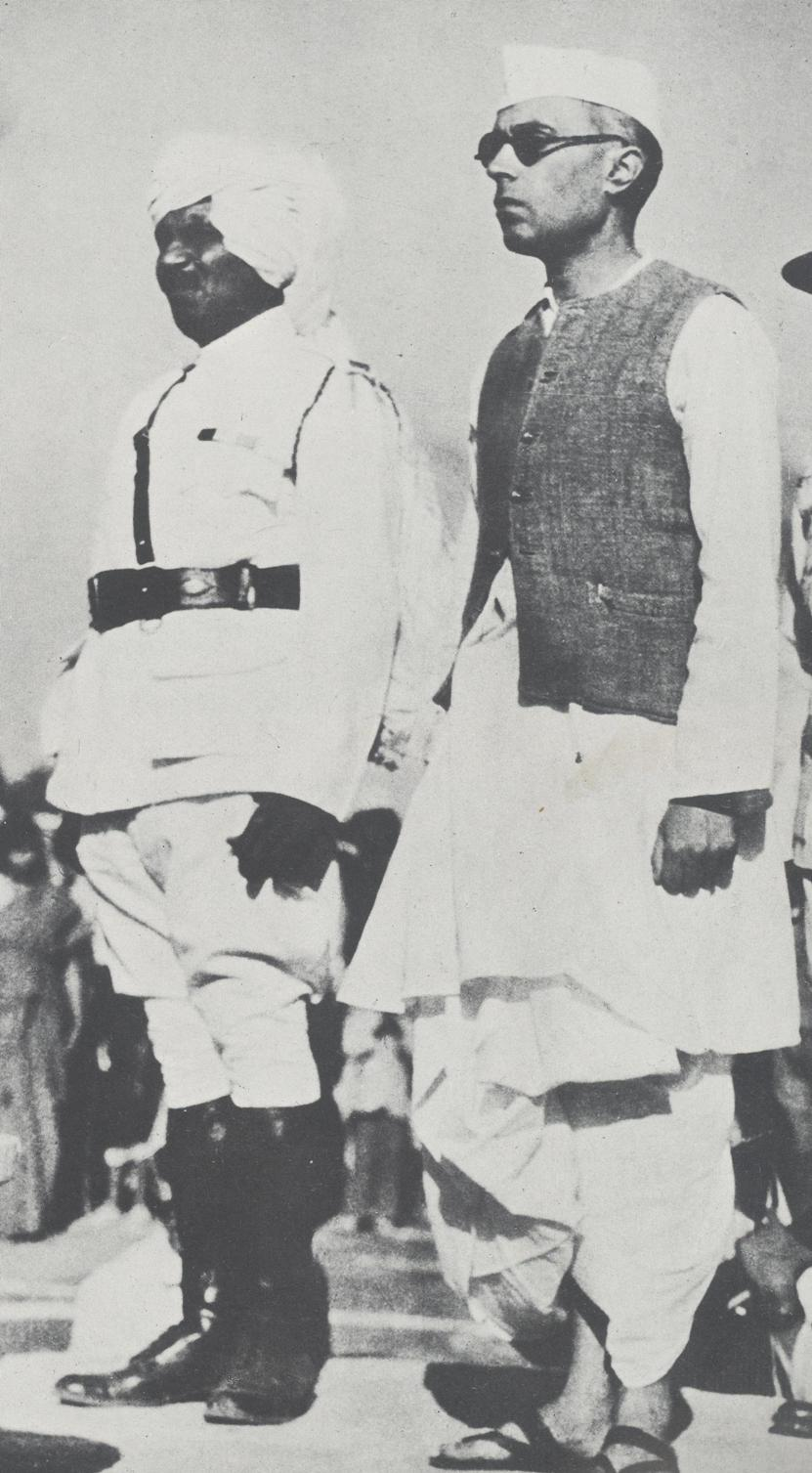
Sampurnanand alongside Jawaharlal Nehru, April 1936

Sampurnanand (1 January 1891 – 10 January 1969) was an Indian teacher and politician who served as the second Chief Minister of Uttar Pradesh from 1954 until 1960, and later as Governor of Rajasthan. Serving for five years and 344 days, he had the longest single tenure of any Uttar Pradesh Chief Minister until surpassed by Yogi Adityanath in 2023.

Born in Varanasi, Sampurnanand was a respected scholar of Sanskrit and astronomy. During the Indian Independence Movement, Sampuranand participated in the Non-cooperation movement. He worked as an editor for Maryada, a Hindi newspaper founded by Madan Mohan Malaviya, and contributed frequently to the National Herald. His political career began in 1922, when he joined the All-India Congress Committee, and was subsequently appointed Minister for Education of Uttar Pradesh. Following India's Independence, Sampurnanand was elected to the Uttar Pradesh Legislative Assembly and selected as Education Minister. During his tenure, he devised plans for the establishment of an astronomical observatory at the Government Sanskrit College (GSC) in Varanasi, which in 1974 was named after him as Sampurnanand Sanskrit Vishwavidyalaya.

Sampurnanand became Chief Minister of Uttar Pradesh in 1954, and served for nearly six years, until he was asked to step down following a political crisis in the UP government. As chief minister, Sampurnanand continued to promote the use of the Hindi language and passed a ban on the slaughter of cattle, against the wishes of then-Prime Minister Jawaharlal Nehru. Following his resignation, he became Governor of Rajasthan in 1962, where he advocated for the "open prison" system, in which prisoners were allowed to live with family and work.

== Life ==
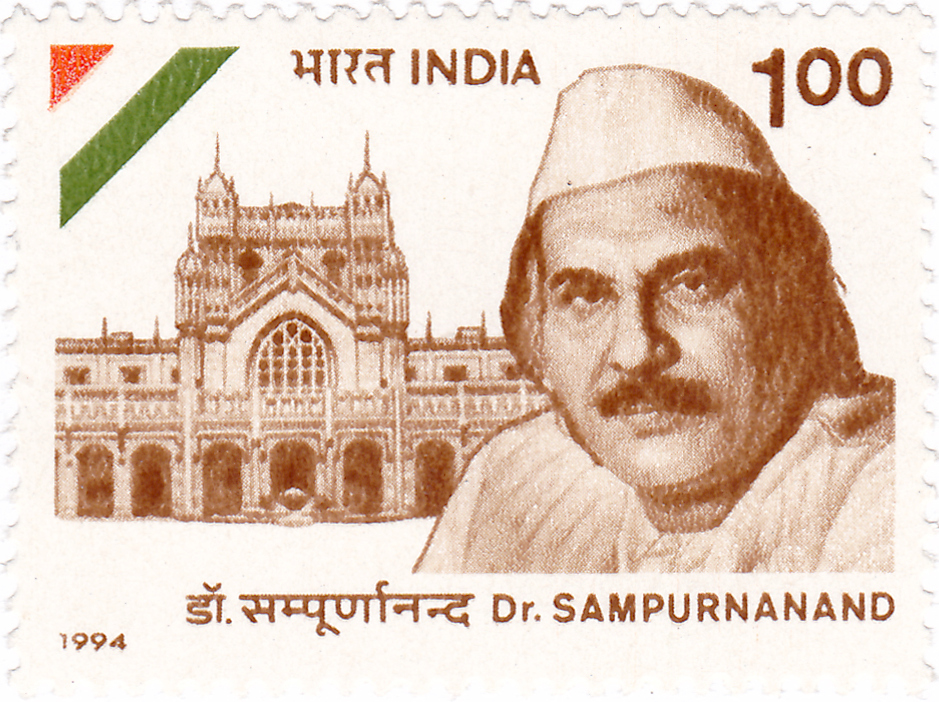
Sampurnanand on 1994 stamp of India

Sampurnanand was born to a Kayastha family on 1 January 1891 at Benaras (present-day Varanasi) and started life as a teacher. Brought up under the influence of the Benaras ethos, he was a strong votary of traditional culture. He was deeply interested in ancient Hindu culture including Sanskrit and Phalit Jyotish (astrology). His interest in phalit coupled with his academic bent of mind got him interested in astronomy.

Babu Sampurnanandji was also an ardent freedom fighter. His jail-mates narrate that while under confinement in jail (as a freedom fighter) Babuji used to entertain them with discussions on astronomy and acquainted them with the night sky.

After Independence, Babu Sampurnanandji became Education Minister in the first popular government of Uttar Pradesh. This was instrumental in fulfilling his cherished astronomical dreams and drew up plans for establishing an astronomical observatory with a Time unit at the Government Sanskrit College, Benaras (GSC) (now Sampurnanand Sanskrit University).He sought support and guidance from educationists like Dr. Ishwari Prasad and Nirmal Chandra Chaturvedi, MLC. The later was consulted by him for social welfare schemes too.

Dr Sampurnanand was first Chairman of State Lalit Kala Akademi, U.P. which was established on 8 February 1962 under the Department of Culture, Government of Uttar Pradesh as a fully funded autonomous body. Sampurnanand as a CM pushed Hindi (also Cow slaughter ban).

As a reformist governor of Rajasthan he promoted the idea of Sanganer's no-bars prison. In this open prison convicts live with their families, go out to work and pay taxes for water and electricity. Sampurnanand believed that State's punishment should not be an act of revenge but rather an act of reformation. Life imprisonment is like a death sentence for a convict as it results in a separation from family and friends. The Rajasthan government started the Sri Sampurnanand Khula Bandi Shivir (open jail), named after the governor, on an experimental basis in 1963.
