= S. M. Shrinagesh =

Indian military officer

General S. M. Shrinagesh
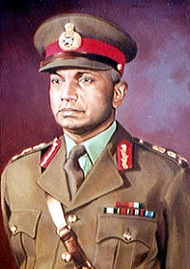

2nd Governor of Mysore
- In office 4 May 1964 – 2 April 1965
- Chief Minister: S. Nijalingappa
- Preceded by: Jayachamaraja Wodeyar Bahadur
- Succeeded by: V. V. Giri

3rd Governor of Andhra Pradesh
- In office 8 September 1962 – 4 May 1964
- Chief Minister: Neelam Sanjiva Reddy; Kasu Brahmananda Reddy
- Preceded by: Bhim Sen Sachar
- Succeeded by: Pattom A. Thanu Pillai

6th Governor of Assam
- In office 13 January 1961 – 7 September 1962
- Chief Minister: Bimala Prasad Chaliha
- Preceded by: Vishnu Sahay
- Succeeded by: Vishnu Sahay
- In office 14 October 1959 – 12 November 1960
- Chief Minister: Bimala Prasad Chaliha
- Preceded by: Chandreswar Prasad Sinha
- Succeeded by: Vishnu Sahay

2nd Chief of the Army Staff
- In office 15 May 1955 – 7 May 1957
- President: Rajendra Prasad
- Prime Minister: Jawaharlal Nehru
- Preceded by: General Rajendrasinhji Jadeja
- Succeeded by: General Kodendera Subayya Thimayya

Personal details
- Born: 11 May 1903 Kolhapur, Kolhapur State, British Raj (now in Maharashtra, India)
- Died: 27 December 1977 (aged 74) New Delhi, India
- Spouse: Rajkumari Kochhar
- Children: 5
- Military career
- Allegiance: British India; India
- Branch: British Indian Army; Indian Army
- Service years: 30 August 1923 – 7 May 1957
- Rank: General
- Service number: IA-417
- Unit: 19th Hyderabad Regiment (presently Kumaon Regiment)
- Commands: Chief of Army Staff; Southern Army; Western Army; GOC Madras Area; V Corps (later XV Corps); Lushai Brigade (Burma); 64th Indian Infantry Brigade; 6/19 Hyderabad (now 6 Kumaon)

General Satyawant Mallanna Shrinagesh (also known as Satyavant Shrinagule Mallannah) (11 May 1903 – 27 December 1977) was an Indian military officer who served as 2nd Chief of Army Staff of the Indian Army from 14 May 1955 till 7 May 1957. After retirement he served as the governor of Assam from 14 October 1959 to 12 November 1960 and again from 13 January 1961 to 7 September 1962. He was the governor of Andhra Pradesh from 8 September 1962 to 4 May 1964 and governor of Mysore from 4 May 1964 to 2 April 1965. He also served as principal of the Administrative Staff College of India in Hyderabad, Hyderabad State from 1957 to 1959.

== Early life and education ==
Shrinagesh was born in Kolhapur, Maharashtra, the eldest son of Dr. Shrinagesh Mallannah, into an ethnic Kannadiga Lingayat family influenced by Brahma Samaj. His father was the personal physician to H.E.H. Mir Sir Osman Ali Khan Asaf Jah VII, the Nizam of Hyderabad. His mother was Ahalyabai, daughter of Krishnaji Kelavkar. Born in 1903 at Kolhapur, Maharashtra he went to West Buckland School in England and entered the University of Cambridge in 1921.

He was among the earliest batches of Indians to be nominated for the Royal Military College, Sandhurst, in England. He won the Quetta Cup for the best man at arms entering the Indian Army in 1923.

== Military career up to 1939 ==
From Sandhurst he was subsequently commissioned a second lieutenant on the Unattached List for the Indian Army on 29 August 1923. After the mandatory one year attachment to a British regiment in India, in his case the 1st Battalion of the North Staffordshire Regiment, he was admitted to the Indian Army and posted to the 2nd Battalion of the 1st Madras Pioneers (erstwhile 64th Pioneers) on 14 October 1924, with which he served mostly in Burma until it was disbanded. In 1933, he joined the 4th battalion 19th Hyderabad Regiment and served in Singapore as its adjutant from December 1935 to December 1939. In December 1939, he was posted as an instructor at the Indian Military Academy, Dehra Dun.

== Later career ==
During the Second World War, from 17 December 1942 till 28 August 1945, Shrinagesh was the commanding officer of the 6/19th Hyderabad Regiment (now 6th Kumaon). He then officiated as the brigade commander of the 64th Indian Infantry Brigade of the 19th Indian (Dagger) Division in Burma from August 1945. He was selected to go to Germany as deputy chief of the Indian Military Mission in November 1945. In that capacity, he also worked as the economic adviser and consul looking after the interests of Indian nationals in Germany and locating missing Prisoners of War (POWs).

He was then appointed the first Indian commandant of the Kumaon Regimental Centre in Agra on 2 October 1946 and served in that capacity till 12 December 1946. He was then chosen to lead the 268th Infantry Brigade British Commonwealth Occupation Force (BCOF) in post World War II Japan and served in that post till 1947. He was also brigade commander of the famous Lushai Brigade in Burma in 1947.

On his return from Japan, he was promoted to acting major-general on 15 September 1947 and was appointed the general officer commanding of the Madras Area. From January 1948, he was appointed the adjutant general at the Army Headquarters and held that post till August of the same year. Promoted to acting lieutenant-general, he also commanded the 5th Corps (later designated as 15th Corps). He was appointed the overall commander of all troops in Jammu & Kashmir during the 1947–48 Indo-Pak War and held this command till the ceasefire on 1 January 1949. He was chosen as the GOC-in-C Western Command on 15 January 1949 and promoted to the substantive rank of lieutenant general in 1950. He was then appointed the GOC-in-C Southern Command and held that post, till he assumed charge as the Army Chief on 14 May 1955. He was decorated with the U.S. Legion of Merit in September 1955.

General Shrinagesh retired on 7 May 1957, completing 34 years of distinguished military service. Post retirement, he served as the governor of Assam from 1959 to 1962, then as the governor of Andhra Pradesh from 1962 to 1964 and finally as Governor of Mysore (now Karnataka) from 1964 to 1965. From 1957 to 1959, he also served as the principal of the Administrative Staff College in Hyderabad.

== Personal life ==
In 1934, Shrinagesh married Rajkumari Kochhar (14 April 1915—24 January 2017), with whom he had three sons and two daughters. One son, Satish, also joined the Indian Army, retiring as a major.

Diagnosed with Parkinson's disease in the late 1950s, Shrinagesh succumbed to the disease in the morning of 27 December 1977 at the Army Hospital Delhi Cantonment. Survived by his wife and children, he was cremated with full military honours in New Delhi the following day, with his funeral attended by senior military officers including the Chief of the Army Staff Tapishwar Narain Raina.

== Awards and decorations ==

General Service Medal 1947	Indian Independence Medal		1939–1945 Star
Burma Star	War Medal 1939–1945	India Service Medal	Legion of Merit (Commander)

== Dates of rank ==
Insignia	Rank	Component	Date of rank
	Second Lieutenant	British Indian Army	29 August 1923
	Lieutenant	British Indian Army	30 November 1925
	Captain	British Indian Army	30 August 1932
	Major	British Indian Army	30 August 1940
	Lieutenant-Colonel	British Indian Army	December 1942 (acting); 27 March 1943 (temporary)
	Colonel	British Indian Army	November 1945 (acting)
	Brigadier	British Indian Army	December 1946 (acting)
	Major	Indian Army	15 August 1947 (Note: Upon independence in 1947, India became a Dominion within the British Commonwealth of Nations. As a result, the rank insignia of the British Army, incorporating the Tudor Crown and four-pointed Bath Star ("pip"), was retained, as George VI remained Commander-in-Chief of the Indian Armed Forces. After 26 January 1950, when India became a republic, the President of India became Commander-in-Chief, and the Ashoka Lion replaced the crown, with a five-pointed star being substituted for the "pip.")
	Major-General	Indian Army	15 September 1947 (acting)
	Lieutenant-General	Indian Army	1948 (acting)
	Lieutenant-Colonel	Indian Army	30 August 1949
	Lieutenant-General	Indian Army	26 January 1950 (recommissioning and change in insignia)
	General (COAS)	Indian Army	14 May 1955

== Notes ==
Military offices
Preceded by K. M. Cariappa	General Officer Commanding-in-Chief Western Command; 1949-1953	Succeeded by K. S. Thimayya
Preceded by Kumar Shri Rajendrasinhji	General Officer Commanding-in-Chief Southern Command; 1953-1955	Succeeded by K. S. Thimayya
Preceded by Kumar Shri Rajendrasinhji	Chief of the Army Staff; 1955-1957	Succeeded by K. S. Thimayya
Government offices
Preceded by Chandreswar Prasad Sinha	Governor of Assam; 1959–1960	Succeeded by Vishnu Sahay
Preceded by Vishnu Sahay	Governor of Assam; 1961–1962	Succeeded by Vishnu Sahay
Preceded by Bhim Sen Sachar	Governor of Andhra Pradesh; 1962–1964	Succeeded by Pattom A. Thanu Pillai
Preceded by Jayachamaraja Wodeyar Bahadur	Governor of Mysore; 1964–1965	Succeeded by V. V. Giri
