= Mehdi Nawaz Jung =

Indian politician (1894–1967)

Nawab Mehdi Nawaz Jung
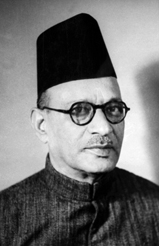
- Born: Syed Mohammed Mehdi; 23 May 1894; Dar-ul-Shifa, Hyderabad, Hyderabad State (now Telangana, India)
- Died: 28 June 1967 (aged 73); Hyderabad, Andhra Pradesh, India (now Telangana, India)
- Other names: Baba Mian
- Occupations: Bureaucrat and Politician
- Known for: Social Work, Cooperative Movement & Health Concerns.
- Awards: Padma Vibhushan

1st Governor of Gujarat
- In office 1 May 1960 – 1 August 1965
- Chief Minister: Jivraj Narayan Mehta; Balwantrai Mehta
- Preceded by: Office Established
- Succeeded by: Nityanand Kanungo

Vice Chancellor of Osmania University
- In office 1936–1943

Nawab Mehdi Nawaz Jung (23 May 1894 – 28 June 1967) was an Indian bureaucrat and was Secretary to the Executive Council during the Nizam rule. He also served as the Governor of Gujarat from 1960 to 1965.

His house known as Banjara Bhavan, located at Banjara Hills was a very picturesque area of Hyderabad which was promoted by Mehdi Nawaz Jung for habitation, is a Grade-I notified heritage building by Hyderabad Metropolitan Development Authority.

== Early life ==
Mehdi Nawaz Jung was born in Darulshifa, Hyderabad Deccan in a middle-class family of a very religious father Moulvi Syed Abbas Ali (Abbas Sahab).

== Career ==
Mehdi Nawaz Jung was also the first commissioner of Municipal Corporation of Hyderabad. He contested a general election in 1952 from the Hyderabad constituency and won the election with a very big majority. From the year 1952 to January 1960, Shri Mehdi Nawaz Jung was a Minister in the former Hyderabad State and then in Andhra Pradesh Government, holding various portfolios such as Public Works Department, Roads & Buildings Department, Irrigation & Power, etc.

He was the first President of Indian Council of Social Welfare. He was instrumental in setting up Niloufer Hospital and Mehdi Nawaz Jung Institute of Oncology - the first government cancer hospital of its sort in India. One of the pioneers in using Radio-Iodine ablation in thyroid cancers. It is one of the regional cancer centres, presently approved and funded by the central government. An astute administrator like his fellow Chief Minister of Gujarat Dr.Jivraj Mehta during his Governorship in Gujarat circa 1960. He was the Secretary, Executive Council, Hyderabad State 1926, First Municipal Commissioner & Master of Surgery, Minister in the governments of Hyderabad and Andhra Pradesh 1952 to 1959. He was a member of the 1956 committee for Standards for Education & Practice of Hakims, Vaidyas, Homeopaths.

== Personal life ==
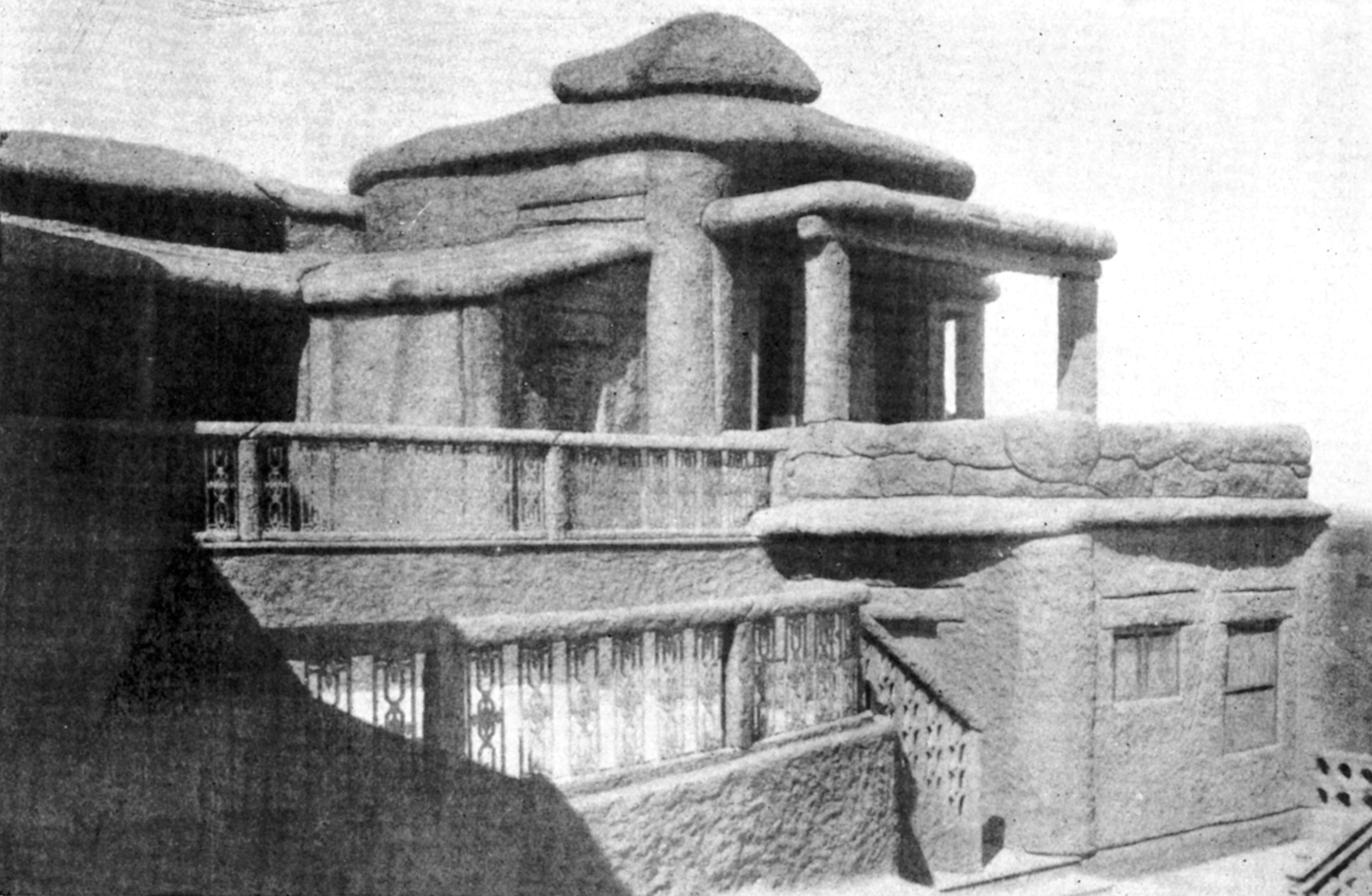
Kohistan, the residence of Mehdi Nawaz Jung

Nawab Mehdi Nawaz Jung was married to Tahira Begum, daughter of Nawab Aqeel Jung and had four sons.

== Positions held ==
- Secretary, Executive Council - Hyderabad State 1926
- First Municipal Commissioner - MCH
- Member of the Assemblies of Hyderabad and Andhra Pradesh 1952 to 1959
- Minister in the governments of Hyderabad and Andhra Pradesh 1952 to 1959
- Governor of Gujarat - 1960

He established an auditorium hall for the community in the center of Ahmedabad (Gujarat) and the land for that was given by Nanavati family and in the early stage of Gujarat after getting separate statehood many NGO's have been working for the better of the society. The auditorium was named after him: Mehdi Nawaj Jung hall in Paldi area.

== Legacy ==
The locality Mehdipatnam in Hyderabad is named after him.
