= Ajudhiya Nath Khosla =

Indian politician (1892–1984)

Ajudhia Nath Khosla

7th Governor of Odisha
- In office 16 September 1962 – 5 August 1966
- Preceded by: Yeshwant Narayan Sukthankar
- Succeeded by: Khaleell Ahommed
- In office 12 September 1966 – 30 January 1968
- Preceded by: Khaleell Ahommed
- Succeeded by: Shaukatullah Shah Ansari

Member of Parliament, Rajya Sabha (Nominated)
- In office 3 April 1958 – 2 April 1964

Personal details
- Born: 11 December 1892 New Delhi
- Died: 1984 (aged 91–92)
- Awards: Padma Bhushan (1954) Padma Vibhushan (1977)
- Monuments: Khosla International House at IIT Roorkee; A.N.Khosla Hall of Residence at IIT Bhubaneshwar
- Education: BA, 1912; CE, 1916, IIT Roorkee
- Alma mater: IIT Roorkee (then Thomason College of Civil Engineering)
- Occupations: engineer, educationist and social activist
- Awards: Padma Bhushan, 1954; Shanti Swarup Bhatnagar Prize, 1974; Padma Vibhushan, 1977

Ajudhia Nath Khosla (11 December 1892 – 1984) was an Indian engineer and politician. He was the Founding Chairman of Central Water Commission, formerly called the Central Waterways Irrigation and Navigation Commission of India.

Khosla was born in Jalandhar, and worked as Vice Chancellor of the University of Roorkee from 1954 to 1959. He was awarded the Padma Bhushan in 1954 and the Padma Vibhushan in 1977. He was nominated as member of the Rajya Sabha, the upper house of the Indian Parliament in 1958, but resigned in 1959 and joined the Planning Commission. He was the Governor of Odisha from September 1962 to August 1966 and again from September 1966 to January 1968. He was the president of Indian National Science Academy from 1961-62.

== Education ==
Born in Jalandhar district of Punjab, he took up his early education there. After passing the matriculation in 1908 he took his BA with honours from D.A.V. College, Lahore, in 1912. He then joined the Thomason College of Civil Engineering (now IIT Roorkee) in 1913 and passed out in 1916 as a civil engineer.

== Career ==
After graduating in 1916, he started his career with the Irrigation Branch of the Punjab Public Works Department. In few years, the Indian Service of Engineers (ISE) was established (1919) and he was allotted his first assignment (September 1917– March 1921) for surveys and investigations of Bhakra Dam Project. During this period, he spent 18 months on deputation to Mesopotamia as a commissioned officer with the Indian Expeditionary Force. While serving there (1918–1920) he developed the Khosla Disc for precision levelling across rivers and wide valleys. From 1921 to 1926 he was involved in the construction of the Suleimanke Barrage.

In 1931 Khosla was deputed to the US and Europe to study soil reclamation, water logging and the latest techniques in dam design. On his return he was posted to the Panjnad Head Works of Sutlej Valley Canals. Between June and September 1936 while in charge of the Hafizabad Division, he wrote his magnum opus, The design of weirs on permeable foundation. This publication revolutionised the design of such structures in India and abroad.

It not only lucidly presents the theoretical aspects of seepage flow but also provides a complete, simple and reliable method for design of weirs.

== Contributions ==
=== As an engineer ===
He applied his methods to the design of the Trimmu Barrage and constructed it within two years (1937–1939), against the normal period of 4–5 years. He served as superintending engineer in 1939 and chief engineer in 1943 and in both capacities, cherished Bhakra project. He was appointed the first chairman of the newly constituted Central Waterways, Irrigation and Navigation Commission in 1945. He developed the Poona Research Station at Khadakvasla into Central Water and Power Station. He undertook planning, design and, as in Hirakud Dam, construction of major Water Resources Projects. He served as vice-chairman and later chairman of the board of Consultants of Bhakra Control Board until its commissioning in 1963. He was instrumental in bringing about a number of agreements on negotiations for Indus Water Dispute with Pakistan.

=== As an educationist ===
He was appointed the first Indian Vice-Chancellor of Thomason College of Civil Engineering (later renamed University of Roorkee and then IIT Roorkee). He was the founder of two specialised engineering departments, which have made the University internationally known: the Water Resources Development Training Centre and the School of Research and Training in Earthquake Engineering. He was the founder of Adarsh Bal Niketan, Roorkee.

=== In the Government ===
He was invited by the then Indian Prime Minister to serve as a member of the Planning Commission in 1959. He served as the Chairman of the Education Panel of the Planning Commission He was appointed the Governor of Orissa in 1962, the first professional engineer to be given such a responsibility.

== Recognition ==
- Padma Vibhushan, 1977
- Shanti Swarup Bhatnagar Prize, 1974
- Padma Bhusan, 1954
- Conferred the honorary D.Sc. degree by his alma mater

== See also ==
- Palle Rama Rao

Government offices
Preceded by Yeshwant Narayan Sukthankar	Governor of Odisha; 16 September 1962 to 5 August 1966 (1st term)	Succeeded by Khaleell Ahommed
Preceded by Khaleell Ahommed	Governor of Odisha; 12 September 1966 to 30 January 1968 (2nd term)	Succeeded by Shaukatullah Shah Ansari
