= Burgula Ramakrishna Rao =

Chief Minister of Hyderabad State (1899–1967)

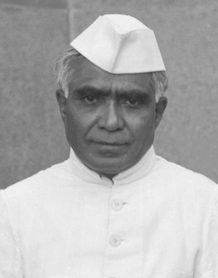
- Rao in 1952

12th Governor of Uttar Pradesh
- In office 1 July 1960 – 15 April 1962
- Chief Minister: Sampurnanand; Chandra Bhanu Gupta
- Preceded by: V. V. Giri
- Succeeded by: Bishwanath Das

1st Governor of Kerala
- In office 22 November 1956 – 1 July 1960
- Chief Minister: E. M. S. Namboodiripad; Pattom Thanu Pillai
- Preceded by: P. S. Rao acting
- Succeeded by: V. V. Giri

2nd Chief Minister of Hyderabad
- In office 6 March 1952 – 31 October 1956
- Governor: Mir Osman Ali Khan
- Preceded by: M. K. Vellodi
- Succeeded by: Office Abolished (Neelam Sanjiva Reddy as Chief Minister of United Andhra Pradesh)

Personal details
- Born: Pullamraju Ramakrishnarao; 13 March 1899 Padakallu Village, Kalwakurthy, Hyderabad State
- Died: 15 September 1967 (aged 68)

Burgula Ramakrishna Rao (13 March 1899 – 15 September 1967) was the 2nd and last Chief Minister of the erstwhile Hyderabad State. Prior to the independence of India and the political integration of the princely states into the Union, he was among the Telugu-speaking leaders to resist the Nizam in the princely state of Hyderabad. He was a multilingual academic, known for his scholarship in Sanskrit and Telugu. He was also a poet and translator.

== Career ==
He received famous "Allies" scholarship and graduated in law in Mumbai and took up the legal profession in Hyderabad but continued for a few days only. He was imprisoned twice for participating in public movements. He gave up the law portfolio given by Mirza Ismail, the Dewan (Prime Minister) of Hyderabad State.

He was one of the founding members of the Hyderabad State Congress. He presided over the second Andhra Mahasabha conference at Devarkonda in 1932 and gave direction for Telangana society. He also worked as a secretary for Hyderabad Swadesi League and Nizam Subjects League. He was also involved in promoting the library movement in the State.

He worked as a Revenue Minister in the cabinet of Vellodi government (1950) which was formed after police action. He got victory from Shadnagar constituency in the first sovereign elections held in 1952, and became the first Chief Minister of Hyderabad. After the termination of Nizam rule, in a short period he formed a stable democratic system with his administrative skill. He eradicated the system of jagirdar and mukthedar in Telangana and introduced the law of tenancy and became the first Indian land reformer.

The services of Burgula spread not only in Telangana but also to neighbouring areas. After the formation of Andhra Pradesh in 1956, as a Governor of Kerala state, he showed his statesmanship and got acclaim from many top politicians. When he was Governor of Uttar Pradesh, he was elected as a member of Rajya Sabha in 1962 to 1966.

From November 1956 to July 1960, Ramakrishna Rao was the Governor of Kerala, and in July 1959 he dismissed the first elected Communist govt. in India, the first time article 356 was used in India. Later he was Governor of Uttar Pradesh till April 1962. He was later elected to the Rajya Sabha in which he served from 1962 to 1966. He died on 14 September 1967.

== Personal life ==
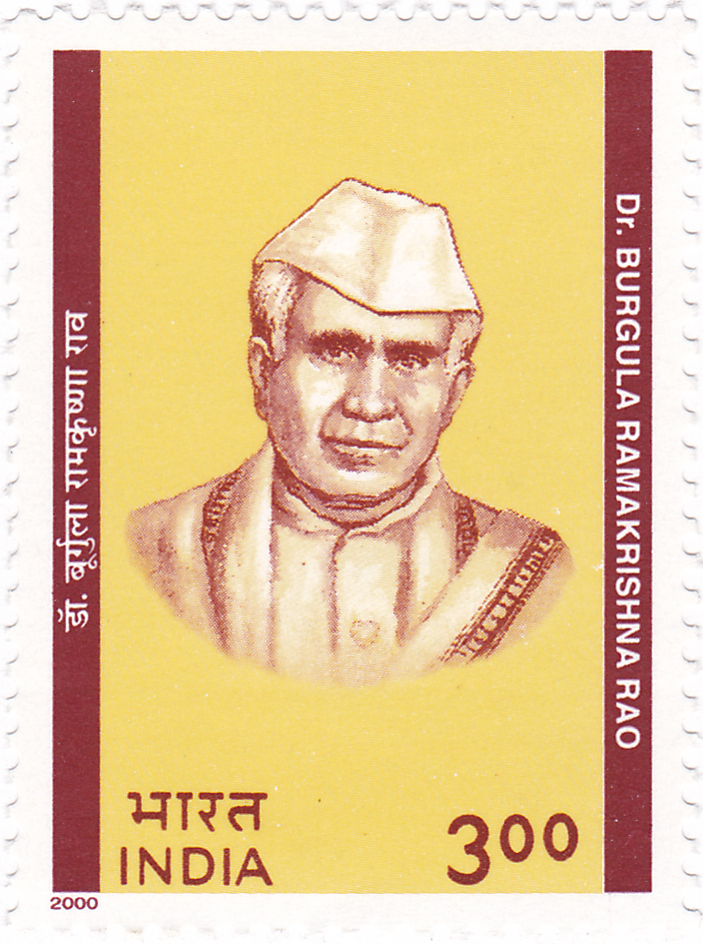
Burgula Ramakrishna Rao 2000 stamp of India

Burgula Ramakrishna Rao was married firstly to Radha Bai and later to Ananthalakshmi Devi and is survived by his son, Burgula Lakshmi Narayana Rao. His parents were Sri Narsing Rao and Mrs. Ranganayakamma and his younger brother was the late Sri Venkateshwara Rao.

== See also ==
- 1951–52 elections in India
- List of chief ministers of Andhra Pradesh
- List of chief ministers of Telangana
