= Sri Prakasa =

Indian politician

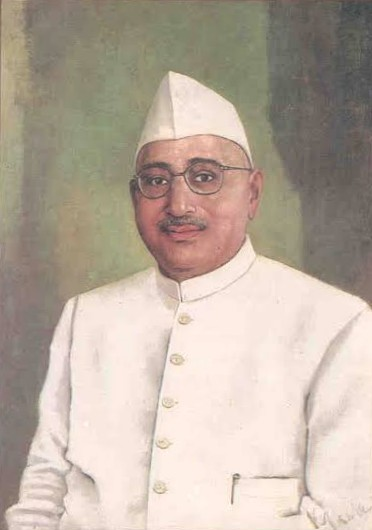

Governor of Bombay (Maharashtra from 1960)
- In office 10 December 1956 – 16 April 1962
- Chief Minister: Yashwantrao Chavan
- Preceded by: Harekrushna Mahatab
- Succeeded by: P. Subbarayan

Governor of Madras
- In office 12 March 1952 – 10 December 1956
- Chief Minister: P. S. Kumaraswamy Raja; C. Rajagopalachari; K. Kamaraj
- Preceded by: Krishna Kumarsinhji Bhavsinhji
- Succeeded by: A. J. John

Governor of Assam
- In office 16 February 1949 – 27 May 1950
- Chief Minister: Gopinath Bordoloi
- Preceded by: Ronald Francis Lodge (Acting)
- Succeeded by: Jairamdas Daulatram

1st Indian High Commissioner to Pakistan
- In office 1947–1949
- Prime Minister: Jawaharlal Nehru
- Preceded by: Office Established
- Succeeded by: Sita Ram

Personal details
- Born: 3 August 1890 Varanasi, United Provinces, British India
- Died: 23 June 1971 (aged 80)
- Education: Central Hindu Boys School; University of Cambridge
- Awards: Padma Vibhushan

Sri Prakasa (3 August 1890 – 23 June 1971) was an Indian politician, freedom-fighter and administrator. He served as India's first High Commissioner to Pakistan from 1947 to 1949, Governor of Assam from 1949 to 1950, Governor of Madras from 1952 to 1956 and Governor of Bombay from 1956 to 1962.

Sri Prakasa was born in Varanasi in 1890. In his early days, he participated in the Indian independence movement and was jailed. After India's independence, he served as an administrator and cabinet minister. Sri Prakasa died in 1971 at the age of 80.

== Early life ==
Sri Prakasa was born on 3 August 1890 in Varanasi to Bhagwan Das. He had his schooling at Central Hindu Boys' School C.H.B.S. (B.H.U.) Varanasi and graduated from Cambridge.

== Indian independence movement ==
Prakasa was arrested during the Quit India Movement and was in jail from 1942 to 1944.

== High Commissioner to Pakistan ==
In August 1947, Sri Prakasa was appointed India's first High Commissioner to Pakistan and served in the post till 1949. During this time, Pakistan was gripped by communal riots and Sri Prakasa had to deal with the influx of refugees to India and the granting of Indian citizenship to migrants. Sri Prakasa had also to represent India's diplomatic interests during Pakistan's invasion of Kashmir.

== Governor of Assam ==
Sri Prakasa served as the governor of Assam from 16 February 1949 to 27 May 1949. When Prakasa took over as governor, there were serious disturbances in the eastern parts of the province which were inhabited by the Mizo Hill tribes. The Governor pacified the agitators by promising to grant sufficient autonomy. As a result, a Lushai Hills Advisory Council was set up. During his short tenure, he secured the accession of Manipur.

== Governor of Madras ==
Sri Prakasa was elected to Lok Sabha from Prayagraj in 1952 but was quite soon appointed the Governor of Madras. He served as the governor of Madras from 1952 to 1956. While governor, he took the highly criticized decision to invite C. Rajagopalachari to form a Congress government in the state despite the fact that the Indian National Congress did not have a majority and Rajagopalachari was not an elected member of the assembly as he had not participated in the elections. Rajagopalachari requested Prakasa to nominate him to the assembly thereby forgoing the usual process of election by the members of the assembly. However, Rajagopalachari resigned in two years because of strong opposition to his leadership among party ranks. P.C. Alexander, a former Tamil Nadu and Maharashtra governor, viewed the behaviour of the governor and the chief minister of Madras in 1952 as one of the most serious breaches of the democratic process.

== Governor of Bombay ==
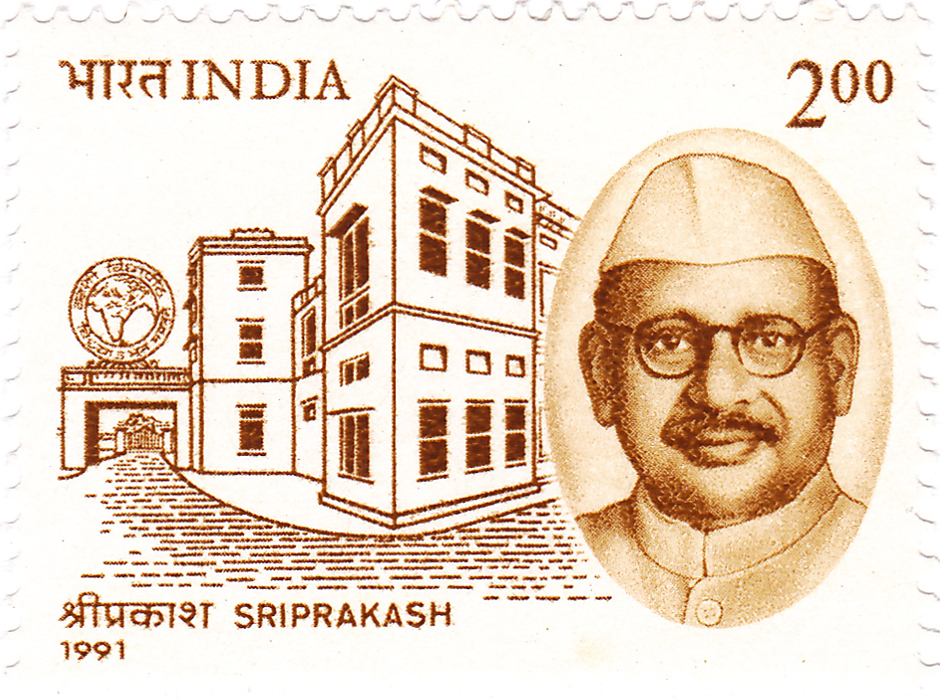
Sri Prakasa 1991 stamp of India

Sri Prakasa served as the governor of Bombay.

== Notes ==
Government offices
Preceded by Ronald Francis Lodge (acting)	Governor of Assam; 16 February 1949 – 27 March 1950	Succeeded by Jairam Das Daulatram
Preceded by M. C. Chagla	Governor of Bombay; 10 December 1956 – 16 April 1962	Succeeded by P. Subbarayan
