= Vishnu Sahay =

Indian politician (1901–1989)

Governor of Assam
- In office 7 September 1962 – 17 April 1968
- President: Sarvepalli Radhakrishnan; Zakir Husain
- Chief Minister: Bimala Prasad Chaliha
- Preceded by: S. M. Shrinagesh
- Succeeded by: Braj Kumar Nehru
- In office 12 November 1960 – 13 January 1961
- President: Rajendra Prasad
- Chief Minister: Bimala Prasad Chaliha
- Preceded by: S. M. Shrinagesh
- Succeeded by: S. M. Shrinagesh

Governor of Nagaland
- In office 1 December 1963 – 16 April 1968
- President: Sarvepalli Radhakrishnan; Zakir Husain
- Chief Minister: P. Shilu Ao; Thepfülo-u Nakhro
- Preceded by: Position created
- Succeeded by: Braj Kumar Nehru

Cabinet Secretary of India
- In office 1 July 1958 – 10 November 1960
- Prime Minister: Jawaharlal Nehru
- Preceded by: M. K. Vellodi
- Succeeded by: B. N. Jha
- In office 9 March 1961 – 15 April 1962
- Prime Minister: Jawaharlal Nehru
- Preceded by: B. N. Jha
- Succeeded by: S. S. Khera

Personal details
- Born: 22 November 1901
- Died: 3 April 1989 (aged 87)
- Relations: Bhagwan Sahay (brother)

Vishnu Sahay (22 November 1901 – 3 April 1989) was a former ICS officer and Cabinet Secretary of India who served as Governor of Assam and Nagaland following his retirement.

== Early life and education ==
Sahay was the elder brother of Bhagawan Sahay, also an ICS officer and a former Governor of Kerala and Himachal Pradesh. Vishnu Sahay studied at the SM College, Chandausi and at the Oxford University. He was a member of the 1925 batch of the ICS, passing the exams on 16 October of that year. Somewhat unusually, he was never awarded any of the honours which a civilian of his long service would have normally received.

== Civil servant ==
Sahay had a long and distinguished career in the Indian Civil Service. He served as Cane Commissioner of Uttar Pradesh and Sugar Controller for India, and as Secretary of Agriculture to the Government of India in which post, impressed by the Kaira Cooperative, he helped Verghese Kurien of Amul get a scholarship to study dairying in New Zealand. He also served as Secretary for Kashmir Affairs in the Ministry of External Affairs and was Cabinet Secretary of India twice during 1958–1960 and during 1961–1962.

== Gubernatorial tenure ==
Sahay was a two time Governor of Assam serving from 12 November 1960 to 13 January 1961 and from 7 September 1962 to 17 April 1968. As Governor of Assam, Sahay signed the Ceasefire Agreement with the Naga insurgents in 1964. He was also the first Governor of Nagaland, holding that office from 1 December 1963 – 17 April 1968.
