= Gurmukh Nihal Singh =

Indian politician (1895–1969)

Sardar Gurmukh Nihal Singh
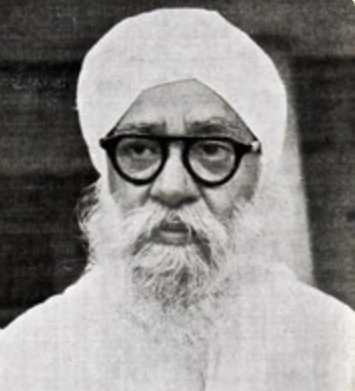

1st Governor of Rajasthan
- In office 1 November 1956 – 16 April 1962
- Preceded by: Man Singh II (Rajpramukh)
- Succeeded by: Sampurnanand

2nd Chief Minister of Delhi
- In office 13 February 1955 – 31 October 1956
- Preceded by: Chaudhary Brahm Prakash
- Succeeded by: Position Abolished (Note: As after that States Reorganisation Act, 1956 was passed which made Delhi a Union Territory. Thus, no one was appointed the next CM of Delhi until legislative assembly elections in Delhi were held in 1993, (succeeded by Madan Lal Khurana) when Union Territory of Delhi was formally declared as National Capital Territory of Delhi by the Sixty-ninth Amendment to the Indian constitution and formed Delhi Metropolitan Council.)

Personal details
- Born: 14 March 1895
- Died: 22 December 1969 (aged 74)
- Party: Indian National Congress
- Education: Banaras Hindu University, University of Delhi

Gurmukh Nihal Singh (14 March 1895 – 22 December 1969) was the first Governor of Rajasthan and second Chief Minister of Delhi from 1955 to 1956 and was a Congress leader. He was the successor of Brahm Prakash and assumed office in 1955 just for one year. The noted journalist and editor of The Statesman, Surendra Nihal Singh (1929-2018) was Gurmukh Nihal Singh's son.
