= Bhim Sen Sachar =

Indian politician

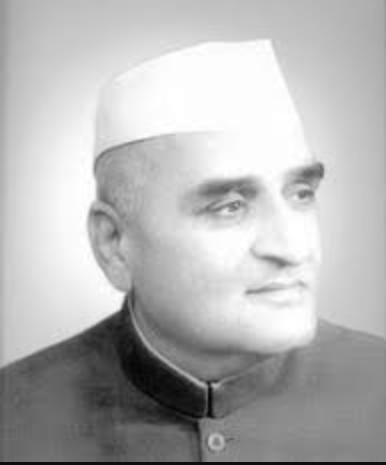

2nd Chief Minister of Punjab
- In office 13 April 1949 – 18 October 1949
- Preceded by: Gopi Chand Bhargava
- Succeeded by: Gopi Chand Bhargava
- In office 17 April 1952 – 23 January 1956
- Preceded by: President's rule
- Succeeded by: Partap Singh Kairon

Leader of Opposition in Punjab Assembly
- In office 1942–1945
- Preceded by: Sardar Sampuran Singh
- Succeeded by: Iftikhar Hussain Khan Mamdot

5th Governor of Odisha
- In office 12 September 1956 – 31 July 1957
- Preceded by: P. S. Kumaraswamy Raja
- Succeeded by: Y. N. Sukthankar

2nd Governor of Andhra Pradesh
- In office 1957–1962
- Preceded by: Chandulal Madhavlal Trivedi
- Succeeded by: S. M. Shrinagesh

Personal details
- Born: 1 December 1894 Peshawar, Punjab, British India (now in Khyber Pakhtunkhwa, Pakistan)
- Died: 18 January 1978 (aged 83)
- Citizenship: British India (1894–1947); Pakistan (1947–1949); India (1949–1978)
- Party: Indian National Congress
- Profession: Politician

Bhim Sen Sachar (1 December 1894 – 18 January 1978) was an Indian politician who served three times as the Chief Minister of Punjab.

== Early life ==
Sachar was born on 1 December 1894. He did BA and LLB in Lahore and practiced law in Gujranwala, which is now in Pakistan. He was attracted to the freedom movement and joined the Indian National Congress party at a young age. In 1921, he was elected as the Secretary of Punjab Pradesh Congress Committee. By the time India gained independence in 1947, he was an important member of the party.

== Years in Pakistan ==
Around the time of Independence, Sachar accepted citizenship of Pakistan and became a member of the First Pakistan Constituent Assembly. He later relinquished the Pakistan citizenship and returned to India.

== Back in India ==
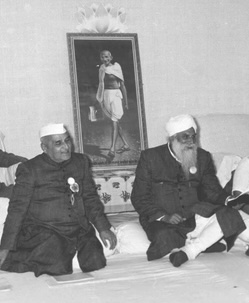
Former Chief Minister of Punjab Bhim Sen Sachar (Left) and Partap Singh Kairon (Right) attending Congress working committee meeting in Amrirsar on 8 February 1956.

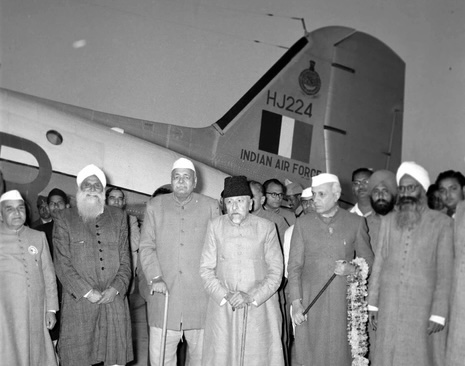
(Left to Right) Bhim Sen Sachar, Giani Gurmukh Singh Musaffir, Govind Ballabh Pant, Maulana Abul Kalam Azaad, Jawahar Lal Nehru and Pratap Singh Kairon at Amritsar Airport on 6 February 1956.

In 1949, the Congress selected him for the office of Chief Minister of Punjab. He took oath on 13 April 1949 and served until 18 October 1949. However, bitter factional politics in the state party unit between Gopi Chand Bhargava and Sachar led to the first ever imposition of President's rule in any state in India under Article 365 of the Constitution of India.

The first elections in independent India were held in 1952 and the Punjab legislative assembly was formed for the first time that year. The Congress party won the provincial elections at this time, and Sachar became chief minister again, serving from 17 April 1952 to 23 January 1956.

Bhim Sen Sachar was the father-in-law of famous journalist and former Indian Ambassador to the UK Kuldip Nayar.

After he demitted office (due to internal party politics), Sachar was named governor of Odisha by the union government. He served from 1956 to 1957. He was then named governor of Andhra Pradesh and served from 1957 to 1962.

During the Emergency, he was arrested and sent to jail with some other dissident leaders of Congress party, who belonged to the "old school" of the party and had spoken against the increasing authoritarianism of Indira Gandhi and her son Sanjay.

== Personal life ==
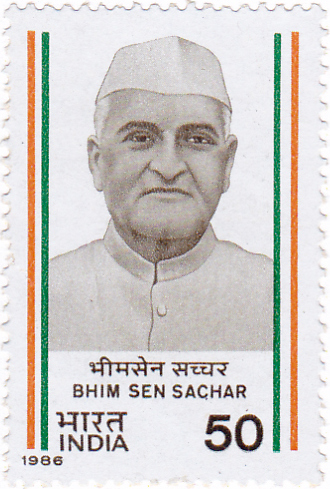
An Indian Postage Stamp Depicting him, 1986

Sachar was married at an early age to a girl of his own community, in a match arranged by parents. His son, Rajinder Sachar (b. 1923) was a lawyer and judge who served as Chief Justice of the Delhi High Court, and was famously the Chairman of the Sachar Committee which produced a report on the status of religious minorities in India. Another son, Capt. Vijay Sachar of the Indian Army, was killed in action in Gaza, where he was serving in the Indian contingent of the UNEF. Veteran Indian journalist, left-wing activist and peace activist Kuldip Nayar was Sachar's son-in-law.

Government offices
Preceded by C.M. Trivedi	Governor of Andhra Pradesh; 1957–196	Succeeded by S.M. Shrinagesh
