= Hari Vinayak Pataskar =

Indian lawyer and politician

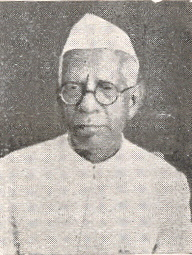

2nd Governor of Madhya Pradesh
- In office 14 June 1957 – 10 February 1965
- Chief Minister: Kailash Nath Katju; Bhagwantrao Mandloi; Dwarka Prasad Mishra
- Preceded by: Pattabhi Sitaramayya
- Succeeded by: K.C. Reddy

Minister of Civil Aviation
- In office 7 December 1956 – 16 April 1957
- Prime Minister: Jawaharlal Nehru
- Preceded by: Lal Bahadur Shastri
- Succeeded by: Lal Bahadur Shastri

Member of the Constituent Assembly of India
- In office 9 December 1946 – 24 January 1950

Personal details
- Born: 15 May 1892 Indapur, Pune, Bombay Presidency, British India (Now in Maharashtra, India)
- Died: 21 February 1970 (aged 77) Pune, Maharashtra, India
- Party: Indian National Congress
- Awards: Padma Vibhushan (1963)

Hari Vinayak Pataskar was an Indian lawyer, former Vice-Chancellor of the University of Poona and politician who was a member of the Constituent Assembly of India and a former Governor of Madhya Pradesh. He was the longest-serving governor of Madhya Pradesh, with a tenure of 7 years, 8 months and 10 days. In 1963, he was awarded the Padma Vibhushan, the second highest civilian honour in India, for services in Public Affairs.
