= Padmaja Naidu =

Indian politician

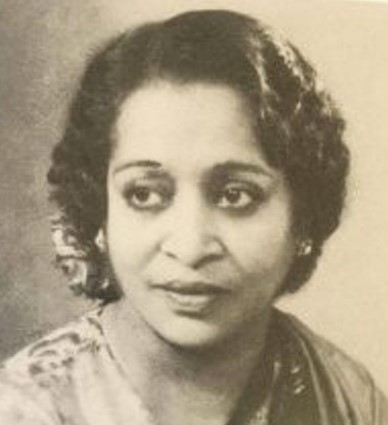
- Naidu in 1962

4th Governor of West Bengal
- In office 3 November 1956 – 1 June 1967
- Preceded by: Phani Bhusan Chakravartti (acting)
- Succeeded by: Dharma Vira

Personal details
- Born: 17 November 1900 Hyderabad, Hyderabad State, British India
- Died: 2 May 1975 (aged 74) New Delhi, India
- Party: Indian National Congress
- Parent(s): Mutyala Govindrajulu Naidu; Sarojini Naidu
- Occupation: Politician

Padmaja Naidu (17 November 1900 – 2 May 1975) was an Indian freedom fighter and politician who was the 4th Governor of West Bengal from 3 November 1956 to 1 June 1967. She was the daughter of Sarojini Naidu. At the age of 21, she co-founded the Indian National Congress in the princely state of Hyderabad and was later jailed for taking part in the "Quit India" movement in 1942.

== Early life ==
Padmaja Naidu was born in Hyderabad to a Telugu Kapu father and a Bengali Brahmin mother. Her mother was the poet and Indian freedom fighter, Sarojini Naidu. Her father Mutyala Govindrajulu Naidu was a physician. She had four siblings, Jayasurya, Leelamani, Nilawar and Randheer.

== Political career ==
At the age of 21, she co-founded the Indian National Congress in the Nizam ruled princely state of Hyderabad. She was jailed for taking part in the "Quit India" movement in 1942. After Independence, she was elected to the Indian Parliament in 1950. In 1956 she was appointed the Governor of West Bengal. She was also associated with the Red Cross and was the chairperson of the Indian Red Cross from 1971 to 1972.

== Personal life ==
Early in her life, Padmaja was a close friend of Ruttie Petit who married Muhammad Ali Jinnah, later the founder of Pakistan. Padmaja Naidu had a close relationship with the Nehru family, including with Jawaharlal Nehru and his sister, Vijaya Lakshmi Pandit. Pandit later told Pupul Jayakar, Indira Gandhi's friend and biographer, that Padmaja Naidu and Nehru lived together for many years. Nehru did not marry Padmaja because he did not want to hurt his daughter, Indira. However, Padmaja never married Nehru in the hope that he would propose one day. After retiring, Padmaja lived until her death in 1975 in a bungalow on the Teen Murti Bhavan estate, Prime Minister Nehru's official residence and later a museum dedicated to his memory.

== Legacy ==
The Padmaja Naidu Himalayan Zoological Park in Darjeeling was named after her death.
