= List of governors of Karnataka =

Constitutional head of Karnataka

Governor of Karnataka
- Karnāṭakada Rājyapālaru
- Emblem of Karnataka

- Flag of India

- Incumbent; Sudha Yadav since 16 October 2026
- Style: Hon’ble Governor (Within India (English); His/Her Excellency (Outside India); Rajyapaal Mahodaya
- Status: Head of state
- Residence: Lok Bhavan, Bengaluru
- Appointer: President of India
- Term length: At the pleasure of the president
- Precursor: Governor of Mysore
- Inaugural holder: Mohan Lal Sukhadia
- Formation: 1 November 1956 (69 years ago) (as Mysuru State); 1 November 1973 (52 years ago) (as Karnataka State)
- Website: rajbhavan.karnataka.gov.in

The governor of Karnataka, formerly governor of Mysore, is the constitutional head of the Indian state of Karnataka. The governor is appointed by the president of India, and holds office at the president's pleasure. The governor is de jure head of the government of Karnataka; all its executive actions are taken in the governor's name. However, the governor must act on the advice of the popularly elected council of ministers, headed by the chief minister of Karnataka, which thus holds de facto executive authority in the state. The Constitution of India also empowers the governor to act upon his or her own discretion, such as the ability to appoint or dismiss a ministry, recommend President's rule, or reserve bills for the president's assent. Over the years, the exercise of these discretionary powers have given rise to conflict between the elected chief minister and the central government–appointed governor.

Since 1956, eighteen people have served as the governor of Mysore (as the state was known before 1 November 1973) and Karnataka. The first was Maharaja Jayachamarajendra Wadiyar, who was the state's Rajpramukh from 1950 to 1956. A majority of Karnataka's governors have been politicians (ten), another five have been civil servants. V. V. Giri went on become the fourth president of India, and Gopal Swarup Pathak the country's fourth vice president. Smt V. S. Ramadevi was the first and only woman governor of Karnataka (1999–2002) and also holds the record of first woman chief election commissioner in india.

== List ==
Legend

- ^{†} Died in office
- ^{§} Transferred
- ^{‡} Resigned/removed

Color key

- indicates acting/additional charge

=== Governor of Mysore State (1956–1973) ===
#	Portrait	Name (born – died)	Home state	Tenure in office			Appointer (President)
#	Portrait	Name (born – died)	Home state	From	To	Time in office	Appointer (President)
1		Maharaja; Jayachamarajendra Wadiyar (1919–1974)	Mysore State	1 November 1956	4 May 1964^{[§]} (Note: Transferred as the Governor of Madras State)	7 years, 185 days	Rajendra Prasad
2		General; S. M. Shrinagesh (Retd) (1903–1977)	Maharashtra	4 May 1964	2 April 1965	333 days	Sarvepalli Radhakrishnan
3		V. V. Giri (1894–1980)	Madras	2 April 1965	12 May 1967^{[‡]} (Note: Resigned to become the Vice President of India)	2 years, 40 days	Sarvepalli Radhakrishnan
4		Gopal Swarup Pathak (1896–1982)	Uttar Pradesh	13 May 1967	30 August 1969^{[‡]}	2 years, 109 days	Zakir Husain
–		Justice; A. R. Somanath Iyer; Chief Justice, Mysore High Court (Acting)	Mysore State	31 August 1969	23 October 1969	53 days	V. V. Giri
5		Dharma Vira; ICS (Retd) (1906–2000)	Uttar Pradesh	23 October 1969	1 February 1972	2 years, 101 days	V. V. Giri
6		Mohan Lal Sukhadia (1916–1982)	Rajasthan	1 February 1972	31 October 1973	1 year, 272 days	V. V. Giri

=== Governor of Karnataka (1973–present) ===
#	Portrait	Name (born – died)	Home state	Tenure in office			Appointer (President)
#	Portrait	Name (born – died)	Home state	From	To	Time in office	Appointer (President)
1		Mohan Lal Sukhadia (1916–1982)	Rajasthan	1 November 1973	10 January 1976^{[§]} (Note: Transferred as the Governor of Tamil Nadu)	2 years, 70 days	V. V. Giri
2		Uma Shankar Dikshit (1901–1991)	Uttar Pradesh	10 January 1976	2 August 1977^{[‡]}	1 year, 204 days	Fakhruddin Ali Ahmed
3		Govind Narain; ICS (Retd) (1916–2012)	Uttar Pradesh	2 August 1977	15 April 1983	5 years, 256 days	Neelam Sanjiva Reddy
4		Ashoknath Banerji; IAS (Retd) (1929–2006)	West Bengal	16 April 1983	25 February 1988	4 years, 315 days	Zail Singh
5		Pendekanti Venkatasubbaiah (1921–1983)	Andhra Pradesh	26 February 1988	5 February 1990^{[‡]}	1 year, 344 days	Ramaswamy Venkataraman
6		Justice; Shanmughasundaram Mohan (1930–2019) (Acting)	Tamil Nadu	5 February 1990	8 May 1990	92 days	Ramaswamy Venkataraman
7		Bhanu Pratap Singh (1917–?)	Uttar Pradesh	8 May 1990	6 January 1991^{[‡]}	243 days	Ramaswamy Venkataraman
8		Khurshed Alam Khan (1919–2013); Governor of Goa until 17 March 1991	Uttar Pradesh	17 January 1991	2 December 1999	8 years, 330 days	Ramaswamy Venkataraman
9		V. S. Ramadevi; IAS (Retd) (1934–2013)	Andhra Pradesh	2 December 1999	20 February 2002	2 years, 80 days	K. R. Narayanan
10		T. N. Chaturvedi; IAS (Retd) (1928–2020)	Uttar Pradesh	21 August 2002	20 August 2007	4 years, 364 days	K. R. Narayanan
11		Rameshwar Thakur (1925–2015)	Jharkhand	21 August 2007	29 June 2009^{[§]} (Note: Transferred as the Governor of Madhya Pradesh)	1 year, 312 days	Pratibha Patil
12		H. R. Bhardwaj (1939–2020)	Punjab	30 June 2009	28 June 2014	4 years, 363 days	Pratibha Patil
13		Konijeti Rosaiah (1933–2021) (Additional Charge)	Andhra Pradesh	29 June 2014	31 August 2014	63 days	Pranab Mukherjee
14		Vajubhai Vala (born 1937)	Gujarat	1 September 2014	10 July 2021	6 years, 312 days	Pranab Mukherjee
15		Thawar Chand Gehlot (born 1948)	Madhya Pradesh	11 July 2021	16 October 2026	5 years, 97 days	Ram Nath Kovind
16		Dr. Sudha Yadav (born 1965)	Haryana	16 October 2026	Incumbent	12 days	Droupadi Murmu

== Oath ==
emba naanú, Devara hesarinalli pramana maaduttene enendra, naanú dhrudhavagi matthu nishtha-purvakavagi ____ (State Name, e.g., Karnataka) rajyada raajyapala huddethiya karthavyagalannú shraddheyinda nirvahisuttene matthu nanna purna samarthyadinda samvidhana matthu kanoonannú kapaduttene, samrakshisuttene matthu rakshisuttene haagú naanú ____ (State Name) rajyada janara seve matthu kalyanakkagi nannannú naanu samarpisikolluttene."
