= List of governors of Assam =

Assam's governors

Governor of Assam
- Emblem of Assam

- Flag of India

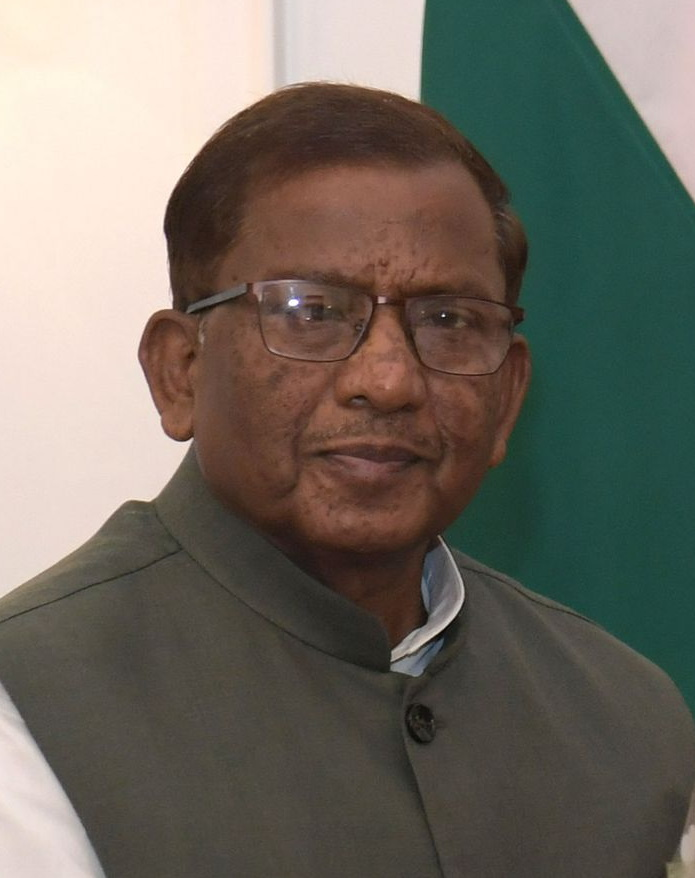
- Incumbent; Lakshman Prasad Acharya since 30 July 2024
- Style: His Excellency
- Residence: Lok Bhavan, Guwahati
- Appointer: President of India
- Term length: At the pleasure of the president
- Inaugural holder: Muhammad Saleh Akbar Hydari
- Formation: 15 August 1947; 79 years ago
- Website: lokbhavan.assam.gov.in

This is a list of governors of Assam. The governor of Assam is the nominal head of the Indian state of Assam. The governor is appointed by the president of India. The current governor is Lakshman Acharya.

== Powers and functions ==
The governor has:

- Executive powers related to administration, appointments and removals
- Legislative powers related to lawmaking and the state legislature, that is Vidhan Sabha or Vidhan Parishad
- Discretionary powers to be carried out according to the discretion of the governor

== List of governors ==
Legend

- ^{†} Died in office
- ^{§} Transferred
- ^{‡} Resigned/removed

Color key

- indicates acting/additional charge

#	Portrait	Name (born – died)	Home state	Tenure in office			Appointer (President)
#	Portrait	Name (born – died)	Home state	From	To	Time in office	Appointer (President)
1		Sir Muhammad Saleh Akbar Hydari KCIE CSI ICS (1894–1948)	Hyderabad	4 May 1947	28 December 1948^{[†]}	1 year, 238 days	Lord Mountbatten (Governor-General)
2		Justice Sir Ronald Francis Lodge (1889–1960) (Acting)	–	30 December 1948	15 February 1949	47 days	C. Rajagopalachari (Governor-General)
3		Sri Prakasa (1890–1971)	Uttar Pradesh	16 February 1949	26 May 1950	1 year, 99 days	C. Rajagopalachari (Governor-General)
4		Jairamdas Daulatram (1891–1979	Maharashtra	27 May 1950	14 May 1956	5 years, 353 days	Rajendra Prasad
5		Justice (Retd); Saiyid Fazl Ali (1886–1959)	Bihar	15 May 1956	22 August 1959^{[†]}	3 years, 99 days	Rajendra Prasad
6		Justice Chandreswar Prasad Sinha Chief Justice, Assam High Court (Acting)	Bihar	23 August 1959	13 October 1959	51 days	Rajendra Prasad
7		General; S. M. Shrinagesh (Retd) (1903–1977)	Maharashtra	14 October 1959	12 November 1960	1 year, 29 days	Rajendra Prasad
8		Vishnu Sahay ICS (1901–1989) (Acting)	Uttar Pradesh	12 November 1960	12 February 1961	92 days	Rajendra Prasad
(7)		General; S. M. Shrinagesh (Retd) (1903–1977)	Maharashtra	13 February 1961	7 September 1962	1 year, 206 days	Rajendra Prasad
(8)		Vishnu Sahay; ICS (Retd) (1901–1989)	Uttar Pradesh	8 September 1962	16 April 1968	5 years, 221 days	Sarvepalli Radhakrishnan
9		Braj Kumar Nehru; ICS (Retd) (1909–2001)	Uttar Pradesh	17 April 1968	7 December 1970	2 years, 234 days	Zakir Husain
10		Justice Parbati Kumar Goswami (1913–1992) (Acting)	Assam	8 December 1970	4 January 1971	27 days	V. V. Giri
(9)		Braj Kumar Nehru; ICS (Retd) (1909–2001)	Uttar Pradesh	5 January 1971	18 September 1973	2 years, 256 days	V. V. Giri
11		Lallan Prasad Singh; ICS (Retd) (1912–1998)	Bihar	19 September 1973	11 August 1981	7 years, 326 days	V. V. Giri
12		Prakash Mehrotra (1925–1988)	Uttar Pradesh	12 August 1981	28 March 1984^{[‡]}	2 years, 229 days	Neelam Sanjiva Reddy
13		Justice Tribeni Sahai Misra (1922–2005) (Acting)	Uttar Pradesh	28 March 1984	15 April 1984	18 days	Zail Singh
14		Bhishma Narain Singh (1933–2018)	Bihar	15 April 1984	11 May 1989	5 years, 26 days	Zail Singh
15		Hari Dev Joshi (1920–1995)	Rajasthan	10 May 1989	21 July 1989^{[‡]}	72 days	Ramaswamy Venkataraman
16		Justice Anisetti Raghuvir (1929–2007) (Acting)	Andhra Pradesh	27 July 1989	1 May 1990	278 days	Ramaswamy Venkataraman
17		Devi Das Thakur (1929–2007)	Jammu and Kashmir	2 May 1990	17 March 1991^{[‡]}	319 days	Ramaswamy Venkataraman
18		Lokanath Misra (1921–2009)	Orissa	17 March 1991	1 September 1997	6 years, 168 days	Ramaswamy Venkataraman
19		Lieutenant General; Srinivas Kumar Sinha (Retd); PVSM ADC (1926–2016)	Bihar	1 September 1997	21 April 2003^{[§]} (Note: Transferred as the Governor of Jammu and Kashmir)	5 years, 232 days	K. R. Narayanan
20		Arvind Dave IPS (Retd) (born 1940) (Additional charge)	Uttar Pradesh	21 April 2003	5 June 2003	45 days	A. P. J. Abdul Kalam
21		Lieutenant General; Ajai Singh; PVSM AVSM (1934–2023)	Rajasthan	5 June 2003	4 July 2008	5 years, 29 days	A. P. J. Abdul Kalam
22		Shiv Charan Mathur (1927–2009)	Rajasthan	4 July 2008	25 June 2009^{[†]}	356 days	Pratibha Patil
23		Kateekal Sankaranarayanan (1932–2022) (Additional charge)	Kerala	26 June 2009	26 July 2009^{[§]} (Note: Transferred as the Governor of Jharkhand)	30 days	Pratibha Patil
24		Syed Sibtey Razi (1939–2022)	Uttar Pradesh	27 July 2009	10 December 2009	136 days	Pratibha Patil
25		Janaki Ballabh Patnaik (1927–2015)	Odisha	11 December 2009	10 December 2014	4 years, 364 days	Pratibha Patil
26		Padmanabha Balakrishna Acharya (1931–2023) (Additional charge)	Karnataka	11 December 2014	21 August 2016	1 year, 254 days	Pranab Mukherjee
27		Banwarilal Purohit (born 1940)	Maharashtra	22 August 2016	9 October 2017^{[§]} (Note: Transferred as the Governor of Tamil Nadu)	1 year, 48 days	Pranab Mukherjee
28		Jagdish Mukhi (born 1942)	National Capital Territory of Delhi	10 October 2017	21 February 2023	5 years, 134 days	Ram Nath Kovind
29		Gulab Chand Kataria (born 1944)	Rajasthan	22 February 2023	29 July 2024^{[§]} (Note: Transferred as the Governor of Punjab and Administrator of Chandigarh)	1 year, 158 days	Droupadi Murmu
30		Lakshman Prasad Acharya (born 1954)	Uttar Pradesh	30 July 2024	Incumbent	2 years, 108 days	Droupadi Murmu

== Timeline ==
Timeline of Assam governors

== Oath ==
Moi, [Name of the Governor], Ishwarar nameye shapath loisho je moi nishtharey [Name of the State] rajyar rajyapalar karyabhar palon korim (boba, rajyapalar karia nibah korim) aru mur xadhonamote sangbidhan aru ainor rakhya, khurakhya aru pratirakhya korim aru moi [Name of the State] rajyar janamonor kalyan aru xewat niorjit thakim."
