= 1972 in India =

- Centuries: 18th; 19th; 20th; 21st
- Decades: 1950s; 1960s; 1970s; 1980s; 1990s
- See also: List of years in India; Timeline of Indian history

Events in the year 1972 in the Republic of India.

== Incumbents ==
- President of India – V. V. Giri
- Prime Minister of India – Indira Gandhi
- Vice President of India – Gopal Swarup Pathak
- Chief Justice of India – S. M. Sikri

=== Governors ===
- Andhra Pradesh – Khandubhai Kasanji Desai
- Assam – Braj Kumar Nehru
- Bihar – D. K. Barooah
- Gujarat – Shriman Narayan
- Haryana – Birendra Narayan Chakraborty
- Himachal Pradesh – S. Chakravarti
- Jammu and Kashmir – Bhagwan Sahay
- Karnataka – Dharma Vira (until 1 February), Mohan Lal Sukhadia (starting 1 February)
- Kerala – V. Viswanathan
- Madhya Pradesh – Satya Narayan Sinha
- Maharashtra – Ali Yavar Jung
- Manipur – Braj Kumar Nehru (starting 21 January)
- Meghalaya – Braj Kumar Nehru
- Nagaland – Braj Kumar Nehru
- Odisha –
  - until 30 June: Shaukatullah Shah Ansari
  - 1 July-8 November: Sardar Yojendra Singh
  - starting 8 November: B. D. Jatti
- Punjab – Dadappa Chintappa Pavate
- Rajasthan – Sardar Hukam Singh (until 1 July), Sardar Jogendra Singh (starting 1 July)
- Tamil Nadu – Kodardas Kalidas Shah
- Tripura – Braj Kumar Nehru
- Uttar Pradesh –
  - until 30 June: Bezawada Gopala Reddy
  - 1 July-13 November: Shashi Kant Varma
  - starting 14 November: Akbar Ali Khan
- West Bengal – Anthony Lancelot Dias

== Events ==
- National income - ₹552,453 million

=== January - June ===
- 21 January – Manipur, Tripura and Meghalaya gets statehood.
- 19 March – India and Bangladesh sign a friendship treaty, after the withdrawal of the Indian troops.
- 26 March – Mathura rape case.
- 14 June - Japan Air Lines Flight 471 crashed at Palam, Delhi killing 82 of the 87 on board.
- 26 June - Reserve Bank of India fixes buying and selling rates of Pound sterling with Indian rupee at £5.2910 and £5.2632 per Rs. 100 following the Government of the United Kingdom decision to float Pound sterling on 23 June. However the central rate remain unchanged at £5.2721 per Rs. 100.

=== July - December ===
- 2 July – Following Pakistan's surrender to India in the Indo-Pakistani War of 1971, both nations sign the historic bilateral Simla Agreement, agreeing to settle their disputes peacefully.
- 4 July - Reserve Bank of India revises buying and selling rates of Pound sterling with Indian rupee at £5.3333 and £5.3050 per Rs. 100 and kept central rates unchanged.
- 10 July – A stampede of elephants kills 24 people in the Chandaka Forest, Orissa.
- August - Expulsion of Indians from Uganda
- 17 October - M. G. Ramachandran, forms the All India Anna Dravida Munnetra Kazhagam by splitting from Dravida Munnetra Kazhagam starting a new phase in Dravidian movement.
- 19 October - Indian businessman Jayanti Dharma Teja sentenced to three year imprisonment for falsification of accounts of Jayanti Shipping Company.
- 15 November - Jharkhand Mukti Morcha was formed for independent statehood of Jharkhand from Bihar on birthday of Birsa Munda

== Law ==
- 5 April - Armed Forces (Assam and Manipur) Special Powers (Amendment) Act amended to include new states and union territories of Northeast India.
- 15 August - Postal Index Number (PIN Code) introduced in India.
- 9 September - Wild Life (Protection) Act, 1972 enacted.
- 31 October – Supreme Court of India began hearing of Kesavananda Bharati v. State of Kerala case.

== Births ==
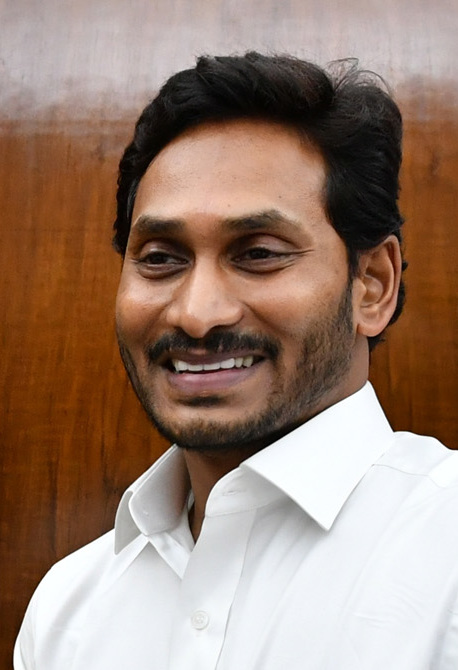
- Y. S. Jagan Mohan Reddy
  24 February – Pooja Bhatt, actress, producer and director.
- 28 March – Eby J. Jose, journalist and human rights activist
- 15 April – Mandira Bedi, actress, model and television presenter.
- 20 April – Mamta Kulkarni, actress.
- 17 May – T. Udhayachandran, IAS.
- 25 May - Karan Johar, actor, host, director and producer.
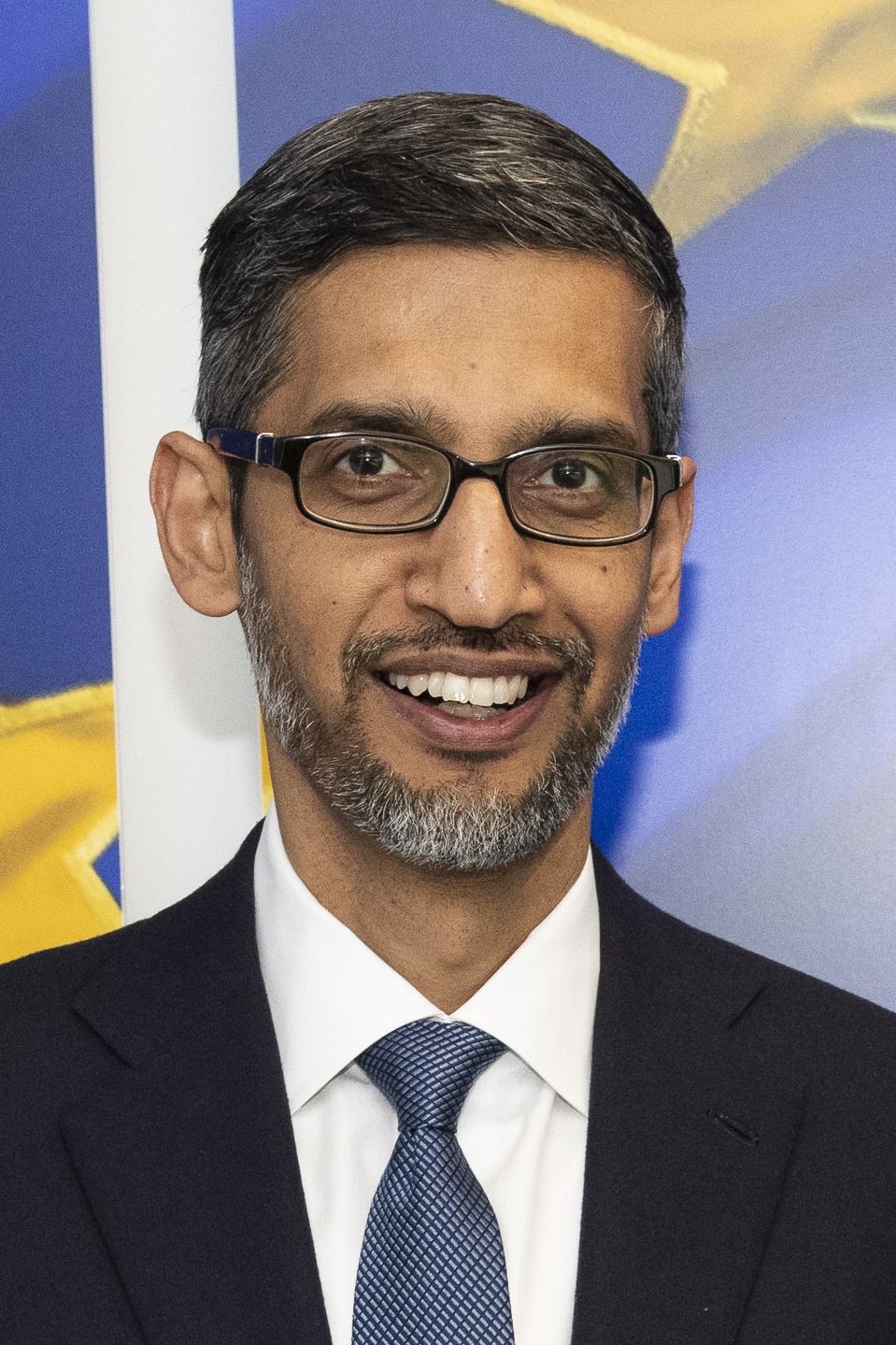
- Sundar Pichai
  10 June – Sundar Pichai, CEO Alphabet Inc.
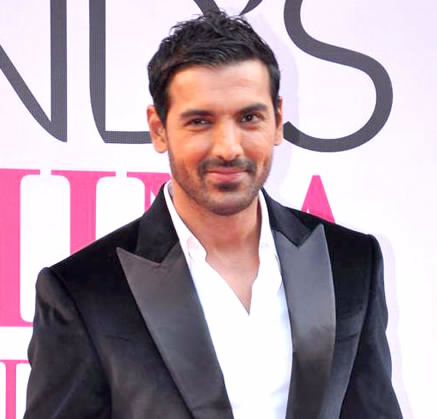
- John Abraham
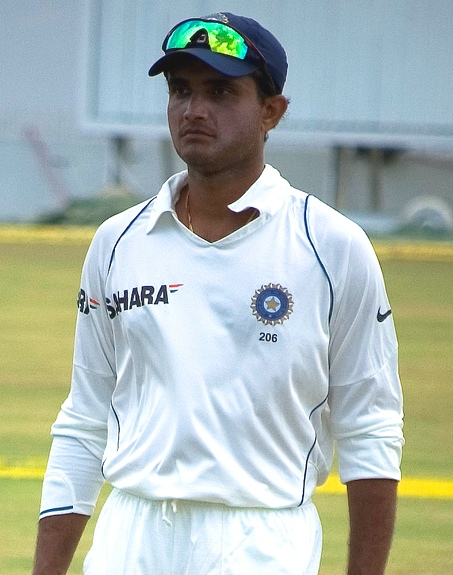
  Sourav Ganguly
  8 July – Sourav Ganguly, cricketer.
- 28 July – Ayesha Jhulka, actress.
- 17 November – Roja Selvamani, actress and politician.
- 18 November – Zubeen Garg, Indian singer and actor
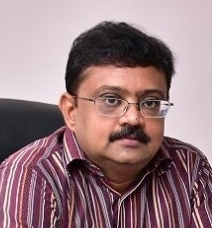
- T. Udhayachandran
  17 December – John Abraham, actor.
- 21 December – Jagan Mohan Reddy, politician.
- 26 December – Hari Gopalakrishnan, film director.

== Deaths ==
- 31 March – Meena Kumari, actress (b. 1932).
- 14 April – George Reddy, Student and PDSU leader at OU campus Hyderabad (b. 1947).
- 29 May – Prithviraj Kapoor, actor and director (b. 1906).
- 20 July – Geeta Dutt, playback singer (b. 1930).
- 24 August – Venkatarama Ramalingam Pillai, freedom fighter and Tamil poet (b. 1888).

== See also ==
- List of Bollywood films of 1972
