= 1973 in India =

- Centuries: 18th; 19th; 20th; 21st
- Decades: 1950s; 1960s; 1970s; 1980s; 1990s
- See also: List of years in India; Timeline of Indian history

These are the events that happened during 1973 in the Republic of India:

== Incumbents ==
- President of India – V. V. Giri
- Prime Minister of India – Indira Gandhi
- Vice President of India – Gopal Swarup Pathak
- Chief Justice of India – Sarv Mittra Sikri (until 26 April), Ajit Nath Ray (starting 26 April)

=== Governors ===
- Andhra Pradesh – Khandubhai Kasanji Desai
- Assam – Braj Kumar Nehru (until 19 September), L. P. Singh (starting 19 September)
- Bihar – Dev Kant Baruah (until 4 February), Ramchandra Dhondiba Bhandare (starting 4 February)
- Gujarat –
  - until 17 March: Shriman Narayan
  - 17 March-4 April: P.N. Bhagwati
  - starting 4 April: Kambanthodath Kunhan Vishwanatham
- Haryana – Birendra Narayan Chakraborty
- Himachal Pradesh – S. Chakravarti
- Jammu and Kashmir – Bhagwan Sahay (until 3 July), L. K. Jha (starting 3 July)
- Karnataka – Mohanlal Sukhadia
- Kerala – V. Viswanathan (until 1 April), N. N. Wanchoo (starting 1 April)
- Madhya Pradesh – Satya Narayan Sinha
- Maharashtra – Ali Yavar Jung
- Manipur – B. K. Nehru (until 20 September), L.P. Singh (starting 21 September)
- Meghalaya – B.K. Nehru (until 18 September), L.P. Singh (starting 18 September)
- Nagaland – B.K. Nehru (until 18 September), L.P. Singh (starting 18 September)
- Odisha – Basappa Danappa Jatti
- Punjab – Dadappa Chintappa Pavate (until 21 May), Mahendra Mohan Choudhry (starting 21 May)
- Rajasthan – Sardar Jogendra Singh
- Tamil Nadu – Kodardas Kalidas Shah
- Tripura – B. K. Nehru (until 23 September), L. P. Singh (starting 23 September)
- Uttar Pradesh – Akbar Ali Khan
- West Bengal – Anthony Lancelot Dias

== Events ==
- National income — ₹672,407 million
- 10 January — P. V. Narasimha Rao resigns as Chief minister of Andhra Pradesh following the resignation of ministers from Coastal Andhra post the 1972 Jai Andhra movement.
- 1 April – Government campaign to save the tiger from extinction.
- 24 April –
  - Verdict of Kesavananda Bharati v. State of Kerala pronounced. Supreme Court of India upholds basic structure doctrine.
  - Chipko movement in Garhwal division against logging under the leadership of Chandi Prasad Bhatt.
- 24 May — Provincial Armed Constabulary revolt in Lucknow claims more than 40 lives.
- 31 May – Indian Airlines Flight 440 crash at Palam International Airport killing 48 of the 65 on board.
- 15 August - Indira Gandhi buries a Time capsule named Kaalapatra in Red Fort during Independence Day.
- 27 October — Indira Gandhi inaugurates world's first Women Police Station in the world at Kozhikode.
- 1 November – State of Mysore is renamed Karnataka State.
- 12 November — Bharatiya Jana Sangh leader Atal Bihari Vajpayee and two other leaders drove a Bullock cart to the Parliament of India on the first day of winter session to protest against fuel price hike in India following the oil crisis.
- 27 November — Aruna Shanbaug case.

== Law ==
Foreign Exchange Regulation Act was passed. Code of Criminal Procedure (CrPC) was enacted.

== Births ==
=== January to June ===
- 4 January – D. J. Gokulakrishnan, cricketer. (d. 2023)
- 5 January – Uday Chopra, actor.
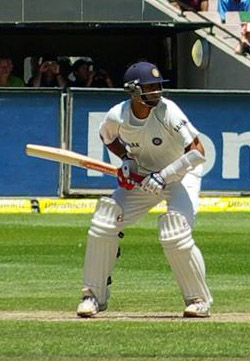
- Rahul Dravid
  11 January – Rahul Dravid, cricketer.
- 12 January – Saakshi Tanwar, actress.
- 20 February – Priyanshu Chatterjee, film actor, previously model.
- 14 March – Rohit Shetty, film director.
- 20 March – Arjun Atwal, golfer.
- 3 April – Prabhu Deva, actor, choreographer and director.
- 6 April – Prashanth, actor.
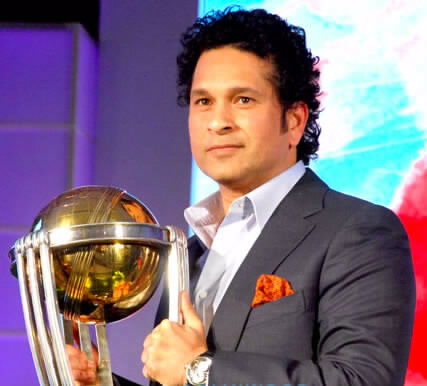
- Sachin Tendulkar
  24 April – Sachin Tendulkar, cricketer.
- 26 April – Samuthirakani, actor and film director.
- 1 May – Diana Hayden, Miss World and actress
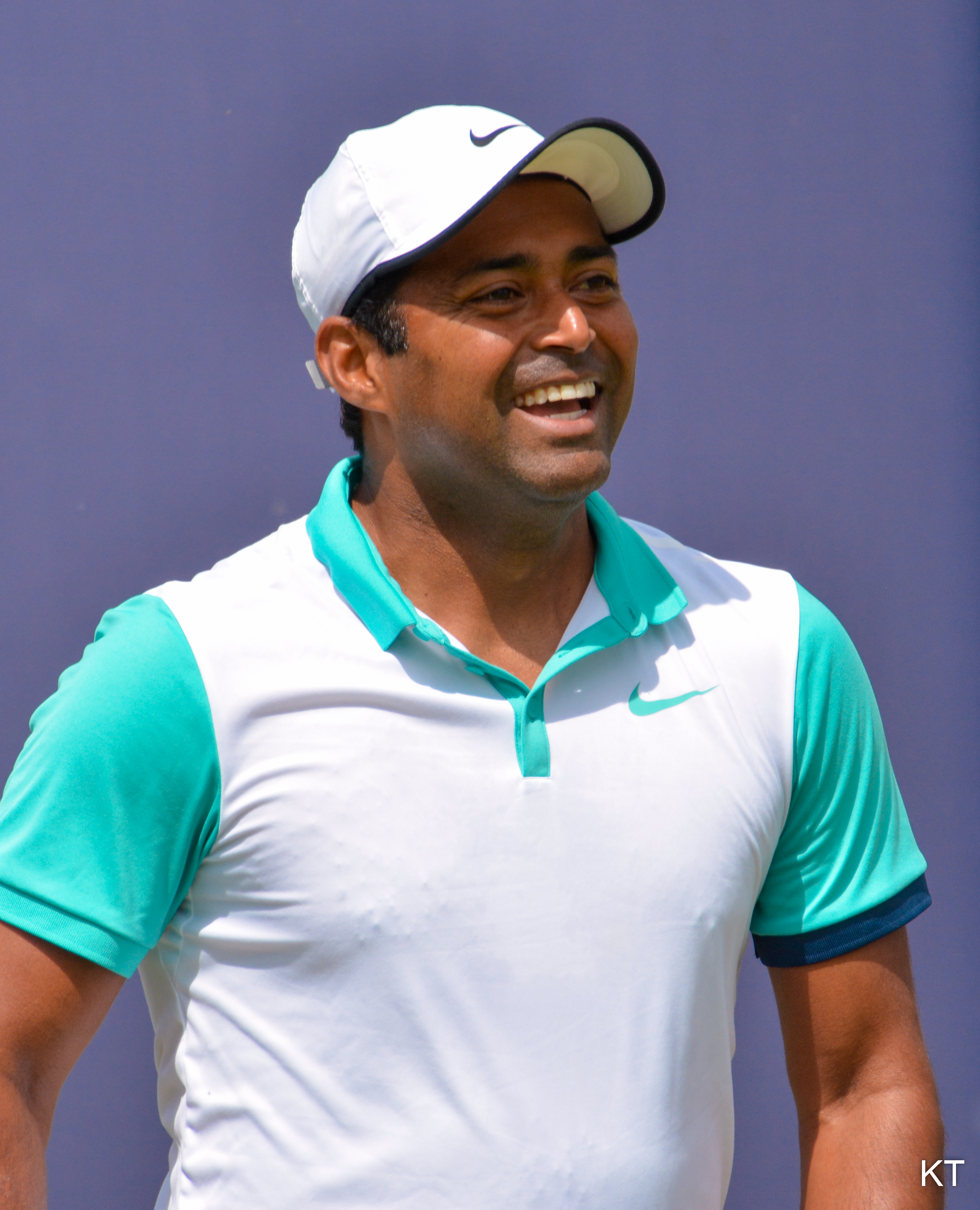
- Leander Paes
  17 June – Leander Paes, tennis player.
- 13 June – Arunabha Sengupta, novelist and sports writer
- 18 June – Baljit Singh Dhillon, field hockey player.
- 29 June – Samir Choughule, actor and writer

=== July to December ===
- 30 July – Sonu Sood, actor and philanthropist.
- 1 September – Ram Kapoor, actor.
- 5 October – Vishwas Nangare Patil, Indian police officer.
- 10 October – S. S. Rajamouli, film director.
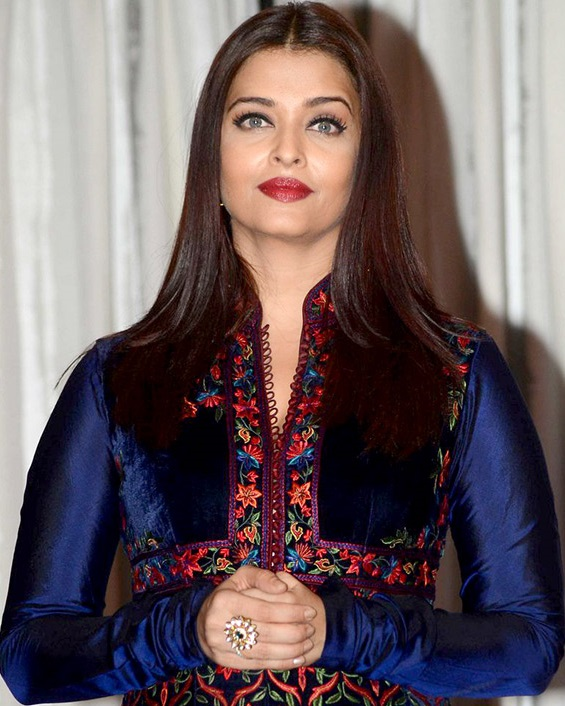
- Aishwarya Rai
  1 November – Aishwarya Rai, actress.
- 27 November – Satyendra Dubey, LATE Indian Engineering Service (IES) officer. (d. 2003)

== Deaths ==
- 31 May – Mohan Kumaramangalam, politician (b. 1916).
- 13 September – Sajjad Zaheer, Urdu writer and revolutionary (b. 1905)
- 14 October – Siddavanahalli Krishna Sarma, writer, translator, freedom fighter, journalist, social worker and educationist (b. 1904)
- 20 November – Prabodhankar Thackeray, Politician, Social Activist in the Samyukta Maharashtra Movement, Author (b. 1885)
- 24 December - Periyar social reformer who started Self-Respect Movement and laid the rock bed of Dravidian movement.(b.1879)
- 30 December – V. Nagayya, actor, composer, director, producer, writer and playback singer (b. 1904).

== See also ==
- List of Bollywood films of 1973
