= 1971 in India =

- Centuries: 18th; 19th; 20th; 21st
- Decades: 1950s; 1960s; 1970s; 1980s; 1990s
- See also: List of years in India; Timeline of Indian history

Events in the year 1971 in the Republic of India.

== Incumbents ==
- President of India – V. V. Giri
- Prime Minister of India – Indira Gandhi
- Vice President of India – Gopal Swarup Pathak
- Chief Justice of India – Jayantilal Chhotalal Shah (until 21 January), Sarv Mittra Sikri (starting 22 January)

=== Governors ===
- Andhra Pradesh – Khandubhai Kasanji Desai
- Assam – Braj Kumar Nehru
- Bihar –
  - until 20 January: Nityanand Kanungo
  - 21 January-31 January: U.N. Sinha
  - starting 1 February: Dev Kant Baruah
- Gujarat – Shriman Narayan
- Haryana – Birendra Narayan Chakraborty
- Himachal Pradesh – S. Chakravarti
- Jammu and Kashmir – Bhagwan Sahay
- Karnataka – Dharma Vira (starting 23 October)
- Kerala – V. Viswanathan
- Madhya Pradesh – K. Chengalaraya Reddy (until 7 March), Satya Narayan Sinha (starting 7 March)
- Maharashtra – P V Cherian (until 26 February), Ali Yavar Jung (starting 26 February)
- Meghalaya – B.K. Nehru
- Nagaland – B.K. Nehru
- Odisha – Shaukatullah Shah Ansari
- Punjab – Dadappa Chintappa Pavate
- Rajasthan – Sardar Hukam Singh
- Tamil Nadu – Sardar Ujjal Singh (until 25 May), Kodardas Kalidas Shah (starting 26 May)
- Uttar Pradesh – Bezawada Gopala Reddy
- West Bengal – Shanti Swaroop Dhavan (until 21 August), Anthony Lancelot Dias (starting 21 August)

== Events ==
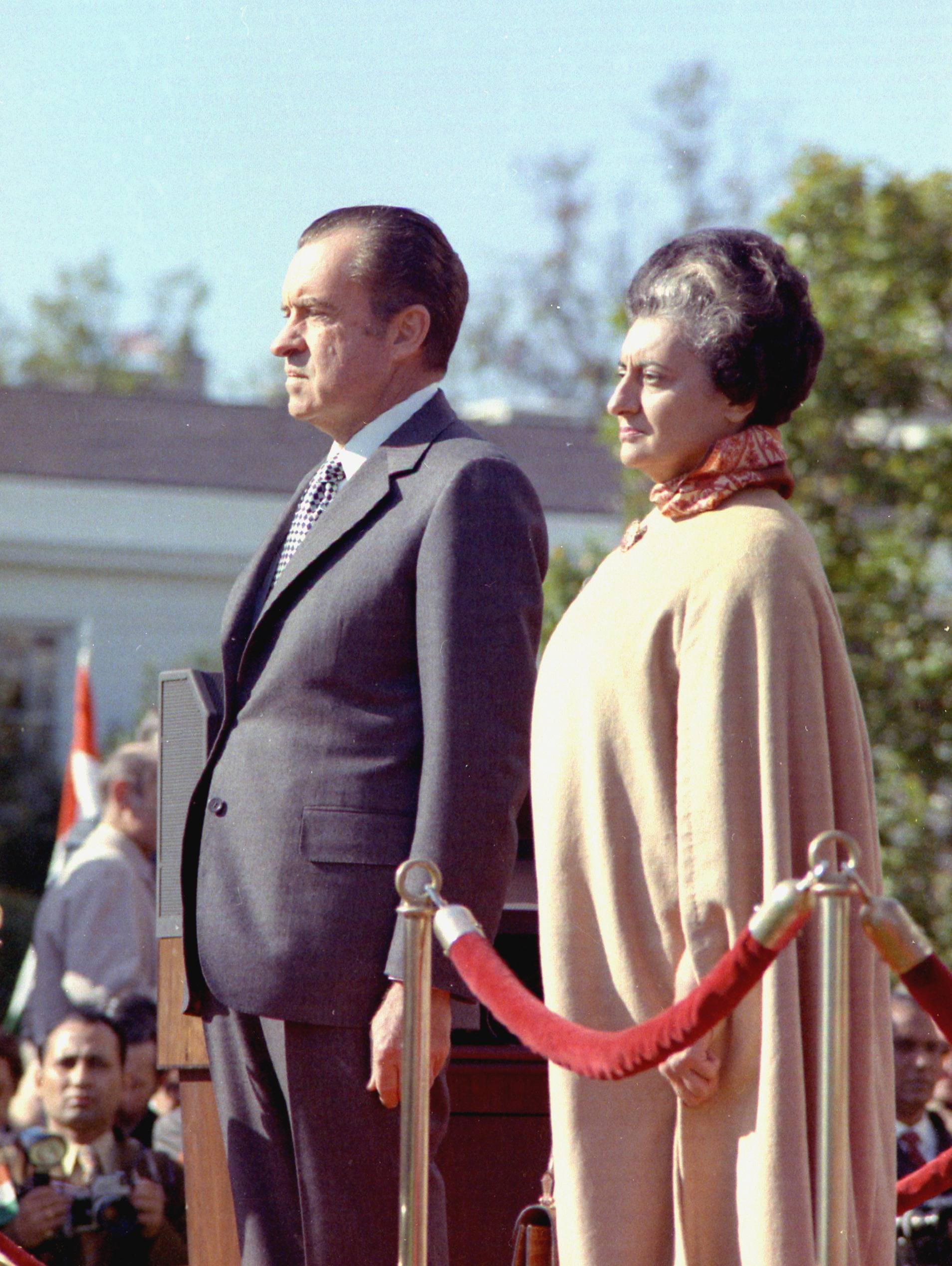
Richard Nixon and Indira Gandhi, 4 November 1971

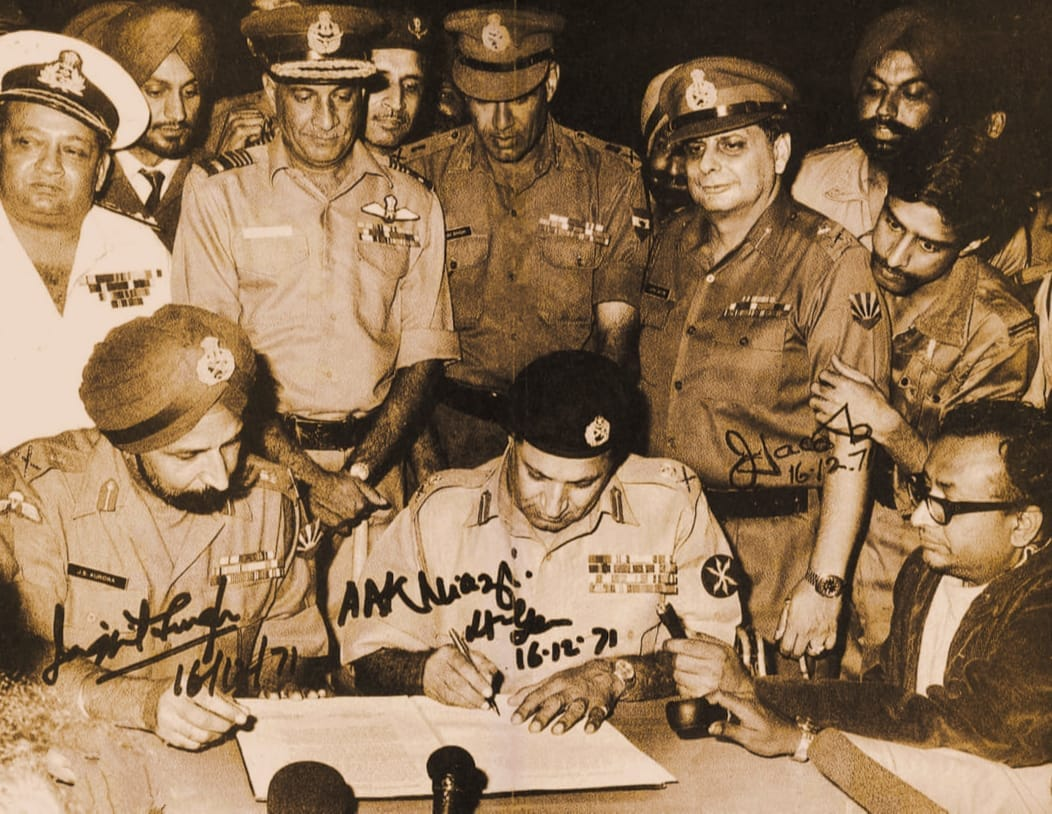
Photograph of Lt Gen Niazi signing the Instrument of Surrender which resulted in Indian victory in Indo-Pakistani war of 1971

- National income - ₹501,199 million
- 25 January – Himachal Pradesh becomes the 18th Indian state and East Punjab is reduced to its current form as Doaba.
- 30 January - 1971 Indian Airlines hijacking by Kashmiri militants.
- 20 February - The chairman of All India Forward Bloc, Hemanta Kumar Basu got murdered by political opponents in West Bengal.
- 19 April – The provisional government of Bangladesh exiled flees to West Bengal.
- 24 May - Nagarwala case.
- 31 July - Government of India abolishes Privy purse in India through 26th Amendment of the Constitution of India.
- 15 August - In wake of Nixon shock Government of India announces that, United States dollar - Indian rupee par value at Rs. 7.50 for 1 $ would remain unchanged and left Pound sterling floating by stopping the support operations.
- 25 August – The former East Pakistan and eastern Bengal are flooded; thousands flee the area.
- 29 October – The Odisha cyclone in the Bay of Bengal, in Orissa State in India, kills 10,000.
- 4 November - Two day state visit by Indira Gandhi to United States.
- 3 December – 17 December: India and Pakistan fight their second major war, over East Pakistan, which ends after 93,000 Pakistani troops surrender. The new nation of Bangladesh is created out of East Pakistan.
- 3 December
  - The Indo-Pakistani War of 1971 begins as Pakistan attacks 9 Indian airbases. The next day India launches a massive invasion of East Pakistan.
  - Indira Gandhi declares State of emergency in India for the second time, following external aggression.
  - The Indian navy destroyer INS Rajput sinks Pakistani submarine PNS Ghazi (former USS Diablo).
- 6 December - India acknowledges Bangladesh as a free and sovereign state through declaration made by Indira Gandhi in parliament.
- 16 December – Victory Day of Bangladesh: The Pakistan Army surrenders to the Joint Force i.e. Mukti Bahini (Freedom Force) and the Indian Armed Forces, officially ending the Bangladesh Liberation War and creating the new nation state of Bangladesh.
- 20 December - Government of India links Indian rupee with Pound sterling following the devaluation of United States dollar post Smithsonian Agreement. The rupee was pegged at par value of Rs. 18.9677 is to 1 £ and Pound was designated as the intervention currency. The event marks the departure of Indian rupee from par value system to pegged regime.
- 29 - December - Minister of State for Agriculture A.P. Shinde announced that Government of India has decided to stop all wheat imports from United States before expiry of existing PL - 480 (Public Law).

== Law ==
- 22 January – S.M. Sikri became Chief Justice of India.
- 28 July – Law Minister H. R. Gokhale introduces Twenty-fourth Amendment of the Constitution of India and Twenty-fifth Amendment of the Constitution of India in Lok Sabha.
- 5 November – President of India gave his assent to Twenty-fourth Amendment of the Constitution of India.

== Sport ==
- India defeat West Indies in Port of Spain Trinidad for the first time ever to clinch the rubber 1-0. Sunil Gavaskar creates world record for scoring 774 runs in four tests. Ajit Wadekar was the Captain.
- Leslie Claudius (field hockey player) is awarded the Padma Shri.
- 24 August - India defeat England in the third and the final Test at the Oval. This happens to be India's first victory ever on the English soil.

== Births ==
- 4 February - Kothapalli Geetha, politician, Member of Parliament from Araku
- 27 February - Nirav Modi, businessman and fugitive
- 1 May – Ajith Kumar, actor and motor racing driver.
- 21 June - Butta Renuka, politician and member of parliament from Kurnool.
- 4 July – Sivakumar Veerasamy, scientist.
- 17 July – Soundarya, actress (d.2004).
- 5 August – Jude Menezes, field hockey player.
- 8 August – Ramandeep Singh, field hockey player.
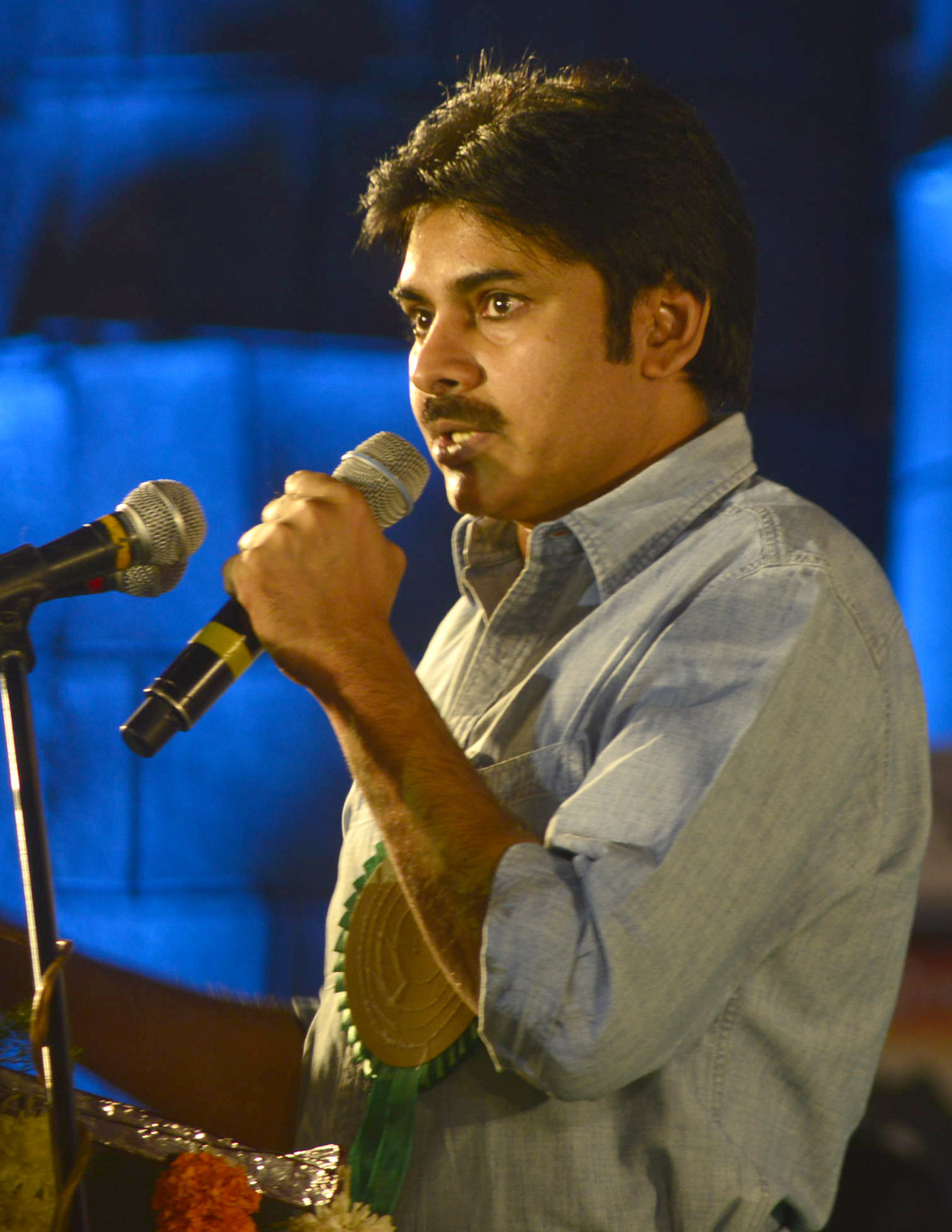
- Pawan Kalyan
  2 September – Pawan Kalyan, actor and film director.
- 20 September – Mysskin, film director, screenwriter, actor, singer, producer and composer.
- 2 November – Mekapati Goutham Reddy, politician and businessman (d.2022)
- 4 November – Tabu, actress.
- 19 November
  - Sundeep Malani, film director
  - Kiren Rijiju, politician, member of parliament from Arunachal West, Union Minister of State for Home Affairs.
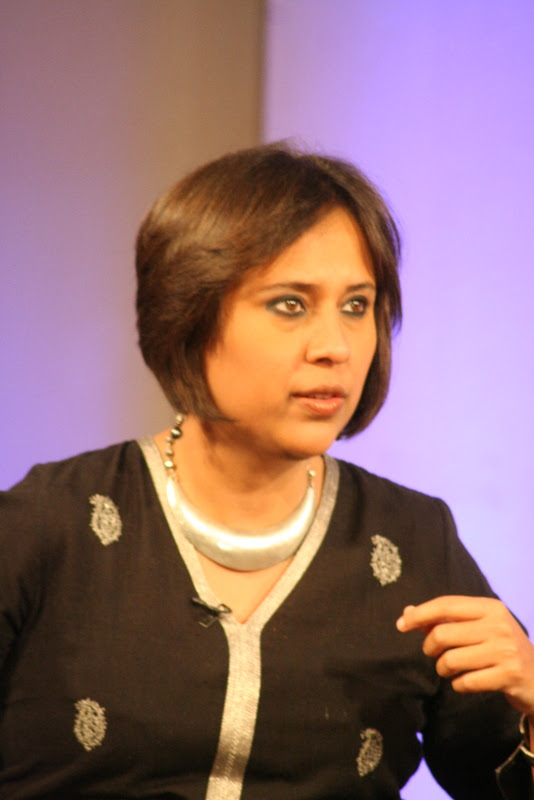
- Barkha Dutt
  18 December – Barkha Dutt, Television journalist.
- 25 December – Santhosh George Kulangara, businessman.
- 29 December – Heera Rajagopal, actress and philanthropist.
- Full date unknown:

- Sangeet Verma, photographer and photojournalist

== Deaths ==
- 6 January – P. C. Sorcar, stage magician (b. 1913).
- 5 August – Saroj Dutta, communist leader (b. 1914).
- Debaki Bose, film director, writer and actor (b. 1898).
- Keshavrao Date, actor (b. 1889).

== See also ==
- List of Bollywood films of 1971
