= 1968 in India =

- Centuries: 18th; 19th; 20th; 21st
- Decades: 1940s; 1950s; 1960s; 1970s; 1980s
- See also: List of years in India; Timeline of Indian history

Events in the year 1968 in the Federal Republic of India.

== Incumbents ==
- President of India – Zakir Husain
- Prime Minister of India – Indira Gandhi
- Vice President of India – V. V. Giri
- Chief Justice of India – Kailas Nath Wanchoo (until 24 February), Mohammad Hidayatullah (starting 24 February)

=== Governors ===
- Andhra Pradesh – Pattom A. Thanu Pillai (until 11 April), Khandubhai Kasanji Desai (starting 11 April)
- Assam – Vishnu Sahay (until 17 April), Braj Kumar Nehru (starting 17 April)
- Bihar – Nityanand Kanungo
- Gujarat – Shriman Narayan
- Haryana – Birendra Narayan Chakraborty
- Jammu and Kashmir – Bhagwan Sahay
- Karnataka – Gopal Swarup Pathak
- Kerala – Bhagwan Sahay (until 15 May), V. Viswanathan (starting 15 May)
- Madhya Pradesh – K. Chengalaraya Reddy
- Maharashtra – P V Cherian
- Nagaland – Vishnu Sahay (until 17 April), B.K. Nehru (starting 17 April)
- Odisha – Ajudhia Nath Khosla (until 30 January), Shaukatullah Shah Ansari (starting 30 January)
- Punjab – Dadappa Chintappa Pavate
- Rajasthan – Sardar Hukam Singh
- Uttar Pradesh – Bezawada Gopala Reddy
- West Bengal – Dharma Vira

== Events ==
- National income - ₹398,141 million
- 10 Jan - President of India withdraws emergency declared in 1962 as part of Sino-Indian War.
- 20 Feb –
  - The Beatles, Mia Farrow, and several other celebrities visit the ashram of Maharishi Mahesh Yogi in Rishikesh, India to study transcendental meditation.
  - West Bengal was put under President's rule under Article 356 of the Constitution of India, after the collapse of its coalition government and the resignation of Chief Minister P. C. Ghosh.
- 25 Feb - Rajeev Gandhi son of Indira Gandhi married an Italian named Sonia Maino.
- 29 Feb - Auroville established in Pondicherry with presence of 124 countries.
- 1 April - Tata Consultancy Services established as Tata Computer Systems.
- 8 April - The first political murder of Kannur takes place at Thalassery resulting in death of Rashtriya Swayamsevak Sangh worker's death.
- 12 April -
  - National Textile Corporation incorporated.
  - Indira Gandhi announced in Rae Bareilly that India will not sign the Treaty on the Non-Proliferation of Nuclear Weapons.
- 19 April - The first communal riots of Kanara region occurred in Mangalore leaving 28 injured and widespread arson.
- 25 Dec - Kilvenmani massacre, 44 Dalits (untouchables) burnt to death in Kizhavenmani village, Tamil Nadu.
- Three-language formula introduced through National Policy on Education

== Law ==
- 18 Jan - Official Language resolution passed by both houses of Parliament.
- 16 May - Public Provident Fund introduced through an act by the Parliament of India.
- 20 Aug - Enemy Property Act, 1968

== Births ==
- 10 January Atul Khatri, comedian
- 21 January
  - Sanjay Subrahmanyan, Carnatic vocalist.
  - Sundar C, actor and film director.
- 26 January – Ravi Teja, actor.
- 1 March – Kunjarani Devi, weightlifter.
- 23 March – Srikanth (Telugu actor), actor.
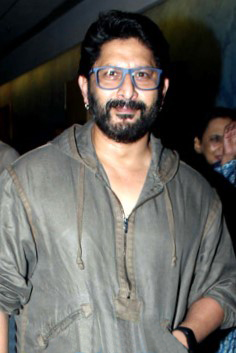
- Arshad Warsi
  19 April – Arshad Warsi, actor.
- 24 May – Raju Narayana Swamy, IAS officer.
- 14 June – Raj Thackeray, founder and president of Maharashtra Navnirman Sena.
- 2 July – Gautami, actress and politician.
- 6 July – Singampuli, actor and director.
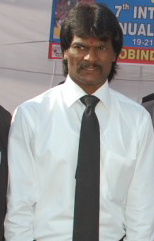
- Dhanraj Pillay
  16 July – Dhanraj Pillay, field hockey player.
- 20 July – S. J. Suryah, actor and director.
- 15 August
  - Anil Kumar Awana, politician.
  - Kailash Chandra Gahtori, politician (died 2024).
- 16 August – Arvind Kejriwal, politician
- 23 August – KK, playback singer (died 2022).
- 18 September – Upendra, actor, director and politician.
- 27 September – Rahul Dev, actor and model.
- 29 September – Samir Soni, actor.
- 9 November – Neelam, former actress, jewellery designer.
- 25 December - Sampath Raj, actor.

=== Full date unknown ===
- Abu Salem, mobster.

== Deaths ==
- A. R. Krishnashastry, writer, researcher and translator (born 1890).
- 19 November – Shri Rang Avadhoot, Saint who is regarded as an incarnation of Lord Dattatreya, (born 1898 in India)

== See also ==
- Bollywood films of 1968
