= 1969 in India =

- Centuries: 18th; 19th; 20th; 21st
- Decades: 1940s; 1950s; 1960s; 1970s; 1980s
- See also: List of years in India; Timeline of Indian history

Events in the year 1969 in the Republic of India.

== Incumbents ==
- President of India – Zakir Husain until 3 May, V. V. Giri until 20 July (acting president), Mohammad Hidayatullah until 24 August (acting president), V. V. Giri
- Prime Minister of India – Indira Gandhi
- Vice President of India – V. V. Giri until 3 May; Gopal Swarup Pathak
- Chief Justice of India – Mohammad Hidayatullah

=== Governors ===
- Andhra Pradesh – Khandubhai Kasanji Desai
- Assam – Braj Kumar Nehru
- Bihar – Nityanand Kanungo
- Gujarat – Shriman Narayan
- Haryana – Birendra Narayan Chakraborty
- Jammu and Kashmir – Bhagwan Sahay
- Karnataka – Gopal Swarup Pathak (until 30 August), vacant thereafter (starting 30 August)
- Kerala – V. Viswanathan
- Madhya Pradesh – K. Chengalaraya Reddy
- Maharashtra – P V Cherian (until 8 November), vacant thereafter (starting 8 November)
- Nagaland – B.K. Nehru
- Odisha – Shaukatullah Shah Ansari
- Punjab – Dadappa Chintappa Pavate
- Rajasthan – Sardar Hukam Singh
- Tamil Nadu – Sardar Ujjal Singh (starting 14 January)
- Uttar Pradesh – Bezawada Gopala Reddy
- West Bengal –
  - until 1 April: Dharma Vira
  - 1 April-19 September: Deep Narayan Sinha
  - starting 19 September: Shanti Swaroop Dhavan

== Events ==
- National income - ₹438,360 million
- 14 January - Madras State gets renamed to Tamil Nadu through parliamentary law.
- 1 March - The first Rajdhani Express commenced its journey between Delhi and Howrah.
- 12 July – Congress Parliamentary Board at Bangalore nominated Neelam Sanjiva Reddy as Congress's candidate for the post of President of India by a vote of four to two.
- 19 July -
  - 14 major private banks nationalized
  - Morarji Desai resigned from the post of Deputy Prime Minister of India.
- 18 September: Start of the 1969 Gujarat riots.
- 12 November – Congress Working Committee headed by S. Nijalingappa removed Indira Gandhi from primary membership of Congress Party.
- Indian National Congress splits into two factions. One led by Indira Gandhi and another led by Morarji Desai.
- Rajdhani Express was introduced
- Indian Space Research Organisation (ISRO) was set up
- Central Industrial Security Force (CISF) came into existence (10 March 1969)

== Law ==
• Registration of Births and Death Act ( RBD Act)

== Births ==
- 24 May – Sudhir Kumar Walia, Indian Army. (died 1999).
- 2 April – Ajay Devgan, actor and producer.
- 21 June – Padmapani Acharya, Indian Army. (died 1999).
- 24 August – Mukesh Tiwari, actor.
- 4 November – Rupini, actress.
- 7 November – Nandita Das, actress.
- 25 November – Sukanya, actress and dancer.
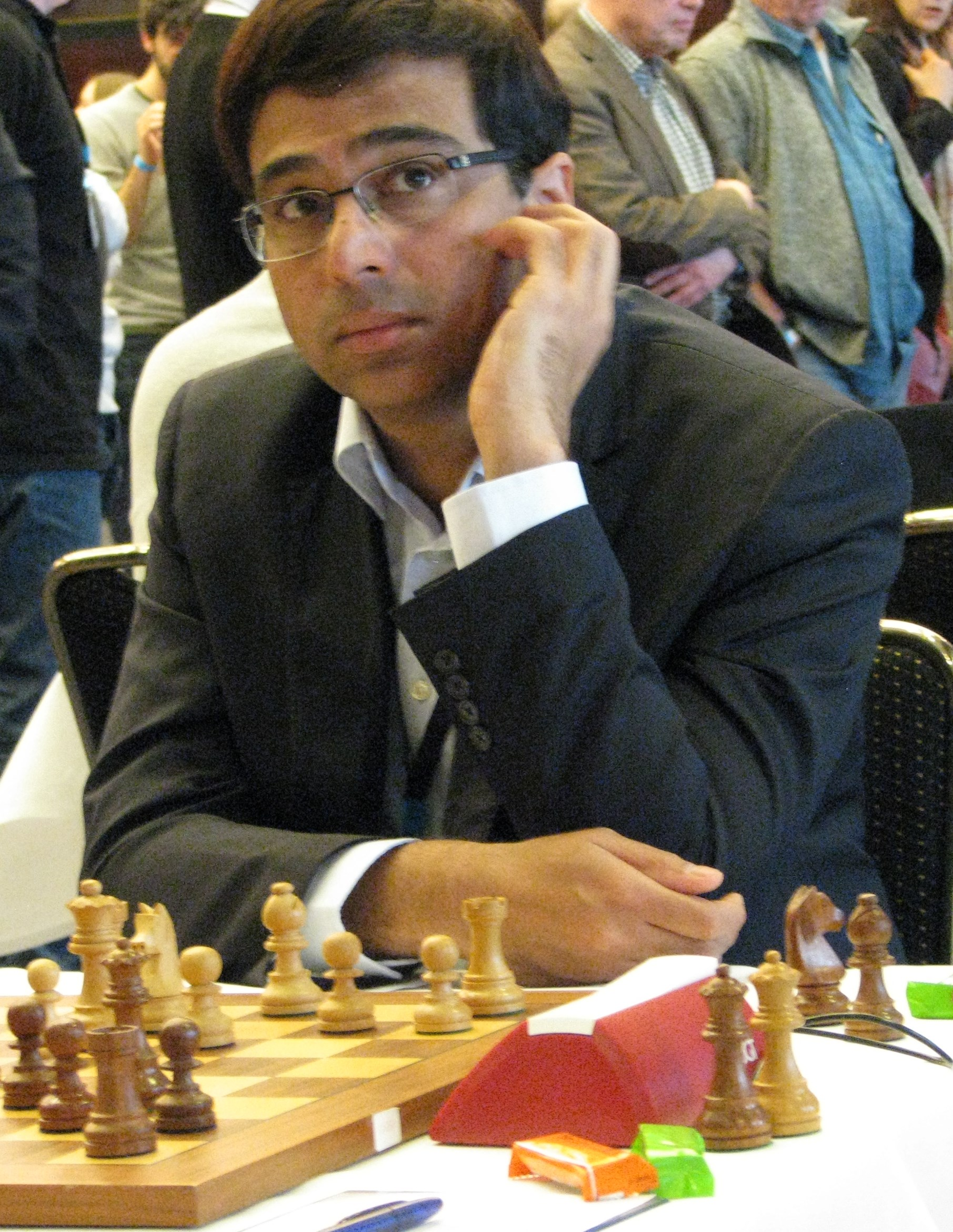
- Viswanathan Anand
  11 December – Viswanathan Anand, chess grandmaster and multiple time World Chess Champion.

=== Full date unknown ===
- Soumya Bhattacharya, journalist and author.
- M. Yoganathan, environmental activist.

== Deaths ==
- 27 January – Anukulchandra Chakravarty, social reformer and philanthropist (born 1888)
- 31 January – Meher Baba, mystic and spiritual master (born 1894).
- 23 February – Madhubala, actress (born 1933).
- 3 May – Zakir Husain, politician and third President of India (born 1897).
- 13 June – Acharya Atre, Writer, Poet, Social Activist in the Samyukta Maharashtra Movement (born 1898).
- 28 July – Annabhau Sathe, social reformer and writer (born 1920).

== See also ==
- List of Bollywood films of 1969

2 February C.N.Annadurai politician-chief Minister of Tamil Nadu(State of India)
