= 1970 in India =

- Centuries: 18th; 19th; 20th; 21st
- Decades: 1950s; 1960s; 1970s; 1980s; 1990s
- See also: List of years in India; Timeline of Indian history

The events in India during 1970

== Incumbents ==
=== Union Government ===
- President of India – V. V. Giri
- Prime Minister of India – Indira Gandhi
- Vice President of India – Gopal Swarup Pathak
- Chief Justice of India – Mohammad Hidayatullah (until 16 December), Jayantilal Chhotalal Shah (starting 17 December)

=== States: Governors ===
- Andhra Pradesh – Khandubhai Kasanji Desai
- Assam – Braj Kumar Nehru
- Bihar – Nityanand Kanungo
- Gujarat – Shriman Narayan
- Haryana – Birendra Narayan Chakraborty
- Jammu and Kashmir – Bhagwan Sahay
- Karnataka – Gopal Swarup Pathak
- Kerala – V. Viswanathan
- Madhya Pradesh – K. Chengalaraya Reddy
- Maharashtra – P V Cherian
- Meghalaya – Braj Kumar Nehru
- Nagaland – B.K. Nehru
- Odisha – Shaukatullah Shah Ansari
- Punjab – Dadappa Chintappa Pavate
- Rajasthan – Sardar Hukam Singh
- Tamil Nadu – Sardar Ujjal Singh
- Uttar Pradesh – Bezawada Gopala Reddy
- West Bengal – Shanti Swaroop Dhavan

== Events ==
- National income - ₹468,169 million
- 21 January - A state transport bus was torched by Communist Party of India (Marxist) workers at Chavassery, Kannur district killing four passengers.
- 4 March – New Pimpri-Chinchwad Municipal Corporation formed in the state of Maharashtra.
- 17 March - Sainbari political killings by Communists in West Bengal.
- 2 September - President of India V. V. Giri opens Vivekananda Rock Memorial.
- 7 September – Maharashtra Pollution Control Board is established under the provisions of Maharashtra Prevention of Water Pollution Act, 1969.
- 17 September - 1970 Kerala Legislative Assembly election in which Communist Party of India and Indian National Congress contested as a United Front against a Communist Party of India (Marxist) led coalition were held.
- 31 October - Mangalore Mail crashes into a stationary Cochin Mail at 8:10 p.m. (IST) at the Perambur station, Chennai, killing 16 and injuring 108.
- Bajaj Auto rolls out its 100,000th vehicle.

== Births ==
=== January to June ===
- 29 January – Rajyavardhan Singh Rathore, politician and Olympic medalist
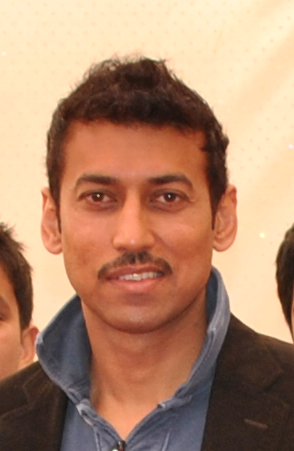
  Rajyavardhan Singh Rathore
- 21 February – Karunas, comedian-actor.
- 21 March – Shobana, actress and dancer.
- 16 April – Mukesh Kumar, field hockey player.
- 26 April – Saranya Ponvannan, actress.
- 18 May – Rekha Josephine, actress.
- 1 June – R. Madhavan, actor.
- 18 June – Arvind Swamy, actor.
- 19 June – Rahul Gandhi, Indian politician, leader of the Indian National Congress and current Leader of Opposition in Lok Sabha.
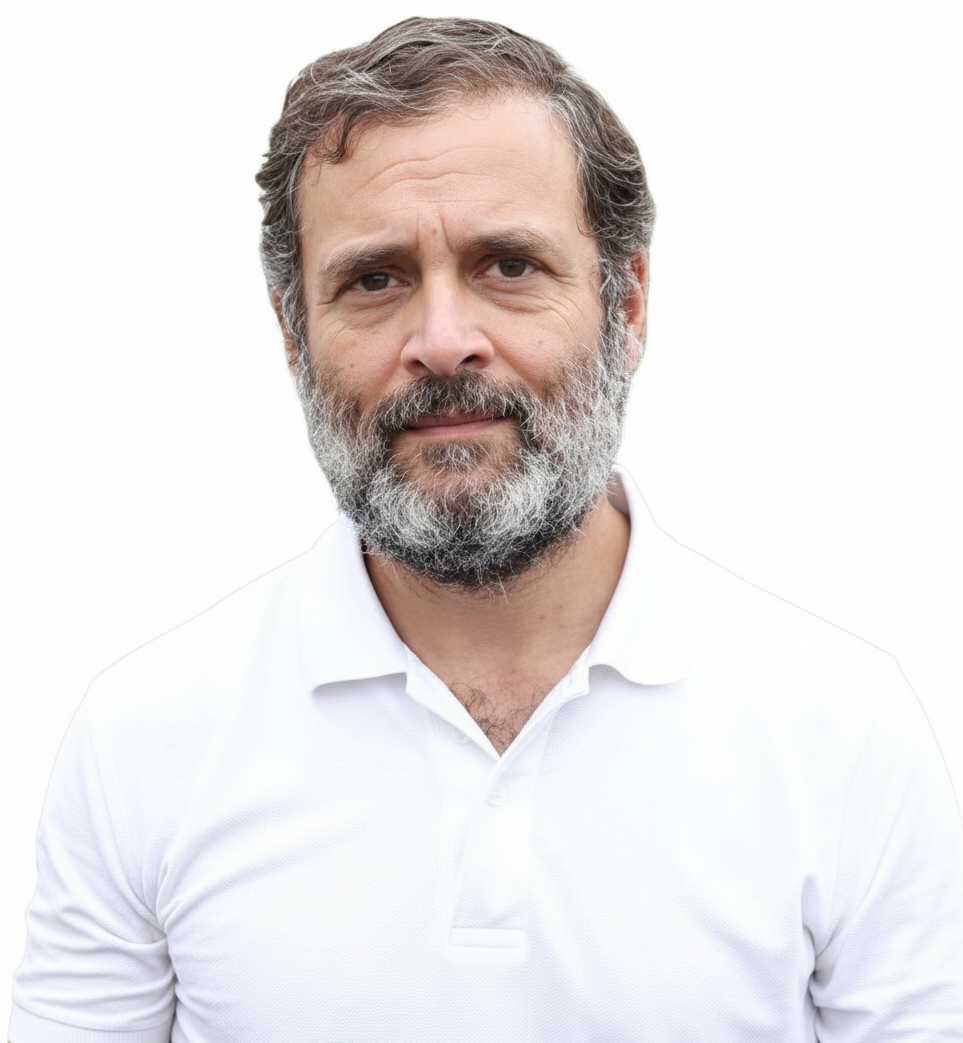
  Rahul Gandhi

=== July to December ===
- 9 July – Neil Nongkynrih, pianist and conductor (d. 2022)
- 19 July – P. Amudha, IAS officer
- 21 July – Siddhartha Mukherjee, biologist
- 22 July – Devendra Fadnavis, Politician, 18th chief minister of Maharashtra.
- 6 August – M. Night Shyamalan, Indian American writer -director.
- 16 August
  - Saif Ali Khan, actor.
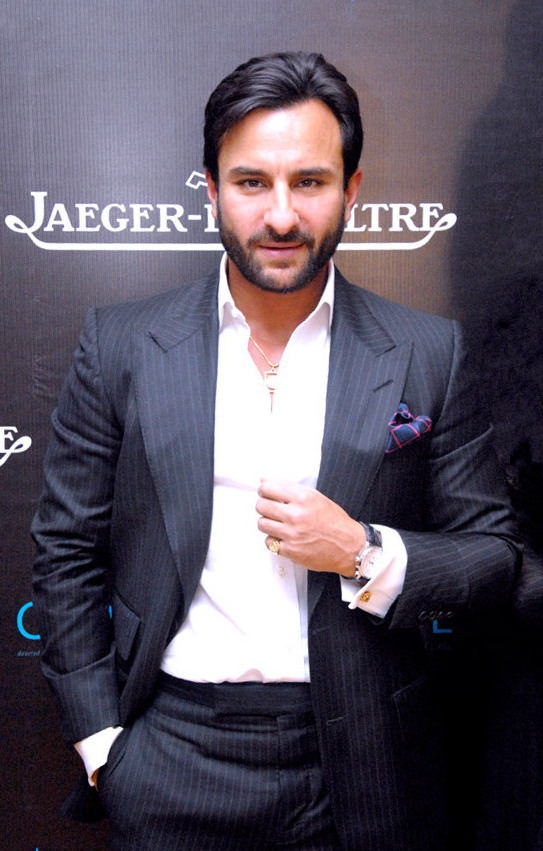
    Saif Ali Khan
  - Manisha Koirala, actress.
- 15 September – Ramya Krishnan, actress.
- 29 September – Khushbu Sundar, actress and politician.
- 10 October – Ali, actor.
- 17 October – Anil Kumble, cricketer.
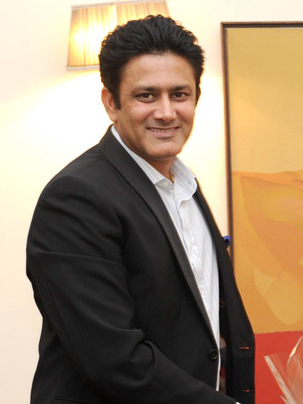
  Anil Kumble
- 17 October – Aadukalam Naren, actor.
- 23 November – Sajid Khan, film director
- 27 November – Thirumal Valavan, field hockey player.
- 12 December – Cheran, director and actor.
- 20 December – Sohail Khan, actor, producer and director.
- 25 December – Rajesh Singh Adhikari, Indian military officer. (d. 1999)
- 28 December – Sajid Khan, actor.

== Deaths ==
- 24 June – Sawai Man Singh II of Jaipur, last ruling Maharaja of Jaipur (b. 1911).
- 24 July – Peter de Noronha, businessman, philanthropist and civil servant (b. 1897).
- 21 November – C. V. Raman, physicist, awarded the 1930 Nobel Prize in Physics (b. 1888).
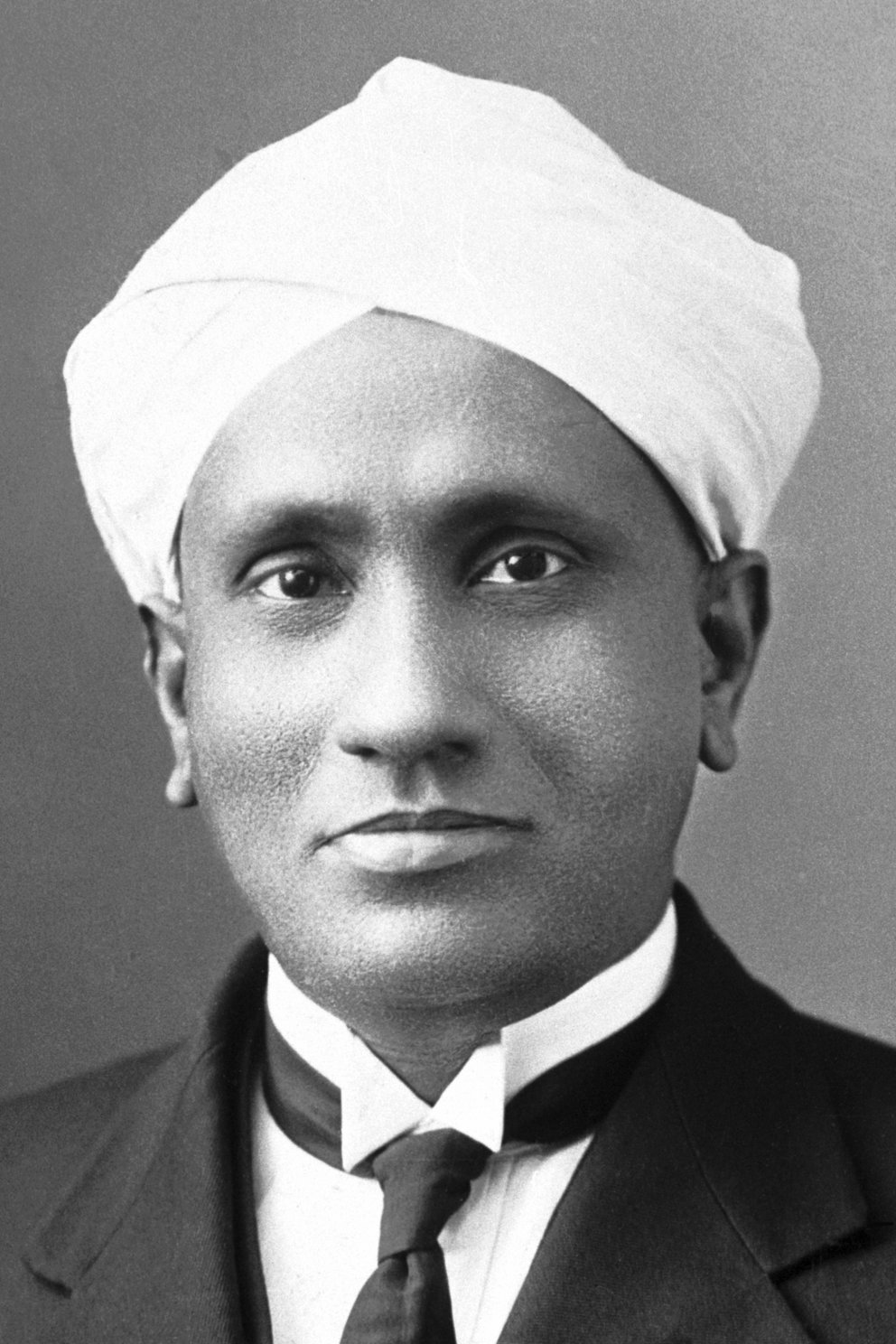
  C.V. Raman

== See also ==
- Bollywood films of 1970
