= 1974 in India =

- Centuries: 18th; 19th; 20th; 21st
- Decades: 1950s; 1960s; 1970s; 1980s; 1990s
- See also: List of years in India; Timeline of Indian history

Events in the year 1974 in the Republic of India.

== Incumbents ==
- President of India – V. V. Giri (until 24 August), Fakhruddin Ali Ahmed (after 24 August)
- Prime Minister of India – Indira Gandhi
- Vice President of India – Gopal Swarup Pathak until 30 August; B.D. Jatti
- Chief Justice of India – Ajit Nath Ray

=== Governors ===
- Andhra Pradesh – Khandubhai Kasanji Desai
- Assam – L. P. Singh
- Bihar – Ramchandra Dhondiba Bhandare
- Gujarat – Kambanthodath Kunhan Vishwanatham
- Haryana – Birendra Narayan Chakraborty
- Himachal Pradesh – S. Chakravarti
- Jammu and Kashmir – L. K. Jha
- Karnataka – Mohanlal Sukhadia
- Kerala – N. N. Wanchoo
- Madhya Pradesh – Satya Narayan Sinha
- Maharashtra – Ali Yavar Jung
- Manipur – L.P. Singh
- Meghalaya – L.P. Singh
- Nagaland – L.P. Singh
- Odisha –
  - until 20 August: Basappa Danappa Jatti
  - 21 August-25 October: Gati Krushna Misra
  - starting 25 October: Akbar Ali Khan
- Punjab – Mahendra Mohan Choudhry
- Rajasthan – Sardar Jogendra Singh
- Tamil Nadu – Kodardas Kalidas Shah
- Tripura – L. P. Singh
- Uttar Pradesh – Akbar Ali Khan (until 25 October), Marri Chenna Reddy (starting 25 October)
- West Bengal – Anthony Lancelot Dias

== Events ==
- National income - ₹793,779 million

=== January - March ===
- 3 January - A protest against 20% canteen fee hike in Lalbhai Dalpatbhai College of Engineering, Ahmedabad turns into clashes with Police and later transformed to Navnirman Andolan.
- 5 January – Worli riots occurred in the chawl in the Worli neighborhood of Mumbai. The tensions prevailed till April.
- January – May smallpox epidemic in East India.
- 19 February - Drillship Sagar Samrat struck oil at Bombay High, 160 km off the shore.
- 16 March – Navnirman Andolan (Re-construction movement) a socio-political movement started in 1973 December in Gujarat by students and middle-class against economic crisis and corruption in public life. The movement ended with the dissolution of the elected government of Chimanbhai Patel.
- 18 March – Bihar Movement started as a movement by students in Bihar led by the veteran Gandhian socialist Jayaprakash Narayan, against misrule and corruption in the Government of Bihar.
- 25 March – Gaura Devi and 27 women confronted loggers in Chamoli district in connection with Chipko movement.
- 28 March - Minister of Food and Agriculture Fakhruddin Ali Ahmed announced that Government of India has decided to scrap take over of wholesale wheat distribution.

=== April - December ===
- 8 May – A railway strike started by 1.7 million workers of Indian Railways. The strike lasted for 20 days till 27 May 1974 and was the largest recorded industrial action in the world.
- 18 May – Under project Smiling Buddha, India successfully detonates its first nuclear weapon in the Thar Desert, and becomes the sixth nation to do so.
- 28 June - Sirima–Gandhi Pact signed to solve the statelessness of Sri Lankan Tamils.
- 5 July - Colaba area of Bombay registers intense rainfall of 57.5 cms in 24 hours.
- 11–17 November - 1974 Indian Open held at Bombay.

== Births ==
- 1 January – Abha Dawesar, novelist.
- 9 January – Farhan Akhtar, actor.
- 7 January – Varun Badola, actor.
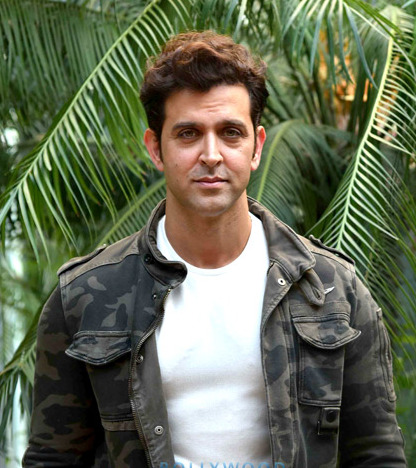
- Hrithik Roshan
  10 January – Hrithik Roshan, actor.
- 25 February – Divya Bharti, actress (died 1993).
- 28 February – Sunil (actor), actor and comedian.
- 8 March – Fardeen Khan, actor.
- 14 March – Rohit Shetty, film director.
- 22 April – Chetan Bhagat, novelist.
- 23 April – Shwetha Menon, actor.
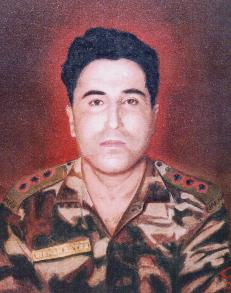
- Vikram Batra
  20 May – Shiboprosad Mukherjee, film director, writer and actor.
- 28 May – Mayur Puri, screenwriter, lyricist, actor, filmmaker.
- 30 May – Mohan Raja, film director.
- 7 June – Mahesh Bhupathi, tennis player.
- 22 June – C. Joseph Vijay, a retired actor and playback singer, is currently serving as the Chief Minister of Tamil Nadu.
- 22 June – Devayani, actress.
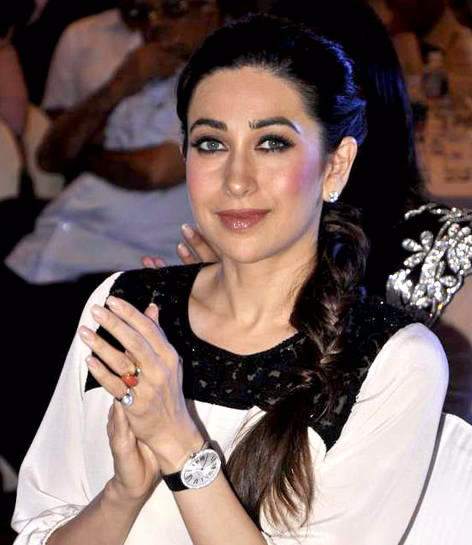
- Karishma Kapoor
  25 June – Karisma Kapoor, actress.
- 15 July – Neikezhakuo Kengurüse, kargil hero. (died 1999).
- 5 August – Kajol, actress.
- 9 September – Vikram Batra, Indian Army-KARGIL HERO. (died 1999).
- 25 September – AR Murugadoss, film director.
- 4 October- Subeer Sakssena- IT leader
- 23 October – Aravind Adiga, journalist and author, 2008 Man Booker Prize winner.

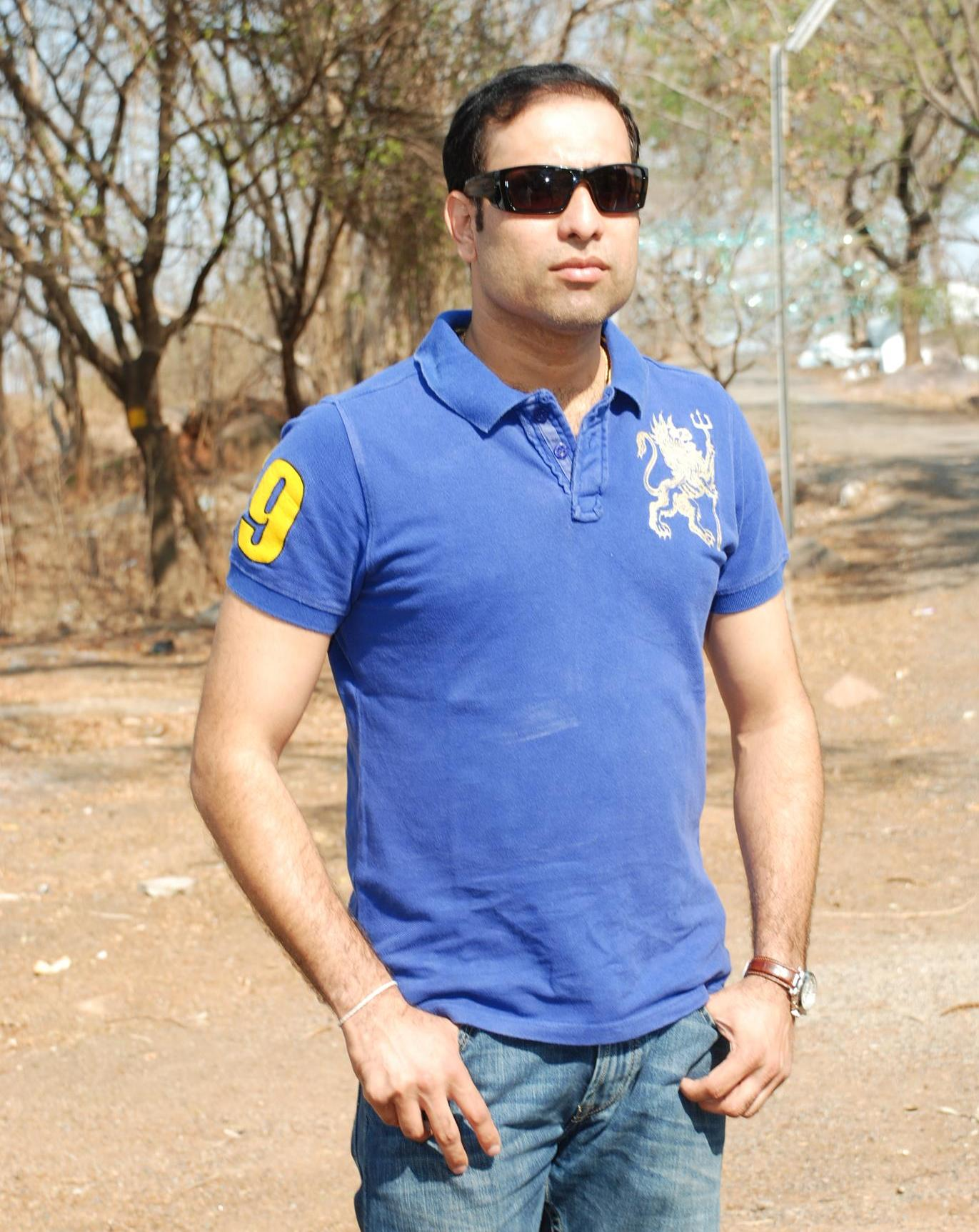
VVS Laxman

- 1 November – V. V. S. Laxman, cricketer.
- 9 November – Manav Gohil, television actor
- 19 December – MVP, Writer & Author.
- 21 December – Sanjiv Chaturvedi, Indian Forest Service officer.
- 25 December – Nagma, actress and politician.

== Deaths ==
- 2 January – Prabhas Chandra Lahiri, revolutionary, politician and writer (b. 1893).
- 4 February – Satyendra Nath Bose, physicist (b. 1894).
- 11 February – Ghantasala, Telugu Play Back Singer (b.1922).
- 23 September – Jayachamaraja Wodeyar Bahadur, last Maharaja of Mysore, philosopher, musicologist, political thinker and philanthropist (b. 1919).
- 6 October – V. K. Krishna Menon, nationalist and politician (b. 1897).
- 16 October – Chembai, Carnatic music singer (b. 1895).
- 16 October – Edasseri Govindan Nair, poet, playwright and essayist (b. 1906).
- J. P. Chandrababu, comedian-actor, singer and dancer (b. 1926).
- Kshetresa Chandra Chattopadhyaya, scholar of Sanskrit (b. 1896).
- Sucheta Kriplani, freedom fighter, politician and in Uttar Pradesh, became first woman to be elected Chief Minister of a state (b. 1908).
- Matthew Pothen Thekaekara, scientist (b. 1914).

== See also ==
- List of Bollywood films of 1974
