= 1967 in India =

- Centuries: 18th; 19th; 20th; 21st
- Decades: 1940s; 1950s; 1960s; 1970s; 1980s
- See also: List of years in India; Timeline of Indian history

Events in the year 1967 in the Republic of India.

== Incumbents ==
- President of India – Sarvepalli Radhakrishnan until 13 May, Zakir Husain
- Prime Minister of India – Indira Gandhi
- Vice President of India – Zakir Husain until 13 May; V. V. Giri
- Chief Justice of India – Koka Subba Rao (until 11 April), Kailas Nath Wanchoo (starting 11 April)

=== Governors ===
- Andhra Pradesh – Pattom A. Thanu Pillai
- Assam – Vishnu Sahay
- Bihar – M. A. S. Ayyangar (until 7 December), Nityanand Kanungo (starting 7 December)
- Gujarat –
  - until 7 December: Nityanand Kanungo
  - 7 December-26 December: P.N. Bhagwati
  - starting 26 December: Shriman Narayan
- Haryana – Dharma Vira (until 14 September), Birendra Narayan Chakraborty (starting 14 September)
- Jammu and Kashmir – Mahraja Karan Singh (until 15 May), Bhagwan Sahay (starting 15 May)
- Karnataka – V. V. Giri (until 13 May), Gopal Swarup Pathak (starting 13 May)
- Kerala – Bhagwan Sahay (until 15 May), V. Viswanathan (starting 15 May)
- Madhya Pradesh – K. Chengalaraya Reddy
- Maharashtra – P V Cherian
- Nagaland – Vishnu Sahay
- Odisha – Ajudhia Nath Khosla
- Punjab –
  - until 1 June: Dharma Vira
  - 1 June-16 October: Mehar Singh
  - starting 16 October: Dadappa Chintappa Pavate
- Rajasthan – Sampurnanand (until 16 April), Sardar Hukam Singh (starting 16 April)
- Uttar Pradesh – Bishwanath Das (until 30 April), Dr. Bezwada Gopala Reddy (starting 1 May)
- West Bengal – Padmaja Naidu (until 1 June), Dharma Vira (starting 1 June)

== Events ==
- National income - ₹376,012 million
- 16 January - Goa opinion pol/ referendum done and majority 55.48% supported the decision not to merge with Maharashtra.
- 17–21 February - 1967 Indian general election, Indian National Congress came back into power despite facing set back in various states.
- 10 March - India and Myanmar enters into a border agreement which demarcates India–Myanmar border.
- 12 May – Congress Working Committee adopted a resolution for social control of banks, nationalization of general insurance, removal of princes privileges.
- 13 May – Zakir Husain becomes the first Muslim to become president of India.
- 27 May – Naxalite insurgency: Beginning with a peasant uprising in the town of Naxalbari in West Bengal, this Maoist rebellion led by a far-left splinter group of the CPI(M) on in the Indian countryside. The guerrillas operate among the impoverished peasants, fighting both the government security forces and private paramilitary groups funded by wealthy landowners. The city of Calcutta is badly hit with Naxalite violenece, fueld by indoctrination of students. Most fighting takes place in the states of Andhra Pradesh, Maharashtra, Orissa and Madhya Pradesh.
- 23 June - Indira Gandhi announces Ten Point Program a Socialistic roadmap during All India Congress Committee meet.
- 11 September – Indian and Chinese troops begin to exchange fire at Nathu La in Sikkim. This event is known as the Nathu La and Cho La clashes
- 15 September – After a ceasefire, the clashes in Nathu La end.
- 1 October – Indian and Chinese troops clash in Cho La and the duel ended after a day.
- 1 November - Kerala State Lotteries becomes the first state to start Lottery under public sector.
- 11 December – The 6.6 M_{w} Koynanagar earthquake shook western India with a maximum Mercalli intensity of VIII (Severe), killing 177–180 and injuring 2,272.

== Law ==
- Unlawful Activities (Prevention) Act
- The Passports Act, 1967.

== Sport ==
- Prithipal Singh and Shankar Lakshman (hockey players) are awarded the Padma Shri.

== Births ==
=== January to June ===
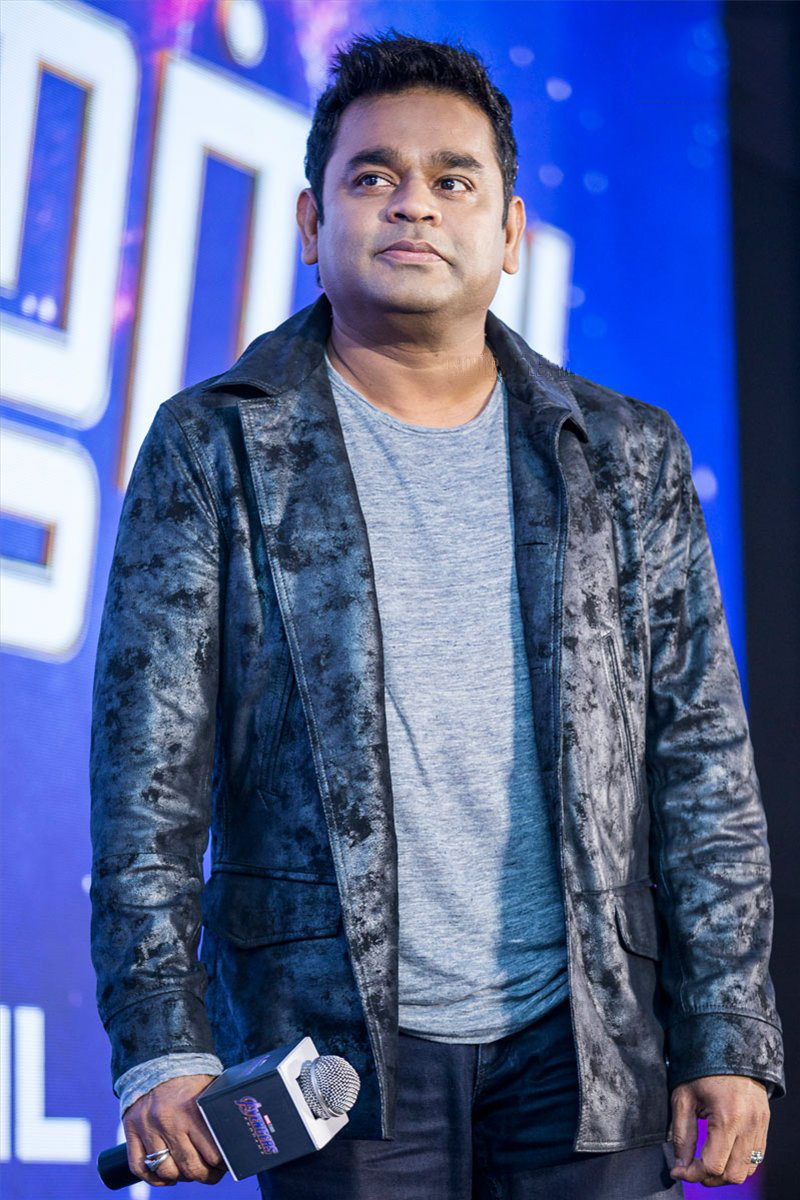
- A. R. Rahman
  6 January – A. R. Rahman, music composer and singer.
- 15 January – Bhanupriya, actress.
- 12 February – N. Ravikiran, composer of Carnatic music.
- 3 March – Shankar Mahadevan, singer.
- 16 March – Vilas Rupawate, politician.
- 15 May – Madhuri Dixit, actress.
- 23 May – Rahman, actor.
- 1 June – Anil Bhardwaj, scientist.
- 12 June – Muttamsetti Srinivasa Rao, politician and member of parliament from Anakapalli.

=== July to December ===
- 7 July – Pratyaya Amrit, IAS.
- 12 July – G. Marimuthu, film director and actor.
- 14 July – Prakash Kona, novelist, essayist and poet.
- 27 July – Rahul Bose, actor, screenwriter, film director and social activist.
- 4 August – Arbaaz Khan, actor.
- 15 August – Gurmeet Ram Rahim Singh, social group leader.
- 9 September – Akshay Kumar, actor.
- 12 September – Amala Akkineni, actress.
- 30 September – Deepti Bhatnagar, actress and television presenter.
- 13 November – Juhi Chawla, actress, film producer and television presenter.
- 14 November – N. Lingusamy, film director, screenwriter, and film producer.
- 27 November – Sanjana Kapoor, actress and theatre director.
- 17 December – Neeraj Mittal, IAS.

=== Full date unknown ===
- G. N. Saibaba, writer and human rights activist. (d. 2024)

== Deaths ==
- 22 January – Pandurang Sadashiv Khankhoje, revolutionary, scholar, agricultural scientist and historian (b. 1884).
- 9 November - Krishna Nehru Hutheesing, political activist and writer (b. 1907).
- 28 November – Senapati Bapat, Activist in the Indian Independence Movement and the Samyukta Maharashtra Movement (b. 1880)

== See also ==
- Bollywood films of 1967
