= Tamil Virtual Academy =

Indian distance learning university

- Tamil Virtual Academy
- Established: 17 February 2001; 25 years ago
- Chairman: T. Udhayachandran, IAS
- Director: R. Komahan
- Location: Chennai, Tamil Nadu, India
- Nickname: TVA
- Website: www.tamilvu.org

Tamil Virtual Academy, formerly known as the Tamil Virtual University, is a distance education institution based in Chennai, Tamil Nadu, India. The Government of Tamil Nadu established the Tamil Virtual University on 17 February 2001 as a society. The announcement was made at the closing ceremony of the Second Tamil Internet Conference in 1999 by M. Karunanidhi. The university provides internet-based educational resources and opportunities for the Tamil diaspora as well as for others interested in learning the Tamil language and acquiring knowledge of the history, art, literature and culture of the Tamils.

Tamil Virtual Academy offers certificate courses at three levels (Basic, Intermediate and Advance) and B.A. programme in Tamil. The postgraduate programme M.A. (Tamil) has been approved by Tamil University, Tanjore.

== Digital library ==
The digital library of TVU provides literature, glossaries and dictionaries. It accommodates literature starting from Sangam era to the present day, with the following features:

- Classified sections of books.
- Nigandu, Agarāthi
- Ancient and medieval literature, with their commentaries.
- Romanized versions of Tolkappiyam, Patthuppaattu and Ettutthogai.

The library has subject-indexing and search facilities.
