= M. Yoganathan =

Marimuthu Yoganathan
- Born: Marimuthu Yoganathan; 1969 (age 56–57); Coimbatore, Tamil Nadu, India
- Citizenship: Indian
- Occupations: Bus conductor, environmental activist
- Employer(s): Tamil Nadu State Transport Corporation, Coimbatore
- Known for: Tree plantation and environmental activism
- Movement: Tree plantation, environmental awareness
- Website: http://www.yogutrees.com

Marimuthu Yoganathan (born 1969), popularly known as The Tree Man, is an Indian environmental activist and bus conductor with the Tamil Nadu State Transport Corporation in Coimbatore. He is noted for his lifelong dedication to planting trees and promoting environmental awareness in Tamil Nadu.

== Life ==
Yoganathan’s interest in nature began during his youth, when he spent time writing poems under trees in the Kotagiri forests and became deeply disturbed by indiscriminate tree felling. This early experience inspired him to take up environmental protection and tree planting.

He works as a bus conductor on the S-26 route between Marudamalai and Gandhipuram in Coimbatore while pursuing his environmental mission alongside his regular job.

Yoganathan uses a significant portion of his modest salary to buy and plant saplings and educate children and young people about the importance of trees and a healthy environment. He often gives saplings free of charge to passengers and conducts interactive awareness and plantation programmes at schools, colleges and communities across Tamil Nadu.

According to recent reports, Yoganathan has now planted and nurtured more than 500,000 saplings over almost four decades of work, across the state, of which a large number have grown into mature trees. He regularly travels to educational institutions to inspire and educate young people about caring for the natural world.

== Honours ==
Yoganathan’s environmental work has earned him widespread recognition:

Invitation to a Presidential “At Home” reception on the occasion of Independence Day in recognition of his contribution to environmental protection.

Eco Warrior Award from the Government of India, presented by the Vice President.

Suttru Suzhal Sevai Veerar award conferred by the Government of Tamil Nadu.

CNN-IBN Real Heroes Award for his environmental leadership.

Praise from the Prime Minister of India Narendra Modi on the national radio programme Mann Ki Baat for his exemplary work in tree plantation and awareness.

== See also ==
Jadav Payeng

Joan Root

Dian Fossey

Ken Saro-Wiwa

Chico Mendes
