= Sangeet Verma =

Sangeet Verma (born 1971) is an Indian photographer and photojournalist. Sangeet Verma started as a writer and later became a photographer and a film maker. He has written regularly for The Organiser Weekly, a New Delhi publication. He is a freelance photographer, and works on nationalist issues. Specialist in heritage, history, ancient architecture, wild life and nature, Sangeet has created many success stories including the reintroduction of Raja Bhoj in Indian history and the reidentification of Bhopal as Bhojpal, the city of Raja Bhoj. An expert on traditional knowledge systems in India, He has also done extensive work among the tribals in the region, and his monumental work 'Heritage Satpura' is a pioneer in discovering one of the oldest civilizations in the world.

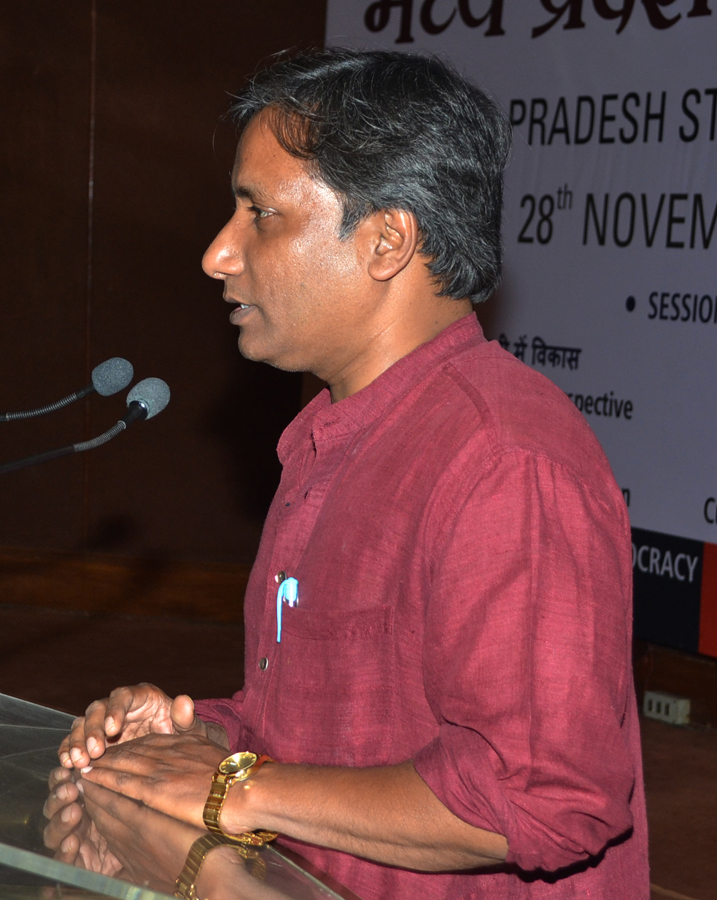
Sangeet Verma, on traditional Indian Sciences

== Works of Sangeet Verma ==
- Photographs of Bhopal heritage at National Museum of Mankind

. Documentaries : 1. 'Agaria : Lohe Ke Log' A research based film on the ancient science and skill of iron making in India

2. 'Agnishikha' : A film on the life of the great freedom fighter Rani Gaidinliu of Nagaland

3. 'Mritunjay' : A documentary on the life of ex RSS chief K. S. Sudarshan

4. 'Dharini' : A documentary on the achievements of Narendra Modi led NDA government in its first year.
