= Mamadapur, Belgaum =

Village in Karnataka, India

Mamadapur
- Village
- Location in Karnataka, India Mamadapur (India)
- Coordinates: 16.14°N 74.81°E
- Country: India
- State: Karnataka
- District: Belgaum
- Talukas: Gokak

Population (2001)
  - Total: 7,636

Languages
  - Official: Kannada
- Time zone: UTC+5:30 (IST)

Mamadapur is a village in the southern state of Karnataka, India. It is located in the Gokak taluk of Belagavi district in Karnataka. It is the birthplace of Wrangler D.C. Pavate

== Demographics ==
As of 2001 India census, Mamadapur had a population of 7,636 with 3,933 males and 3,703 females. Mamadapur village is located 15 km from Gokak city.

== See also ==
- Belgaum
- Districts of Karnataka
