= Vilas Rupawate =

Indian politician (born 1967)

Personal details
- Born: 16 March 1967 Mumbai
- Party: Shiv Sena (Uddhav Balasaheb Thackeray) (since 2023)
- Other political affiliations: Indian National Congress (2011–2017)
- Spouse: Sangita Rupawate
- Children: 2
- Occupation: Social worker
- Website: web.archive.org/web/20141218114513/http://vilasbhaurupawate.org/

Vilas Rupawate (born 16 March 1967) is an Indian politician from the state of Maharashtra. In 2011, he joined the Indian National Congress.

He became the General Secretary of the Maharashtra Pradesh Congress Committee in January 2013, Rupawate became President of Nirathar Nirashrit Vyakti Vikas Vibhag under the Maharashtra Pradesh Congress Committee on 25 September 2011.

Rupawate is founder of "Vilasbhau Rupwate Pratishthaan", which works with "Maharashtra Niraadhar Mahila Sanghatana" and "Maharashtra Devdasi Mahila Sanghatana". These organizations provide facilities for widows and devadasis. The group had organized a raasta roko protest at Kasarwadi near Pimpri-Chinchwad in June 2009.
