= Matthew Pothen Thekaekara =

Scientist and author from India

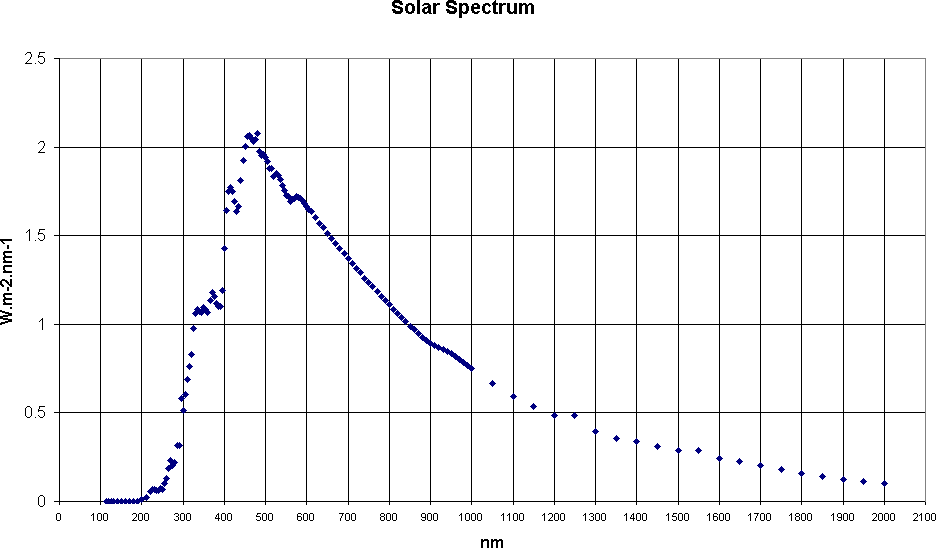
Plot of Thekaekara spectrum

Matthew Pothen Thekaekara (1914–1976) was an Indian scientist and author of books and papers relating to spectrophotometry and the solar constant besides works on theology. He was instrumental in publishing some of the earliest AM0 spectra, which is a model spectrum of the sun in space. The historic 1973 Thekaekara spectrum was the basis for ASTM E490 (American Society for Testing and Materials Standard Solar Constant and Zero Air Mass Solar Spectral Irradiance Table) from 1974 to 2000, when it was replaced by the most recent AM0 upgrade, in ASTM E490-00.

Recent publications such as a 2007 paper authored by fellow Malayali scientist P. Shahmugan made extensive reference to the Thekaekara spectrum. In 2008 a paper by authors from NASA Goddard Space Flight Center and UC Laboratory for Atmospheric and Space Physics also made extensive application of the Thekaekara spectrum.

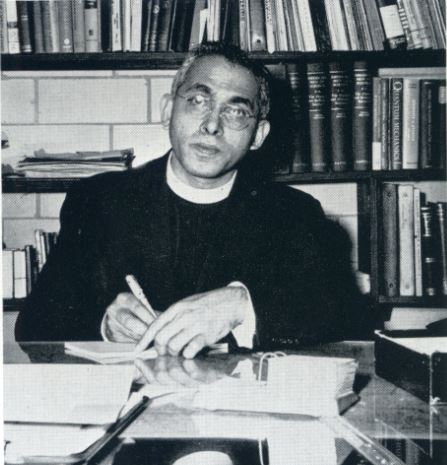

== Books ==
- The solar constant and the solar spectrum measured from a research aircraft, edited by Matthew P. Thekaekara. Solar energy. Spectrum, Solar. Aeronautics in astronomy.
- Thoughts twice dyed : reprinted from the series of "One minute meditation" / by Matthew P. Thekaekara, S.J
- "The Extraterrestrial Solar Spectrum" A.J Drummond and M.P. Thekaekara, Eds. Institute of Environmental Sciences, Mount Prospect Illinois, 1973.

== Sources ==
- http://rredc.nrel.gov/solar/spectra/am0/special.html#Thekaekara
- http://rredc.nrel.gov/solar/spectra/am0/text/Thekaekara.txt
