= Anil Kumar Awana =

Indian politician

Member of Uttar Pradesh Legislative Council
- In office MLC
- Constituency: Bulandshahar, Uttar Pradesh.

Personal details
- Born: 15 August 1968 (age 58). Village Harola, Gautam Budh Nagar, (Uttar Pradesh)
- Citizenship: India
- Party: Bahujan Samaj Party.
- Spouse: Mrs. Usha Awana
- Children: 3
- Parent(s): Mr. Narpat Singh (Father), Mrs. Pyari Devi (mother)
- Education: B.A. at Delhi University
- Profession: Agriculturist, Politician.
- Committees: Member of several committees

Anil Kumar Awana is an Indian politician who is a member of the Uttar Pradesh Legislative Council representing the Bulandshahar Local Authorities constituency. He is a member of the Bahujan Samaj Party. He belongs from a strong political family based in gautam budh nagar. His father Narpat Singh served as village head man for several years, his wife Usha Awana was zila panchayat sadasya and his brother Satish Awana was president of uttar pradesh jal nigam.
