= Siddavanahalli Krishna Sarma =

Indian author, translator and freedom fighter

Siddavanahalli Krishna Sharma (4 July 1904 – 14 October 1973) was a writer, translator, freedom fighter, journalist, social worker and educationist. He was born in the village of Doddasiddavanahalli, near Chitradurga, the third child of Rangachar & Seshamma. Throughout his life, he was an active participant in the freedom struggle, first in Hyderabad, and later in Bangalore. He identified with many activities and social movements after independence such as the Bhoodan movement.
