= T. Udhayachandran =

Service Officer

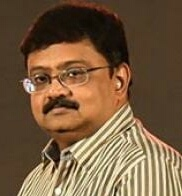
- Born: 17 May 1972 (age 54) namakkal district
- Occupation: Indian Administrative Service

T. Udhayachandran (Tamil: த. உதயச்சந்திரன்) is an Indian Administrative Service officer and Commissioner of Archaeology, Government of TamilNadu.

== Early life ==
Udhayachandran was born on 17 May 1972, in Namakkal District and graduated in BE (Electronics &Communication Engineering) from Institute of Road & Transport Technology, Erode. He belongs to 1995 batch of Indian Administrative Service and he was one of the youngest officers with age of 23 years. His interest varies from Tamil literature, contemporary history, anthropology and technology related areas.

== Career ==
When he was Collector in Erode district he initiated massive education loan scheme for students. He successfully conducted local body elections after ten years to ensure social justice in three rebel village panchayats Pappapatti, Keeripatti and Nattarmangalam in Madurai district. He was assisted by Mr.S.V.Rajasekaran, the then panchayat union Commissioner, Usilampatti, in the field level activities.

He also holds various posts in government organization including Secretary to Government (Curriculum ) School Education Department, Tamil Nadu Textbook Corporation Ltd, Tamil Nadu Water Supply and Drainage Board, Tamil Nadu Newsprint and Papers Limited, Elnet Technologies Ltd and Rural Development and Panchayat Raj Department. He also served as chairman and managing director of Tamil Nadu Small Tea Growers Industrial Cooperative Tea Factories Federation Ltd (INDCOSERVE), Coonoor.

== Corruption case against TNPSC selection ==
In 2011 when he was serving as TNPSC Secretary, he was not permitted to undertake the recruitment process by chairman and other members. He raised a complaint against it. Directorate of Vigilance and Anti-Corruption registered graft case against then TNPSC Chairman, Sellamuthu and all the 13 Members of the TNPSC following allegations. In 2012, R. Sellamuthu submitted his resignation to Governor. Later, he brought innovative schemes like Online Application System and Computer Based Test to ensure transparency in selection process.
