= Akbar Ali Khan (politician) =

Former governor of Uttar Pradesh, India

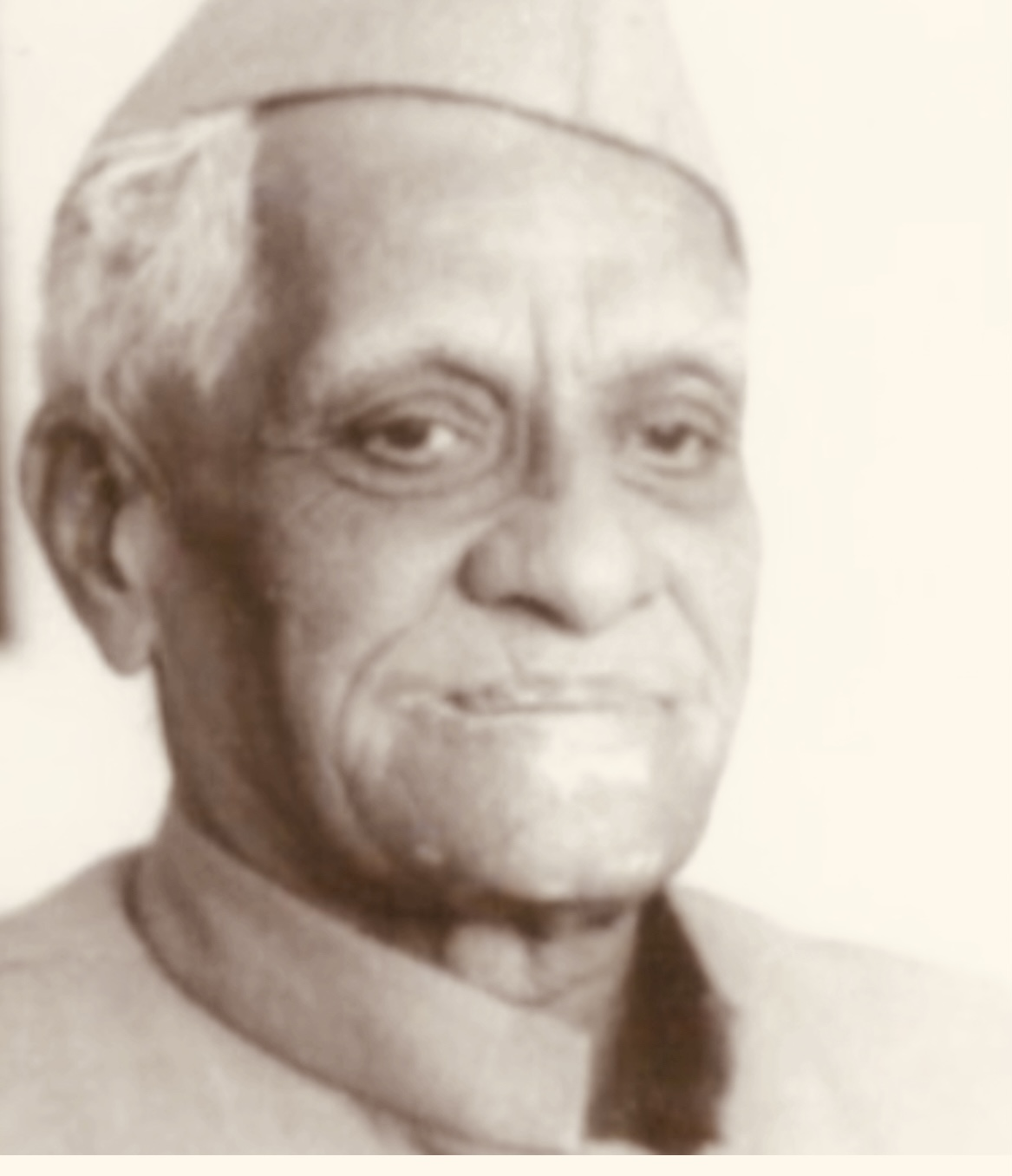
- Akbar Ali Khan Governor to UP and Odisha from Hyderabad 1972-1976

Member of Rajya Sabha
- In office 1954–1972

Governor of Uttar Pradesh
- In office 1972–1974
- Succeeded by: Marri Chenna Reddy

Governor of Odisha
- In office 25 October 1974 – 17 April 1976

Personal details
- Born: 20 November 1899 Hyderabad, Hyderabad State, British India
- Died: 1994 (aged 94–95)
- Party: Indian National Congress
- Education: Osmania University; London University
- Profession: Lawyer
- Awards: Padma Bhushan

Nawab Mir Akbar Ali Khan (20 November 1899 – 1994) was governor of Uttar Pradesh in India from 1972 to 1974 and governor of Odisha from 25 October 1974 to 17 April 1976. He was a member of the Rajya Sabha for 18 years and he was deputy chairperson of the Rajya Sabha for 12 years. He was associated with Osmania University and was a member of the Senates of Aligarh Muslim University, Jamia Millia Islamia and Jawaharlal Nehru University. Later in 1957 he founded a Polytechnic in Hyderabad.

== Early life ==
Akbar Ali Khan was born in 1899, to Mehboob Ali Khan, a jagirdar in Bidar and the commander of one of the troops of the Nizam. He received his early education in Mufid-ul-Anam High School. He joined the Aligarh Muslim University, but influenced by Gandhi, he gave up his studies to participate in the Non-cooperation movement. He later completed his B.A. in 1923 from Osmania University. Later he took LL.B. (Hons) from London University, completed barrister at law at Middle Temple, and returned in 1927 to start practice as advocate. After his return from England as barrister at law he married Karamat Unissa Begum.

== Career ==
He was included in Dasturi Islahat Commission formed in Hyderabad, and a leading member of the Bulki Movement. He also became vice-chairman of Hyderabad Municipal Council, and was member of the Osmania Graduates Association from 1952, serving as member and chairman of its Economic Committee and Exhibition Committee.

He was chairman of the United Progressive Committee for 17 years and prepared a scheme in 1939 to end Hindu-Muslim differences, presented before leaders of both sides. He did not accept the invitation of M.A. Jinnah to join Majlis-a-Iltahadul Muslamin, and did also reject the offer of Prime Ministership of Hyderabad State. In the following years he was appointed vice-chairman of Reception Committee of Indian National Congress Hyderabad in 1948, Member of Senates of Aligarh University, Jawaharlal University and James.

He started the Hyderabad Polytechnic by donating 15 acres of his land at Ramantapur, and 50000 rupees in cash. It was renamed on Jawaharlal Nehru after Nehru's death. He was also one of the founder members of the Industrial Exhibition of Hyderabad. In 1975 he collected donations in cash and kind for the establishment of the "Yusuf Baba Ward" in the Nampally Hospital. He also founded the "Old Boys Association of the Aligarh Muslim University". He used to organize help and relief for widowed women to last them for five years. He was awarded Padma Bhushan in 1965. As Governor of U.P., Ali Khan released a postage stamp in memory of Syed Ahmad Khan. He supported the demands of Telangana but opposed the demand for separation. He represented India at the United Nations Organisation. He was in the Mission to China and was also with the deputations to Moscow, Finland and other Nations of Asia, Africa and Europe. He was a Member of Rajya Sabha (Upper House of Indian Parliament) for 18 years and was its vice-chairman for a total period of 12 years. He was deputy leader of Congress Parliamentary Board.

Nawab Mir Akbar Ali Khan, a Padma Bhushan recipient, died in 1994. He had four children out of whom one is alive: Nayeem Ali Khan.
