= Jogendra Singh (politician) =

Indian politician

Sardar Jogendra Singh
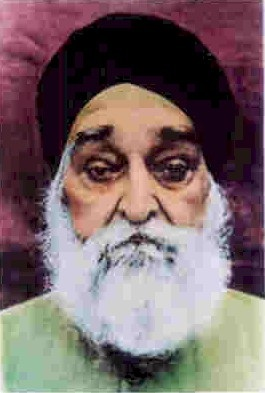

4th Governor of Rajasthan
- In office 1 July 1972 – 15 February 1977
- Preceded by: Sardar Hukam Singh
- Succeeded by: Vedpal Tyagi

Acting Governor of Odisha
- In office 20 September 1971 – 30 June 1972
- Preceded by: Shaukatullah Shah Ansari
- Succeeded by: Gati Krushna Misra

MP
- In office 5 April 1957 – 2 March 1962
- Preceded by: Rafi Ahmed Kidwai
- Succeeded by: Kunwar Ram Singh
- Constituency: Bahraich

Personal details
- Born: 3 October 1903 Bahraich
- Died: 11 February 1979 (aged 75) Bahraich
- Party: Indian National Congress
- Parent: Sardar Autaar Singh (father)
- Education: Colvin Taluqdars' College

Sardar Jogendra Singh (3 October 1903 – 11 February 1979) was an Indian politician who served as governor of Rajasthan from 1972 to 1977, and was also a member of the 2nd Lok Sabha.
