= Anthony Lancelot Dias =

Indian politician and ICS officer (1910–2002)

A. L. Dias
- Portrait of Dias

7th Governor of West Bengal
- In office 21 August 1971 – 6 November 1979
- Preceded by: Shanti Swaroop Dhavan
- Succeeded by: Tribhuvana Narayana Singh

Personal details
- Born: Anthony Lancelot Dias; 14 March 1910 Bombay, Bombay Presidency, British India
- Died: 22 September 2002 (aged 92) Mumbai, Maharashtra, India
- Occupation: Politician; ICS officer
- Awards: Padma Vibhushan (1970)

Anthony Lancelot Dias (14 March 1910 — 22 September 2002), also known as A. L. Dias was an Indian Civil Service officer and politician of Goan origin. Dias was born in Bombay and was in the Maharashtra cadre. He was awarded the Padma Vibhushan in 1970 for his management of a drought in Bihar. He also played a role in the liberation of Goa from the Portuguese rule. Dias was the Lieutenant governor of Tripura from 1969 to 1971. He was the Governor of West Bengal from 1971 to 1977.
