= D. C. Pavate =

Indian mathematician

8th Governor of Punjab
- In office 16 October 1967 – 21 May 1973
- Chief Minister: Lachhman Singh Gill; Gurnam Singh; Parkash Singh Badal; Zail Singh
- Preceded by: Mehar Singh (Acting)
- Succeeded by: Mahendra Mohan Choudhry

Personal details
- Born: 2 August 1899 Mamadapur, Belagavi District, Bombay Presidency, British India (now Karnataka, India)
- Died: 31 January 1979 (aged 78) Bangalore, Karnataka, India
- Education: M.A; B.A
- Occupation: Professor, vice-Chancellor, Politician

Dadappa Chintappa "D. C." Pavate, (2 August 1899 – 14 January 1978) was awarded Padma Bhushan from the Government of India in 1967. He was the vice-chancellor of the Karnatak university Dharwad, and the governor of Punjab. Pavate was a Cambridge Mathematical Tripos wrangler.

== Early life and education ==
Pavate was born in Mamdapur a small village next to Gokak town. His mother was Shantamma. His father was a farmer. Pavate completed primary schooling from Mamdapur and high school from Gokak. He stood first in B.A Mathematics to Rajaram College, Kolhapur of University of Mumbai then. Pavate went to Cambridge to study M.A. in mathematics and earned Mathematical Tripos Wrangler. Pavate was married to Girijabai from Salanhalli village near Gokak.

== Career ==
After returning from England, Pavate was appointed Educational Commissioner of Bombay-Karnataka. In the year 1954, he served as the third vice-chancellor of the Karnataka University, Dharwar and continued until 1967. The rapid development of the institution is credited to him. In 1967 he was nominated as the Governor of Punjab, where he served till 1973. He was cofounder and treasurer of Basava Samithi and helped in drafting the constitution of the organization in 1964. He was instrumental in setting up Basava Bhavan, near Vidhana Soudha, Bangalore. He authored two books, "My days as Governor" and "My days as educational administrator".

DC Pavate visiting scholarship has been established starting 1999 at Sidney Sussex College, Cambridge. It is awarded to outstanding graduates from Karnataka.

== Death ==
Pavate died in Bangalore on 31 January 1979 and was buried in Mamdapur, which was his birthplace.
