= V. Viswanathan =

Indian politician (1909–1987)

Venkata Viswanathan
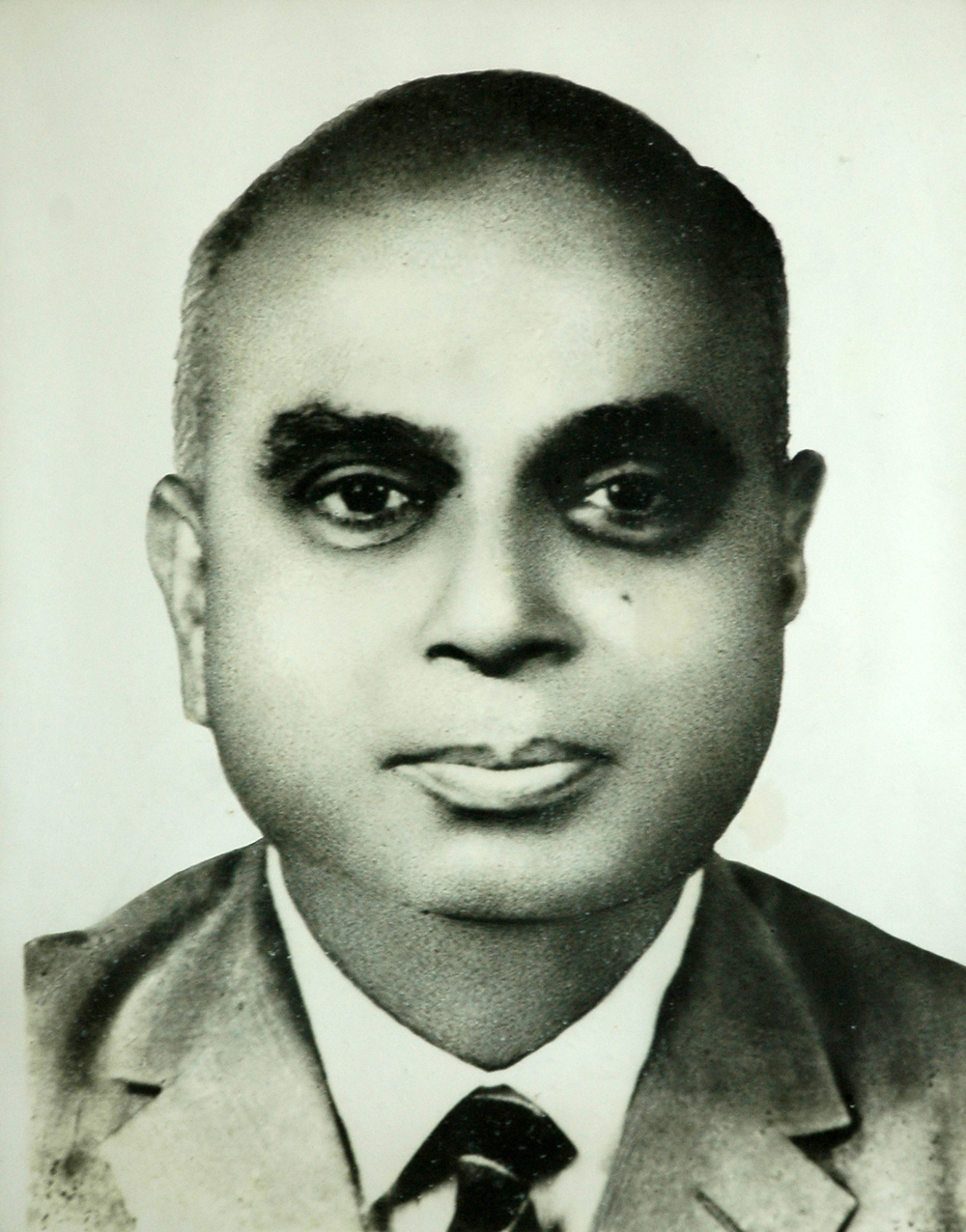

5th Governor of Kerala
- In office 15 May 1967 – 1 April 1973
- Chief Minister: E. M. S. Namboodiripad; C. Achutha Menon
- Preceded by: Bhagwan Sahay
- Succeeded by: N. N. Wanchoo

4th Lieutenant Governor of Himachal Pradesh
- In office 26 February 1966 – 6 May 1967
- Chief Minister: Yashwant Singh Parmar
- Preceded by: Bhagwan Sahay
- Succeeded by: Om Parkash

4th Chief Commissioner of Delhi
- In office 1964 – 7 September 1966
- Preceded by: Bhagwan Sahay
- Succeeded by: Aditya Nath Jha

Personal details
- Born: 25 January 1909 Thrikkadeeri, Palakkad District, Kerala, British India
- Died: 16 January 1987 (aged 77)
- Education: Central College, Bangalore, University College London, Balliol College, Oxford

Venkata Viswanathan (25 January 1909 – 16 January 1987) was an Indian ICS officer who served several gubernatorial tenures across several states. He was the Chief Commissioner of Bhopal from 1950 to 1952 and of Delhi from 1964 to 1966, the Lieutenant Governor of Himachal Pradesh from 26 February 1966 to 6 May 1967 and Governor of Kerala from 15 May 1967 to 31 March 1973.

Viswanathan hailed from Thrikkaderi in Palakkad district of Kerala and became the first Malayali to be appointed the Governor of Kerala which was unusual given the convention of not appointing a native as the Governor of his home state in India. He studied at the Central College, Bangalore, University College, London and at the Balliol College, Oxford before joining the Indian Civil Service in 1930.

Viswanathan had a reputation of being the ‘eyes and ears of Delhi’ and often took an anti-Communist line. He sparred with the then Chief Minister EMS Namboodiripad and once almost precipitated a constitutional crisis, when he prepared his own address to the Kerala Legislature. The then government rejected his draft and insisted that he read the address which the government had prepared. The Governor complied with this demand. In September 1968, Viswanathan made attempts to persuade EMS to resign.

During his tenure, EMS Namboodiripad and C Achutha Menon served as Chief Ministers. He was also a part of the five member Committee of Governors constituted by President V V Giri to look into norms, functions and powers of the Governors of States.
