= List of governors of Kerala =

List of Kerala governors

Governor of Kerala
- കേരള ഗവർണർ
- Emblem of Kerala

- Flag of India

- Incumbent; Om Prakash Mathur since 23 October 2026
- Residence: Lok Bhavan, Thiruvananthapuram, Kerala
- Appointer: President of India
- Term length: At the pleasure of the president
- Formation: 1 November 1956; 70 years ago
- Website: lokbhavan.kerala.gov.in

The Governor of Kerala is the constitutional head of state of the southern Indian state of Kerala. The governor is appointed by the President of India, and holds office at the president's pleasure. The governor is de jure head of the Government of Kerala; all its executive actions are taken in the governor's name. The elected council of ministers is headed by the Chief Minister of Kerala, who thus holds de facto executive authority in the state. The Constitution of India also empowers the governor to act upon their own discretion, such as the ability to appoint or dismiss a ministry, recommend President's rule, or reserve bills for the president's assent.

Since 23 October 2026, Om Prakash Mathur, is the 29th governor of Kerala.

== List ==
Legend

- ^{†} Died in office
- ^{§} Transferred
- ^{‡} Resigned/removed

Color key

- indicates acting/additional charge

#	Portrait	Name (born – died)	Home state	Tenure in office			Appointer (President)
#	Portrait	Name (born – died)	Home state	From	To	Time in office	Appointer (President)
1		P. S. Rao (Acting)	Andhra Pradesh	1 November 1956	21 November 1956	20 days	Rajendra Prasad
2		Burgula Ramakrishna Rao (1899–1967)	Andhra Pradesh	22 November 1956	1 July 1960^{[§]} (Note: Transferred as the Governor of Uttar Pradesh)	3 years, 222 days	Rajendra Prasad
3		V. V. Giri (1894–1980)	Madras Presidency	1 July 1960	2 April 1965^{[§]} (Note: Transferred as the Mysore)	4 years, 275 days	Rajendra Prasad
4		Ajit Prasad Jain (1902–1977)	Uttar Pradesh	2 April 1965	6 February 1966^{[‡]}	310 days	Sarvepalli Radhakrishnan
5		Bhagwan Sahay; ICS (Retd) (1905–1986)	Uttar Pradesh	6 February 1966	15 May 1967^{[§]} (Note: Transferred as the Governor of Jammu and Kashmir)	1 year, 98 days	Sarvepalli Radhakrishnan
6		V. Viswanathan; ICS (Retd) (1909–1987)	Kerala	15 May 1967	1 April 1973	5 years, 321 days	Zakir Husain
7		N. N. Wanchoo; ICS (Retd) (1910–1982)	Madhya Pradesh	1 April 1973	10 October 1977^{[§]} (Note: Transferred as the Governor of Madhya Pradesh)	4 years, 192 days	V. V. Giri
8		Jothi Venkatachalam (1917–1992)	Tamil Nadu	14 October 1977	27 October 1982	5 years, 13 days	Neelam Sanjiva Reddy
9		P. Ramachandran (1921–2001)	Tamil Nadu	27 October 1982	23 February 1988	5 years, 119 days	Zail Singh
10		Ram Dulari Sinha (1922–1994)	Bihar	23 February 1988	12 February 1990^{[‡]}	1 year, 354 days	Ramaswamy Venkataraman
11		Sarup Singh (1917–2003)	Haryana	12 February 1990	20 December 1990^{[§]} (Note: Transferred as the Governor of Gujarat)	311 days	Ramaswamy Venkataraman
12		B. Rachaiah (1922–2000)	Karnataka	20 December 1990	15 April 1995	4 years, 116 days	Ramaswamy Venkataraman
13		Gopala Ramanujam (1915–2001) (Acting)	Tamil Nadu	15 April 1995	30 April 1995	15 days	Shankar Dayal Sharma
14		B. Rachaiah (1922–2000)	Karnataka	1 May 1995	11 November 1995	194 days	Shankar Dayal Sharma
15		P. Shiv Shankar (1929–2017)	Andhra Pradesh	12 November 1995	4 May 1996^{[‡]}	171 days	Shankar Dayal Sharma
16		Khurshed Alam Khan (1919–2013) (Additional Charge)	Uttar Pradesh	5 May 1996	25 January 1997	265 days	Shankar Dayal Sharma
17		Justice (Retd); Sukhdev Singh Kang (1931–2012)	Punjab	25 January 1997	18 April 2002	5 years, 83 days	Shankar Dayal Sharma
18		Sikander Bakht (1918–2004)	National Capital Territory of Delhi	18 April 2002	23 February 2004^{[†]}	1 year, 311 days	K. R. Narayanan
19		T. N. Chaturvedi; IAS (Retd) (1928–2020) (Additional Charge)	Uttar Pradesh	25 February 2004	23 June 2004	119 days	A. P. J. Abdul Kalam
20		R. L. Bhatia (1920–2021)	Punjab	23 June 2004	10 July 2008^{[§]} (Note: Transferred as the Governor of Bihar)	4 years, 17 days	A. P. J. Abdul Kalam
21		R. S. Gavai (1929–2015)	Maharashtra	11 July 2008	7 September 2011	3 years, 58 days	Pratibha Patil
22		M. O. H. Farook (1937–2012)	Puducherry	8 September 2011	26 January 2012^{[†]}	140 days	Pratibha Patil
23		H. R. Bhardwaj (1939–2020) (Additional Charge)	Punjab	26 January 2012	22 March 2013	1 year, 55 days	Pratibha Patil
24		Nikhil Kumar; IPS (Retd) (born 1941)	Bihar	23 March 2013	5 March 2014^{[‡]} (Note: Resigned to contest in the 2014 general election)	347 days	Pranab Mukherjee
25		Sheila Dikshit (1938–2019)	National Capital Territory of Delhi	5 March 2014	5 September 2014^{[‡]}	184 days	Pranab Mukherjee
26		Justice (Retd); P. Sathasivam (born 1949)	Tamil Nadu	5 September 2014	5 September 2019	5 years, 0 days	Pranab Mukherjee
27		Arif Mohammad Khan (born 1951)	Uttar Pradesh	6 September 2019	2 January 2025^{[§]}	5 years, 118 days	Ram Nath Kovind
28		Rajendra Arlekar (born 1954)	Goa	2 January 2025	23 October 2026^{[§]} (Note: Transferred as the Governor of Tamil Nadu)	1 year, 294 days	Droupadi Murmu
29		Om Prakash Mathur (born 1952)	Rajasthan	23 October 2026	Incumbent	11 days	Droupadi Murmu

== Oath ==
Aaya njan... (Your Name) , daivanamathil prathijna cheyyunnu: njan niyamaprakaram sthabhithamadhitta Bharata ranyaghadanaye prathiyullavum, athodu thudarnnullavumaya bhakthiyum vishwasthathayum pularthumennum; njan... (Name of State) gadhapradipathyude karthavyangal vishwasthathayodu koodi nirvahikkumennum; ennil nikhshipthamaya kazhivukal upayogichu ranyaghadanaye-yum niyamathaye-yum samrakshikkumennum, paripalikkumennum, prathirodhikkumennum; athupole... (Name of State) janangngalude sevanyathilum kshemathilum njan enne-thanne samarppikkumennum prathijna cheyyunnu."

== See also ==
- Kerala
- Governors of India
- Chief Minister of Kerala
