= Shriman Narayan =

Indian politician

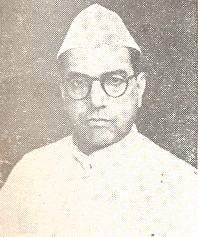

Governor of Gujarat
- In office 26 December 1967 – 16 March 1973

Personal details
- Born: 1912

Shriman Narayan (1912 - 1974) was ex-governor of the Indian state of Gujarat. He was a great supporter of the Mahatma Gandhi. He was a member of the first Lok Sabha of independent India.

He had an eminent academic career. He later undertook an educational tour and visited Hawaii, China, Japan, United States of America, Great Britain, Belgium, France, Switzerland, Germany, Austria, Czechoslovakia, Italy, Greece, Turkey and Pakistan. He was detained for 18 months during 1942 Quit India Movement. He held a number of posts in various committees, State Planning Boards, academic councils in universities, etc. Espousing the spirit of the Gandhian economic thinking, he published Gandhian Plan of Economic Development for India in 1944. The plan laid more emphasis on agriculture. For industrialization, he promoted it only to the level of promoting cottage and village-level industries, unlike the National Planning Committee (NPC) and the Bombay plan which supported a leading role for the heavy and large industries. He favoured a decentralised economic structure and self-contained villages. He also published books on poems and essays such as Fountain of Life in 1933, Roti ka Rag, etc.

Shriman Narayan Agarwal was also an author and wrote famous article "Aap bhale to jag bhala".

== See also ==
- Governors of Gujarat
