= Khandubhai Kasanji Desai =

Indian politician

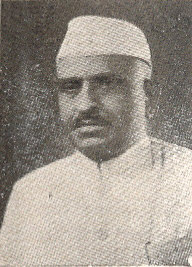

Governor of Andhra Pradesh
- In office 11 April 1968 – 25 January 1975
- Appointed by: Zakir Husain
- Chief Minister: Kasu Brahmananda Reddy; P. V. Narasimha Rao; Jalagam Vengala Rao
- Preceded by: Pattom A. Thanu Pillai
- Succeeded by: S. Obul Reddy (Acting)

Minister of Labour
- In office 10 September 1954 – 16 April 1957
- Prime Minister: Jawaharlal Nehru
- Preceded by: V. V. Giri
- Succeeded by: Gulzarilal Nanda

Personal details
- Born: 23 October 1898 Valsad, Bombay Presidency, British India (now in Gujarat)
- Died: 17 April 1975 (aged 76) Ahmedabad, Gujarat, India
- Party: Indian National Congress

Khandubhai Kasanji Desai (23 October 1898 - 17 April 1975) was an Indian politician who served as Union Minister of Labour from 1954 to 1957 and as Governor of Andhra Pradesh between 11 April 1968 until 5 January 1975.

== Life ==
Khandubhai Desai was born on 23 October 1898 in Valsad district of Gujarat. After his early education in Valsad, he was admitted to the Wilson College in Bombay (now Mumbai). But in 1920, Mahatma Gandhi came out after boycotting the college in the non-cooperation movement. Later he completed his education at Gujarat Vidyapeeth, Ahmedabad, established by Gandhiji.

Labor movement

Khandu Bhai Desai soon joined the labor movement. He took up the work of 'Mazur Mahajan', an organization of cotton mill workers of Ahmedabad. Anusuya Ben Sarabhai, Shankarlal Banker, Gulzari Lal Nanda were his colleagues. Khandu Bhai propagated the spirit of Swadeshi and self-respect of the workers. Gradually the labor union began to expand. As a result, the Indian National Trade Union Congress was established and in 1947 Khandubhai Desai was elected its first secretary.

He was also the president of this institution from 1950 to 1953. In 1950, he represented the workers of India in the 'World Labor Union'. In 1962, he was also the representative of India in the conference of independent trade unions of the world.

== Political life ==
The activities of Khandu Bhai Desai were equally important in other areas as well. In 1937, he was elected a member of the Bombay State Legislative Assembly. In 1946, he was nominated as a member of the Constituent Assembly of the country.

From 1950 to 1952 he served as a member of the Provisional Parliament. Khandubhai was elected a member of the Lok Sabha from the Mehsana-(West) parliamentary seat in the 1952 parliamentary elections as a Congress candidate.

From 1954 to 1957 he served as the Labor Minister in the central government of Jawaharlal Nehru. After this (1959 to 1966) he was a member of the Rajya Sabha.

From 11 April 1968 to 25 January 1975 he served as the 5th Governor of Andhra Pradesh. After retiring from the post of Governor, he started living in Ahmedabad, and he died on 17 April 1975.
