= Bhagwan Sahay =

Governor of Kerala and Jammu and Kashmir

Bhagwan Sahay OBE
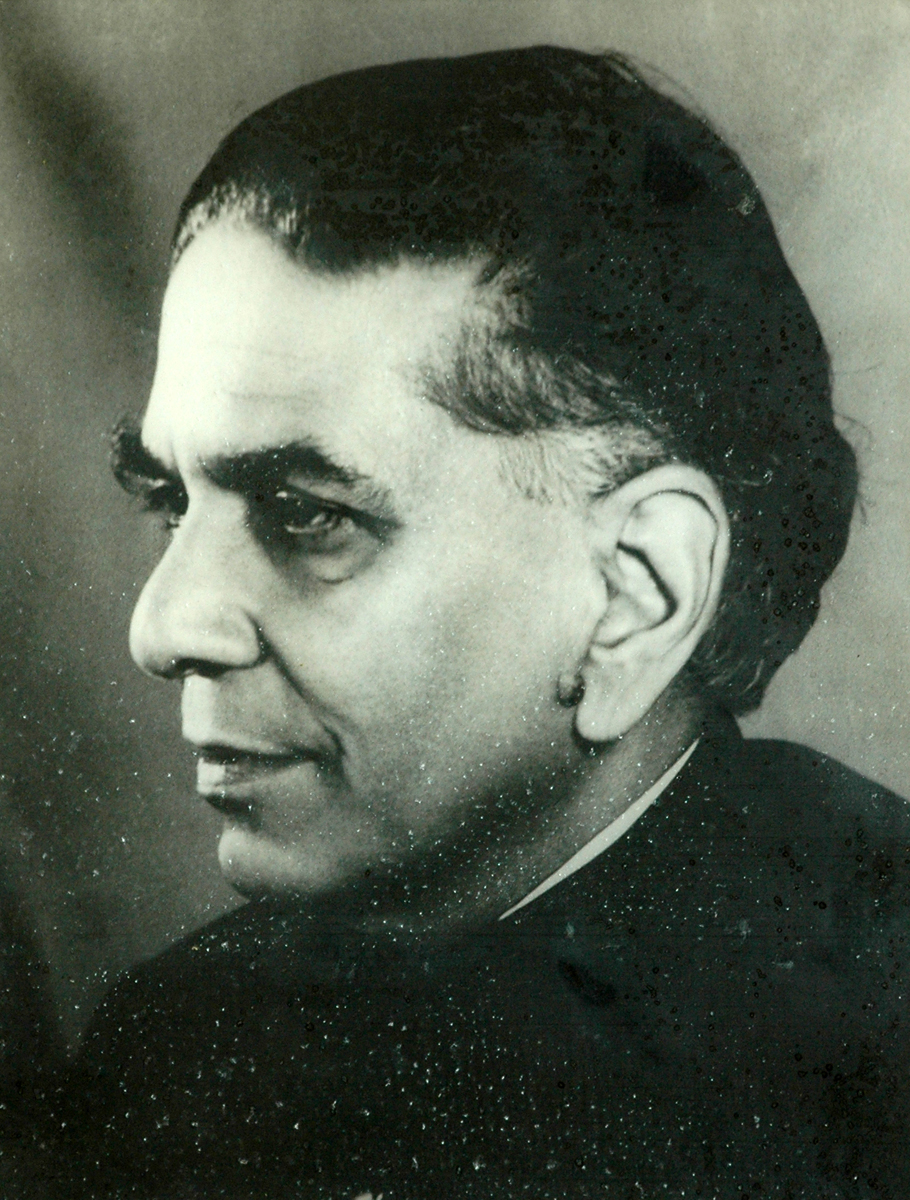

Governor of Kerala
- In office 6 February 1966 – 15 May 1967

Governor of Jammu and Kashmir
- In office 15 May 1967 – 3 July 1973

Personal details
- Born: 25 February 1905
- Died: 6 December 1986 (aged 81) New Delhi, India
- Awards: Padma Bhushan (1961)

Bhagwan Sahay (15 February 1905 – 6 December 1986) was the Governor of Kerala, India, from 6 February 1966 to 15 May 1967. Bhagwan Sahay took over as the Governor of Jammu and Kashmir on 15 May 1967 and continued till 3 July 1973. He was an ICS officer and an alumnus of the S.M College in Chandausi, Moradabad and became the second alumni of that College, after his immediate predecessor Ajit Prasad Jain, to become governor of Kerala. Before his stint in Kerala, he was also the Lieutenant Governor of Punjab. In the 1970s, under President VV Giri, a former governor of Kerala himself, he headed the committee of governors which sought to outline guidelines for constitutional heads.

He was awarded the Padma Bhushan, and was appointed an OBE in the 1945 Birthday Honours. He was the younger brother of former Assam Governor Vishnu Sahay.

Political offices
Preceded by Karan Singh	Governor of Jammu and Kashmir; 1967–1973	Succeeded by Lakshmi Kant Jha
