= Birendra Narayan Chakraborty =

Indian civil servant and politician

Birendra Narayan Chakraborty OBE ICS
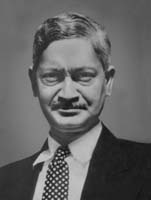

2nd Governor of Haryana
- In office 15 September 1967 – 26 March 1976
- Chief Ministers: Rao Birender Singh; Bansi Lal; Banarsi Das Gupta
- Preceded by: Dharma Vira
- Succeeded by: Ranjit Singh Narula

High Commissioner of India to Canada
- In office October 1960–July 1962
- Appointed by: Rajendra Prasad
- Preceded by: C. S. Venkatachar
- Succeeded by: C. S. Jha

High Commissioner of India to Ceylon
- In office 1955–1956
- Appointed by: Rajendra Prasad
- Preceded by: Chandulal Chunilal Desai
- Succeeded by: Y. D. Gundevia

Ambassador of India to the Netherlands
- In office 1952–1954
- Appointed by: Rajendra Prasad
- Preceded by: M.S. Mehta
- Succeeded by: B. K. Kapur

Head of the Indian Liaison Mission in Tokyo and Political Representative of India with the Supreme Commander Allied Powers in Japan
- In office 1948–1949
- Prime Minister: Jawaharlal Nehru
- Preceded by: Benegal Rama Rau
- Succeeded by: Krishna Krishna Chettur

Personal details
- Born: 20 December 1904
- Died: 26 March 1976 (aged 71) Calcutta
- Education: Scottish Church College; University of Calcutta; University College London
- Profession: Civil servant, politician

Birendra Narayan Chakraborty (also Birendra Narayan Chakravarty) (20 December 1904 – 26 March 1976) was an Indian civil servant, politician and the 2nd Governor of Haryana.

He attended Kolkata's Scottish Church College, and continued his education at the University of Calcutta. He joined University College London for a BSc in chemistry in 1926. After further studies for the Indian Civil Service examinations at the School of Oriental Studies, London, he passed the examinations in 1928 and joined the ICS in October 1929 as an assistant collector and magistrate in the Bengal Presidency.

He was promoted to joint magistrate and deputy collector in July 1930 and to additional district and sessions judge (officiating) in June 1935. In February 1936, he was promoted to full magistrate and collector, and was appointed a joint secretary with the Finance Department of the Government of Bengal in April 1944. As an acting secretary, he was appointed an Officer of the Order of the British Empire (OBE) in the 1945 Birthday Honours list.

After Indian independence, he served in many government posts. He was Indian Ambassador of Netherlands from 1952 - 1954 and high commissioner for India to the United Kingdom and Canada. Later he served as Governor of Haryana from 15 September 1967 until his death in office on 26 March 1976, aged 71.
