= List of governors of Jammu and Kashmir =

Head of Jammu and Kashmir

Lieutenant Governor of Jammu and Kashmir
- Emblem of Jammu and Kashmir

- Flag of India

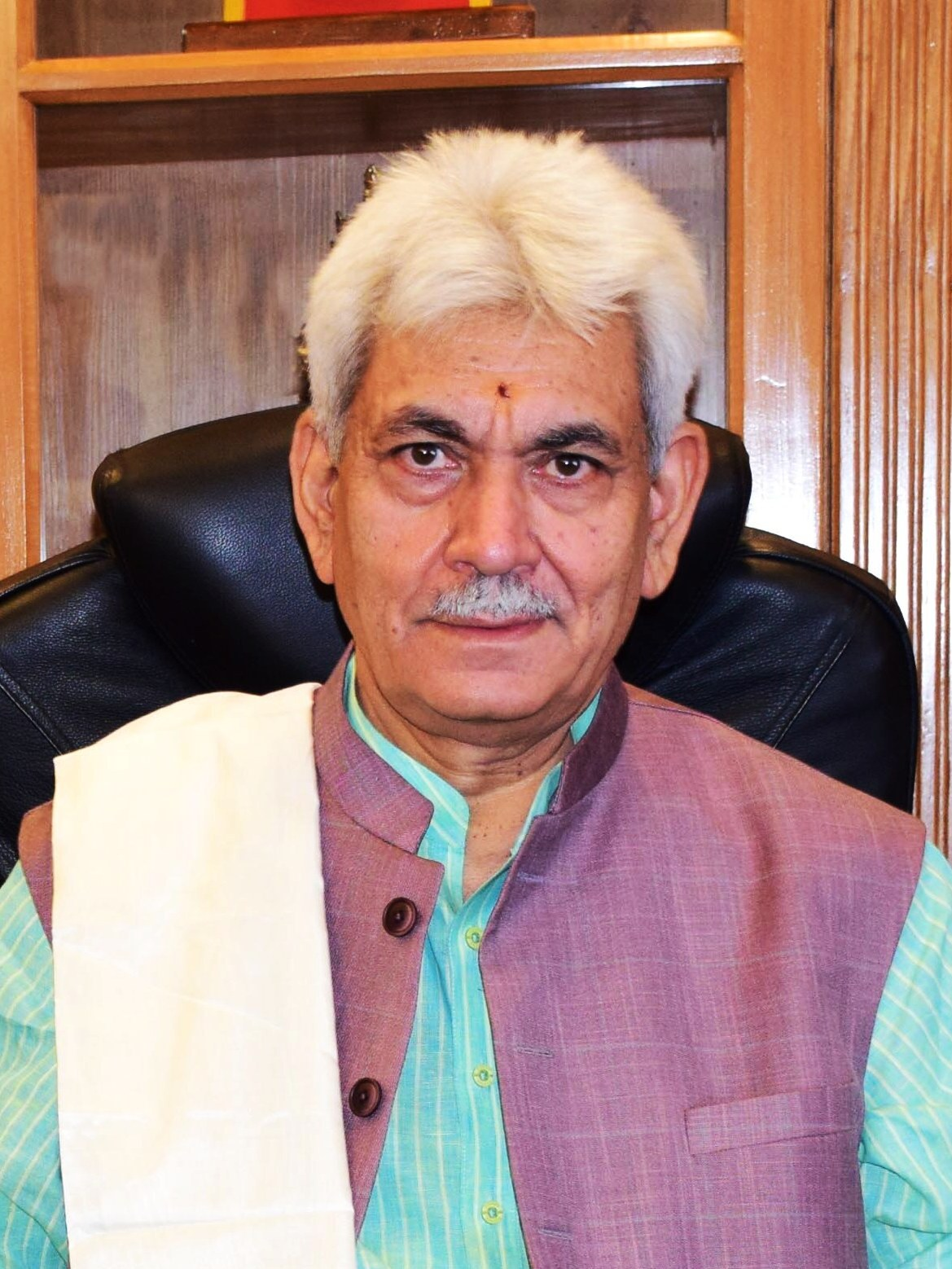
- Incumbent; Manoj Sinha since 6 August 2020
- Style: The Honourable; His Excellency
- Type: Lieutenant Governor
- Status: Head of State
- Appointer: President of India
- Term length: Five Years
- Inaugural holder: G. C. Murmu
- Formation: 31 October 2019; 6 years ago

The governor of Jammu and Kashmir was the head of the Indian state of Jammu and Kashmir.

When India became independent, Hari Singh was the Maharaja of the Princely State of Jammu and Kashmir. Technically he remained so until 17 November 1952, although from 20 June 1949 his son Karan Singh acted as regent. From 17 November 1952 to 30 March 1965, Karan Singh served as the Sadar-i-Riyasat of the State of Jammu and Kashmir. On 30 March 1965, Karan Singh became the first governor of Jammu and Kashmir.

The office of governor was abolished after the Jammu and Kashmir Reorganisation Act, 2019 was passed in August 2019 in the Parliament of India, reorganising the state of Jammu and Kashmir into two union territories, Jammu and Kashmir and Ladakh, on 31 October 2019. Provisions contained within the act created the positions of Lieutenant Governor of Jammu and Kashmir and Lieutenant Governor of Ladakh.

== Predecessor ==
=== List of rulers of Jammu and Kashmir ===
This is a list of rulers of State of Jammu and Kashmir from 1846 to 1952 CE.

Ruler	Portrait	Reign
Maharaja Gulab Singh		16 March 1846 – 20 February 1856
Maharaja Ranbir Singh		20 February 1856 – 12 September 1885
Maharaja Pratap Singh		12 September 1885 – 23 September 1925
Maharaja Hari Singh		12 September 1925 – 17 November 1952 (Note: Monarchy abolished.)

=== Sadar-i-Riyasat of Jammu and Kashmir ===
#	Name (born – died)	Term of office			Ref
#	Name (born – died)	Took office	Left office	Time in office	Ref
1	Karan Singh (b.1931)	17 November 1952	30 March 1965	13 years, 133 days	

== Governors (1965-2019) ==
Jammu and Kashmir had governors from 30 March 1965 to 31 October 2019, making a total of 54 years, 215 days.

Legend

- ^{†} Died in office
- ^{§} Transferred
- ^{‡} Resigned/removed

Color key

- indicates acting/additional charge

#	Portrait	Name (born – died)	Home state	Tenure in office			Appointer (President)
#	Portrait	Name (born – died)	Home state	From	To	Time in office	Appointer (President)
1		Karan Singh (born 1931)	Jammu and Kashmir	30 March 1965	15 May 1967	2 years, 46 days	Sarvepalli Radhakrishnan
2		Bhagwan Sahay; ICS (Retd) (1905–1986)	Uttar Pradesh	15 May 1967	3 July 1973	6 years, 49 days	Zakir Husain
3		Lakshmi Kant Jha; ICS (Retd) (1913–1988)	Bihar	3 July 1973	22 February 1981	7 years, 234 days	V. V. Giri
4		Braj Kumar Nehru; ICS (Retd) (1909–2001)	Uttar Pradesh	22 February 1981	26 April 1984^{[§]} (Note: Transferred as the Governor of Gujarat)	3 years, 64 days	Neelam Sanjiva Reddy
5		Jagmohan (1927–2021)	Delhi	26 April 1984	11 July 1989	5 years, 76 days	Zail Singh
6		General; K. V. Krishna Rao (Retd); PVSM (1923–2016)	Andhra Pradesh	11 July 1989	19 January 1990^{[‡]}	192 days	Ramaswamy Venkataraman
7		Jagmohan (1927–2021)	Delhi	19 January 1990	26 May 1990^{[‡]}	127 days	Ramaswamy Venkataraman
8		Girish Chandra Saxena; IPS (Retd) (1928–2017)	Uttar Pradesh	26 May 1990	12 March 1993^{[‡]}	2 years, 290 days	Ramaswamy Venkataraman
9		General; K. V. Krishna Rao (Retd); PVSM (1923–2016)	Andhra Pradesh	12 March 1993	2 May 1998	5 years, 51 days	Shankar Dayal Sharma
10		Girish Chandra Saxena; IPS (Retd) (1928–2017)	Uttar Pradesh	2 May 1998	4 June 2003	5 years, 33 days	K. R. Narayanan
11		Lieutenant General; Srinivas Kumar Sinha (Retd); PVSM ADC (1926–2016)	Bihar	4 June 2003	25 June 2008	5 years, 21 days	A. P. J. Abdul Kalam
12		Narinder Nath Vohra; IAS (Retd) (born 1936)	Punjab	25 June 2008	23 August 2018	10 years, 59 days	Pratibha Patil
13		Satya Pal Malik (1946–2025)	Uttar Pradesh	23 August 2018	31 October 2019	1 year, 69 days	Ram Nath Kovind

== Lieutenant governors (2019-present) ==
On 31 October 2019, this state was made a union territory. The union territory of Ladakh was carved out from the same the same day.

Legend

- ^{†} Died in office
- ^{§} Transferred
- ^{‡} Resigned/removed

Color key

- indicates acting/additional charge

#	Portrait	Name (born – died)	Home state	Tenure in office			Appointer (President)
#	Portrait	Name (born – died)	Home state	From	To	Time in office	Appointer (President)
1		Girish Chandra Murmu; IAS (Retd) (born 1959)	Odisha	31 October 2019	6 August 2020^{[‡]} (Note: Resigned to become the Comptroller and Auditor General of India)	280 days	Ram Nath Kovind
2		Manoj Sinha (born 1959)	Uttar Pradesh	7 August 2020	Incumbent	6 years, 83 days	Ram Nath Kovind

== Oath ==
"I, A. B., do swear in the name of God/solemly affirm that I will faithfully execute the office of Lieutenant Governor (or discharge the functions of the Lieutenant Governor) of [Jammu and Kashmir] and will to the best of my ability preserve, protect and defend the Constitution and the law and that I will devote myself to the service and well-being of the people of [the Jammu and Kashmir] Territory)."

== See also ==
- Governors in India
- Chief Minister of Jammu and Kashmir
- Lieutenant Governor of Ladakh
- List of current Indian lieutenant governors and administrators
