= Conservatism in India =

Conservative-oriented political parties in India have included the Bharatiya Janata Party and the Uttar Pradesh Praja Party. The Sangh Parivar is the largest group of Conservative organizations in India, including the Bharatiya Janata Party, the Vishva Hindu Parishad, and the Rashtriya Swayamsevak Sangh.

A Pew research survey conducted between late 2019 and early 2020 found that India is a largely conservative country.

== History ==
=== National level ===
==== 19th century: Rise of modern conservatism ====
Modern Indian conservatism arose as a reaction to colonialism under European powers and the subsequent loss of sovereignty and political power - it harkened back to a glorious Hindu (yet secular) past before the time of foreign invasions. Social and cultural changes laid the groundwork for Hindu revivalism as well as traditionalism.

==== Establishment of early political organisations ====
All-India Muslim League was a political party formed as a response to Hindu opposition (supported by Indian National Congress) to the Bengal partition of 1905. It aimed to safeguard the interests of Muslims. This along with the creation of a separate Muslim electorate under Morley-Minto reforms in 1909 consolidated the Hindu Right, resulting in formation of the Hindu Mahasabha. Later Rashtriya Swayamsevak Sangh(RSS) was started by Keshav Baliram Hedgewar after the participation of INC in the Khilafat Movement.

==== Conservatism in Congress party ====
Conservatism manifested under the aegis of Indian National Congress as well in early to mid 20th century. This tendency subsided gradually over time as conservative factions started breaking away from the party one by one.

Soon after independence, conservatives in the cabinet convinced the social democrat Nehru to quash communist uprisings in parts of the country. But after 1950, the conservative movement was in trouble. Patel died by then, Prominent right-leaning figures in the party were demoted to ceremonial posts or forced out or stepped aside, leaving Nehru as the most powerful leader for the time being. The conservative caucus, which included leaders like G. B. Pant (from U.P.) and B.C. Roy (from W.B.) tried to dissuade Nehru from the most extreme policies with only limited success. Indira Gandhi started her Prime ministerial tenure with devaluation of rupee but failed to follow this up with other pragmatic measures like elimination of industrial licensing. This did not help and she turned to a leftwing economic policy afterwards.

==== Splits from Indian National Congress and formation of Jan Sangh ====
Akhil Bharatiya Hindu Mahasabha was established as a political party in 1933. Madan Mohan Malaviya along with Madhav Shrihari Aney split away from the party in 1934 in protest of the Communal Award (announced in 1932). They began Congress Nationalist Party afterwards.

Syama Prasad Mukherjee started Bharatiya Jan Sangh in 1951 as a nationalistic alternative to Congress after he left Hindu Maha Sabha. The party platform included banning cow slaughter and abolishing the special status given to Jammu and Kashmir. The party was able to form coalition governments after the assembly elections of 1967 in states including Madhya Pradesh, Bihar and Uttar Pradesh. The Swatantra party was formed by right-leaning congress members in response to the socialistic turn of INC after the Nagpur resolution of 1959. They stood for free markets and dismantling of dirigiste policies prevalent at the time.

In 1967, Charan Singh left the Congress party with a host of MLAs to form Bharatiya Kranti Dal after fallout with the party over concerns about farm sector and went on to become Chief Minister.

Later another conservative faction known as the Indian National Congress (Organisation) also split from INC in 1969 due to the left-wing economic policies of Indira Gandhi, like bank nationalisations.

The Swatantra party later merged into Bharatiya Lok Dal in 1974.

Conservative political parties had very limited success in the national arena even in the late 1970s.

==== 1977-1980: Interregnum between Indira governments and Janata Party rule ====
Congress(O) and Jan Sangh merged into the Janata Party in 1977. The big tent arrangement led to a government whose foreign policy led India towards closer relations with the United States, but it also caused the exit of several multinational companies from the Indian market due to economic nationalism under the Janata rule.

The former Jan Sangh contributed largest number of seats to Janata Party's contingent with 93 seats (31% of the Janata Party seats). The previous leader of Jan Sangh, A.B. Vajpayee, was appointed the Minister of External Affairs.

The national leadership of the former Jan Sangh attempted to integrate with the Janata Party but assimilation proved to be a failure since the state and local units retained strong association with RSS. The moderate constituents of Janata Party demanded that they break the connection and revoke dual membership in both RSS and Janata Party. Eventually the coalition rule collapsed due to infighting among members of different ideologies and subsequent economic deterioration. After defeat in the 1980 elections, the party executive council finally banned dual membership to RSS in April of that year. This led to the former Jan Sangh members leaving to create a new party, the Bharatiya Janata Party.

==== 1980-1998: Emergence of BJP and ascent to power ====
The electoral misfortune of political conservatism changed with the formation of the Bharatiya Janata Party and its later adoption of the Ram Janmabhoomi campaign which ultimately resulted in BJP going from two seats in 1984 to leading government at the central level in 1996 and 1998.

Vajpayee was named the first president of the party, the bulk of which was identical in rank and file to its predecessor, the Jan Sangh.

The party initially had a moderate agenda in contrast to the Jan Sangh and focused on Gandhian socialism and emphasised its earlier links with Janata Party to gain wider appeal. However, the Congress Party, riding on a sympathy wave after the assassination of Indira Gandhi, won a landslide victory in the 1984 election.

Subsequently, the party traded the moderate agenda for a more aggressive Hindu nationalist program under the leadership of L.K. Advani from 1984 onwards.

The party backed the construction of Ram temple in Ayodhya and made it their electoral plank. By 1989 elections, they secured 86 seats, providing crucial support to V. P. Singh's government. Journalist A.S.Abraham wrote on the Times of India (March 3, 1990) that the Lok Sabha elections revealed a significant shift of political central ground to right. He believed that the recent socioeconomic disparities among people were benefitting BJP rather than the Left parties.
BJP support for Singh's government was later withdrawn after Hindu religious volunteers called Kar Sevaks were killed while fighting with paramilitary forces guarding Babri Mosque (which is on the disputed site).

Fresh elections ensued and BJP raised its tally to 120 seats and won a majority in the Uttar Pradesh assembly. RSS and its affiliates called for a massive rally at the site of the Babri mosque on December 6, 1992. The rally later gave way to violence and led to the destruction of the mosque. Riots occurred between Hindus and Muslims resulting in over 2,000 deaths. BJP was able to capitalise on the heightened communal polarisation and further increased its strength to 161 seats in the Lok Sabha. Vajpayee was sworn in as Prime Minister as he was the leader of the largest party. However, he couldn't muster majority and stepped down after 13 days.

A coalition of regional parties took over the government but lasted only for two years. BJP fought 1998 elections leading the National Democratic Alliance (NDA) coalition. Vajpayee returned as Prime Minister after gaining outside support from the Telugu Desam Party (TDP). The coalition later lost majority after All India Anna Dravida Munnetra Kazhagam (AIADMK) withdrew support in May 1999.

==== 1999-2004: First full term by non-Congress-led government ====
BJP retained power after the success of Kargil war in 1999 elections but lost 2004 polls in spite of its India shining campaign.

RSS was the ideological mentor of BJP but Vajpayee couldn't push key issues like building Ram temple (in Ayodhya), Abrogation of Article 370 (in Kashmir), implementing Uniform Civil Code (for adherents of all religions) since his government was dependent upon coalition support. As a result, there were reports in January 2000 that hard-line BJP leaders along with RSS were threatening to restart Jan Sangh, the predecessor of BJP.
In December 1999, terrorists hijacked Indian Airlines IC 814 flight from Kathmandu to New Delhi. The government later accepted their demands to exchange terrorists in prison for the passengers. Two years later, a group of terrorists stormed the Parliament building in Delhi and killed several security guards before being stopped. The Prevention of Terrorism Act, 2002 was subsequently passed in March 2002.
Prior to May 2001, NDA was holding power in 16 of 30 assemblies, including union territories. After two rounds of state elections, in February 2002, the situation reversed with Congress and its allies now holding power in 16 assemblies while NDA shrunk to seven.
Vishva Hindu Parishad held the government in a standoff between December 2001 and March 2002 by trying to perform a foundation stone laying ceremony at Ayodhya. The ceremony was later moved to a location a kilometer away and thus ended without further incidents. However Vajpayee was later accused of doing nothing to stop violence during the 2002 Gujarat riots. He reportedly wanted to remove the then-CM of Gujarat, Narendra Modi but decided against doing so after party members discouraged him. Vajpayee later admitted that the situation was mishandled and that not removing Modi was a mistake.

During late 2002 and 2003, the government pushed through economic reforms, increasing privatisation, foreign investment and modernisation programmes. This resulted in GDP growth exceeding 7% between the years 2003 and 2007.

==== 2004-2014: In opposition wilderness at national level ====
Vajpayee called for general election six months ahead of schedule. NDA suffered an unexpected defeat (186 seats vs 222 for Congress and its allies). Failure to reach out to rural Indians and a divisive agenda was blamed for the defeat.

Vajpayee retired from active politics after the 2004 defeat and appointed L. K. Advani to lead the party. In December 2005, Advani stepped down as party president and Rajnath Singh was elected in his place. On 10 December 2007, the Parliamentary Board of BJP formally announced that L. K. Advani as its prime ministerial candidate for the general elections in 2009. Although he won his 6th term as MP, NDA lost again. Sushma Swaraj was named as Leader of the Opposition. She retained this position until May 2014 when, in the 2014 Indian general election, BJP won a major victory.

In May 2008, BJP won the state elections in Karnataka-the first time the party won assembly elections in any South Indian state. But in the 2009 general elections, its strength in the Lok Sabha was reduced to 116 seats. The party went on to lose the Karnataka assembly election in 2013.

==== 2014-present: Resurgence under Modi ====
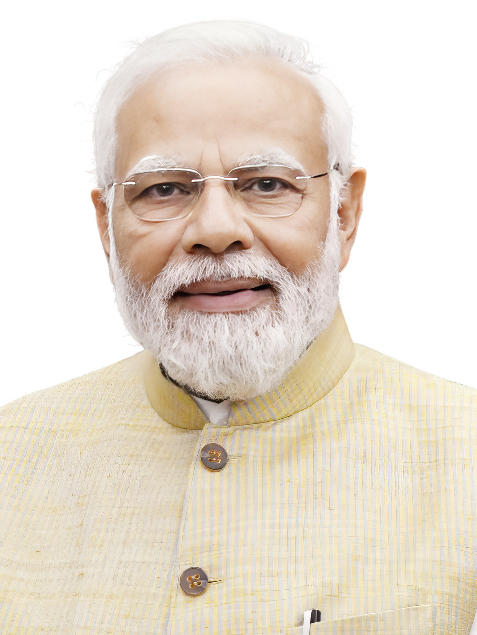
Official portrait of Narendra Modi

Later BJP returned to power with larger mandates in the 2014 and 2019 elections with Narendra Modi as the leader and lead the 2024 elections as well with 240 seats on its own. Modi went on to take oath as the Prime Minister for a third time.

BJP won 282 seats in the 2014 Indian general election, leading the NDA to a tally of 336 seats. Narendra Modi was sworn in as the prime minister of India on 26 May 2014. The vote share of the BJP was 31% of all votes cast. This was the first instance since 1984 of a single party achieving an outright majority in the Indian Parliament. The reasons suggested for this included Modi's popularity and decline in support for Congress due to corruption scandals in the previous years while the BJP was also able to expand its traditionally upper-caste, upper-class support base receiving significant support from middle-class and Dalits, as well as among Other Backward Classes.

Under Modi's rule, further privatization and liberalisation (especially foreign direct investment) was carried out. Labour law reforms were also passed, even while Modi refused to sign a trade agreement in July 2014 permitting WTO to implement a deal agreed in Bali, citing lack of both bargaining power and protection to Indian farmers as well as needs of food security. Make in India initiative was launched in September 2014 to boost local manufacturing and jobs. In October 2014, the government deregulated diesel prices, Modi continued the previous INC administration's policy of increasing military spending every year, announcing an increase of 11% in the military budget in 2015. On 29 September 2016, the Indian Army stated that it had conducted a surgical strike on terror launchpads in PoK.

Railway budget was merged into the Union Budget of India-the date of presenting the budget was moved from 28 to 1 February and the financial cycle was changed from July to April. Further, the artificial distinction between planned and non-planned expenditure was removed. Foreign Investment Promotion Board (FIPB), considered as a hurdle for FDI, was scrapped by the Modi government. Also, 2017 unemployment was at a 45-year high level after demonetisation in 2016 and implementation of GST from July 1, 2017. Income inequality increased, even while the economy grew at rate of 7.23% for the first four years in comparison to 6.39% during previous 4 years under UPA rule.

The Lok Sabha passed Muslim Women Bill 2017 on 28 December 2017. The act criminalises instant triple talaq with up to 3 years of jail time for the husband. It was reintroduced on 21 June 2019 and passed by both houses by 30 July, receiving assent from President on the next day. The act had retrospective effect from 19 September 2018.

On 8 January 2019, lower house of parliament approved a bill that would grant residency and citizenship rights to non-Muslim immigrants who entered the country before 2014 – including Hindus, Sikhs, Buddhists, Jains, Parsis and Christians from three Muslim-majority countries (Bangladesh, Pakistan and Afghanistan) – and make them eligible for Indian citizenship while excluding Muslims.

In response to the Pulwama terror attack, jets of the Indian Air Force struck terrorist bases in Pakistan on 26 February 2019.

On 6 August 2019, the Supreme Court of India passed a resolution on creation of Ram temple on disputed site of Ayodhya. Modi laid the foundation for the temple a year later.

=== State & regional level ===
Shiromani Akali Dal was formed in 1920 as a vehicle for Sikh conservatism in Punjab.

All India Majlis-e-Ittehadul Muslimeen was founded in Hyderabad in 1927 as a party which wanted setting up of a separate dominion instead of integration with India.

Indian Union Muslim League is the successor of All-India Muslim League in post-independence India. Its first council was held on 10 March 1948 in Madras (now Chennai), adopting a constitution on 1 September 1951. The party is primarily active in Kerala.

Uttar Pradesh Praja Party was formed in the state of Uttar Pradesh to oppose the abolition of the zamindari system on April 5–6, 1951. But the party soon disappeared after 1951-52 Lok Sabha elections.

On 19 June 1966, Mumbai-based cartoonist Bal Thackeray founded Shiv Sena as a Marathi nativist organisation.

== Current situation ==
Even though BJP had to contend with loss of majority on its own in the 2024 general election, it still retained its government. It also won the Haryana Legislative election in the same year. Several exit polls predicted a loss for BJP but the party went on to win the state for a third term. This was the 11th state where they beat anti-incumbency. For comparison, the opposition Congress had failed to get re-elected in any state for the past decade. The BJP also won by a landslide in Maharashtra in the same year, becoming the first party since INC in 1971 to be re-elected for a third consecutive time in the state. BJP stormed back to power in Delhi in 2025 and won in a landslide in Bihar. BJP won West Bengal, Assam and Pudducherry in a landslide

== List of conservative parties ==
=== Active ===
- Bharatiya Janata Party
- Hindu Mahasabha
- Maharashtra Navnirman Sena
- Shiv Sena
- Shiv Sena (Uddhav Balasaheb Thackeray)
- All India Majlis-e-Ittehadul Muslimeen
- Indian Union Muslim League
- All India United Democratic Front
- Shiromani Akali Dal
- Naga People's Front

=== Defunct ===
- All-India Muslim League
- Unionist Party (Punjab)
- Uttar Pradesh Praja Party
- Congress Nationalist Party
- Akhil Bharatiya Ram Rajya Parishad
- Bharatiya Jana Sangh
- Swatantra Party
- Bharatiya Kranti Dal
- Indian National Congress (Organisation)
- Bharatiya Janshakti Party
- Balasahebanchi Shiv Sena

== See also ==
- Liberalism in India
- Socialism in India
- Indian nationalism
- Hindu nationalism

== Sources ==
- "Narendra Modi sworn in as Indian prime minister". BBC News. 26 May 2014. Archived from the original on 2 July 2018.
- "Narendra Modi to be sworn in as 15th Prime Minister of India on May 26". Deccan Chronicle. 20 May 2014. Archived from the original on 27 May 2014.
- Diwakar, Rekha (2014). "The 16th general election in India, April–May 2014". Electoral Studies. 37: 1–6. doi:10.1016/j.electstud.2014.11.005.
- Guha, Ramachandra (2007). India after Gandhi: the history of the world's largest democracy (1st ed.). India: Picador. ISBN 978-0-330-39610-3.
- "2009 Lok Sabha election: Final results tally". Hindustan Times. 17 May 2009. Archived from the original on 11 June 2013.
- Jaffrelot, Christophe (1996). The Hindu Nationalist Movement and Indian Politics. C. Hurst & Co. Publishers. ISBN 978-1-85065-301-1.
- Malik, Yogendra K.; Singh, V.B. (April 1992). "Bharatiya Janata Party: An Alternative to the Congress (I)?". Asian Survey. 32 (4): 318–336. doi:10.2307/2645149. JSTOR 2645149.
- Mathew, Liz (16 May 2014). "Narendra Modi makes election history as BJP gets majority on its own". Live Mint. Archived from the original on 27 May 2014.
- Naqvi, Saba; Raman, Anuradha (1 April 2013). "Their Dark Glasses". Outlook. Archived from the original on 21 December 2015.
- Pai, Sudha (December 1996). "Transformation of the Indian Party System: The 1996 Lok Sabha Elections". Asian Survey. 36 (12): 1170–1183. doi:10.2307/2645573. JSTOR 2645573.
- Ramesh, Randeep (14 May 2004). "News World news Shock defeat for India's Hindu nationalists". The Guardian. Archived from the original on 12 June 2018.
- Sridharan, Eswaran (October 2014). "India's Watershed Vote" (PDF). Journal of Democracy. 25 (4). doi:10.1353/jod.2014.0068. S2CID 154669666. Archived from the original (PDF) on 12 January 2015.
- "The Meaning of Verdict 2004". The Hindu. Chennai, India. 14 May 2004. Archived from the original on 16 September 2004.
- "Election results 2014: India places its faith in Moditva". Times Of India. 17 May 2014. Archived from the original on 20 October 2014.
- Varshney, Ashutosh (October 2014). "Hindu Nationalism in Power?". Journal of Democracy. 25 (4): 34–45. doi:10.1353/jod.2014.0071. S2CID 144608424.
