= Jairamdas Daulatram =

Indian politician

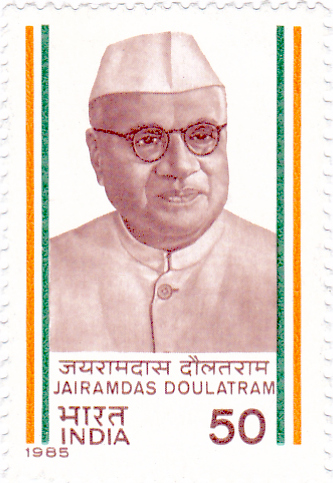
- Jairamdas Daulatram on a 1985 stamp of India

Union Minister of Agriculture
- In office 19 January 1948 – 13 May 1950
- Prime Minister: Jawaharlal Nehru
- Preceded by: Rajendra Prasad
- Succeeded by: Kanaiyalal Maneklal Munshi

Member of Parliament, Rajya Sabha
- In office 19 October 1959 – 2 April 1976
- Constituency: Nominated

Governor of Assam
- In office 27 May 1950 – 15 May 1956
- Chief Minister: Gopinath Bordoloi; Bishnuram Medhi
- Preceded by: Sri Prakasa
- Succeeded by: Fazal Ali

Governor of Bihar
- In office 15 August 1947 – 11 January 1948
- Chief Minister: Shri Krishna Sinha
- Preceded by: Sir Hugh Dow (As Governor under British rule)
- Succeeded by: Madhav Shrihari Aney

Personal details
- Born: 21 July 1891 Karachi, Bombay Presidency, British India
- Died: 1 March 1979 (aged 87) Delhi, India
- Party: Indian National Congress
- Occupation: Politician

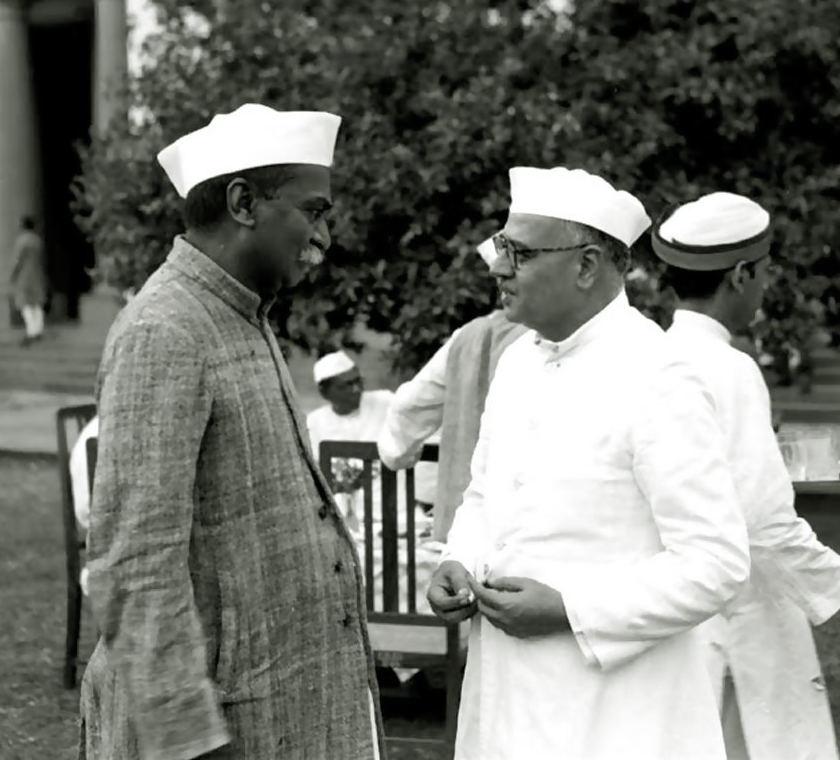
Rajendra Prasad and Jairamdas Daulatram

Jairamdas Daulatram (1891–1979) was an Indian political leader from Sindh, who was active in the Indian independence movement and later served in the Government of India. He was appointed as the Governor for the states of Bihar and later Assam. He played a key role in strengthening the North-East Frontier Tracts of India in the face of the Chinese annexation of Tibet, and managed the Indian integration of Tawang in 1951.

== Early life ==
Jairamdas Daulatram was born into a Sindhi Hindu family in Karachi, Sindh, which was then part of the Bombay Presidency in British India on 21 July 1891.

After receiving a degree in law, he started a legal practice, but soon gave it up as it often led to conflict with his conscience. In 1915, Daulatram came into contact with Mahatma Gandhi, who had then returned from South Africa, and became his devoted follower. At the Amritsar session of the Indian National Congress in 1919, he worded Gandhi's resolution in such a way that it avoided an impending rift between Gandhi and his other Congress colleagues. Since then Gandhi came to repose great faith in him. He compared him with pure gold saying : 'I swear by Jairamdas. Truer man I have not had the honour of meeting.' Jairamdas enjoyed the trust and affection of Mrs. Sarojini Naidu who described his as a 'Lamp in the Desert' because of his services in the Sindh, which was mostly a desert. His ties with Sardar Vallabhbhai Patel and Rajendra Prasad were also very close.

== Freedom struggle ==
Daulatram became an activist in the Home Rule Movement led by Annie Besant and Muhammad Ali Jinnah, demanding "Home Rule", or self-government and Dominion status for India within the British Empire. He also joined the Indian National Congress, which was the largest Indian political organisation. Daulatram was deeply influenced by the philosophy of Mahatma Gandhi, which advocated simple living, and a struggle for independence through ahimsa (non-violence) and satyagraha. perhaps Gandhi's sweetest relations were with Daulatram. At the Amritsar session of the Congress, 1919, acute differences had arisen on the reforms resolution between Gandhiji on the one hand and Tilak, C.R. Das and Mohammed Ali on the other. Recalled Gandhiji years later: "Jairamdas, that cool-headed Sindhi, came to the rescue. He passed me a slip containing a suggestion and pleading for a compromise. I hardly knew him. Something in his eyes and face captivated me. I read the suggestion. It was good. I passed it on to Deshbandhu. 'Yes, if my party Will accept it' was his response. Lokmanya said, 'I don't want to see it. If Das has approved, it is good enough for me.' Malaviya (who was presiding anxiously) overheard it, snatched the paper from my hands and, amid deafening cheers, announced that a compromise had been arrived at."

When Gandhi was launching the Salt March in 1930, he wrote to Daulatram, who was then member of the Bombay Legislative Council: "I have taken charge of the Committee for Boycott of Foreign Cloth. I must have a whole-time secretary, if that thing is to work. And I can think of nobody so suitable like you." Daulatram immediately resigned his seat, took up the new charge, and made a tremendous success of the boycott of foreign cloth.

Daulatram participated in the Non-cooperation movement (1920–1922), agitating against British rule through non-violent civil disobedience. Daulatram rose in the ranks of the Congress and became one of its foremost leaders from Sindh. He was a leading activist in the Salt March (1930–31) and the Quit India movement (1942–45), being imprisoned by British authorities. Daulatram was shot and wounded in the thigh when police opened fire on street protesters agitating outside a magistrate's court in Karachi in 1930.

== Post-independence career ==
In the 1947 Partition of India, Daulatram's native Sindh was included in newly created state of Pakistan, with Karachi as its capital. Daulatram stayed in India and was appointed the first Indian Governor of Bihar, a post he held until 1948. Then he was appointed the Union Minister for Food Supply. He represented a constituency from East Punjab in the Constituent Assembly of India and contributed to the drafting of the Constitution of India. He served as a member of the advisory, union subjects, and provincial constitution committees.

=== Governor of Assam ===
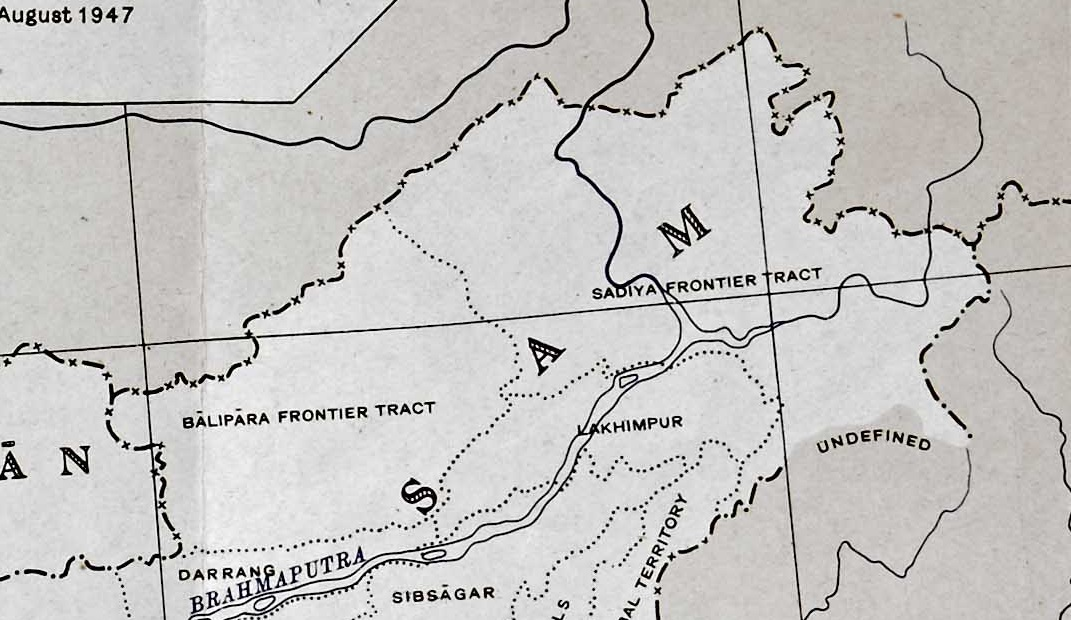
The North-East Frontier in the first political map of independent India, 1947

The Tawang district in a modern map

From 1950 to 1956, Daulatram served as the Governor of Assam, in a crucial period which saw the Chinese annexation of Tibet. The North-East Frontier Tracts (better known as North-East Frontier Agency, and later Arunachal Pradesh) were under the direct administration of the Governor in that period. After the Chinese made advances into Tibet in October 1950 with the avowed purpose of annexing it, the Union home minister Vallabhbhai Patel laid out a detailed programme of action for India to strengthen its frontiers against Tibet. Much of this programme fell on Daulatram's shoulders as the frontier tracts shared a long semi-settled border with Tibet. By December 1950, it was clear that the Chinese troops had occupied eastern Tibet up to Zayul, and were knocking on the doors of the Mishmi tribes. Daulatram sent Assam Rifles platoons to man the border in winter.

In December 1950, preparations were also made to occupy Tawang. The area around the Tawang village and monastery, i.e., the present day Tawang district, had not been integrated into frontier tracts when the British departed from India. It was vaguely administered by the Tawang Monastery under the supervision of lamas from Tibet's Tsona Dzong. In January 1951, Daulatram appointed Major Ralengnao Khathing ("Bob Khathing") of the Indian Frontier Administration Service as the Assistant Political Officer of the Sela Subagency (Note: The Sela Subagency was part of the Ballipara Frontier Tract, and constituted the present day West Kameng and East Kameng districts. It also included the area of the Tawang district, theoretically on Indian maps, which had not yet been brought into Indian administration.) and instructed him on the importance of speedy integration of Tawang into the Subagency. (Note: Khathing, who was a Tangkhul Naga tribesman from Manipur, was apparently the right man for the job. His tribal background gave him adequate local knowledge and the requisite empathy for the people of Tawang. Khathing had been an officer of Assam Rifles, but had switched to Political service prior to this, working as the Assistant Political Officer for the Tirap Agency.) Khathing set out from Tezpur with 200 troops of Assam Rifles on 17 January 1951, reaching Tawang on 7 February. He had his men do a flag march around Tawang with bayonets fixed to their guns in order to send a message that he meant business. He visited the Tawang Monastery on 11 February, paid respects to the lamas, and then ordered all the local officials that, from then on, no orders should be taken from the Tibetan lamas. When the lamas objected, he informed them that Tawang had been part of India since the Treaty of 1914.

The lamas evidently complained to the central Tibetan administration in Lhasa, who in turn complained to the Indian External Affairs Ministry, which was headed by Nehru. Apparently Nehru had not authorised the take-over of Tawang, and he ordered Daulatram and Khathing to come to Delhi to explain the matter. Scholar Sonia Shukla, who investigated the official correspondence, found that the Ministry was certainly aware of Daulatram's actions and had in fact authorised them. They perhaps kept Nehru in the dark for fear that he might not act decisively. Vallabhbhai Patel, who had died in December 1950, apparently initiated a sequence of actions that the officials were following.

== Preservation of Sindhi literature ==
Jairamdas Daulatram was one of the founding members of the Akhil Bharat Sindhi Boli Ain Sahit Sabha (All India Sindhi Language and Literature Congress).

== Legacy ==
Daulatram died in 1979. He was said to have been still a poor man, sticking to his Gandhian ideals. The town of Jarampur in the erstwhile Tirap Frontier Division (now Changlang district) was named after him. In 1985, a postage stamp was issued in his honour.

== Bibliography ==
- Arpi, Claude (2020). "The Indian Frontier Administrative Service: Romanticism and hostile borders". In Niraj Kumar; George van Driem; Phunchok Stobdan (eds.). Himalayan Bridge. Routledge. pp. 139–158. ISBN 978-1-00-021549-6.
- Arpi, Claude (2020), "Standing at the Himalayan Crossroads: A Tale of the Liberation of Tawang", in M. Mayilvaganan; Nasima Khatoon; Sourina Bej (eds.), Tawang, Monpas and Tibetan Buddhism in Transition: Life and Society along the India-China Borderland, Springer Singapore, pp. 45–58, ISBN 9789811543463
- Malhotra, Iqbal Chand (2020). Red Fear: The China Threat. Bloomsbury Publishing. ISBN 9789389867596.

Government offices
Preceded by Sir Hugh Dow	Governor of Bihar; 15 August 1947 – 11 January 1948	Succeeded by Madhav Shrihari Aney
Preceded by Sri Prakasa	Governor of Assam; 1950 – 1956	Succeeded by Saiyid Fazal Ali
