= 1934 Indian general election =

- 1934

147 seats contested 74 seats needed for a majority

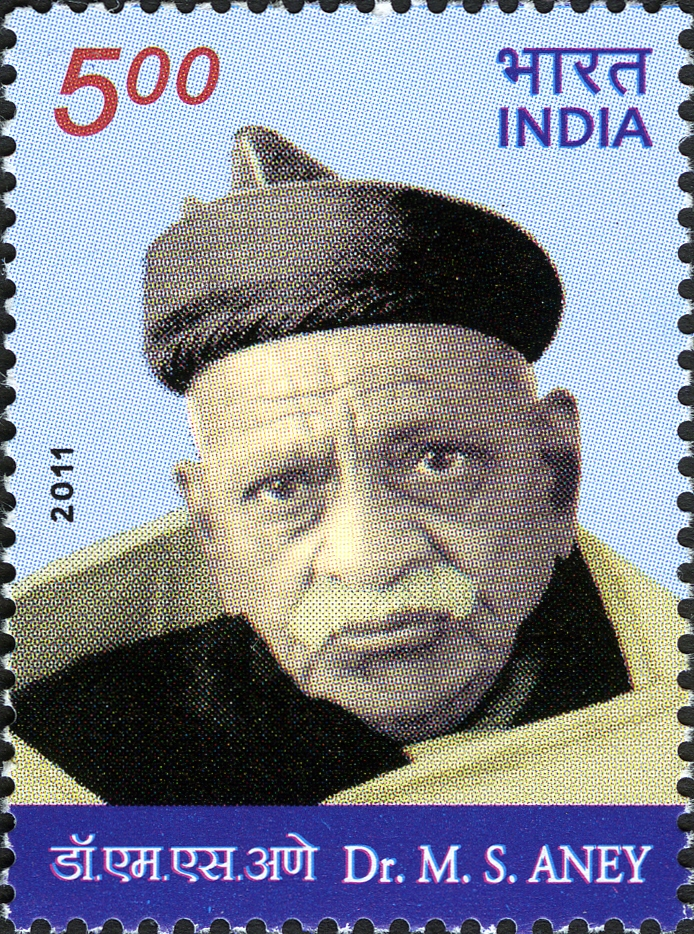
	First party	Second party
Leader	Bhulabhai Desai	Madhav Shrihari Aney
Party	INC	CNP
Seats won	42	12

General elections were held in British India in 1934. The Indian National Congress, running in its first national election, emerged as the largest party in the Central Legislative Assembly.

The total electorate for the 1934 elections was 1,415,892 (from a population of 242 million), of which 1,135,899 were in contested constituencies. The total number of votes polled was 608,198. The election marked the first year in which Indian women were eligible to vote in any but a local election. Of the 81,602 enrolled women voters, 62,757 of whom were in contested constituencies, only 14,505 actually used the ballot.

== Results ==
Out of the 51 general seats of the general constituencies, the Congress won 37 seats. The party also won 5 seats in the non-General constituencies. A Congress splinter group, the Congress Nationalist Party, was the only other one to gain a significant number of seats. Most of the 30 Muslim constituencies elected independents to the Council, but within the Council, leadership of the independent Muslims was assumed by Muhammad Ali Jinnah, who, shortly after the election, resumed the leadership of the moribund Muslim League from which he had previously retired. Of the 32 seats filled without a contest, twelve were in Muslim constituencies, eight in European constituencies, eight in general constituencies, three reserved for landholders and one reserved for commerce.

Party	Seats
Indian National Congress	42
Congress Nationalist Party	12
Europeans	9
People's Party	3
Independents	41
Appointed members	41
Total	148
Source: The Times Schwartzberg Atlas

=== Membership by province ===
Province	Europeans	Independent	Minor parties	Congress (General)	Congress (Non-General)	Total
Assam		1	1	2		4
Ajmer-Merwara		1				1
Bengal	3	7	6	1		17
Bihar and Orissa		5		7		12
Bombay	2	8	1	5		16
Burma	1		3 (People's Party)			4
Central Provinces		1	1	3	1	6
Delhi				1		1
Madras	1	4		10	1	16
North West Frontier Province					1	1
Punjab		8	3	1		12
United Provinces	1	6		8	1	16
Total	8	41	15	37	5	106

The party position in 1941 stood as follows: Central Legislative Assembly

Party	Seats
Indian National Congress	40
All-India Muslim League	25
Congress Nationalist Party	11
Non Party	25
Independents	10
Europeans	9
Officials	20
Total	140

Council of State

Party	Seats
Independent Progressive Party	10
Indian National Congress	6
All-India Muslim League	6
Officials	20
Total	42

== Members of Central Legislative Assembly ==
Assembly member
Membership	Province / Category	Constituency	Representation	Member
Nominated	Government of India	—N/a	Government of India	Sir Frank Noyce
Nominated	Government of India	—N/a	Government of India	Sir Nripendra Nath Sircar
Nominated	Government of India	—N/a	Government of India	Sir James Grigg
Nominated	Government of India	—N/a	Government of India	Sir Henry Craik
Nominated	Government of India	—N/a	Government of India	Muhammad Zafrulla Khan
Nominated	Government of India	—N/a	Government of India	P. R. Rau
Nominated	Government of India	—N/a	Government of India	Girija Shankar Bajpai
Nominated	Government of India	—N/a	Government of India	Sir Aubrey Metcalfe
Nominated	Government of India	—N/a	Government of India	G. R. F. Tottenham
Nominated	Government of India	—N/a	Government of India	A. G. Clow
Nominated	Government of India	—N/a	Government of India	A. H. Lloyd
Nominated	Government of India	—N/a	Government of India	A. S. Hands
Nominated	Government of India	—N/a	Government of India	G. H. Spence
Nominated	Government of India	—N/a	Government of India	H. Dow
Nominated	Madras	—N/a	Province Officials	A. A. Venkatarama Ayyar
Nominated	Madras	—N/a	Province Officials	R. V. Krishna Ayyar
Nominated	Bombay	—N/a	Province Officials	S. A. V. Acott
Nominated	Bombay	—N/a	Province Officials	Saiyid Aminuddin
Nominated	Bengal	—N/a	Province Officials	A. J. Dash
Nominated	Bengal	—N/a	Province Officials	Srimanta Kumar Das Gupta
Nominated	Punjab	—N/a	Province Officials	Shaikh Khurshaid Muhammad
Nominated	Central Provinces	—N/a	Province Officials	N. J. Roughton
Nominated	Central Provinces	—N/a	Province Officials	W. V. Grigson
Nominated	Assam	—N/a	Province Officials	J. H. Hutton
Nominated	United Provinces	—N/a	Province Officials	L. Owen
Nominated	United Provinces	—N/a	Province Officials	J. F. Sale
Nominated	Bihar & Orissa	—N/a	Province Officials	Shyam Narayan Singh
Nominated	Burma	—N/a	Province Officials	R. M. MacDougall
Nominated	Berar	—N/a	Berar Representative	M. S. Aney
Nominated	Depressed Classes	—N/a	Special Interests	M. C. Rajah
Nominated	Anglo-Indian	—N/a	Special Interests	Henry Gidney
Nominated	Indian Christians	—N/a	Special Interests	Dr. F. X. DeSouza
Nominated	Associated Chamber of Commerce	—N/a	Special Interests	L. C. Buss
Nominated	Labour Interests	—N/a	Special Interests	N. M. Joshi
Nominated	Bombay	—N/a	Province Non-Officials	Dr. R. D. Dalal
Nominated	Bengal	—N/a	Province Non-Officials	Sir Satya Charan Mukherjee
Nominated	Punjab	—N/a	Province Non-Officials	Sardar Jawahar Singh
Nominated	Bihar & Orissa	—N/a	Province Non-Officials	Ramaswami Srinivasa Sarma
Elected	Ajmer-Merwara	Ajmer-Merwara	General	Seth Bhagchand Soni
Elected	Assam	Assam Valley	General	Kuladhar Chaliha
Elected	Assam	Assam Valley	General	Nabin Chandra Bardoloi
Elected	Assam	Surma Valley cum Shillong	General	Basanta Kumar Das
Elected	Assam	Assam	Muslim	Abdul Matin Chaudhury
Elected	Assam	Assam	European	C. H. Witherington
Elected	Bengal	Calcutta	General	N. C. Chunder
Elected	Bengal	Calcutta Suburbs	General	P. N. Banerjea
Elected	Bengal	Burdwan	General	Amarendranath Chatterjee
Elected	Bengal	Presidency	General	Pandit Lakshmi Kanta Maitra
Elected	Bengal	Dacca	General	Suryya Kumar Som
Elected	Bengal	Chittagong & Rajshahi	General	Akhil Chandra Datta
Elected	Bengal	Calcutta & Suburbs	Muslim	Sir Abdur Rahim
Elected	Bengal	Burdwan & Presidency	Muslim	Haji Chowdhury Muhammad Ismail Khan
Elected	Bengal	Dacca-cum-Mymensingh	Muslim	Sir Abdul Halim Ghuznavi
Elected	Bengal	Chittagong	Muslim	Anwarul Azim
Elected	Bengal	Rajshahi	Muslim	Khabeeruddin Ahmed
Elected	Bengal	Bengal	European	T. Chapman Mortimer
Elected	Bengal	Bengal	European	A. Aikman
Elected	Bengal	Bengal	Landholders	Dhirendra Kanta Lahiri Chaudhury
Elected	Bengal	Bengal	Marwari Association	Babu Baijnath Bajoria
Elected	Bihar & Orissa	Orissa	General	Bhubananda Das
Elected	Bihar & Orissa	Orissa	General	Nilakantha Das
Elected	Bihar & Orissa	Patna-cum-Shahabad	General	Anugrah Narayan Sinha
Elected	Bihar & Orissa	Gaya-cum-Monghyr	General	Shri Krishna Sinha
Elected	Bihar & Orissa	Muzaffarpur-cum-Champaran	General	Bepin Bihari Verma
Elected	Bihar & Orissa	Bhagalpur, Purnea & Santhal districts	General	Kailash Bihari Lall
Elected	Bihar & Orissa	Darbhanga cum Saran	General	Satyendra Narayan Sinha
Elected	Bihar & Orissa	Bihar & Orissa	Landholders	Raja Bahadur Harihar Prasad Narayan Sinha
Elected	Bombay	Bombay City	General	Dr. Gopalrao V. Deshmukh
Elected	Bombay	Bombay City	General	Sir Cowasji Jehangir
Elected	Bombay	Sind	General	Lalchand Navalrai
Elected	Bombay	Bombay Northern	General	Bhulabhai Desai
Elected	Bombay	Bombay Central	General	Keshavrao Jedhe
Elected	Bombay	Bombay Central	General	Narhar Vishnu Gadgil
Elected	Bombay	Bombay City	Muslim	Muhammad Ali Jinnah
Elected	Bombay	Sind	Muslim	Abdullah Haroon
Elected	Bombay	Bombay Central	Muslim	Hooseinbhoy A. Lalljee
Elected	Bombay	Bombay	Bombay Millowners' Association	Homi Mody
Elected	Bombay	Bombay	Indian Merchants' Chamber & Bureau	Mathuradas Vissanji
Elected	Bombay	Bombay	Jagirdars & Landholders	Ghulam Hussain Hidayatullah
Elected	Bombay	Bombay	European	W. B. Hossack
Elected	Bombay	Bombay	European	Sir Leslie Hudson
Elected	Burma	Burma	General	Dr. Thein Maung
Elected	Burma	Burma	General	U Ba Si
Elected	Burma	Burma	European	F. B. Leach
Elected	Central Provinces	Nagpur	General	Narayan Bhaskar Khare
Elected	Central Provinces	Hindi Divisions	General	Seth Govind Das
Elected	Central Provinces	Hindi Divisions	General	Ghanshyam Singh Gupta
Elected	Central Provinces	Central Provinces	Muslim	Khan Saheb Nawab Siddique Ali Khan
Elected	Central Provinces	Central Provinces	Landholders	Seth Sheodass Daga
Elected	Delhi	Delhi	General	Asaf Ali
Elected	Madras	Madras City	General	S. Satyamurti
Elected	Madras	Madras Ceded Districts & Chittoor	General	M. A. Ayyangar
Elected	Madras	Ganjam cum Vizagapatam	General	V. V. Giri
Elected	Madras	Godavari cum Kistna	General	Kasinathuni Nageswara Rao
Elected	Madras	Guntur-cum-Nellore	General	N. G. Ranga
Elected	Madras	Salem & Coimbatore cum North Arcot	General	T. S. Avinashilingam Chettiar
Elected	Madras	South Arcot cum Chingleput	General	C. N. Muthuranga Mudaliar
Elected	Madras	Tanjore cum Trichinopoly	General	T. S. S. Rajan
Elected	Madras	Madura & Ramnad cum Tinnevelly	General	P. S. Kumaraswami Raja
Elected	Madras	West Coast & Nilgiris	General	Samuel Aaron
Elected	Madras	North Madras	Muslim	Umar Ali Shah
Elected	Madras	South Madras	Muslim	Moulvi Sayyid Murtuza Saheb Bahadur
Elected	Madras	West Coast & Nilgiris	Muslim	Haji Abdul Sathar H. Essak Seit
Elected	Madras	Madras	European	F. E. James
Elected	Madras	Madras	Landholders	Raja Sir Vasudeva Rajah of Kollengode
Elected	Madras	Madras	Indian Commerce	Sami Venkatachalam Chetty
Elected	NWFP	NWFP	General	Khan Abdul Jabbar Khan
Elected	Punjab	Ambala	General	Lala Sham Lal
Elected	Punjab	West Punjab	General	Bhai Parmanand
Elected	Punjab	Jullundur	General	Raizada Hans Raj
Elected	Punjab	East Punjab	Muslim	Ghulam Bhik Nairang
Elected	Punjab	East Central Punjab	Muslim	K. L. Gauba
Elected	Punjab	East Central Punjab	Muslim	Zafar Ali Khan
Elected	Punjab	West Central Punjab	Muslim	H. M. Abdullah
Elected	Punjab	North Punjab	Muslim	Nawab Sahibzada Sayed Sir Muhammad Mehr Shah
Elected	Punjab	North-West Punjab	Muslim	Khan Bahadur Shaik Fazal-i-Haq Piracha
Elected	Punjab	South West Punjab	Muslim	Khan Bahadur Nawab Makhdum Murid Hussain Qureshi
Elected	Punjab	East Punjab	Sikh	Mangal Singh
Elected	Punjab	East Punjab	Sikh	Sardar Harbans Singh Brar
Elected	Punjab	West Punjab	Sikh	Sardar Sant Singh
Elected	Punjab	Punjab	Landholders	M. Ghiasuddin
Elected	United Provinces	UP Cities	General	Bhagwan Das
Elected	United Provinces	Meerut	General	Choudhri Raghubir Narain Singh
Elected	United Provinces	Agra	General	Sri Krishna Dutta Paliwal
Elected	United Provinces	Agra	General	Kunwar Raghubir Singh
Elected	United Provinces	Rohilkund & Kumaon	General	Govind Ballabh Pant
Elected	United Provinces	Allahabad & Jhansi	General	Sri Prakasa
Elected	United Provinces	Benaras & Gorakhpur	General	Krishna Kant Malaviya
Elected	United Provinces	Agra	Muslim	Muhammad Yamin Khan
Elected	United Provinces	Rohilkund & Kumaon	Muslim	Maulvi Sir Muhammad Yakub
Elected	United Provinces	UP Southern	Muslim	Ziauddin Ahmad
Elected	United Provinces	Lucknow & Fyzabad	Muslim	Mohamed Azhar Ali
