= Torgya =

Annual festival in India

Torgya, also known as Tawang-Torgya, is an annual festival that is exclusively held in Tawang Monastery, Arunachal Pradesh, India. It is held according to the Buddhist calendar days of 28th to 30th of Dawachukchipa, which corresponds to 10 to 12 January of the Gregorian calendar, and is a Monpa celebration. The objective of the festival is to ward off any kind of external aggression and to protect people from natural disasters.

== Features ==
In the three-day festival, costumed dances are very popular and held in the courtyard of the monastery with the objective of removing evil spirits and usher all round prosperity and happiness to the people in the ensuing year. The popular dances performed with artists donning colorful costumes and masks are: the Pha Chan and the Losjker Chungiye, the latter is performed by the monks of the monastery. Each dance represents a myth and costumes and masks represent animal forms such as cows, tigers, sheep, monkeys and so forth.

The first day's festival is called Torgya and involves worship of the image created specially for the occasion. The creation of the images starts 16 days prior to the festival. The image is created to a height of 3 feet (0.91 m) with a width of 2 feet (0.61 m), and is exclusively crafted by 14 lamas of the monastery. Right from day one of making the image till it is completed, scriptures are recited by the monks of the monastery to the accompaniment of beating of drums by another group of lamas. The ingredients used for making the image are ghee, barley, milk and molasses, and it is done in honour of Lama Tsongkapa. The quantity of barley used in making the image will be more than other ingredients. The image is named as Torma. Concurrent with the making of the image, dry bamboo leaves are gathered from distant places and formed into a mound, in the shape of a temple, which is known as "Mechang". The Head Lama (Khambu) of the monastery burns the Mechang in the presence of other Lamas.

At the same time, the image "Torma" is brought out in a procession to the location of the mound. It is carried by Lamas of the monastery, known as Arpo, wearing bells around their waist. Two other Lamas also accompany the Torma, one wearing a male mask made of yak horn and the other wearing a female mask, also made of yak horn. These two Lamas are called the Choige yap-yum ('yap' meaning "male" and 'yum' meaning "female"); this is supposed to signify the male and female servants of Lama Tsongkapa. The procession of the Torma is accompanied by other Lamas carrying swords, beating drums and cymbals. On reaching the location of the Mechang, the Torma is ritually touched by the Head Lama, and then consumed into the flaming fire of the Mechang. The practice of touching the Torma by the Head Lama is called the Sangonna-Torgya. On completion of this religious practice, the Head Lama returns to the Monastery accompanied by other Lamas.

The ritual on the final day of the festival is known as "Wang" performed at the monastery. On this occasion, sweets called Tseril are prepared by mixing barley and sugar or molasses and then solidifying it, which is then made into small balls. Prayers are then offered by the Head Lama, which is followed by distribution of the Tseril. Along with the sweets, local beer called Tse-Chang is also served in a bowl made of human skull. The oblation of Tse-Chang is distributed in a very small quantity, of say a few drops to the devotees. After this ritual, the Head Lama gives blessings, called the Tse-Boom. He blesses all the assembled devotees by touching their heads; during this process the other lamas tie small strips of cloth, of half to one inch width, of white, red or blue or other colors, on the wrist of devotees. Concurrently, strips of yellow cloth are tied by a senior Lama around the neck of all lamas and Anis (nuns), as a sign of blessings for happiness and long life.

== See also ==
- Tawang Monastery

== Bibliography ==
- Kohli, M.S. (2002). Mountains of India: Tourism, Adventure and Pilgrimage. Indus Publishing. ISBN 978-81-7387-135-1.
- Pathak, Guptajit; Gogoi, Raju (2008). Cultural fiesta in the "Island of peace" Arunachal Pradesh. Mittal Publications. ISBN 978-81-8324-231-8.
