= Ranganath Ramachandra Diwakar =

Indian author and politician

R. R. Diwakar
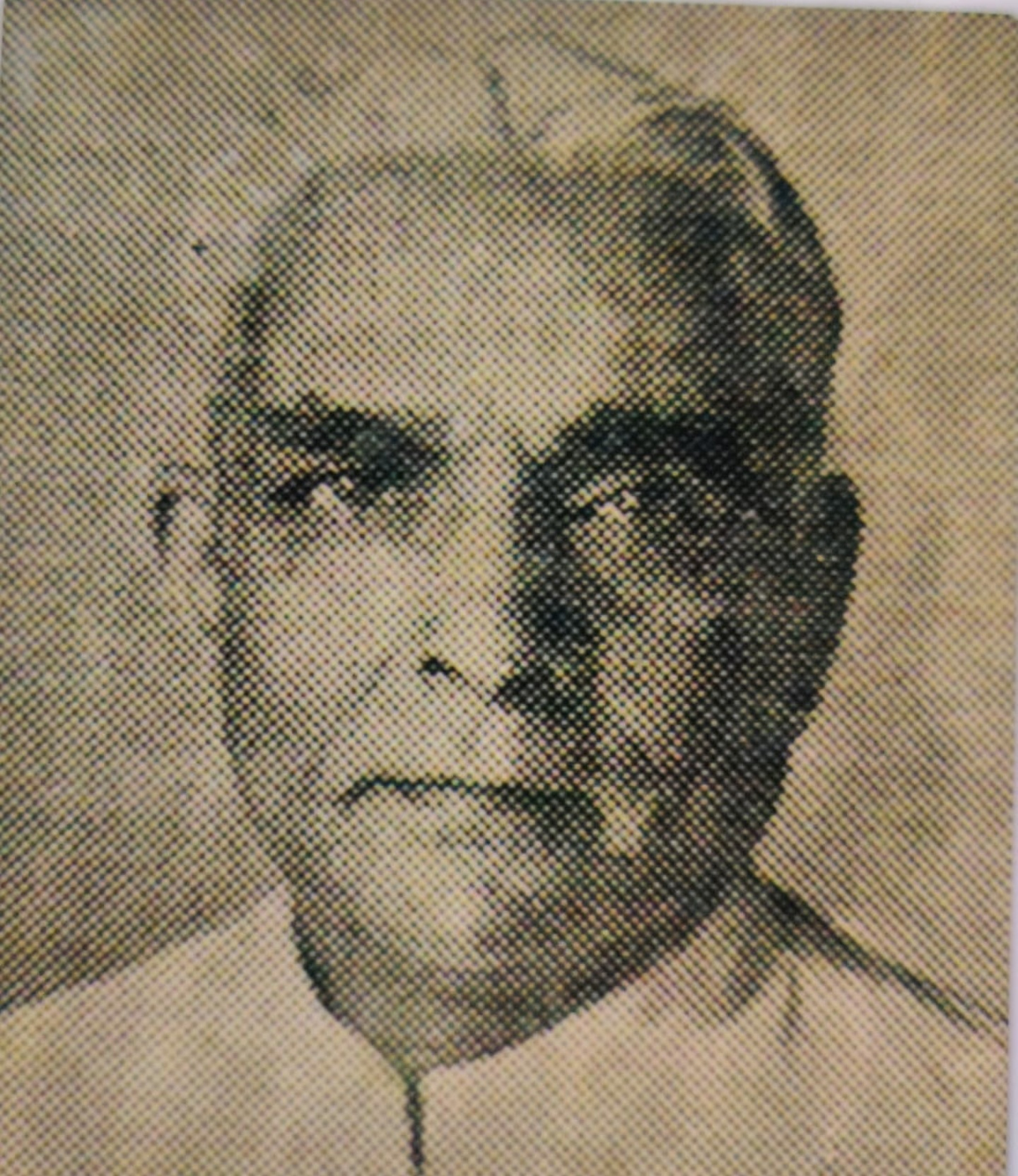

Governor of Bihar
- In office 15 June 1952 – 5 July 1957
- Preceded by: Madhav Shrihari Aney
- Succeeded by: Zakir Husain

2nd Minister of Information and Broadcasting
- In office 1 April 1949 – 15 April 1952
- Prime Minister: Jawaharlal Nehru
- Preceded by: Vallabhbhai Patel
- Succeeded by: B. V. Keskar

Member of Parliament, Rajya Sabha
- In office 3 April 1962 – 2 April 1968
- Constituency: Nominated

Personal details
- Born: Ranganath Ramachandra Diwakar; 30 September 1894
- Died: 15 January 1990 (aged 95)
- Party: Indian National Congress
- Occupation: Politician, writer

Ranganath Ramachandra Diwakar (30 September 1894 – 15 January 1990) was an Indian writer and politician who served as 2nd Minister of Information and Broadcasting from 1950 to 1952.

== Biography ==
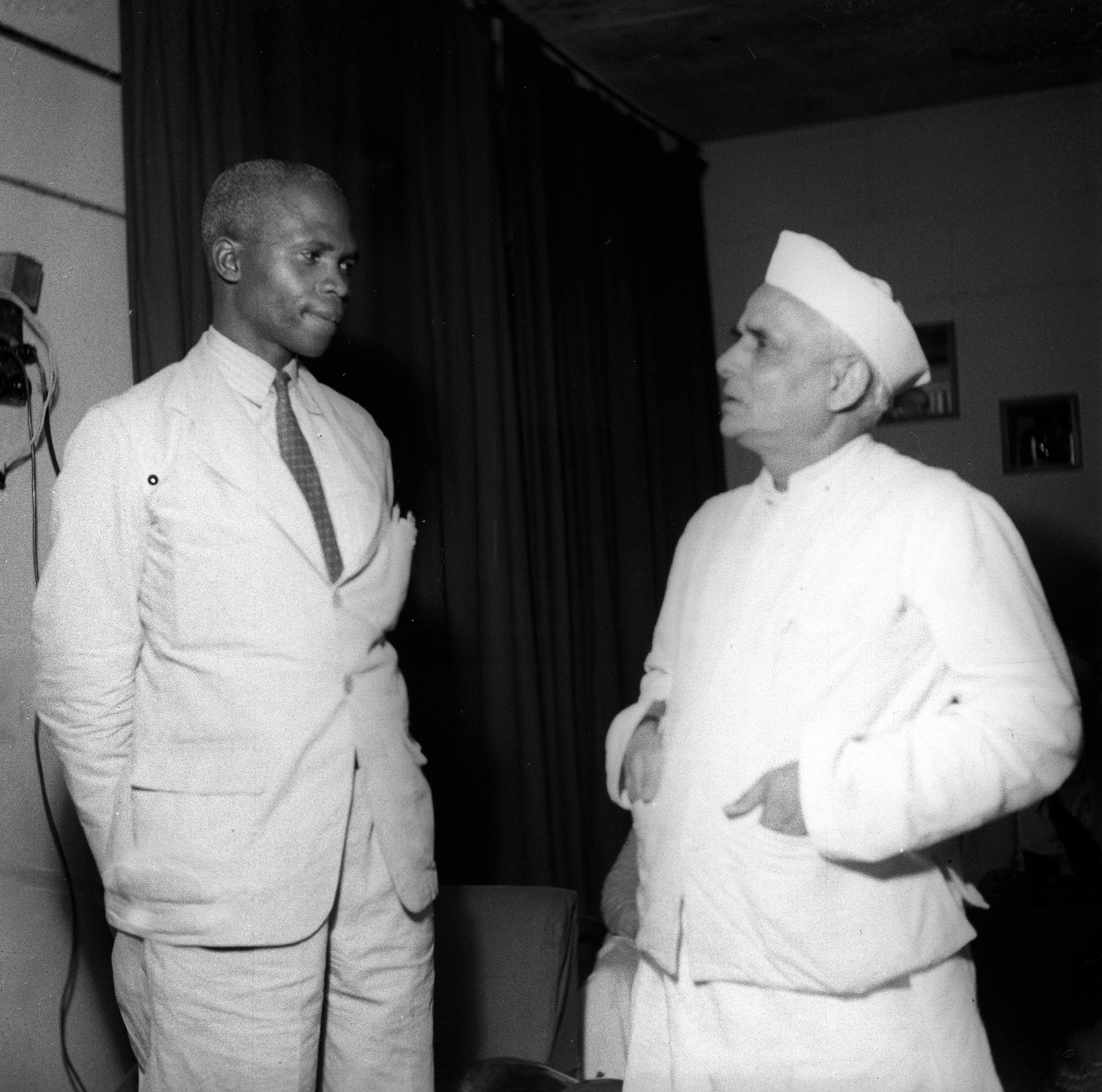
Diwakar (right) with Godwin Mbikusita Lewanika (left), 1950

R. R. Diwakar was born on 30 September 1894. From the very beginning, he was interested in writing. He made many efforts to unify the Kannada linguistic regions.

He joined the Indian National Congress during the independence movement. Later he became a member of the Constituent Assembly and Provisional Parliament of India from Bombay State. He served as the Union Minister of Information and Broadcasting in the Nehru cabinet (from 1 April 1949 to 15 April 1952).

He was elected as a member of the Rajya Sabha from Bombay State on 3 April 1952, but resigned on 13 June 1952. Within two days he was appointed the Governor of Bihar (15 June 1952 to 5 July 1957). He was nominated to the Rajya Sabha in 1962 from Karnataka where he served till 1968.

After 1968, he distanced himself from politics and wrote several books in English, Kannada and Hindi.

He died on 15 January 1990.

Political offices
Preceded by Madhav Shrihari Aney	Governor of Bihar; 1952–1957	Succeeded by Zakir Hussain
