= Uttar Pradesh Praja Party =

- Leader: Jagdish Prasad
- President: Jagdish Prasad
- Secretary: Guru Narain Seth
- Founder: Jagdish Prasad
- Founded: 5-6 April 1951
- Ideology: Conservatism (Indian) Anti-communism; Agrarianism Pro-Western Bloc

The Uttar Pradesh Praja Party was a political party in Uttar Pradesh, India. The party represented interests of zamindars (land owners), and contested the elections of 1951–52. The party was formed to oppose the Indian National Congress policy of abolition of the zamindari system.

The idea to set up a conservative political party emerged in early 1950. An 'All India Democratic Convention' was organised in Lucknow on 14–15 May 1950, which sought to highlist property ownership rights as a civil liberties issue, and this conference set up two committees. A seven-member team was charged with drafting the constitution of the new party; this group would collaborate with a 28-member 'Programme Committee'. Moreover, the conference named regional organisers to build up branches of the new party. At the conference Sir Jagdish Prasad (who had organised the event) spoke of the need for a pro-Western foreign policy as integral component to resist communism and land reform. However, these committees and organisers proved ineffectual and no real progress was made to found a political party as such. A zamindar conference was held in August 1950, and debated the issue of setting up a political party on similar lines as the Lucknow convention. By November 1950 Jagdish Prasad took lead in the party-building process and announced a conference to take place on 19 December 1950. The group of Jagdish Prasad began to be known informally as the 'Praja Party'.

The Praja Party was formally founded at a conference of the Zamindar Union on 5–6 April 1951. Jagdish Prasad was appointed president and Guru Narain Seth was named secretary of the new party. Jagdish Prasad was given the authority to appoint a 30-member Working Committee of the party, which would oversee District Electoral Boards. A 250-member State Council was to be set up, with each district of Uttar Pradesh having at least four delegates. The conference declared that the goal would be to recruit 2.5 million levy-paying party members.

Whilst the April 1951 conference had set out ambitious goals for the new party, followed by a number of party meetings and an agitation tour of Guru Narain Seth and the Raja of Oel, its hopes were soon dashed. Extensive powers had been vested in Jagdish Prasad, but his health was increasingly weak. In his absence Guru Narain Seth emerged as the main leader of the party. Many zamindars opted to not support the party and it found itself unable to field the number of candidates it had set out to do. A party meeting was held in Lucknow in January 1952.

The party won two seats in the Uttar Pradesh Legislative Assembly in the 1951–52 election, Birendra Bikram Singh in Nanpara East and Virendra Shah in Kalpi-cum-Jalaun North. The party had fielded a total of 55 candidates, who together mustered 301,322 votes (1.80% of the total votes in the state). In the Lok Sabha election the party fielded six candidates, whom together obtained 213,656 votes (0.20% of the nationwide vote). The party disappeared after the elections.
