= Moreshwar Vasudeo Abhyankar =

Indian independence activist

- Born: 19 August 1886
- Died: 2 January 1935 (aged 48)
- Occupations: Lawyer, freedom fighter

Moreshwar Vasudeo Abhyankar (19 August 1886 – 2 January 1935) was a lawyer, freedom fighter, and a Tilakite member of Indian National Congress from Nagpur. Moreshwar Vasudev Abhyankar was a home rule activist from Vidarbha.
