= Tawang Monastery =

Tibetan Buddhist monastery in Tawang, Arunachal Pradesh, India

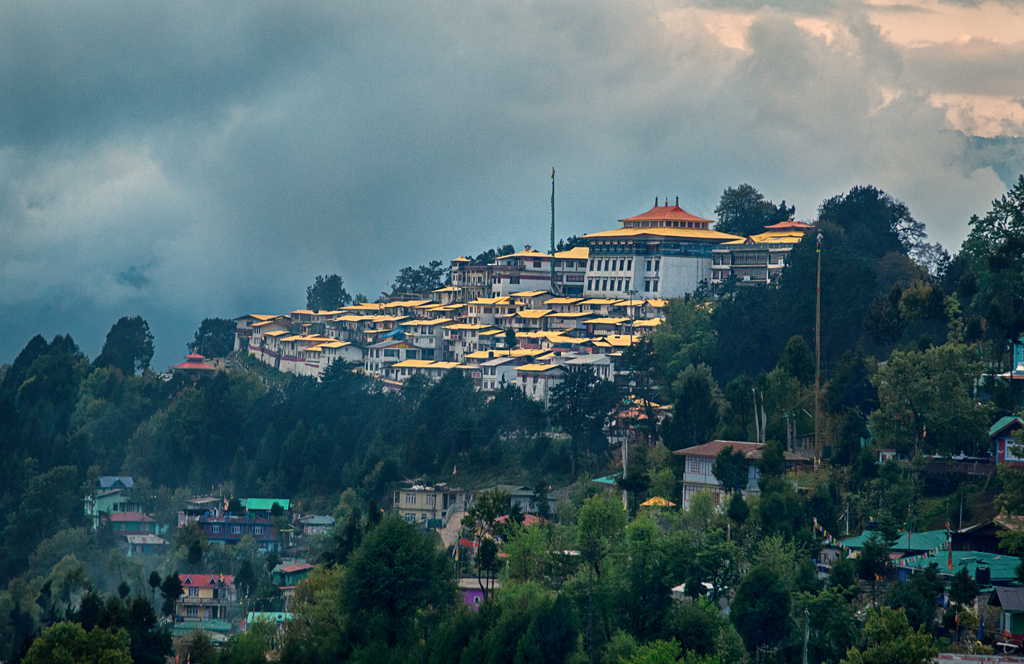
- Tawang Monastery

- Location within India Tawang Monastery (India)

Religion
- Affiliation: Tibetan Buddhism
- Sect: Gelug
- Festivals: Losar, Torgya

Location
- Location: Tawang, Arunachal Pradesh
- Country: India
- Interactive map of Tawang Monastery
- Coordinates: 27°35′11″N 91°51′27″E

Architecture
- Style: Dzong
- Founder: Mera Lama Lodre Gyasto
- Established: 1680; 346 years ago
- Completed: 17th century

Tawang Monastery is a Buddhist monastery located in Tawang, Arunachal Pradesh, India. It is the largest Buddhist monastery in the country. It is situated in the valley of the Tawang Chu, in close proximity to the Chinese and Bhutanese border.

Tawang Monastery is known in Tibetan as Gaden Namgyal Lhatse, which translates to "the divine paradise of complete victory". It was founded by Merak Lama Lodre Gyatso in 1680–1681 in accordance with the wishes of the 5th Dalai Lama, Ngawang Lobsang Gyatso. It belongs to the Gelug school of Vajrayana Buddhism and had a religious association with Drepung Monastery of Lhasa, which continued during the period of British rule.

The monastery is three stories high. It is enclosed by a 925 feet (282 m) long compound wall. Within the complex there are 65 residential buildings. The library of the monastery has valuable old scriptures, mainly Kangyur and Tengyur.

== Etymology ==
The full name of the monastery is Tawang Galdan Namgye Lhatse. Ta means "horse" and wang means "chosen", which together forms the word Tawang, meaning "the location selected by horse". Furthermore, Gadan means "paradise", Namgyal means "complete victory" and Lhatse means "divine". Thus, the full meaning of Tawang Galdan Namgye Lhatse is "the site chosen by the horse is the divine paradise of complete victory".

== Location ==
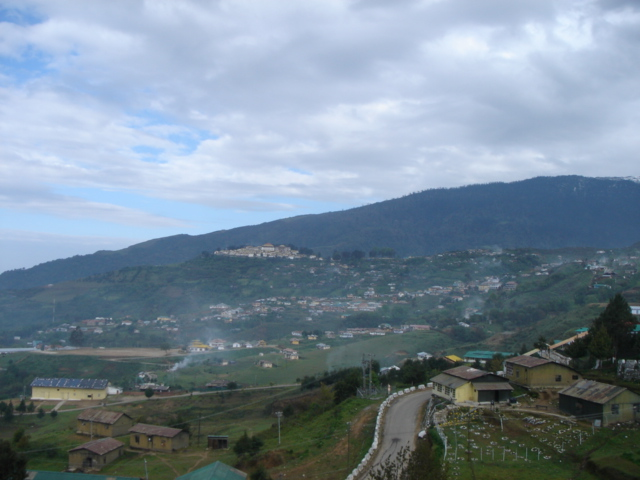
View in the distance

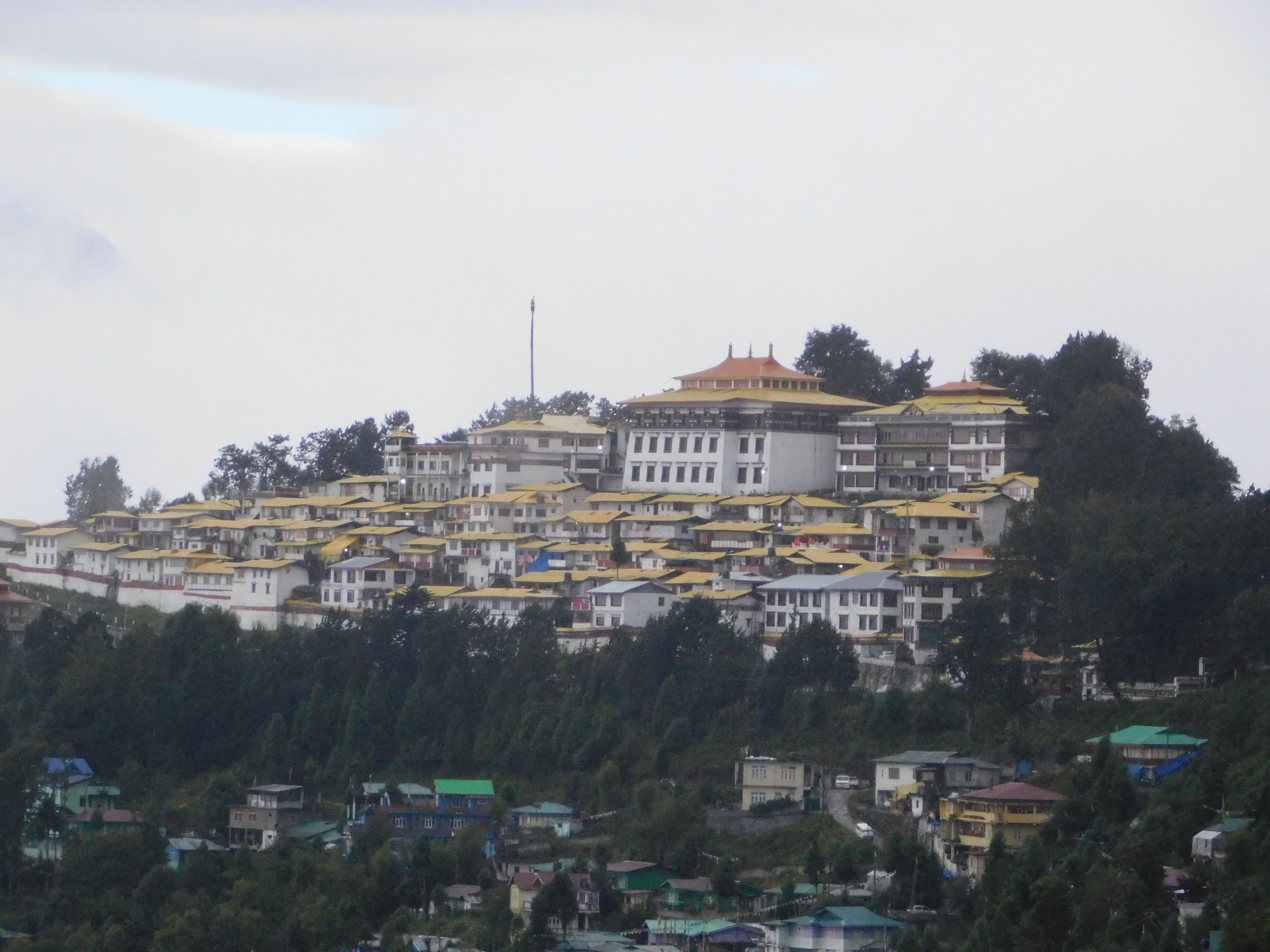
View from Tawang DC Office

The monastery is situated near the top of a mountain, at an elevation of about 10,000 feet (3,000 m), with a commanding view of the Tawang Chu valley, which comprises snow-capped mountains and coniferous forest. It is bounded on its southern and western flanks by steep ravines formed by streams, a narrow spur on the north and a gently sloping ground on the east. The monastery is entered from the northern direction along a sloping spur, which has alpine vegetation. Nearby Tawang Town, named after the monastery, is well connected by road, rail and air services. Bhalukpong, which is the nearest rail head, is 280 kilometres (170 mi) away by road. Tezpur Airport is the nearest airport at a road distance of 350 kilometres (220 mi).

== Legends ==
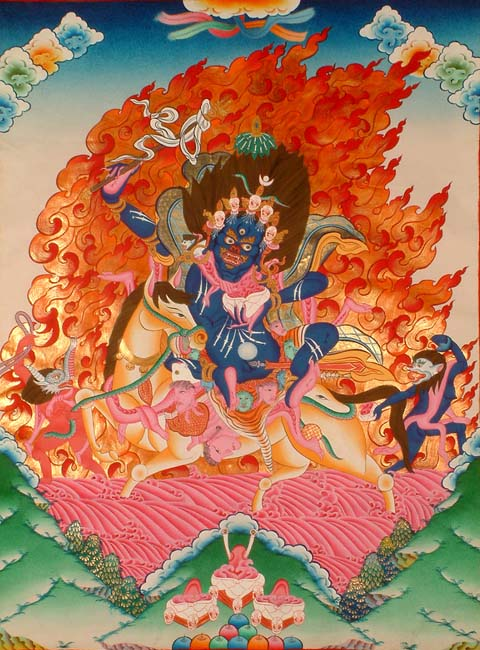
A thangka of Palden Lhamo guardian deity of the monastery

Three legends are narrated to the establishment of the monastery. In the first legend it is said that location of the present Monastery was selected by a horse which belonged to Merag Lama Lodre Gyatso who was on a mission assigned to him by the 5th Dalai Lama to establish a Monastery. After an intense search, when he failed to locate a suitable place, he retired into a cave to offer prayers seeking divine intervention to choose the site. When he came out of the cave, he found his horse missing. He then went in search of the horse and finally found it grazing at the top of a mountain called Tana Mandekhang, which in the past was the palace of King Kala Wangpo. He took this as a divine and auspicious guidance and decided to establish the monastery at that location. Seeking the help of the local people, Mera Lama established the monastery at that location in the latter part of 1681.

The second legend of the derivation of the name Tawang is linked to Terton Pemalingpa, diviner of treasures. At this location, he is stated to have given "initiations" of Tamdin and Kagyad, which resulted in the name "Tawang". 'Ta' is an abbreviated form for "Tamdin" and 'Wang' means "initiation".

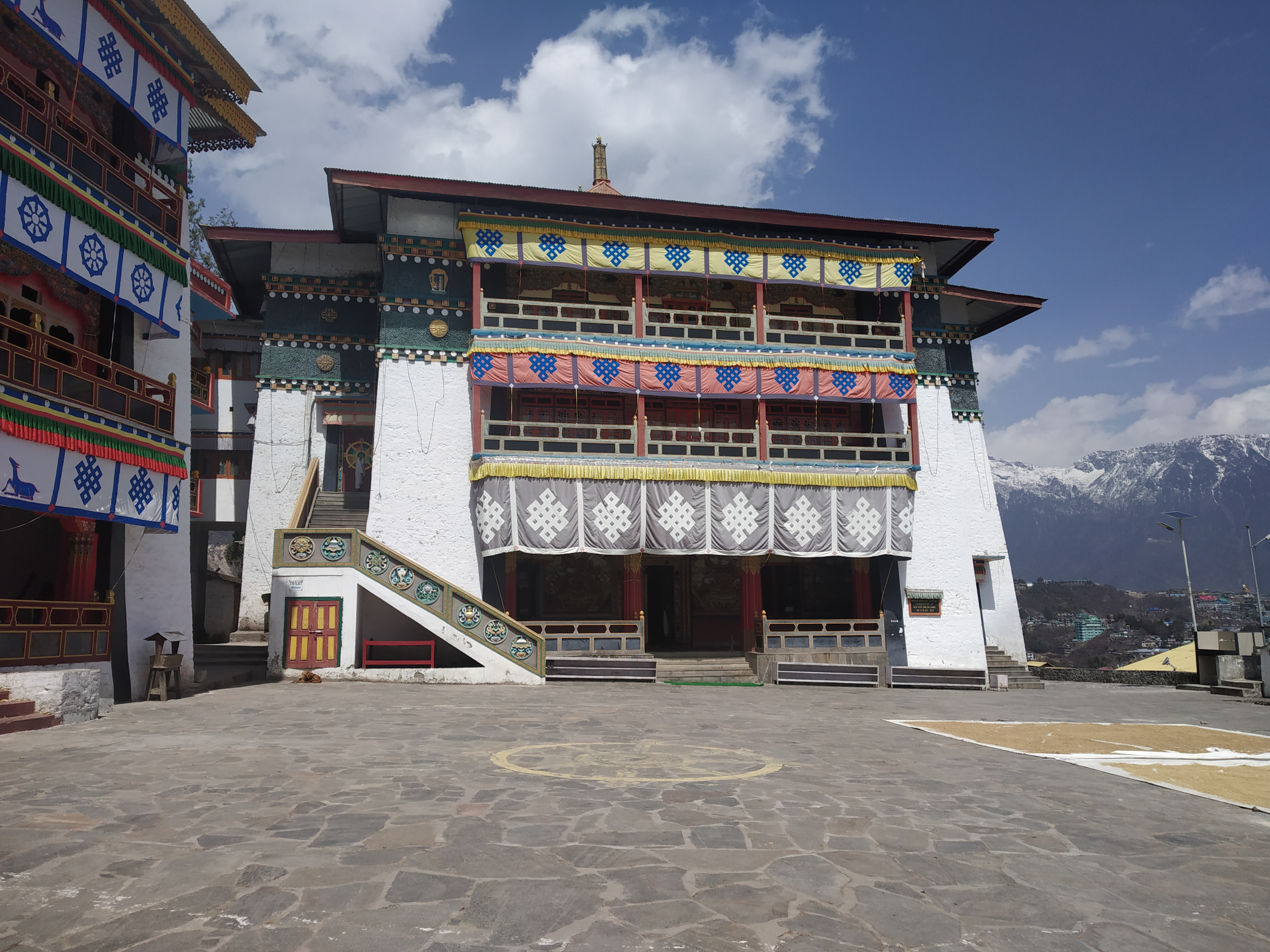
Courtyard

According to the third legend, a white horse of the Prince of Lhasa had wandered into Monpa region. People, who went in search of the horse, found the horse grazing at the present location of the monastery. The people of the area then worshipped the horse and the location where it was found and venerated it every year. Eventually, to honour the sacred site, the Tawang Monastery was built at the site.

One more legend narrated is about the goddess painted on a thangka in the monastery which is of Palden Lhamo.

== History ==
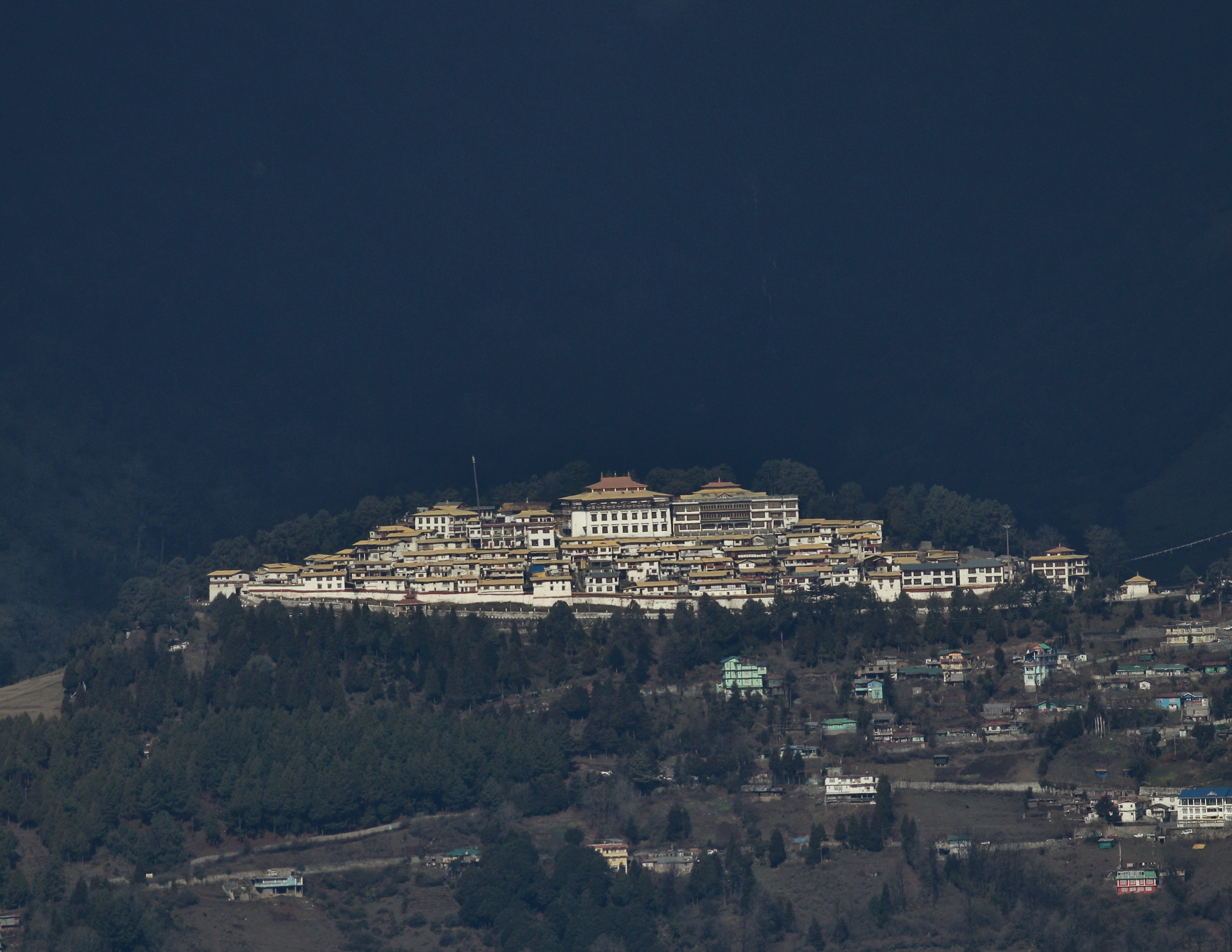
View of the Tawang Monastery from the Jaswantgarh War Memorial

The monastery was founded by Merek Lama Lodre Gyamsto in 1680–81 at the behest of the 5th Dalai Lama, who was his contemporary. When Merek Lama was experiencing difficulties in building the monastery at the chosen location of Tsosum, the ancient name for Tawang, the 5th Dalai Lama issued directives to the people of the area to provide him all help. To fix the perimeter of the Dzong, the Dalai Lama had also given a ball of yarn, the length of which was to form the limit of the monastery.

Prior to the dominance of the Gelug sect of Buddhism in Tawang, the Nyingmapa or the Black Hat sect of Buddhism was dominant and this resulted in their hegemony and even hostile approach towards the founder, Merek Lama. This problem was compounded by the Drukpas of Bhutan, who also belonged to the Nyingmapa sect, who even tried to invade and take control of Tawang. Hence, when the Tawang monastery was built like a fort structure, a strategic location was chosen from the defense point of view.

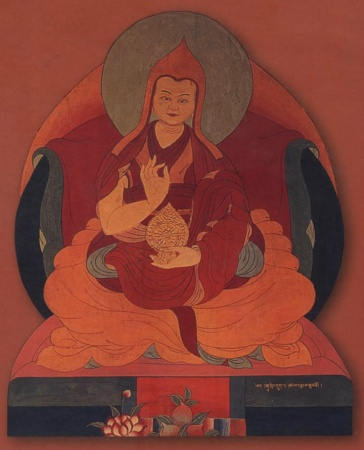
The 6th Dalai Lama

In 1844, Tawang Monastery had entered into two agreements with the East India Company. One agreement, signed on 24 February, pertained to surrender by the Monpas of their right to the Karlapara Duar in return for an annual fee (posa) of Rs 5,000, and another, dated 28 May, related to the Shardukpens to abide by any order of the British administration in India in return for an annual fee of Rs 2,526 and seven annas. Tawang officials used to travel almost to the plains of Assam to collect monastic contributions. According to Pandit Nain Singh of the Trignometrical Survey of India, who visited the monastery in 1874–75, the monastery had a parliamentary form of administration, known as the Kato, with the Chief Lamas of the monastery as its members. It was not dependent on the Dzonpan (head of Tsona Monastery) and Government of Lhasa, and this aspect was supported by G.A. Nevill who had visited the monastery in 1924.

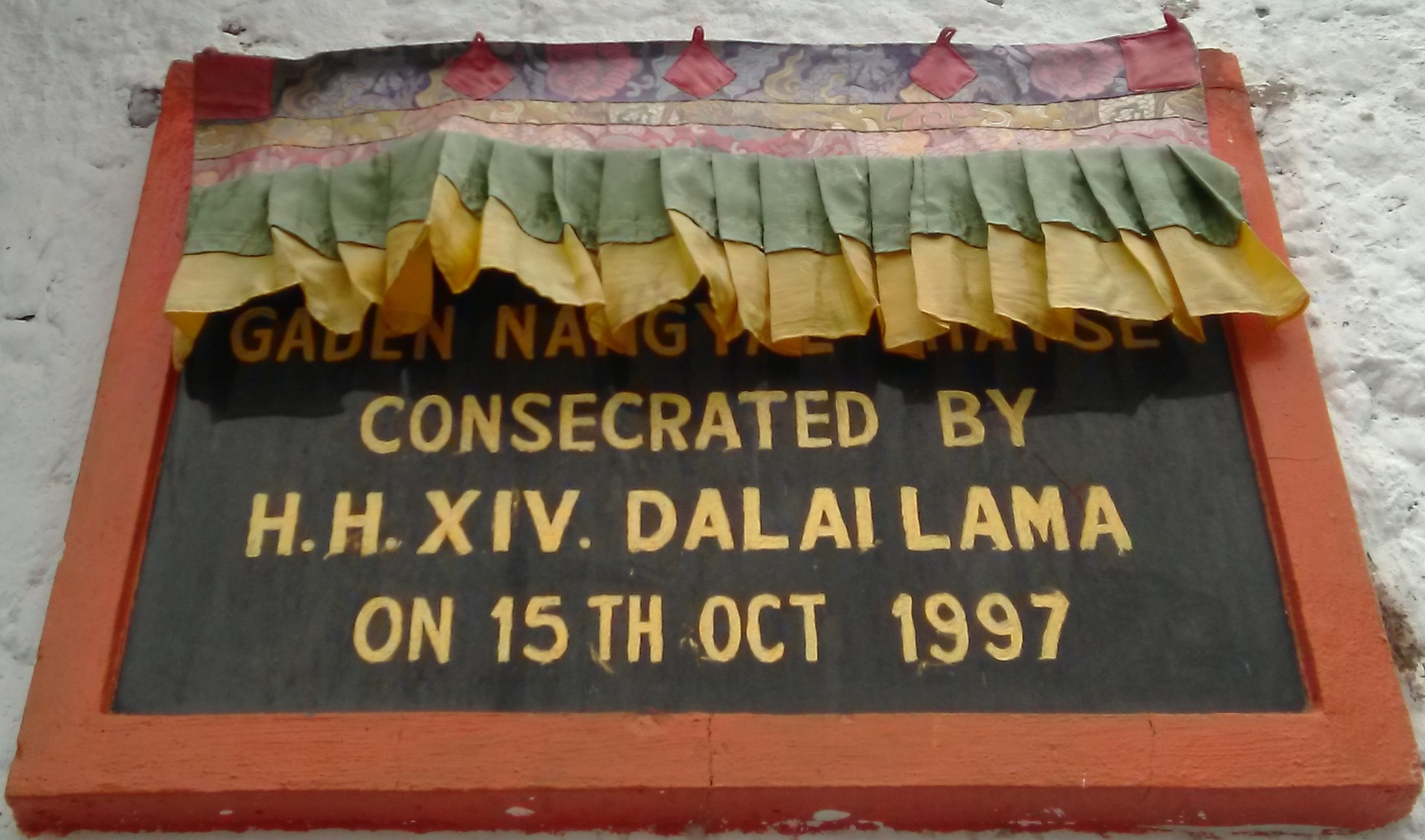
"Gaden Namgyal Lhatse" (Tibetan), consecrated by Tenzin Gyatso, the 14th Dalai Lama of Tibet on 15 October 1997

Until 1914, this region of India was under the control of Tibet. However, under the Simla Agreement of 1913-14, the area came under the control of the British Raj. Tibet gave up several hundred square miles of its territory, including the whole of the Tawang region and the monastery, to the British. This disputed territory was the bone of contention for the 1962 India China war, when China invaded India on 20 October 1962 from the northeastern border, forcing the Indian army to retreat. They occupied Tawang, including the monastery, for six months, but did not desecrate it. China claimed that Tawang belonged to Tibet. It is one of the few monasteries of Tibetan Buddhism that have remained protected from Mao's Cultural Revolution without any damage. Before this war, in 1959, the 14th Dalai Lama had fled from Tibet, and after an arduous journey, crossed into India on 31 March 1959, and had reached Tawang and taken shelter in the monastery for a few days before moving to Tezpur. 50 years later, in spite of strong protests by China, the Dalai Lama's visit on 8 November 2009 to Tawang Monastery was a monumental event to the people of the region, and the abbot of the monastery greeted him with much fanfare and adulation.

As of 2006 the monastery had 400 monks, and the number was reported to be 450 in 2010. Tawang Manuscript Conservation Centre was established in the monastery in August 2006, which has curated 200 manuscripts, and 31 manuscripts have been treated for preservation. In November 2010, it was reported that the monastery was threatened by a risk of landslide, with The Times of India reporting "massive landslides around it". Professor Dave Petley of Durham University in the United Kingdom (UK), an acknowledged landslide expert, wrote: "the northern flank of the site appears to consist of a landslide scarp ... The reasons for this are clear – the river, which flows towards the south, is eroding the toe of the slope due to the site being on the outside of the bend. In the long term, erosion at the toe will need to be prevented if the site is to be preserved."

The monastery currently has control over 17 gompas in West Kameng district. The monastery has administrative control over two dzongs, each headed by a monk; the Darana Dzong built in 1831 and the Sanglem Dzong, also known as Talung Gompa, in the south-west part of Kameng district. These dzongs not only collect taxes but also preach Buddhism to the Monpas and Sherdukpens of Kameng. The monastery owns cultivable lands in the villages of Soma and Nerguit and a few patches in some other villages which are tilled and cultivated by farmers, who share the produce with the monastery. The present resident head of the monastery is the incarnate Gyalsy Rinpochey.

The Dalai Lama also visited Tawang Monastery in 2017.

== Features ==
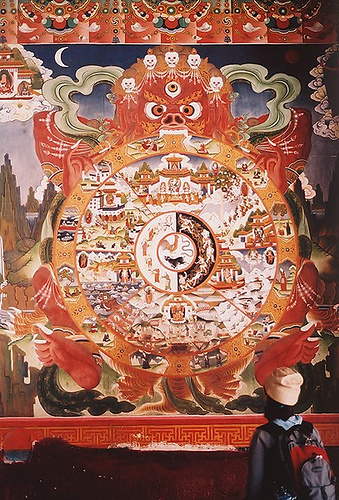
The Mandala at the "Kakaling", the entry gate to the monastery

=== Entrance and outer walls ===
At the entrance to the monastery there is colourful gate structure, known as the Kakaling, which is built in the shape of a "hut-like structure", with side walls built of stone masonry. The roof of the Kakaling features mandalas, while the interior walls have murals of divinities and saints painted on them. A distinctive mural, the ninth mural from the southwest west corner of the southern wall, is of Ningmecahn, the protector deity of the Bon religion, who is considered the guardian deity of the Tawang region. Ahead of the main gate of the Kakaling, to its south, is another entry, an open gate.

The main entrance to the monastery, to the south of the open gate, has massive doors fitted on the northern wall. This outer wall is 925 feet (282 m) in length, with heights varying from about 10–20 feet (3.0–6.1 m). Apart from the main gate, the southern side of the monastery has another entry gate, which also has a massive door. Nearer to the gate, there are two small openings in the wall which provide the complete view of the exterior part of the eastern wall that connects to the Kakaling. According to a legend, the 5th Dalai Lama had given a roll of thread to be bound around the walls of the monastery to denote the extent to which the monastery should be built.

=== Main buildings ===
The monastery, built like a large mansion, is triple storied with a large assembly hall, ten other functional structures and with 65 residential quarters for students, Lamas and monks. The monastery has a school and its own water supply facility, and a centre for Buddhist cultural studies.

The ground floor of the monastery is where ritual dances are performed. The walls of the monastery also have a profusion of thangkas of Buddhist deities and saints. Curtains are suspended over the balcony and these are painted with Buddhist symbols. Within the precincts of the monastery there are residential buildings to accommodate about 700 monks, which now houses 450 monks. The abbot of the monastery resides in a house located near the gate at the southeastern corner of the monastery.

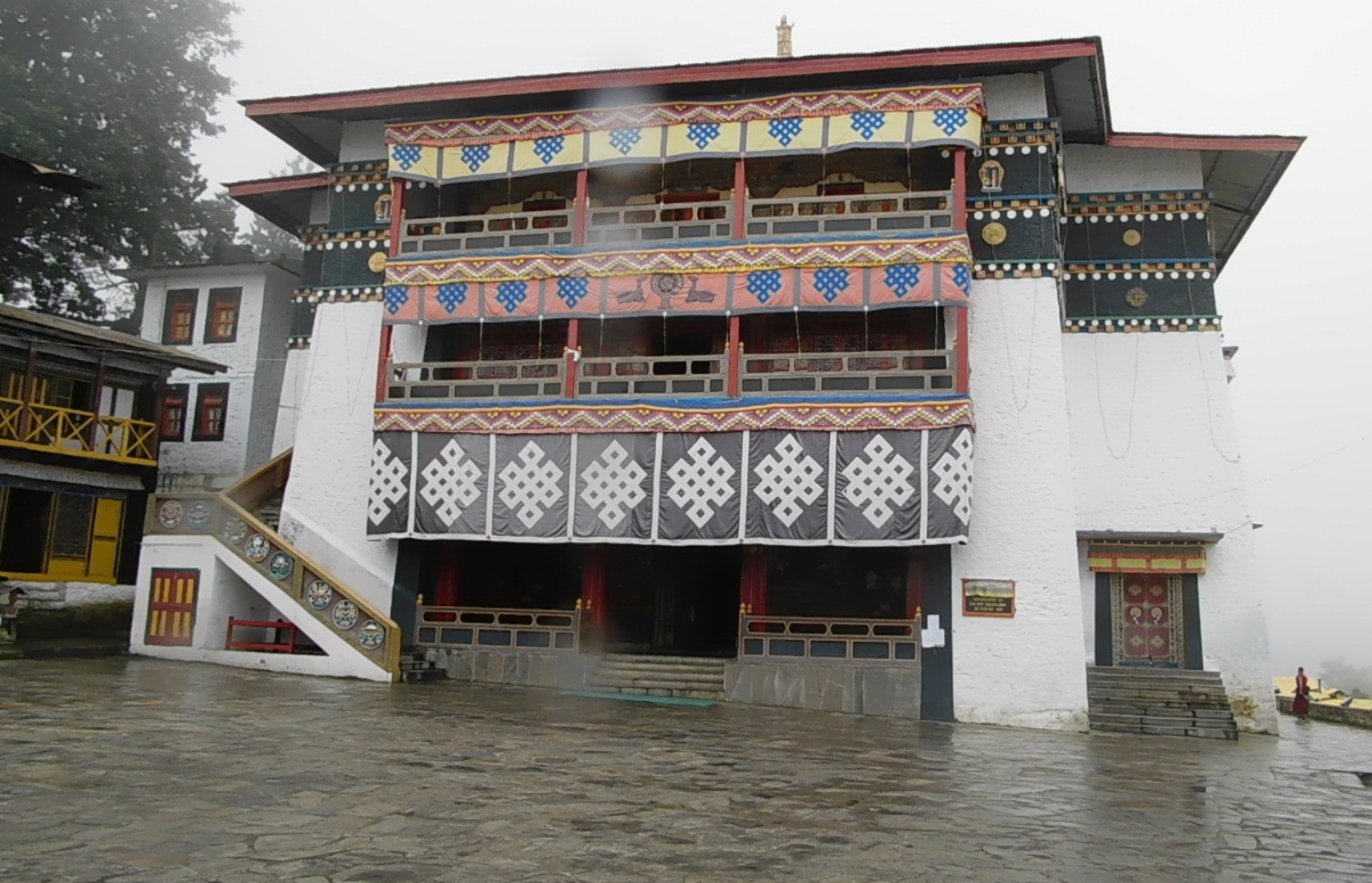
First View of Tawang Monastery

A notable feature on the wall of the front porch on the ground floor is a footprint on a stone slab. It is said that this footprint belonged to a resident of the monastery, who was a water carrier, known as Chitenpa. He served in the monastery for a long time and on one fine day he announced that he had completed his service to the monastery and then stamped his left foot on the stone slab which created a dented formation of his step. This step is venerated as a miracle in view of a belief among the people of the region that such an imprint on a stone slab could only be created by a divine person who was a true devotee of the monastery.

==== Main temple (Dukhang) ====
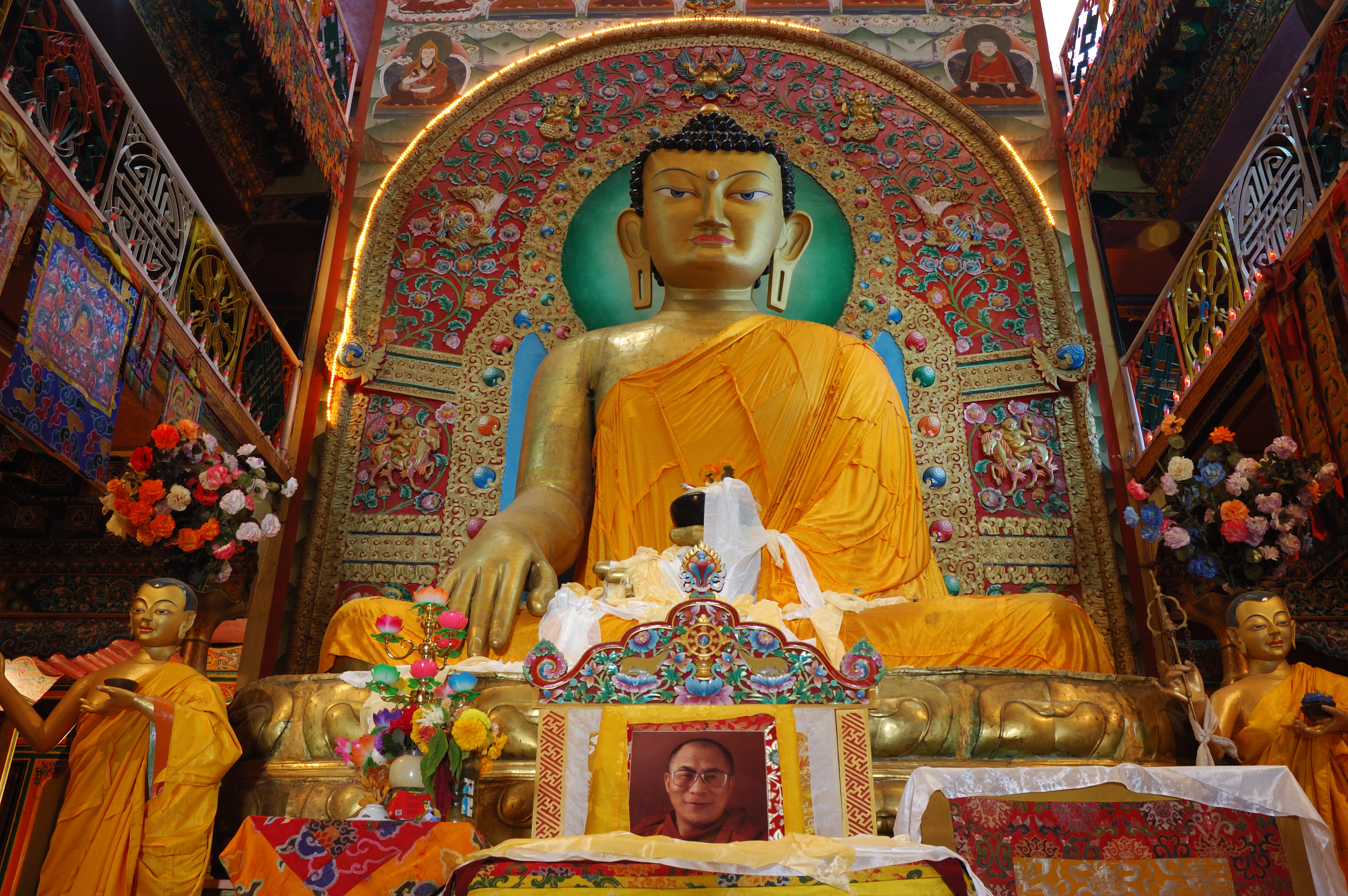
Image of Buddha in the Dukhang.

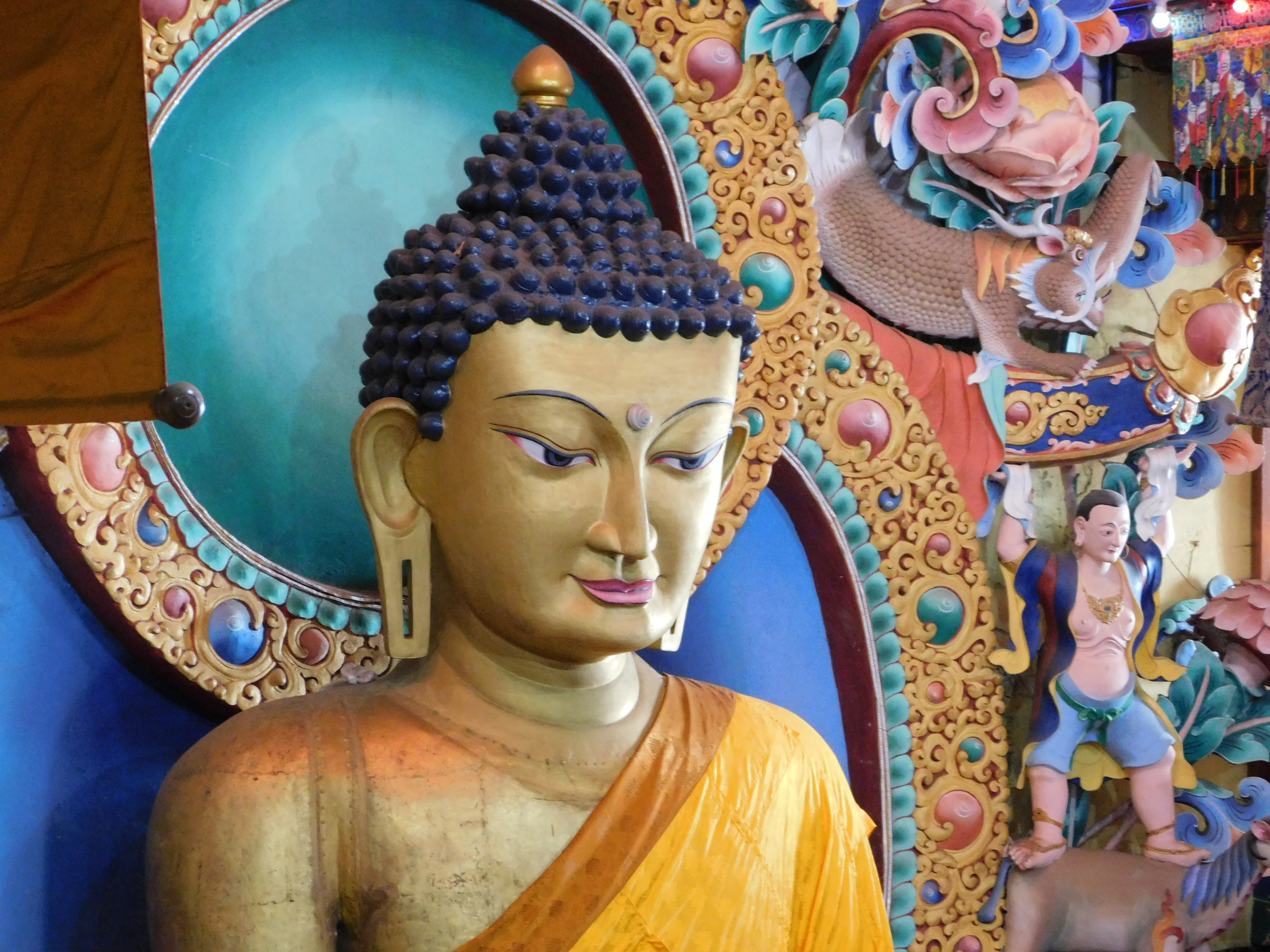
Close view of Buddha Image

The main temple in the monastery, to the west of the entry gate, is known as the Dukhang ('Du' means "assembly" and 'Khang' means "building"). It was built in 1860–61. A large image of Buddha of 18 feet (5.5 m) height is deified; it is gilded and decorated, and is in a lotus position. This image is on the northern face of the assembly hall and is installed over a platform and its head extends up to the first floor. Next to the Buddha image there is a silver casket that holds a special thangka of the goddess Sro Devi (Palden Lhamo), which is the guardian deity of the monastery. It is said that it was painted with the blood drawn from the nose of the 5th Dalai Lama, which renders an ethereal "living quality" to the thanka. This thangka image, also known as Dri Devi, was donated to the monastery by the 5th Dalai Lama. The main temple fell into a dilapidated condition and was renovated in 2002 in the traditional Buddhist architectural style. It has been exquisitely decorated with paintings, murals, carvings, sculptures and so forth.

=== Library and texts ===
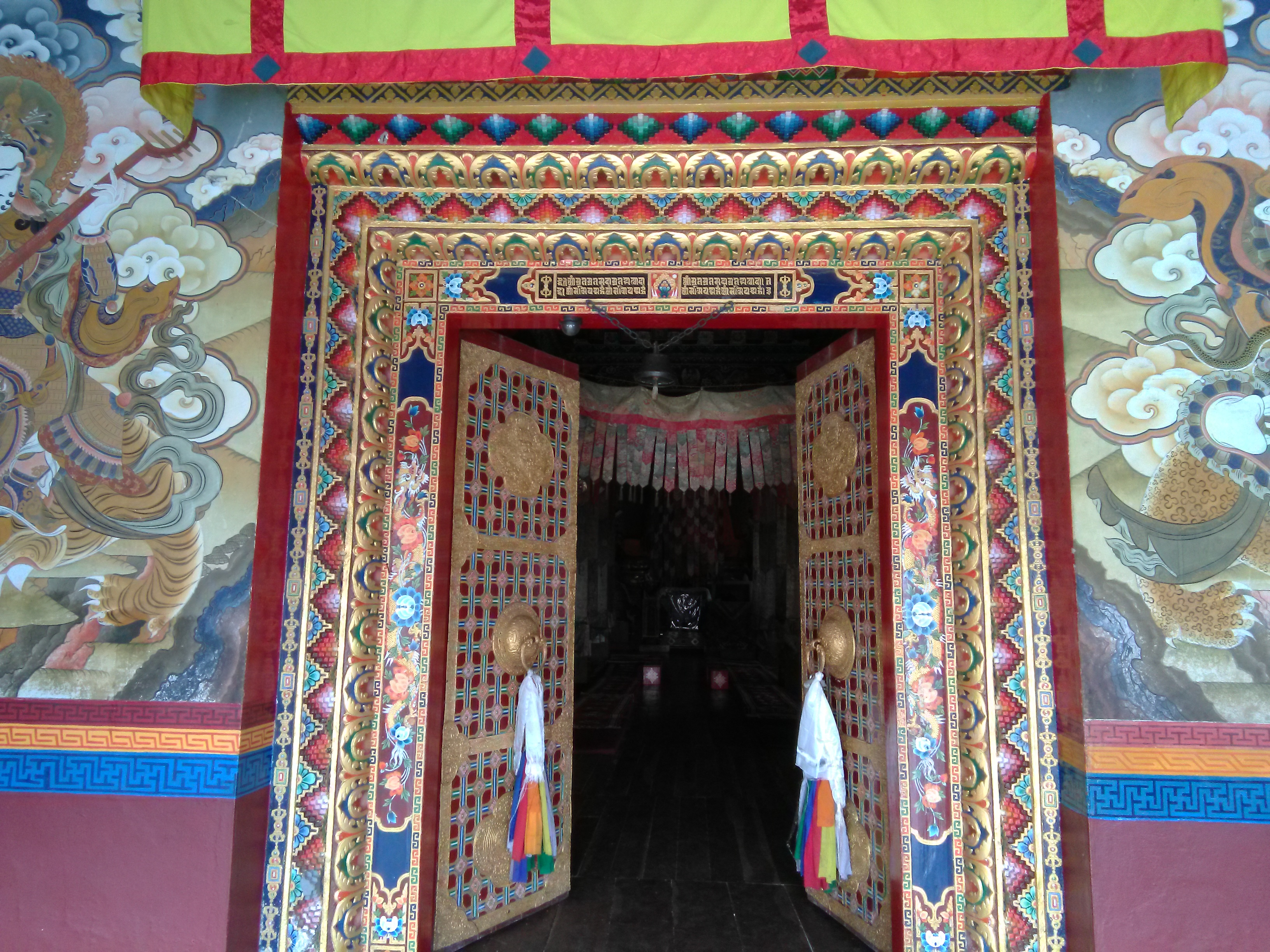
Main entrance to the monastery

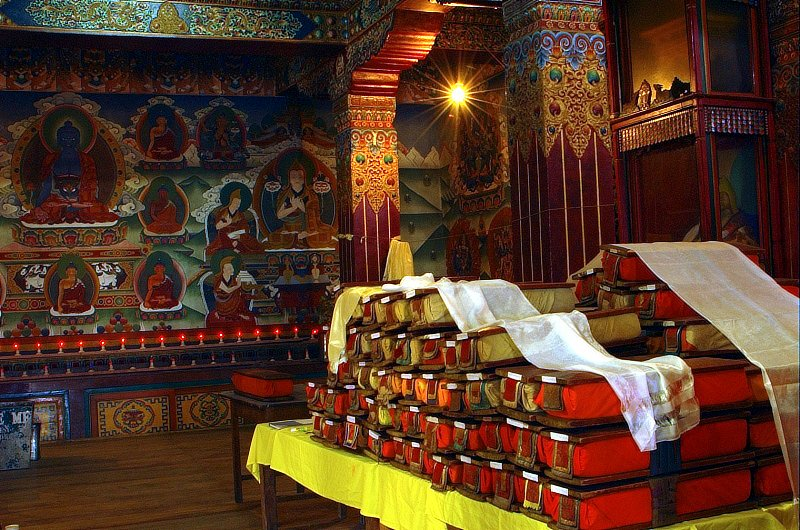
Sacred texts in the library hall of the monastery

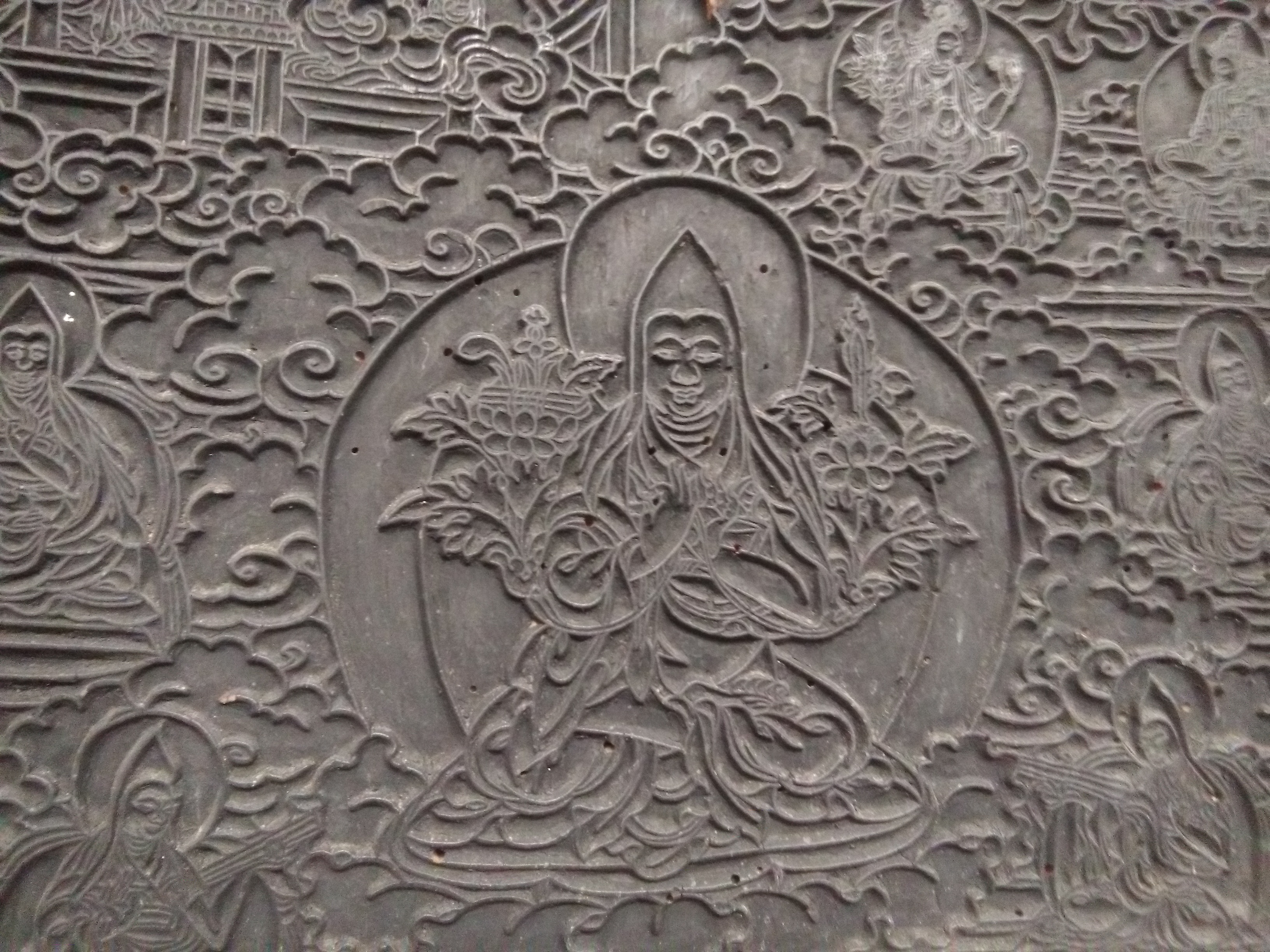
From Monastery Museum

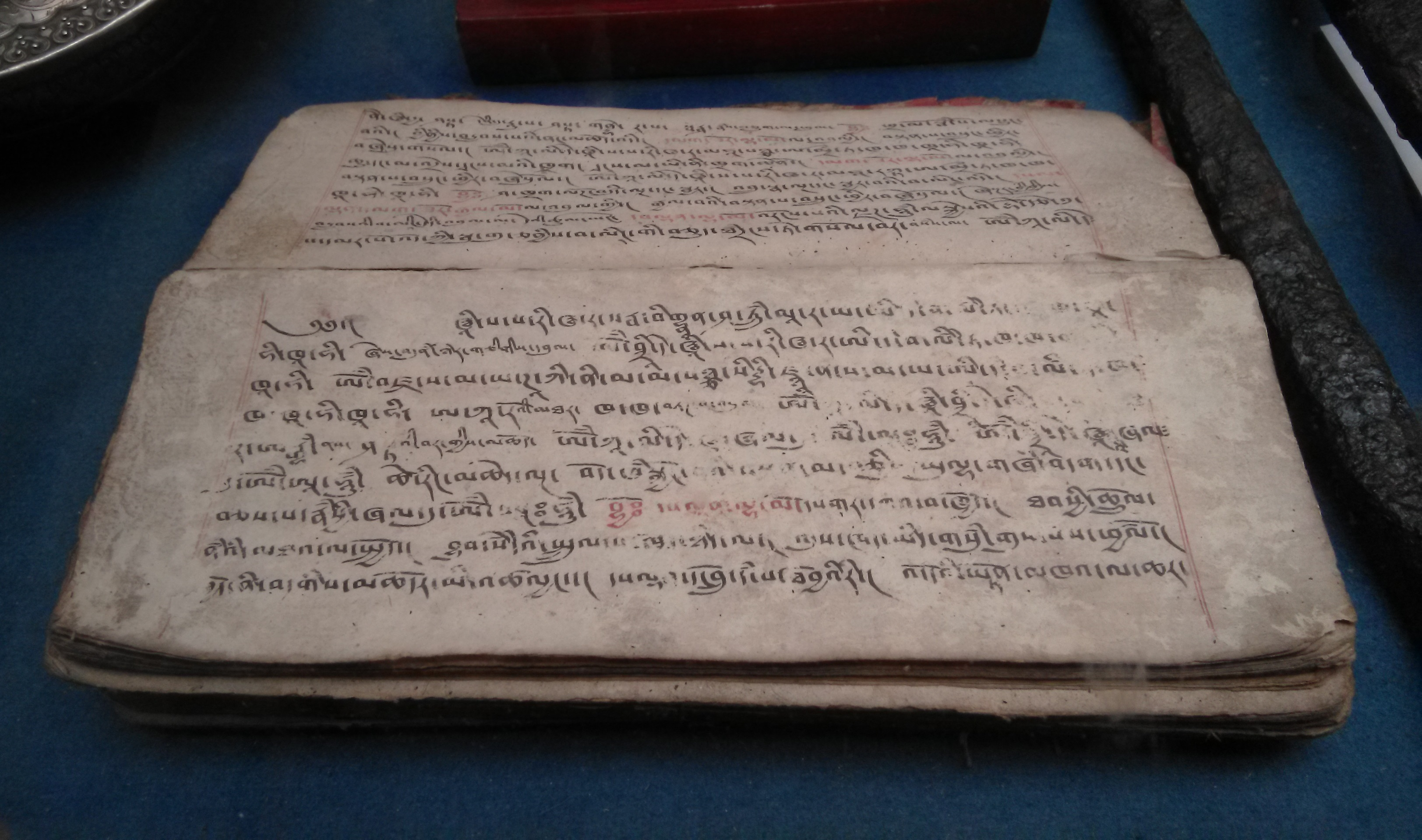
Old religious texts are kept at museum

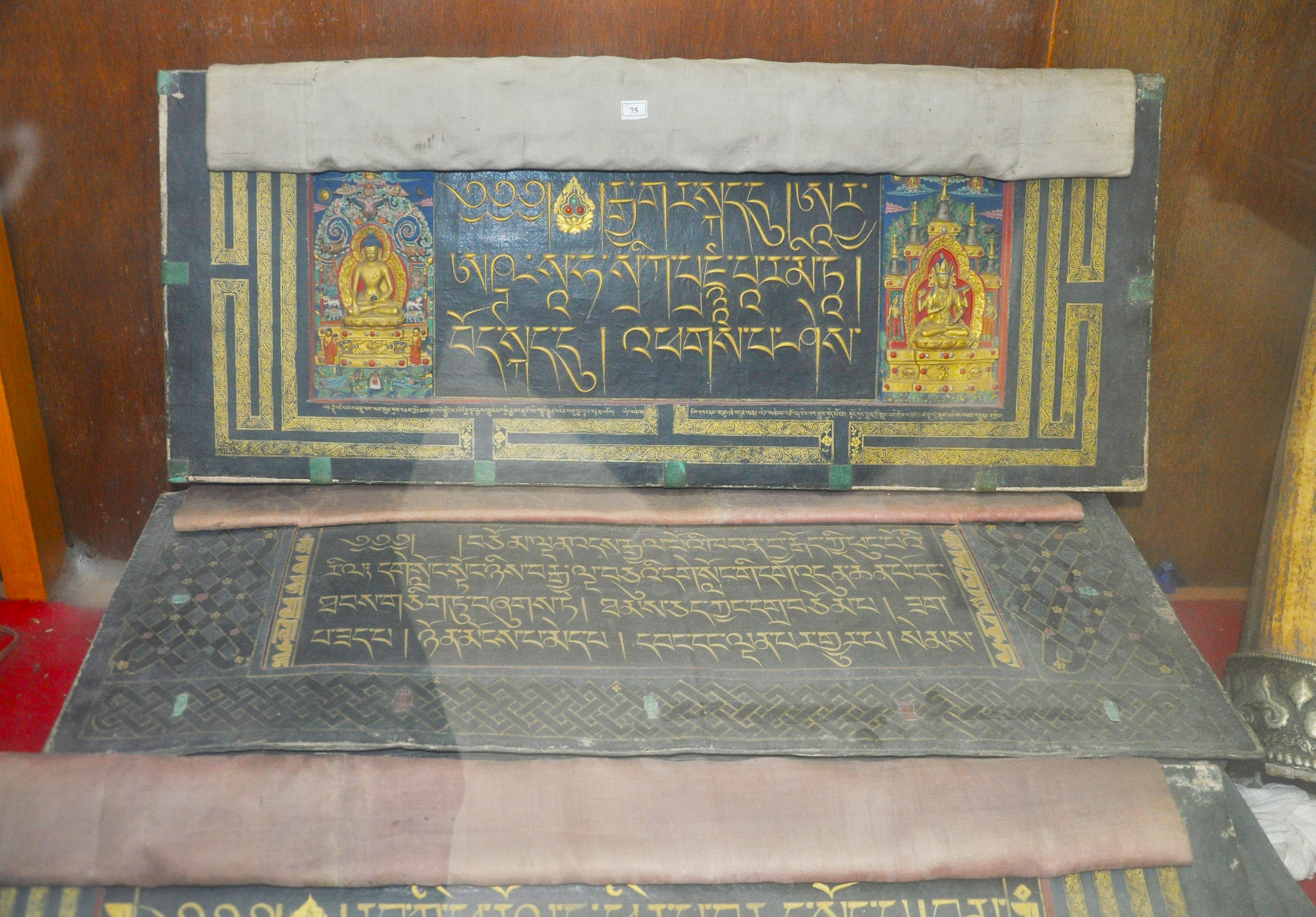
Religious texts with letters in gold at Tawang Monastery

The monastery has a printing press for printing religious books using paper made locally. Wooden blocks are used for printing. The books are used usually by the literate Monpa Lamas who refer to it for conducting religious rituals. The entire second floor houses the library. It contains the scriptures of Gyetengpa, Doduipa, Mamtha, Kangyur, Tengyur and Zungdui, which have been affected due to insect attacks. The collection in the library consists of two printed books of Tengyur (in 25 volumes), which are commentaries on Buddhist teachings; three sets of Kangyur, the translated version of the canons of Buddhist teachings; and Chanjia Sangbhums in five volumes. Of the three sets of Kangyur, two are handwritten and one is printed. The printed sets are in 101 volumes. One handwritten set has 131 volumes and the other 125 volumes; the letters of these 125 books are washed in gold. The religious text, Gyentongpa, has letters washed in gold in all its pages. At some stage, some of the sacred scriptures were lost and the reason was attributed to the monks of the Tsona monastery who used to visit Tawang during winter time. In the past, these monks had demanded that the gilded image of the Buddha be gifted to them. This was not accepted by the Lamas of the Tawang Monastery and as result the Tsona Lamas refused to part with some of the sacred texts and records of the Tawang Monastery which were with them. They again took away more books in 1951.

== Customs and festivals ==
Monpas, who belong to the Gelug sect, are the dominant sect of the Kameng region. Many Monpa boys join the monastery and become monks. When young boys join the monastery to train, it is on the condition that it is a lifetime commitment. If a monk wishes to leave the monastery, a heavy penalty is levied. According to a past custom, in a family of three sons, the middle son was conscripted to the monastery and in a family of two sons the youngest son was inducted into the monastery.

The main Monpa festivals held in the monastery are the Choksar, Losar, Ajilamu, and Torgya. Choksar is the festival when the Lamas recite religious scriptures in the monasteries. Following the religious recitations, the villagers carry the scriptures on their back and circumambulate their agricultural land seeking blessings for the good yield of crops without any infestations by pests and to protect against attack by wild animals. In the Losar festival, which marks the beginning of the Tibetan New Year, people visit the monastery and offer prayers. Torgya, also known as Tawang-Torgya, is an annual festival that is exclusively held in the monastery. It is held according to the Buddhist calendar days of 28th to 30th of Dawachukchipa, which corresponds to 10 to 12 January of the Gregorian calendar, and is a Monpa celebration. The objective of the festival is to ward off evil spirits and ushering all round prosperity and happiness to the people in the ensuing year. During the three-day festival, dances performed by artists in colorful costumes and masks are held in the courtyard, including the Pha Chan and the Losjker Chungiye, the latter of which is performed by the monks of the monastery. Each dance represents a myth and costumes and masks represent animal forms such as cows, tigers, sheep, monkeys and so forth.

== Bibliography ==
- Arpi, Claude i (1962). 1962 and the McMahon Line Saga. Lancer Publishers LLC. ISBN 978-1-935501-57-2.
- Bareh, Hamlet (2001). Encyclopaedia of North-East India. Mittal Publications. ISBN 978-81-7099-788-7.
- Bisht, Ramesh Chandra (1 January 2008). International Encyclopaedia Of Himalayas (5 Vols. Set). Mittal Publications. ISBN 978-81-8324-265-3.
- Bose, Manilal (1997). History of Arunachal Pradesh. Concept Publishing Company. ISBN 978-81-7022-666-6.
- Dalal, Roshen (2010). The Religions of India: A Concise Guide to Nine Major Faiths. Penguin Books India. ISBN 978-0-14-341517-6.
- Das, Gautam (2009). China-Tibet-India: The 1962 War and the Strategic Military Future. Har-Anand Publications. ISBN 978-81-241-1466-7.
- Kapadia, Harish; Kapadia, Geeta (2005). Into the Untravelled Himalaya: Travels, Treks, and Climbs. Indus Publishing. ISBN 978-81-7387-181-8.
- Kler, Gurdip Singh (1995). Unsung Battles of 1962. Lancer Publishers. ISBN 978-1-897829-09-7.
- Kohli, M.S. (2002). Mountains of India: Tourism, Adventure and Pilgrimage. Indus Publishing. ISBN 978-81-7387-135-1.
- Mibang, Tamo; Chaudhuri, Sarit Kumar (2004). Understanding Tribal Religion. Mittal Publications. ISBN 978-81-7099-945-4.
- Mullin, Glenn H. The Practice of the Six Yogas of Naropa. Snow Lion Publications. ISBN 978-1-55939-905-0.
- Pal, Susant (5 February 2014). Imbibed In Faith. Author Solutions, Incorporated. ISBN 978-1-4828-1259-6.
- Pathak, Guptajit; Gogoi, Raju (2008). Cultural fiesta in the "Island of peace" Arunachal Pradesh. Mittal Publications. ISBN 978-81-8324-231-8.
- Richardson, Hugh (1984). Tibet and Its History. Shambhala. ISBN 978-0-87773-376-8.
- Shakya, Tsering (29 February 2012). Dragon In The Land Of Snows: The History of Modern Tibet since 1947. Random House. ISBN 978-1-4481-1429-0.
