= Madhav Shrihari Aney =

Indian politician (1880–1968)

Loknayak Bapuji Madhav Shrihari Aney
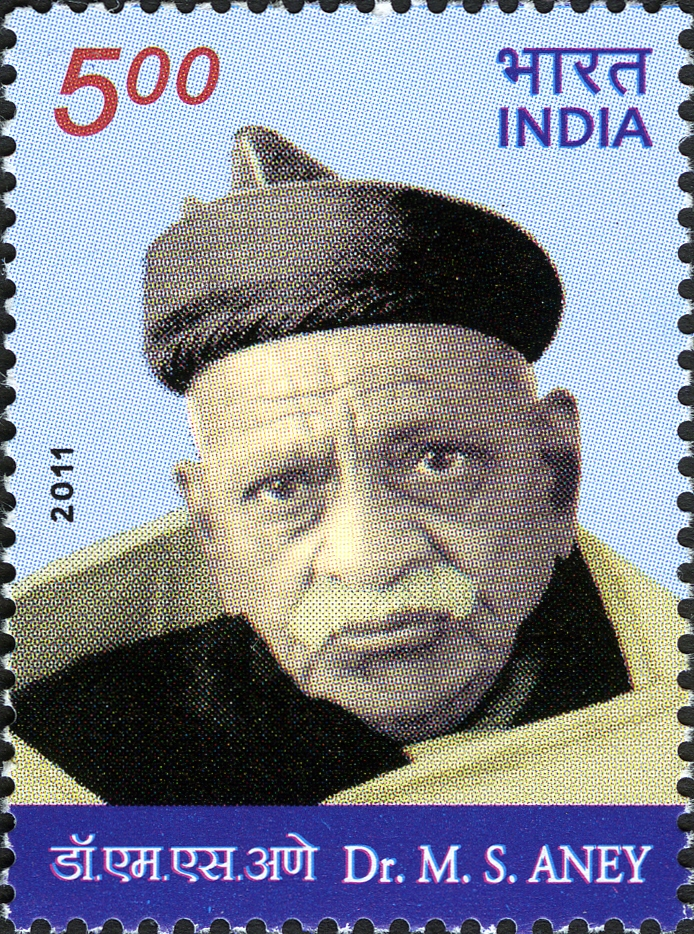

Member of Parliament, Lok Sabha
- In office 1962–1967
- Preceded by: Anasuyabai Kale
- Succeeded by: Narendra R. Deoghare
- Constituency: Nagpur

2nd Governor of Bihar
- In office 12 January 1948 – 14 June 1952
- Chief Minister: Shri Krishna Sinha
- Preceded by: Jairamdas Daulatram
- Succeeded by: R. R. Diwakar

Member of the Viceroy's Executive Council
- In office 1941–1943
- Monarch: George VI
- Governor-General: Victor Hope, 2nd Marquess of Linlithgow

Personal details
- Born: 29 August 1880 Wani, Berar Province, Hyderabad State, British India (present-day Maharashtra, India)
- Died: 26 January 1968 (aged 87)
- Cause of death: Myocardial Infarction
- Party: Congress Nationalist Party
- Other political affiliations: Indian National Congress
- Spouse: Yamuna Bai (m. 1898; died 1925)
- Children: 4
- Education: Morris College (B.A., 1902) Calcutta University (LL.B, 1907)
- Occupation: Author, politician, freedom fighter
- Known for: Role in the Indian Independence movement
- Awards: Padma Vibhushan (1968)

Madhav Shrihari Aney (29 August 1880 – 26 January 1968), popularly referred to as Loknayak Bapuji Aney or Bapuji Aney, was an ardent educationist, freedom fighter, statesman, a modern Sanskrit poet and a politician. He was also conferred with the title of "Loknayak Bapuji", which means "The People's Leader and Respected Father". He was one of the founders of the Congress Nationalist Party. He was first among the eminent disciples of Bal Gangadhar Tilak such as Narasimha Chintaman Kelkar, Krushnaji Prabhakar Khadilkar, Gangadhar Deshpande, B. S. Moonje, Moreshwar Vasudeo Abhyankar, T B Paranjpe and Vaman Malhar Joshi, who walked in the footsteps of Tilak. Accepting the leadership of Mahatma Gandhi on the death of Bal Gangadhar Tilak. Aney persuaded his colleagues to see the writing on the wall. At the same time he was not blind in his loyalty. He disapproved Congress throwing itself in Khilafat Movement and warned against excessive wooing of Muslims at the cost of national interests. He regarded unity at any price as elusive and dangerous. Since the best safeguard for the minority was the goodwill of the majority. He never permitted his critical faculties to be blurred by emotion. Mahatma Gandhi admiring his calm logic, confided in him and often sought his counsel. He was chosen to arbitrate the disputes between Subhas Chandra Bose and Jatindra Mohan Sengupta. He was never a breaker or a destroyer but was always a cementing factor believing in synthesis and not in segregation.

== Biography ==
=== Early life and background ===
Bapuji Aney was born on 20 August 1880 in a family of Sanskrit pandits at Wani in Yavatmal district of Vidarbha in Maharashtra. His father Shrihari Aney was a learned pandit and mother Rakhma Bai Aney, a housewife. Bapuji Aney was second of their four sons. He came from a Deshastha Brahmin family. It is said that his ancestors hailed from Telugu-speaking area Annamwar, originating in Telangana. It is believed that their surname may be "Annawar", the name of the village, which was later transmuted into "Aney" (IAST: Aṇe). He was initiated into vedic studies early in life and soon ripened into profound Sanskrit scholar. He completed his B.A. from Morris College in Nagpur in 1902 and was a teacher in Kashibai Private School, Amravati in 1907. After taking his law degree from Calcutta University in 1907, he joined the bar in 1910 at Yavatmal, where he built a lucrative practice. He used to attend courts for two weeks in a month and devout rest of the time to public work. He wrote for the paper 'Harikishor' in 1910 and was prosecuted for writing against the British government and was punished with cancellation of his Sanad to practice law for 1 year. In 1911 he accompanied Bal Gangadhar Tilak when the latter campaigned in Vidarbha. Tilak was Aney's political guru, and Aney's politics was an application of Tilak's ideology.

=== Political career and social life ===
1918- Aney joined Home Rule League 1918- He founded Lokmat paper in Yavatmal, which was later acquired by Jawaharlal Darda in 1952 1921- He was elected President Vidarbha Pradesh Congress Committee, and joined the Civil Disobedience Movement. The British government cancelled his Sanad to practice law, which ended his legal practice. During the time he practiced, as he was frequently imprisoned, the lawyers from Yavatmal Bar to which he belonged would give him their briefs to argue, to enable him to earn his fees. So loved was he that his home in Yavatmal, which now houses The Loknayak Aney Mahila Mahavidyalaya, a women's college, was built from the contributions of the members of the Yavatmal bar. On 1.1.1922- became President of the Varhad unit of Swatantra Party of Motilal Nehru and Chittaranjan Das. In 1923, Aney was elected to the Central Provinces Legislative Assembly Also in 1923 he established the Vidarbha Shitya Sangh. In 1924, Aney joined the Congress as Member, Congress Committee. In 1928 he was elected President Maharashtra Sahitya Sangh at its Gwalior convention. He established New English High School, Yavatmal (now Loknayak Bapuji Aney Vidyalaya, Yavatmal) in 1928. During 1928-29 Aney was Secretary of the Nehru Committee. Nehru Committee Report of 10 August 1928 was a memorandum outlining a proposed new dominion status for the constitution for India. It was prepared by a committee of the All Parties Conference chaired by Motilal Nehru with his son Jawaharlal Nehru acting as secretary. There were nine other members in this committee. The final report was signed by Motilal Nehru, Ali Imam, Tej Bahadur Sapru, Madhav Shrihari Aney, Mangal Singh, Shuaib Qureshi, Subhas Chandra Bose, and G. R. Pradhan. Shuaib Qureshi disagreed with some of the recommendations. On 28.4.1930, in expression of solidarity to Mahatma Gandhi's Salt March, Aney resigned from the Legislative Assembly, and on 10.0.1930, took part in the Jungle Satyagraha at a forest outside Pusad (see below), where he was arrested with his associates. He was convicted for theft of forest product, and imprisoned for 6 months. After this incident, he was known as 'Loknayak'. From 1930 to 1942 he took part in 'Bharat Chodo' (Quit India Movement). He was made a Member, Congress Working Committee in 1931. In 1933 he became President of the Indian National Congress. In 1938, Aney was appointed Vice Chancellor, Tilak Maharashtra Vidyappeeth. In 1941 he was appointed as Member on the Viceroy's Council under Lord Linlithgow, and was incharge of Overseas Indians & Commonwealth relations Portfolio. Aney, Homi Mody and N.R.Sarkar, B. R. Ambedkar and others resigned from the Viceroy's Counsel in support of Mahatma's fast unto death in 1942. From 1943 to 1947 Aney was India's High Commissioner to Sri Lanka. In 1948, when the Constituent Assembly was convened to frame Constitution of India, the Princely States of Central India nominated Loknayak Aney as their representative on the Constituent Assembly. In 1948, following Jairamdas Daulatram who was governor from 15.8.1947 to 11.1.1948, Loknayak Aney became the Governor of Bihar. He was Governor from 12.1.1948 to 14.6.1952.He was so loved and respected, that one of the most important roads in Patna on which is The official residence of Chief Minister of Bihar is on the road named after Loknayak Aney. (The address is wrongly referred to as 1 Anne Marg instead of 1 Aney Marg). In 1952, while he was Governor, Loknayak Aney fell seriously ill from spinal Tuberculosis. He was completely bed-ridden and had to lie in a plaster cast for many months. He was moved from Patna to his brother-in-law's home Dr.Krishnaji Atmaram Nulkar's home in Sadashiv Peth, Pune. where Dr. Nulkar attended to Loknayak Aney's recovery which took over 4 years. Even in this bedridden condition, he performed the Vajapaya Yagna at Pune. During the period of his illness, Fazal Ali Commission was appointed for the First Reorganisation of States. Although bed-ridden, in 1954 Aney submitted a Memorandum to the Commission called 'Memorandum for Statehood for Vidarbha' which set out in great detail the case for statehood for Vidarbha, pointing out to its historical, geographic, socio-political and economic claim for the status of a State in the Indian Union. The Fazal Ali Commission recommended creation of the State of Vidarbha which would largely be the same as the existing State of C.P, which by then was called Madhya Pradesh, with Nagpur as its capital. The recommendation was accepted by the Ministry of Home. However, when formation of states were announced on 1.11.1956, Vidarbha was not created. This led to a popular uprising for Vidarbha state, which was headed by Loknayak Aney and Brajlal Biyani, who formed the Nag Vidarbha Andolan Samiti. After recovering from his prolonged illness, Loknayak Aney won the 1959 bye-election to Nagpur Lok Sabha constituency to the 2nd Lok Sabha on a Congress ticket. However, in the 1962 general election, he refused to contest on the Congress ticket and fought as a Nag Vidarbha Andolan Samiti candidate and won Nagpur Lok Sabha constituency with 1,31,740 votes defeating Shri Rikhabchand Sharma (Congress) with 84,870 votes. Jawaharlal Nehru who had visited Nagpur to campaign for the Congress candidate Shri Sharma refused to speak against Loknayak Aney at the public meeting organised for the candidate. From 1959 to 1966 Loknayak Aney sat as Member of the 3rd Loksabha. In 1967 he lost the Nagpur seat to N.R.Deoghare (INC) with 1,29736, followed by A. Bhardhan (CPI) with 97,767 and Aney with 54,049 votes

=== Forest Satyagraha ===
The forest law was defied in Berar as in other parts of the country. Moreshwar Vasudeo Abhyankar and Wamanrao Joshi were arrested for their protests. On 10 July 1930, Bapuji Aney took over the leadership to inaugurate the "Forest Satyagraha". With the party of volunteers, he cut grass from the reserved forests at Pusad at Yavatmal and was arrested. He was charged with the offence of 'Theft' under Section 379 and was convicted. At the same time, other leaders of the Berar, such as Brajlal Biyani, Gole, Patwardhan and Soman were also arrested. With this, the Satyagraha started spreading in all the parts of the state of Central Provinces and Berar. The Gond and other Adivasi tribals too participated in thousands in the Satyagraha. Aney underwent six months imprisonment and thereafter he was known as "Loknayak Aney."

== Positions held ==
=== During British Raj ===
In 1923, he was nominated to the Central Legislative Assembly as the representative of Berar Division. During 1941–1943, he was a member of the Viceroy's Executive Council responsible for Indians Overseas and Commonwealth Relations. He resigned in 1943, when the British Indian government refused to release Mahatma Gandhi, while he was on fast. He was the High Commissioner to Ceylon from 1943 to July 1947. He joined the Constituent Assembly in 1947.

=== After Independence of India ===
After Indian independence, Dr. Aney was the Governor of Bihar from 12 January 1948 to 14 June 1952. He was also a member of the 3rd Lok Sabha from 1962 to 1967, representing Nagpur Lok Sabha constituency.

== Death ==
He died on 26 January 1968 evening from a severe heart attack.

== Awards ==
- On 26 January 1968, the day he died, he was honoured with Padma Vibhushan.
- In 1973, he was posthumously honoured with the Sahitya Akademi Award for Sanskrit for his Shritilakayashornava (1971), a Sanskrit biography of Bal Gangadhar Tilak.

== Family ==
Bapuji Aney married to Yamuna Bai in 1898 and had two sons and two daughters. Yamuna Bai died in 1925. His eldest son Dattatraya was District Judge, and retired as Secretary, Maharashtra Legislature. His youngest son Ganesh retired as Director Personnel, TISCO, Jamshedpur. His grandson Shreehari Aney was the former Advocate General of Maharashtra. His second grandson Mahesh Aney is a cinematographer who received the President's Award for 'Swades' as best Cinematographer.

== Legacy ==
1, Aney Marg, the street on which the Chief Minister of Bihar's residence is located, is named after him.

== Bibliography ==
- Sinha, Biswajit (1996). Encyclopaedia of Indian Writers: Akademi Laurels. Eastern Book Linkers. ISBN 9788186339312.
- Rao, P. Rajeswar (1991). The Great Indian Patriots, Volume 1. Mittal Publications. ISBN 9788170992806.
- Baker, David E. U. (1979). Changing political leadership in an Indian province: the Central Provinces and Berar, 1919-1939. Oxford University Press. ISBN 9780195611359.
- Shabbir, S. (2005). History of Educational Development in Vidarbha, 1882-1923 A.D. Northern Book Centre. ISBN 9788172111878.

Government offices
Preceded by Jairamdas Daulatram	Governor of Bihar; 12 January 1948 – 14 June 1952	Succeeded by R. R. Diwakar
