= Congress Nationalist Party =

- Founder: Madan Mohan Malaviya along with Madhav Shrihari Aney
- Founded: 1934
- Split from: Indian National Congress
- Ideology: Indian nationalism Anti-socialism; Conservatism; Social conservatism Secularism
- Political position: Centre-right
- ECI Status: Dissolved

The Congress Nationalist Party was a political party in British India. It was founded by Madan Mohan Malaviya and Madhav Shrihari Aney in 1934.

The Communal Award was announced in 1932 to grant separate electorates to minority communities in Indian legislatures. In protest against the Communal Award, Malaviya and Aney split away from the Indian National Congress and started the Congress Nationalist Party. The party contested the 1934 elections to the central legislature and won 12 seats. The Congress and the Nationalists together formed the majority in the Central Legislative Assembly. By 1941, it was the main opposition party in the assembly.
