= Claude Arpi =

French writer and tibetologist (born 1949)

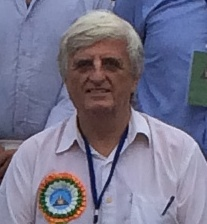
Claude Arpi, 2014

Claude Arpi is French-born author, journalist, and tibetologist born in 1949 in Angoulême who lives in Auroville, India. He is the author of several books including The Fate of Tibet: When Big Insects Eat Small Insects, and several articles on Tibet, China, India and Indo-French relations.

Claude Arpi is the director of the Pavilion of Tibetan Culture at Auroville. The 14th Dalai Lama inaugurated the Pavilion, with Claude Arpi in attendance, on 20 January 2009.

== Bibliography ==
India–Tibet Relations (1947–1962) series:

- Tibet: When the Gods Spoke. India Tibet Relations (1947–1962), Part 3, Vij Books, 2019. ISBN 9388161564
- Will Tibet Ever Find Her Soul Again? India Tibet Relations (1947–1962), Part 2, Vij Books, 2018. ISBN 8193759184
- Tibet: The Last Months of a Free Nation. India Tibet Relations (1947–1962), Part 1, Vij Books, 2017. ISBN 9386457210

Other:

- 1962 and the McMahon Line Saga, Lancer Publishers, 2013. ISBN 9781935501572
- India and her neighbourhood: a French observer's views, Har-Anand Publications, 2005. ISBN 978-81-241-1097-3
- Born in Sin : The Panchsheel Agreement, The Sacrifice of Tibet, Mittal Publications, New Delhi, 2004. ISBN 9788170999744
- Cachemire, le paradis perdu, Éditions Philippe Picquier, 2004 (in French). ISBN 2-87730-742-5
- Il y a 50 ans : Pondichéry, Éditions Auroville Press, Auroville, 2004
- Long and dark shall be the night : the Karma of Tibet, Éditions Auroville Press, Auroville, 2002. ISBN 8187373237
- La politique française de Nehru, La fin des comptoirs français en Inde (1947–1954), Éditions Auroville Press, Auroville, 2002
- Tibet, le pays sacrifié, préfacé par le Dalaï Lama, Calmann-Lévy, 2000. ISBN 2-7021-3132-8.
- The Fate of Tibet: When Big Insects Eat Small Insects, Har-Anand Publications, New Delhi, 1999. ISBN 9788124106389
