= List of governors of Madhya Pradesh =

Governors of Madhya Pradesh state

Governor of Madhya Pradesh
- Emblem of Madhya Pradesh

- Flag of India

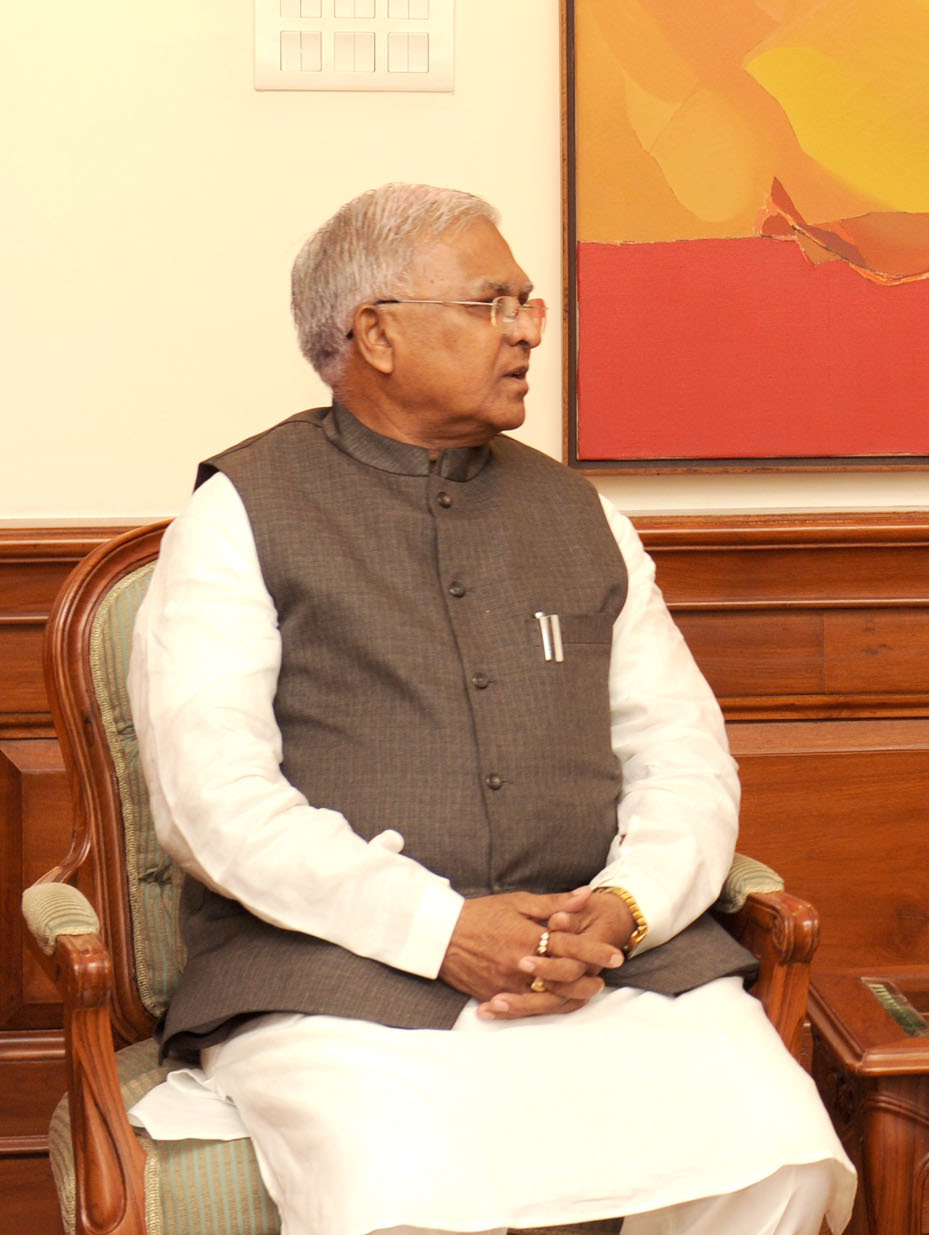
- Incumbent; Mangubhai C. Patel since 8 July 2021
- Style: His Excellency
- Status: Head of State
- Residence: Raj Bhavan, Bhopal (primary); Raj Bhavan, Pachmarhi (summer)
- Appointer: President of India
- Term length: At the pleasure of the president
- Inaugural holder: Pattabhi Sitaramayya
- Formation: 1 November 1956; 70 years ago
- Website: http://governor.mp.gov.in

The governor of Madhya Pradesh is the nominal head of the Indian state of Madhya Pradesh. The governor is appointed by the president of India. There are 22 governors.

Below is a list of governors of the Central Provinces and Berar and the precursor offices associated with that title:

== Predecessor ==
=== Chief commissioners of Nagpur Province and Saugor Nerbudda territories ===
- 1861–1862: Edward King Elliot

=== Chief commissioners of the Central Provinces ===
- 1862–1864: Edward King Elliot
- 1864–1867: Sir Richard Temple, Bt.
- 1867–1883: Sir John Henry Morris
- 1883–1884: William Brittain Jones
- 1884–1885: Sir Charles Haukes Todd
- 1885–1887: Dennis Fitzpatrick
- 1887–1889: Alexander Mackenzie
- 1889–1893: Sir Antony Patrick Macdonnell
- 1893–1895: Sir John Woodburn
- 1895–1898: Sir Charles James Lyall
- 1898–1899: Sir Denzil Charles Jelf Ibbetson
- 1899–1902: Sir Andrew Henderson Leith Fraser
- 1902–1904: John Prescott Hewett
- 1904–1905: Frederic Styles Philpin Lely
- 1905–1906: John Ontario Miller
- 1907–1912: Reginald Henry Craddock
- 1912–1920: Sir Benjamin Robertson
- 1920: Sir Frank George Sly

=== Governors of the Central Provinces ===
- 1920–1925: Sir Frank George Sly
- 1925–1932: Sir Montagu Sherard Dawes Butler
- 1932–1936: Sir Hyde Clarendon Gowan

=== Governors of the Central Provinces and Berar ===
- 1936–1938: Sir Hyde Clarendon Gowan (Edpuganti Raghavendra Rao from 15.05.1936 to 11.09.1936 Acting governor in place of Gowan)
- 11.09.1936–03.03.1938: Sir Hyde Clarendon Gowan
- 03.03.1938–27.05.1938: Sir Hugh Bomford (acting)
- 01.06.1938–01.07.1940: Sir Francis Verner Wylie
- 17.09.1940–16.09.1946: Sir Henry Joseph Twynam
- 16.09.1946–15.08.1947: Sir Frederick Chalmers Bourne

== List ==
Legend

- ^{†} Died in office
- ^{§} Transferred
- ^{‡} Resigned/removed

Color key

- indicates acting/additional charge

#	Portrait	Name (born – died)	Home state	Tenure in office			Appointer (President)
#	Portrait	Name (born – died)	Home state	From	To	Time in office	Appointer (President)
1		Bhogaraju Pattabhi Sitaramayya (1880–1959)	Andhra Pradesh	1 November 1956	13 June 1957^{[‡]}	224 days	Rajendra Prasad
2		Hari Vinayak Pataskar (1892–1970)	Bombay State	14 June 1957	10 February 1965	7 years, 241 days	Rajendra Prasad
3		K. Chengalaraya Reddy (1902–1976)	Mysore State	11 February 1965	2 February 1966	356 days	Sarvepalli Radhakrishnan
4		Justice; P. V. Dixit (Acting)	Madhya Pradesh	3 February 1966	9 February 1966	6 days	Sarvepalli Radhakrishnan
5		K. Chengalaraya Reddy (1902–1976)	Mysore State	10 February 1966	7 March 1971	5 years, 25 days	Sarvepalli Radhakrishnan
6		Satya Narayan Sinha (1900–1983)	Bihar	8 March 1971	13 October 1977	6 years, 219 days	V. V. Giri
7		N. N. Wanchoo; ICS (Retd) (1910–1982)	Madhya Pradesh	14 October 1977	16 August 1978	306 days	Neelam Sanjiva Reddy
8		C. M. Poonacha (1910–1990)	Karnataka	17 August 1978	29 April 1980^{[§]} (Note: Transferred as the Governor of Orissa)	1 year, 256 days	Neelam Sanjiva Reddy
9		Bhagwat Dayal Sharma (1918–1993)	Haryana	30 April 1980	25 May 1981	1 year, 25 days	Neelam Sanjiva Reddy
10		Justice; Guru Prasanna Singh (1922–2013) (Acting)	Madhya Pradesh	26 May 1981	9 July 1981	44 days	Neelam Sanjiva Reddy
11		Bhagwat Dayal Sharma (1918–1993)	Haryana	10 July 1981	20 September 1983	2 years, 72 days	Neelam Sanjiva Reddy
12		Justice; Guru Prasanna Singh (1922–2013) (Acting)	Madhya Pradesh	21 September 1983	7 October 1983	16 days	Zail Singh
13		Bhagwat Dayal Sharma (1918–1993)	Haryana	8 October 1983	14 May 1984	219 days	Zail Singh
14		K. M. Chandy (1921–1998)	Kerala	15 May 1984	30 November 1987	3 years, 199 days	Zail Singh
15		Justice; Narayan Dutta Ojha (1926–2009) (Acting)	Madhya Pradesh	1 December 1987	29 December 1987	28 days	Ramaswamy Venkataraman
16		K. M. Chandy (1921–1998)	Kerala	30 December 1987	30 March 1989	1 year, 90 days	Ramaswamy Venkataraman
17		Sarla Grewal; IAS (Retd) (1927–2002)	Punjab	31 March 1989	5 February 1990^{[‡]}	311 days	Ramaswamy Venkataraman
18		Kunwar Mahmud Ali Khan (1920–2001)	Uttar Pradesh	6 February 1990	23 June 1993^{[‡]}	3 years, 137 days	Ramaswamy Venkataraman
19		Mohammad Shafi Qureshi (1928–2016)	Jammu and Kashmir	24 June 1993	21 April 1998	4 years, 301 days	Shankar Dayal Sharma
20		Bhai Mahavir (1922–2016)	Punjab	22 April 1998	7 May 2003	5 years, 15 days	K. R. Narayanan
21		Ram Prakash Gupta (1923–2004)	Uttar Pradesh	7 May 2003	1 May 2004^{[†]}	360 days	A. P. J. Abdul Kalam
22		Lieutenant General; Krishna Mohan Seth (Retd); PVSM AVSM (born 1939) (Additional Charge)	Uttar Pradesh	2 May 2004	29 June 2004	58 days	A. P. J. Abdul Kalam
23		Balram Jakhar (1923–2016)	Punjab	30 June 2004	30 June 2009	5 years, 0 days	A. P. J. Abdul Kalam
24		Rameshwar Thakur (1925–2015)	Jharkhand	30 June 2009	8 September 2011	2 years, 70 days	Pratibha Patil
25		Ram Naresh Yadav (1928–2016)	Uttar Pradesh	8 September 2011	8 September 2016	5 years, 0 days	Pratibha Patil
26		Om Prakash Kohli (1935–2023) (Additional Charge)	Delhi	8 September 2016	23 January 2018	1 year, 137 days	Pranab Mukherjee
27		Anandiben M. Patel (born 1941)	Gujarat	23 January 2018	28 July 2019^{[§]} (Note: Transferred as the Governor of Uttar Pradesh)	1 year, 186 days	Ram Nath Kovind
28		Lalji Tandon (1935–2020)	Uttar Pradesh	29 July 2019	21 July 2020^{[†]}	358 days	Ram Nath Kovind
29		Anandiben M. Patel (born 1941) (Additional charge)	Gujarat	1 July 2020	8 July 2021	1 year, 7 days	Ram Nath Kovind
30		Mangubhai C. Patel (born 1944)	Gujarat	8 July 2021	Incumbent	5 years, 131 days	Ram Nath Kovind

== See also ==
- Madhya Pradesh
- Chief Minister of Madhya Pradesh
- Governors of India
- Vindhya Pradesh
