= Lok Bhavan, Madhya Pradesh =

Lok Bhavan, Madhya Pradesh may refer to:

- Lok Bhavan, Bhopal, official winter residence of the governor of Madhya Pradesh, located in Bhopal.
- Lok Bhavan, Pachmarhi, official summer residence of the governor of Madhya Pradesh, located in Pachmarhi.
