= Tank Bund Road =

Road in Secunderabad, India

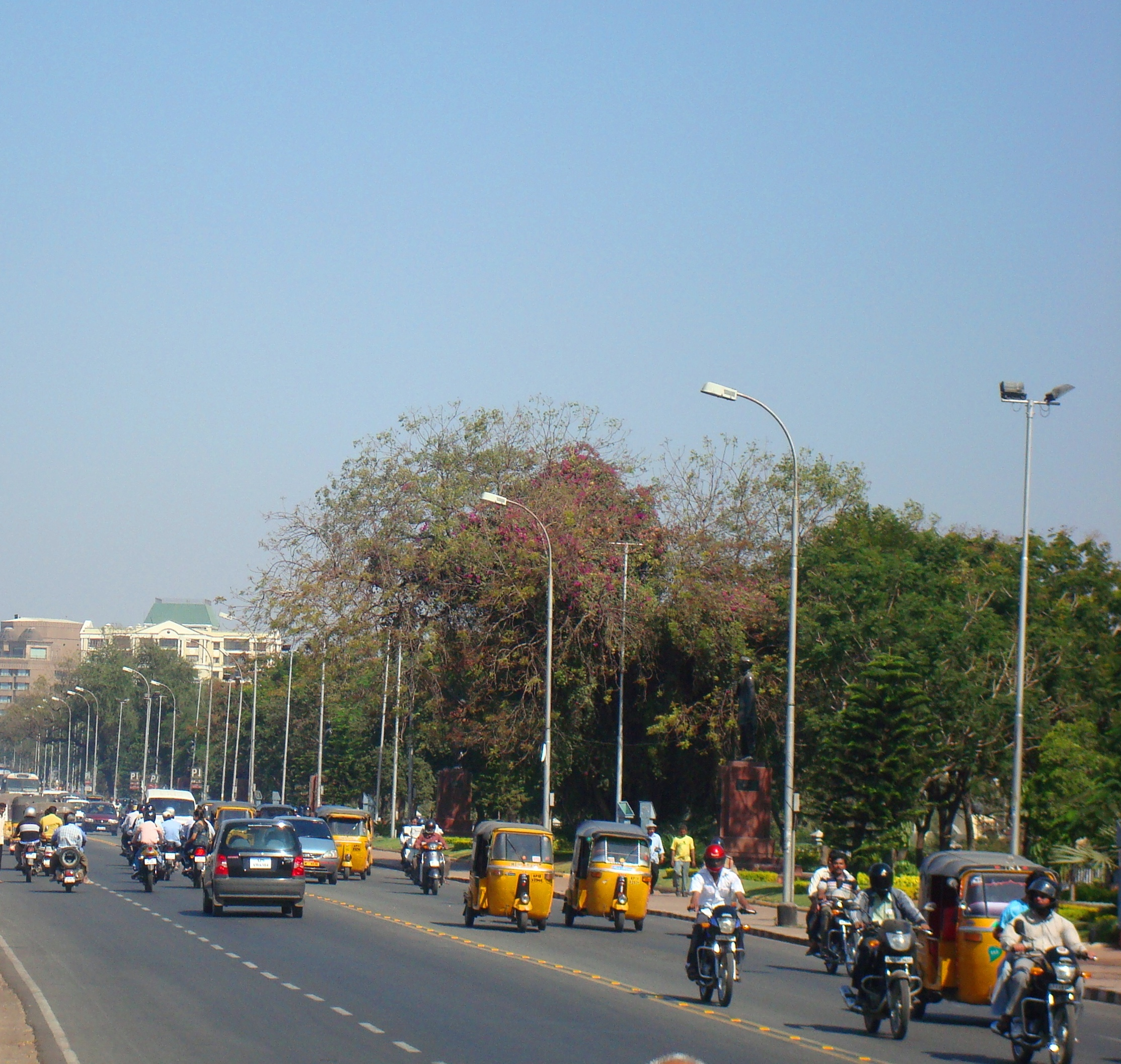
- Length: 3.2 km (2.0 mi)
- South end: Kavadiguda Road
- North end: Basheerbagh Road

The Tank Bund Road is a road in Secunderabad, Hyderabad, India. The Tank Bund dams Hussain Sagar lake on the eastern side and connects the twin cities of Hyderabad and Secunderabad. It has become an attraction with 33 statues of famous people from the region.

Origin (16th Century)

- The lake was built in 1562 during the rule of Ibrahim Quli Qutb Shah Wali of the Qutb Shahi dynasty.
- It was constructed to meet the water needs of the growing city.
- The engineer behind it was Hussain Shah Wali, after whom the lake is named.

The Pakistan Patton tank, now an attraction for visitors to the Tank Bund Road, is a war trophy given to the 54th Infantry Division, and is one that the Indian Army had disabled during the Battle of Basantar in Pakistan, between 15 and 17 December 1971.

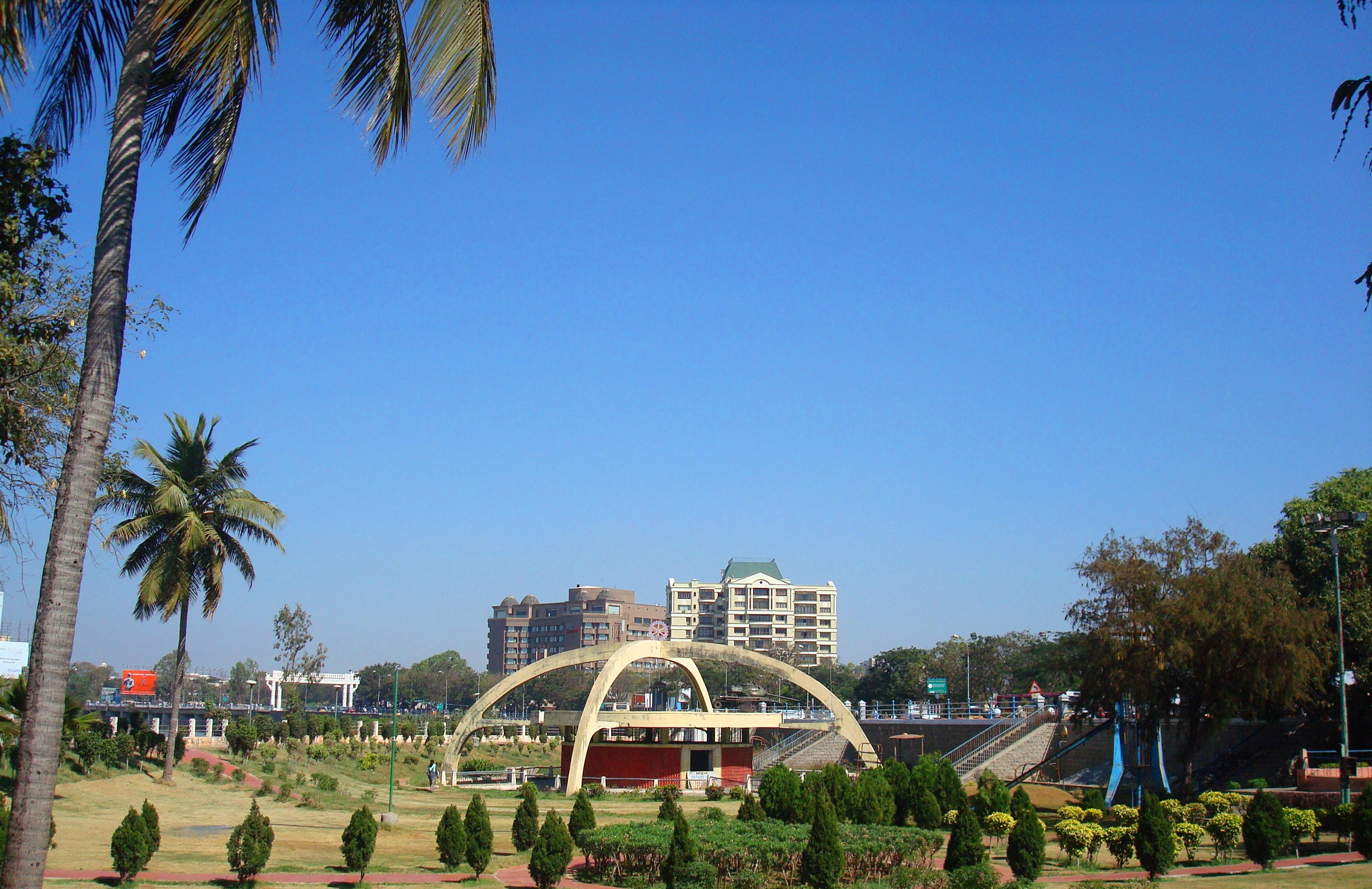
Gardens at Tank Bund

Parallel to the Tank Bund Road, the Lower Tank Bund road was intended to reduce traffic congestion. Lumbini Park is the nearest park to this road. The road is also a major point for street photography.

== Statues of Icons along Tank Bund Road ==
34 bronze statues, are installed on high platforms, of people who played iconic role in the development of Hyderabad and Telugu culture along the Tank Bund road. The statues were installed by the then Chief Minister of Andhra Pradesh, N. T. Rama Rao. A committee with members from various regions of then Undivided Andhra Pradesh shortlisted the personalities whose statues were to be installed.

The following 34 personalities are commemorated in the order of appearance from Secunderabad.

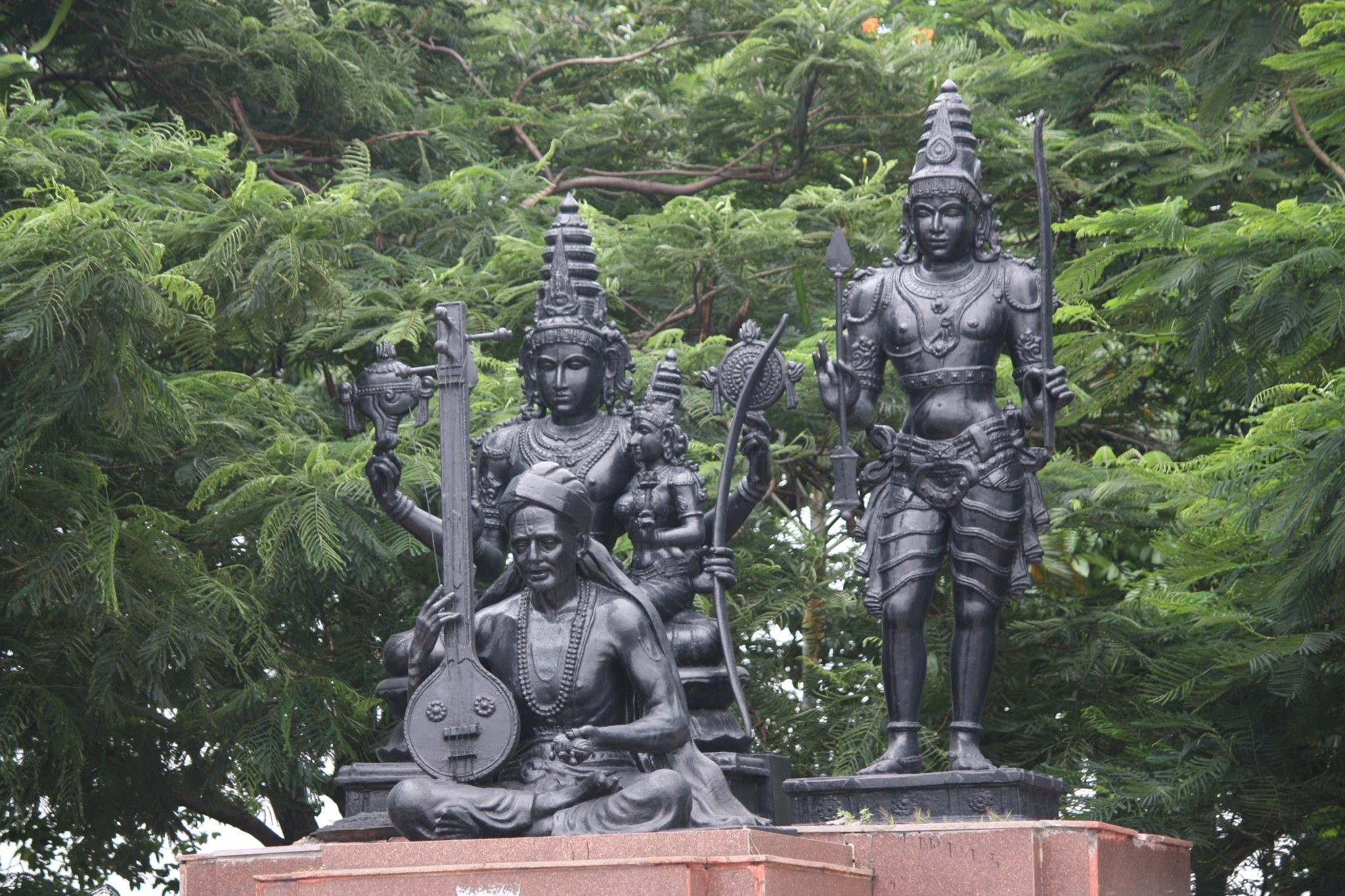
Monuments at Tank Bund Road

- Komaram Bheem
  Tribal leader from Telangana who openly fought against Nizam of Hyderabad with slogan Jal, jungal, zameen
- Rudrama Devi
  The 13th century Queen of the Kakatiya Dynasty which ruled over most parts of present-day Telangana and Andhra Pradesh
- Mahbub Ali Khan, Asaf Jah VI
  Sixth Nizam of Hyderabad
- Sarvepalli Radhakrishnan
  First Vice President of India and second President of India
- C. R. Reddy
  Educationist, political thinker, essayist, poet and literary critic
- Gurajada Apparao
  Telugu playwright, dramatist, poet, writer and humanist
- Ballari Raghava
  Telugu playwright, thespian and film actor
- Alluri Sita Rama Raju
  Indian Telugu revolutionary who fought against the British Raj
- Sir Arthur Cotton
  British irrigation engineer instrumental in building the Prakasam Barrage, the Dowleswaram Barrage and the Kurnool Cuddappah Canal (K. C. Canal)
- Tripuraneni Ramaswamy Chowdary
  Telugu lawyer, poet, playwright, reformer, rationalist and humanist
- Pingali Venkayya
  Indian freedom fighter and the designer of the flag on which the Indian national flag was based
- Kandukuri Veeresalingam
  Social reformer and Telugu writer
- Makhdoom Mohiuddin
  Urdu poet, Marxist political activist and a forerunner of Telangana Rebellion against the Nizam of Hyderabad
- Suravaram Pratapareddy
  Social historian from Telangana
- Gurram Jashuva
  Telugu poet and Dalit activist
- Mutnuri Krishna Rao
  Indian freedom fighter, editor, scholar and literary critic
- Sri Sri
  Telugu poet and lyricist
- Raghupathi Venkataratnam Naidu
  Indian social reformer
- Thyagaraja
  Renowned composer of Carnatic music
- Ramadasu
  17th-century Indian devotee of Lord Rama and a composer of Carnatic music
- Sri Krishnadevaraya
  The Emperor of the Vijayanagara Empire who reigned from 1509 to 1529
- Kshetrayya
  Telugu poet and composer of Carnatic music
- Potuluri Virabrahmendra Swami
  Hindu saint, who lived in Andhra Pradesh
- Bramha Naidu
  Minister in a Medieval Andhra kingdom of Palnadu
- Molla
  Telugu poet who authored the Telugu-language Ramayana
- Tana Shah
  Last ruler of the Qutb Shahi dynasty
- Siddhendra Yogi
  Inventor of Modern form of Classical dance Kuchipudi
- Yogi Vemana
  Telugu poet and philosopher
- Potana
  Telugu poet best known for his translation of the Bhagavata Purana from Sanskrit to Telugu
- Annamacharya
  15th-century Hindu saint and the earliest known Indian musician to compose songs called sankirtanas in praise of the Lord Venkateswara, a form of Vishnu
- Yerrapragada
  Medieval Telugu poet
- Tikkana
  Second poet of the "Trinity of Poets (Kavi Trayam)" that translated Mahabharata into Telugu
- Nannayya
  Telugu poet and the first in Trinity of poets (Kavitrayam), who authored Andhra mahabharatam, a Telugu retelling of the Mahabharata
- Gautamiputra Satakarni (Shalivahanudu)
  Ruler of the Satavahana Empire in present-day Deccan region of India
