= List of governors of the Central Provinces and Berar =

Below is a list of governors of the Central Provinces and Berar and the precursor offices associated with that title:

== Chief commissioners of Nagpur Province and Saugor Nerbudda territories ==
- 1861–1862: Edward King Elliot

== Chief commissioners of the Central Provinces ==
- 1862–1864: Edward King Elliot
- 1864–1867: Sir Richard Temple, Bt.
- 1867–1883: Sir John Henry Morris
- 1883–1884: William Brittain Jones
- 1884–1885: Sir Charles Haukes Todd
- 1885–1887: Dennis Fitzpatrick
- 1887–1889: Alexander Mackenzie
- 1889–1893: Sir Antony Patrick Macdonnell
- 1893–1895: Sir John Woodburn
- 1895–1898: Sir Charles James Lyall
- 1898–1899: Sir Denzil Charles Jelf Ibbetson
- 1899–1902: Sir Andrew Henderson Leith Fraser
- 1902–1904: John Prescott Hewett
- 1904–1905: Frederic Styles Philpin Lely
- 1905–1906: John Ontario Miller
- 1907–1912: Reginald Henry Craddock
- 1912–1920: Sir Benjamin Robertson
- 1920: Sir Frank George Sly

== Governors of the Central Provinces ==
- 1920–1925: Sir Frank George Sly
- 1925–1932: Sir Montagu Sherard Dawes Butler
- 1932–1936: Sir Hyde Clarendon Gowan

== Governors of the Central Provinces and Berar ==
- 1936–1938: Sir Hyde Clarendon Gowan (Edpuganti Raghavendra Rao from 15.05.1936 to 11.09.1936 Acting governor in place of Gowan)
- 11.09.1936–03.03.1938: Sir Hyde Clarendon Gowan
- 03.03.1938–27.05.1938: Sir Hugh Bomford (acting)
- 01.06.1938–01.07.1940: Sir Francis Verner Wylie
- 17.09.1940–16.09.1946: Sir Henry Joseph Twynam
- 16.09.1946–15.08.1947: Sir Frederick Chalmers Bourne
