= Arthur Cotton =

British general and irrigation engineer (1803–1899)

General Sir Arthur Cotton KCSI
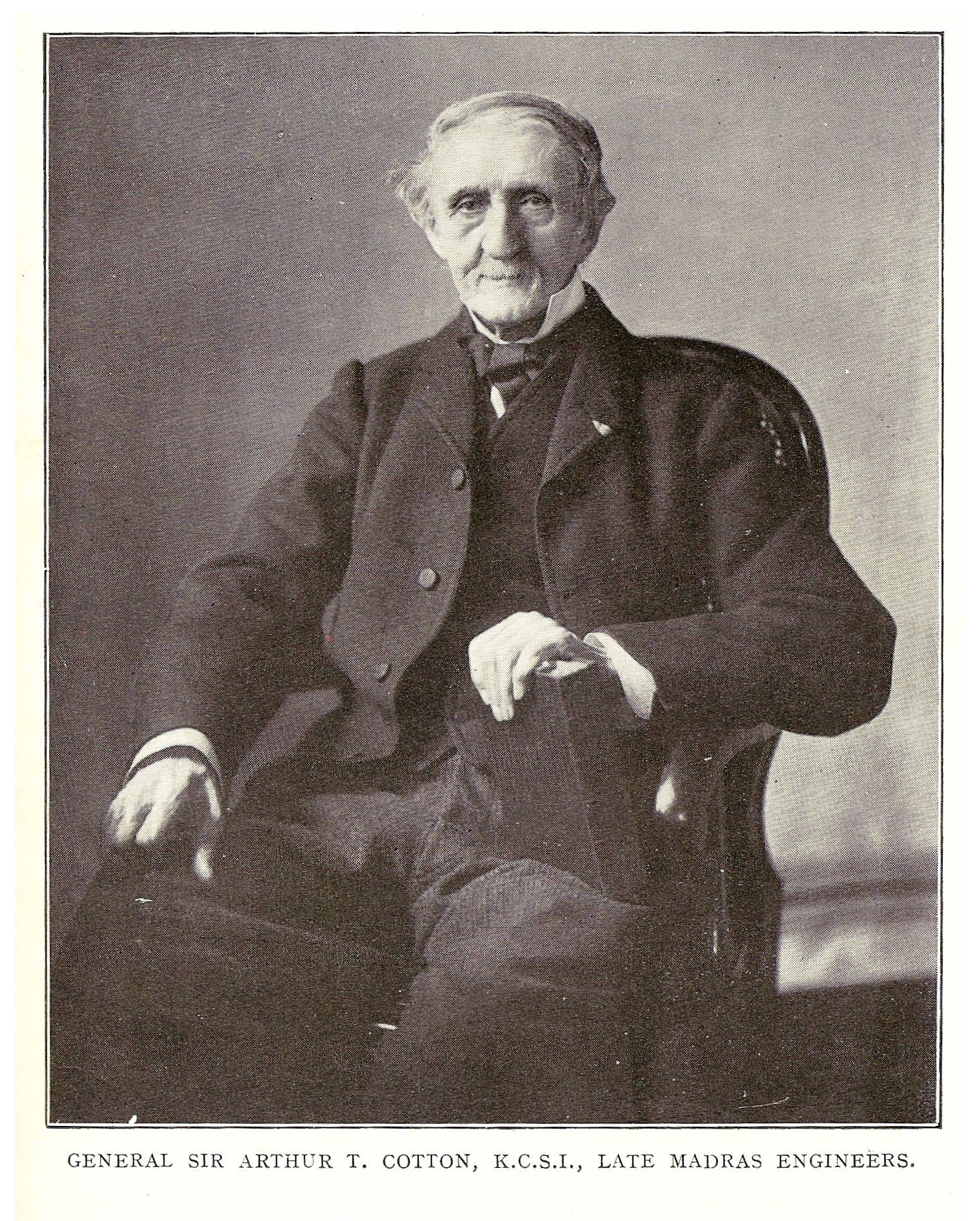
- Born: 15 May 1803; Combermere, Cheshire, England
- Died: 24 July 1899 (aged 96); Dorking, Surrey, England
- Military career
- Allegiance: United Kingdom
- Branch: Madras Army; British Army
- Service years: till 1877
- Rank: General
- Conflicts: First Anglo-Burmese War

General Sir Arthur Thomas Cotton KCSI (15 May 1803 – 24 July 1899) was a British army officer and irrigation engineer who worked in the Madras Presidency.

Cotton devoted his life to the construction of irrigation and navigation canals throughout British India. He helped many people by building the Dowleswaram Barrage (Rajahmundry), the Prakasam Barrage, and the Kurnool Cuddappah Canal (K. C. Canal). His dream was only partially realised, but he is still honoured in Andhra Pradesh and parts of Tamil Nadu for his efforts. The Sir Arthur Cotton Museum has been built in his honour in Rajamahendravaram, Andhra Pradesh. The museum holds approximately one hundred images and 15 machine tools that Cotton used when constructing the barrage in Andhra Pradesh from 1847 to 1852.

He was the father of the evangelist Elizabeth Hope.

== Biography ==
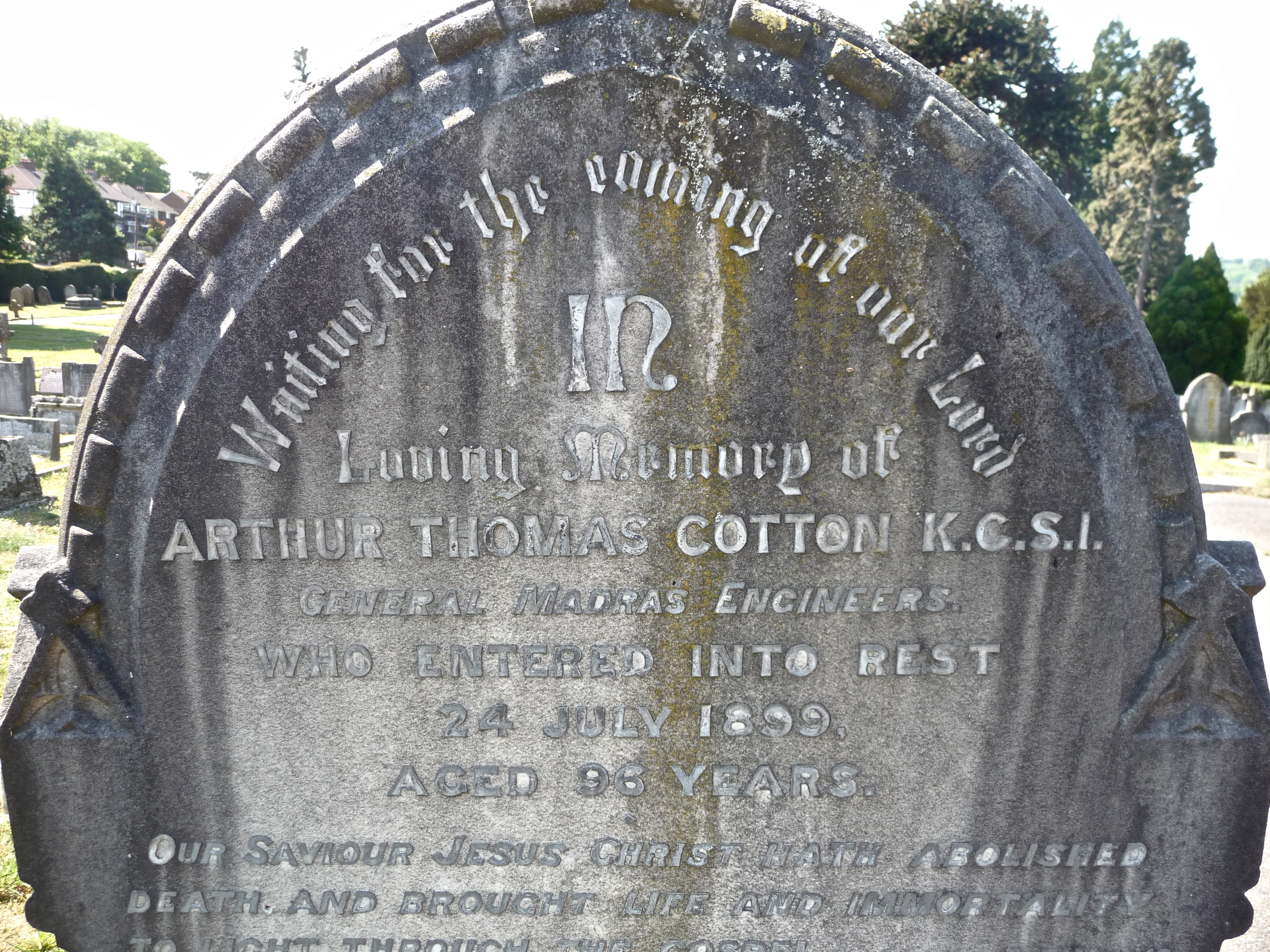
Tombstone of Sir Arthur Cotton

Arthur Cotton was born on 15 May 1803 at Combermere, the tenth son of Henry Calvely Cotton, uncle of the noted Field Marshal Lord Combermere, and one of eleven brothers. In 1818, aged 15, he became a cadet at the East India Company's military seminary at Addiscombe, Surrey. He passed out in December 1819 and was commissioned Second Lieutenant in the Madras Engineer Group. He entered the Madras Engineers in 1819 and fought in the First Burmese War.

He started his career with the Ordnance Survey at Bangor, North Wales, in January 1820, where he was praised for his reports. In 1821 he was appointed for service in India, where he was initially attached to the chief engineer to Madras. He was later appointed as an assistant engineer to superintending engineer of the Tank Department.

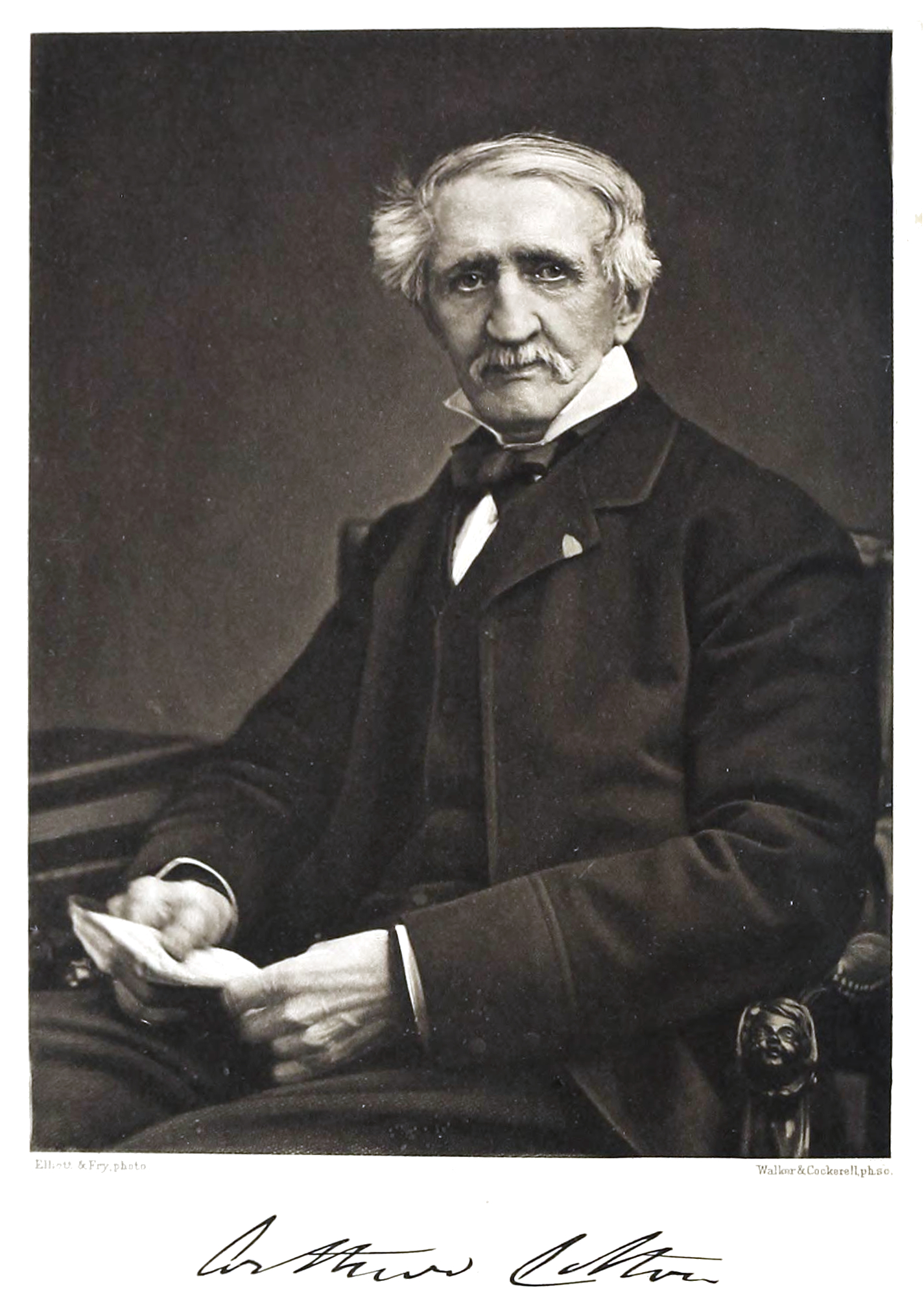

Cotton conducted a marine survey of the Pamban passage between India and Ceylon. He was promoted to the rank of captain in 1828, and was put in charge of investigation for the Cauveri Scheme. He started working to remove the soil settling in Kallanai Dam and with the model of the dam he built the Upper Dam in Kaveri in Mukkombu, near Tiruchirapalli. He constructed the Lower Anaicut Dam in Anaikarai. The success of these projects paved the way for further important projects on the Godavari and Krishna Rivers.

Cotton recalled how, from analysing the Kallanai Dam and its foundations, his group learned how to construct foundations in a sandbed. In 1844, Cotton recommended the construction of an "anicut" (a dam made in a stream for maintaining and regulating irrigation) and prepared plans for Visakhapatnam port. In 1847, the work on the Godavari anicut was started.

In 1848 he proceeded to Australia due to ill health and handed over the charge to Captain Orr. In 1850 he returned to India and was promoted to the rank of colonel. He succeeded in completing the magnificent project on the Godavari river at Rajahmundry in 1852. After completing the Godavari anicut Cotton shifted his attention to the construction of the aqueduct on Krishna River. The project was sanctioned in 1851 and completed by 1855. After completing the Krishna and Godavari anicuts, Cotton envisaged the storage of the Krishna and Godavari river waters.

In 1858, Cotton came up with even more ambitious proposals such as connecting all major rivers of India, and interlinking of canals and rivers. He suggested drought-relief measures for Odisha. Arthur Cotton retired from service in 1877 and left India. He was knighted in 1861. He visited India in 1862 and 1863 and offered advice on some river valley projects.

He was promoted to the rank of General in 1876.

His work in India was much appreciated and he was honoured with KCSI (Knight Commander of the Order of the Star of India) in 1866. He became a much-revered figure in the state of Andhra Pradesh for his contribution in irrigating the area of land also known as Konaseema.

Cotton died on 24 July 1899.

== Assessment ==
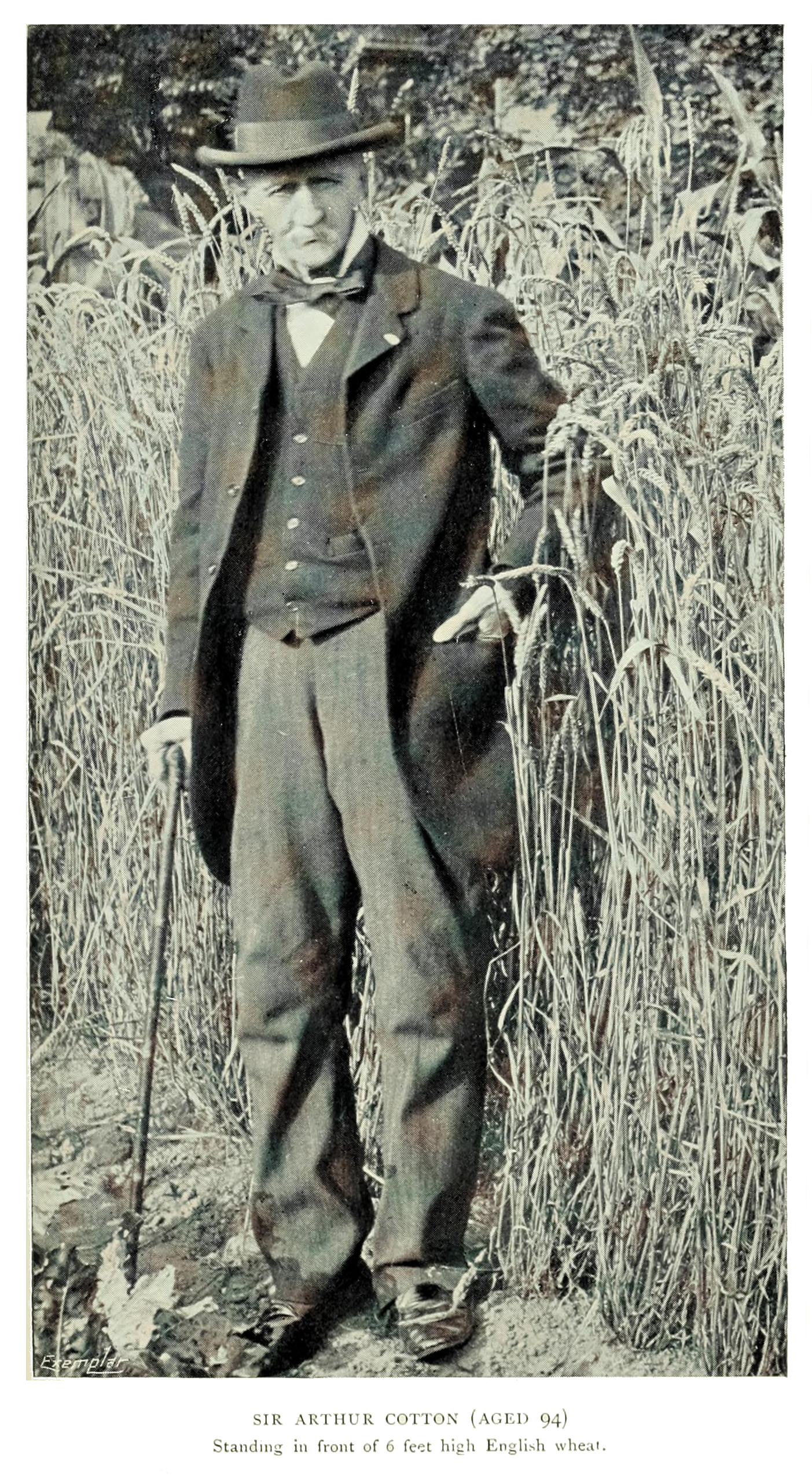
Aged 94

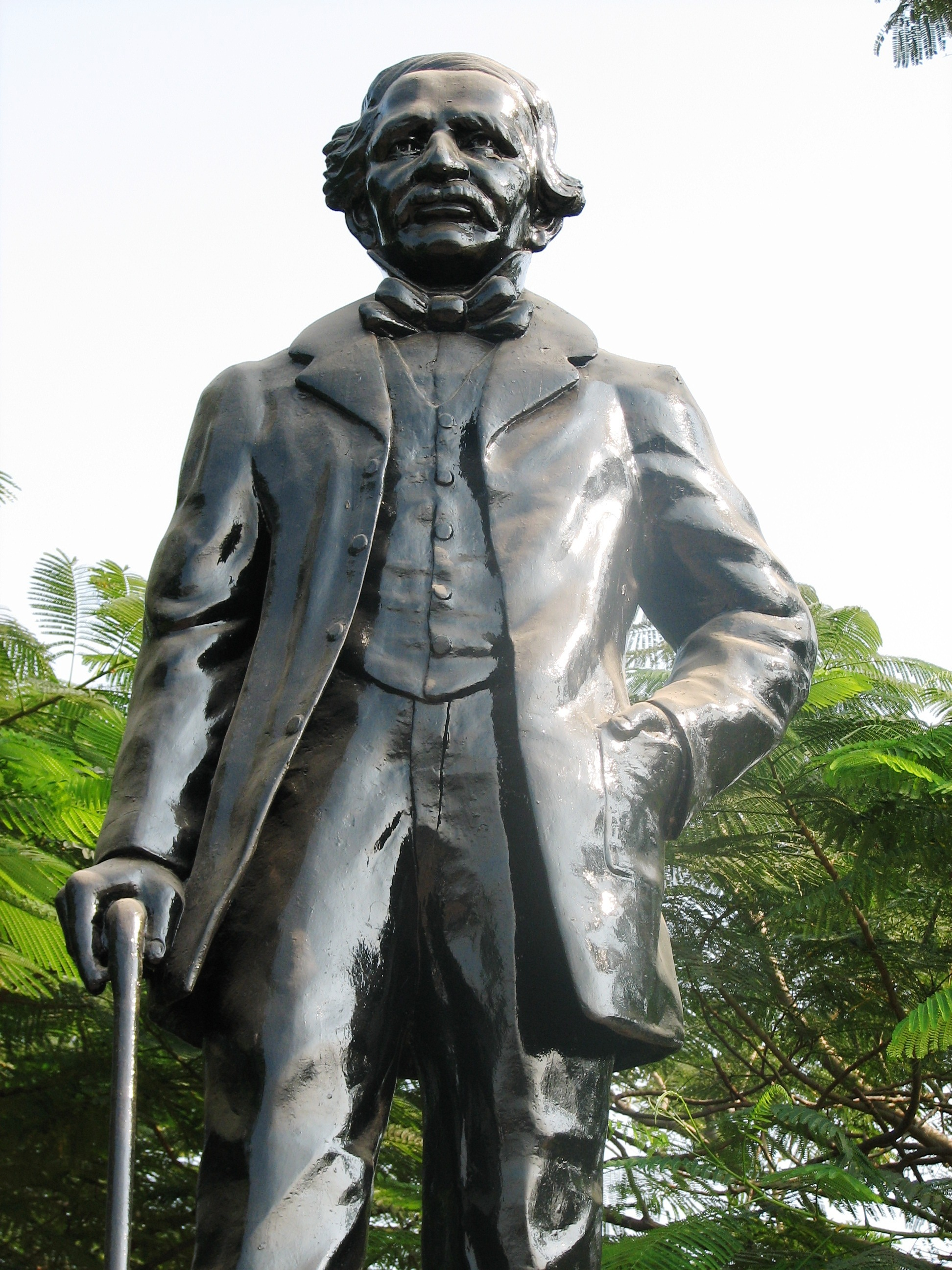
Statue of Cotton at Hyderabad

Cotton was hated by his administrative superiors—thanks to his empathy for the people of India. At one point, impeachment proceedings were initiated by his superiors for his dismissal.

Going through the famine and cyclone-ravaged districts of Godavari, Cotton was distressed by the sight of famished people of the Godavari districts. It was then that he put in process his ambitious plans to harness the waters of the Godavari river for the betterment of the community.

John Henry Morris in Godavari writes about the work of Cotton:

The Godavari anicut is, perhaps, the noblest feat of engineering skill which has yet been accomplished in British India. It is a gigantic barrier thrown across the river from island to island, in order to arrest the unprofitable progress of its waters to the sea, and to spread them over the surface of the country on either side, thus irrigating copiously land which has hitherto been dependent on tanks or on the fitful supply of water from the river. Large tracts of land, which had hitherto been left arid and desolate and waste, were thus reached and fertilised by innumerable streams and channels.

In 1878, Cotton had to appear before a House of Commons Committee to justify his proposal to build an anicut across the Godavari. A further hearing in the House of Commons followed by his letter to the then Secretary of State for India reveals his ambition to build the anicut across the Godavari. His letter concluded: "My Lord, one day's flow in the Godavari river during high floods is equal to one whole year's flow in the Thames of London". Cotton almost despaired at the British Government's procrastination in taking along this project.

According to Gautam Pingle, an Indian policymaker, the idea of interlinking of rivers in India to form a national water grid, an idea which had gained much attention from the Indian government and policy-makers at the turn of the 21st century, was in fact an idea that is more than 120 years old as it was first envisioned by Arthur Cotton.

=== Legacy in India ===
In recognition of Cotton's contributions, a new barrage constructed across the Godavari river, upstream of the anicut, was named after him, and dedicated to the nation by the Prime Minister of India, Indira Gandhi in 1982. He is revered in the Godavari District for making it the "rice bowl" of Andhra Pradesh. He is known as the "Delta Architect" of the Godavari District because of his pioneering work in irrigation engineering.

During the Godavari Maha Pushkaram festival of 2015, homages were paid to Arthur Cotton, with Nimmala Rama Naidu, the MLA of Pallakollu, offering pinda as per Hindu ancestral rites.

A statue of Arthur Cotton has been installed on Tank Bund Road in Hyderabad, along with statues of other heroes of the united Andhra state.

The Institution of Engineers (India) instituted a prize in his honour for the best paper published in the Civil Engineering Division's journal. This is awarded annually.

== Major works as an engineer ==
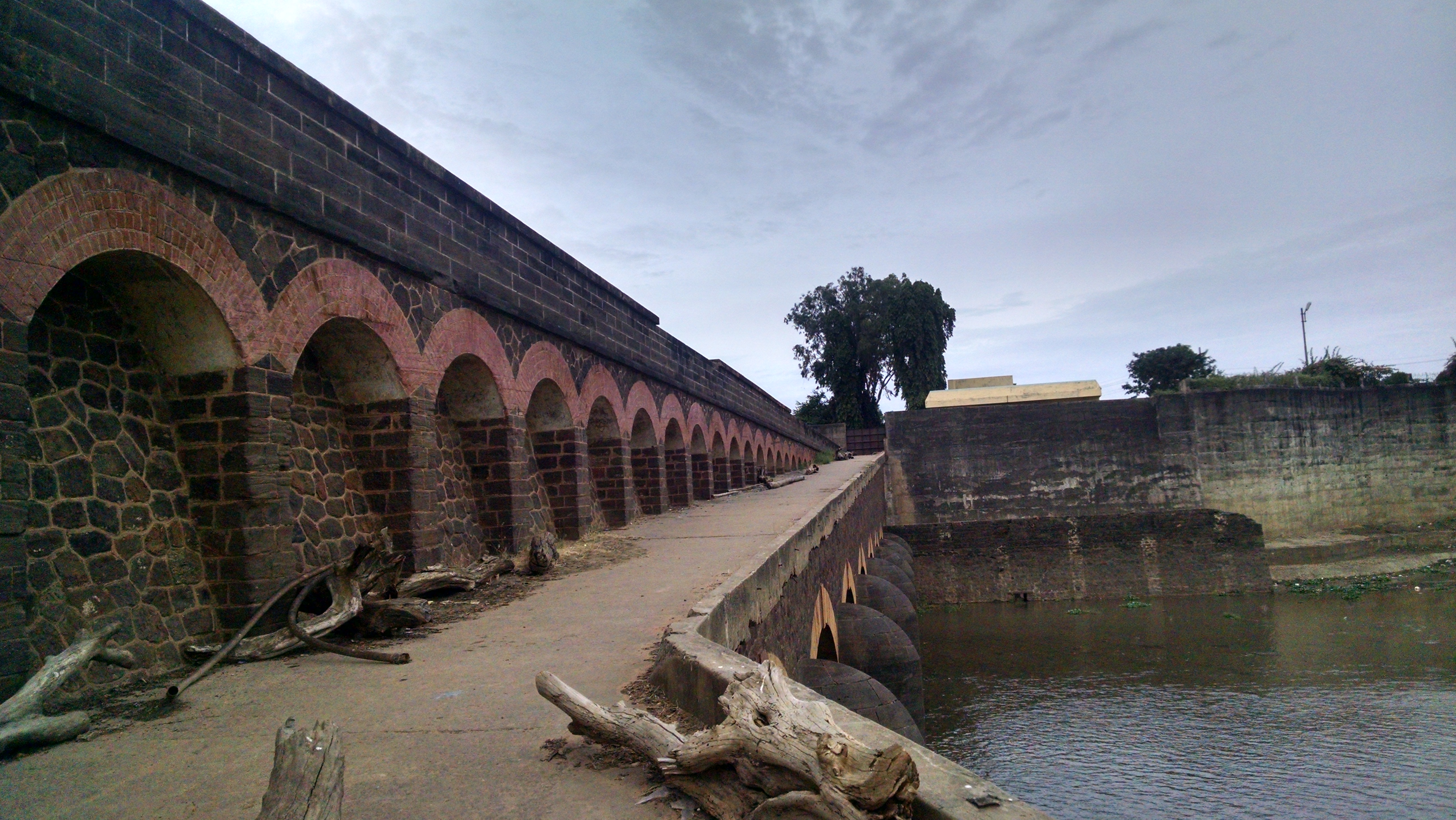
Oldest Cotton Dam constructed by Sir Arthur Cotton on Godavari river to control floods.

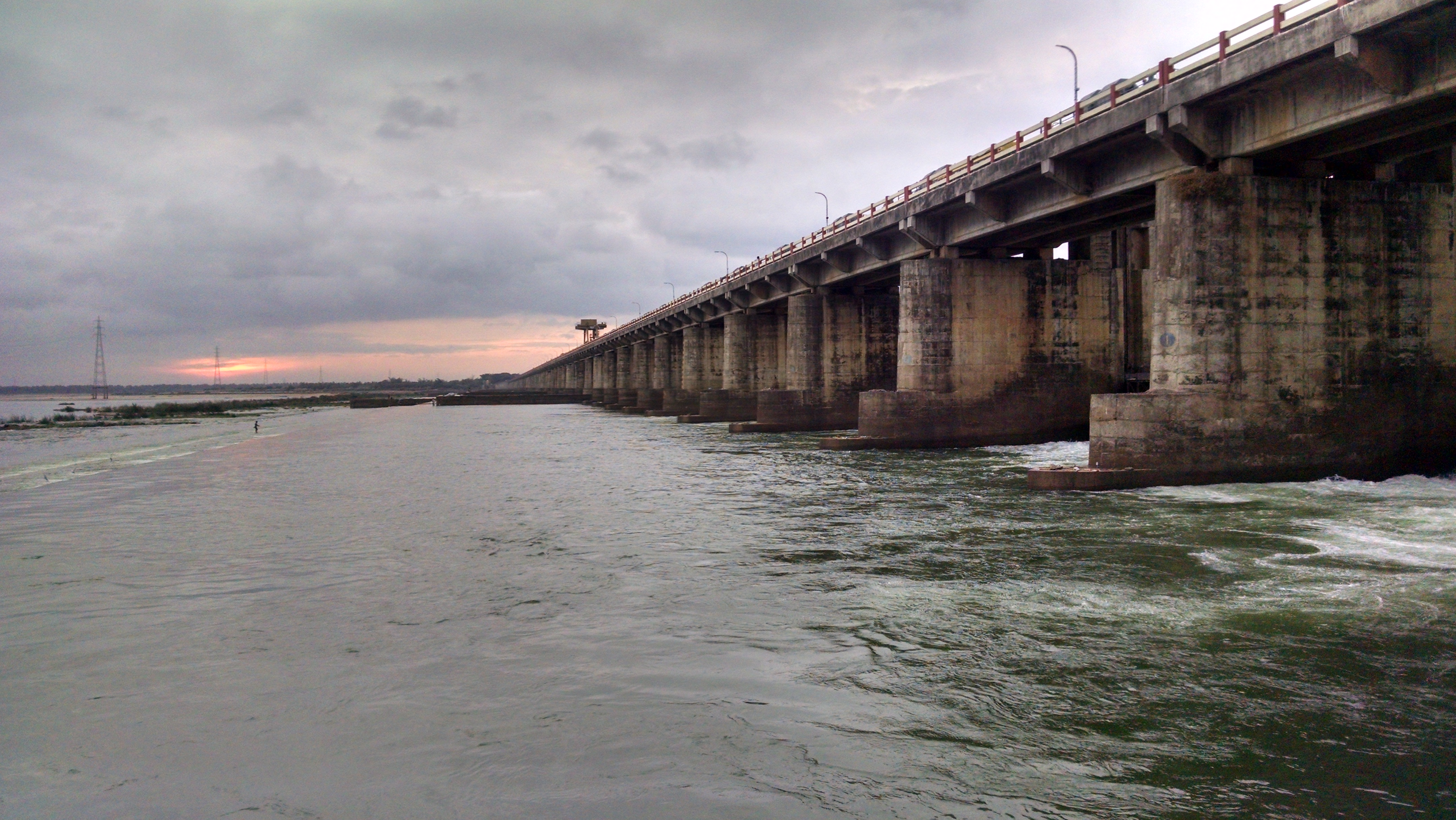
Sir Arthur Cotton Barrage in Rajamahendravaram on River Godavari

- The Godavari Canal System
- The Ganges Canal
- Sir Arthur Cotton Barrage

== See also ==
- List of dams and reservoirs in India
- Colonel John Pennycuick, another westerner who is respected by Tamil people, an engineer
- Charles Phillip Brown, another westerner who is respected by Telugu people, an administrator and patron of Telugu
- Sir Sydney John Cotton (1792–1874), elder brother
- Rev. Richard Lynch Cotton (1794–1880), elder brother
- Dr. K. L. Rao
- Dr. K. Sriramakrishnaiah
