= NW4 =

NW4 can refer to:

- NW postcode area
- National Waterway 4 (India)
