= National Waterway 4 =

Long waterway in India

National Waterway 4 (NW-4)
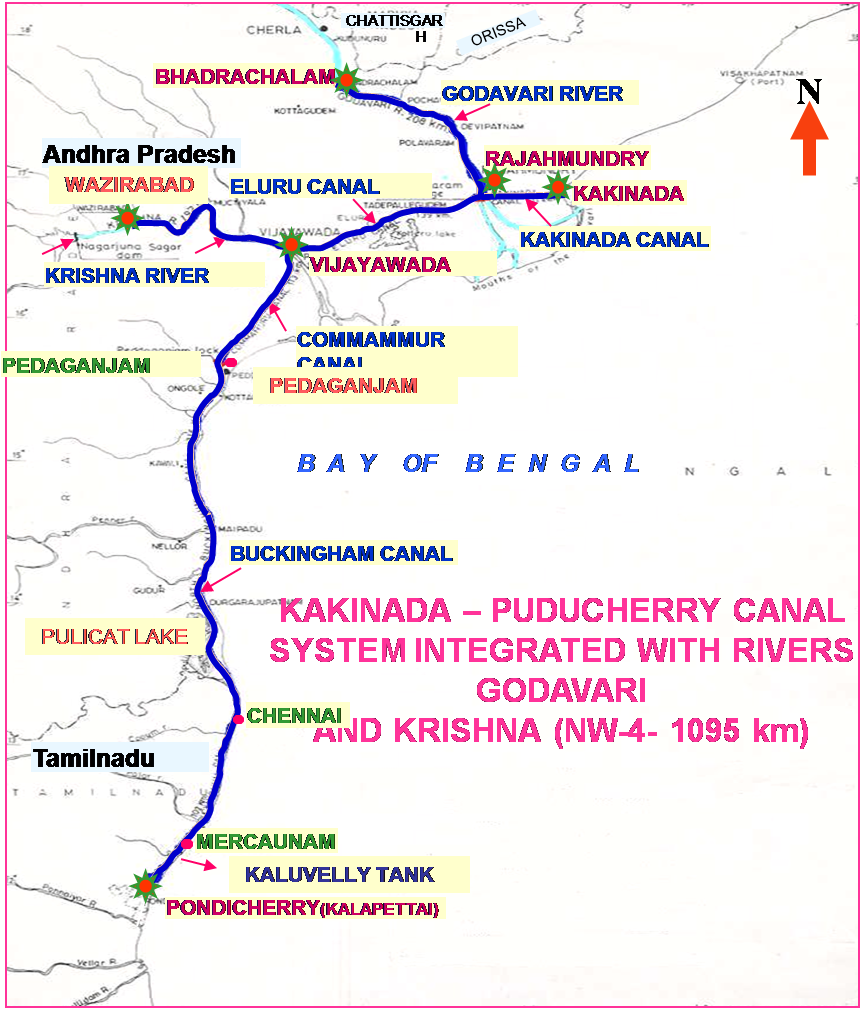

Details
- Location: Kakinada, Chennai, Puducherry
- Length: 1095 km
- No. of terminals: 15
- Owner: Inland Waterways Authority of India (IWAI)
- Operator: Central Inland Water Transport Corporation (CIWTC)

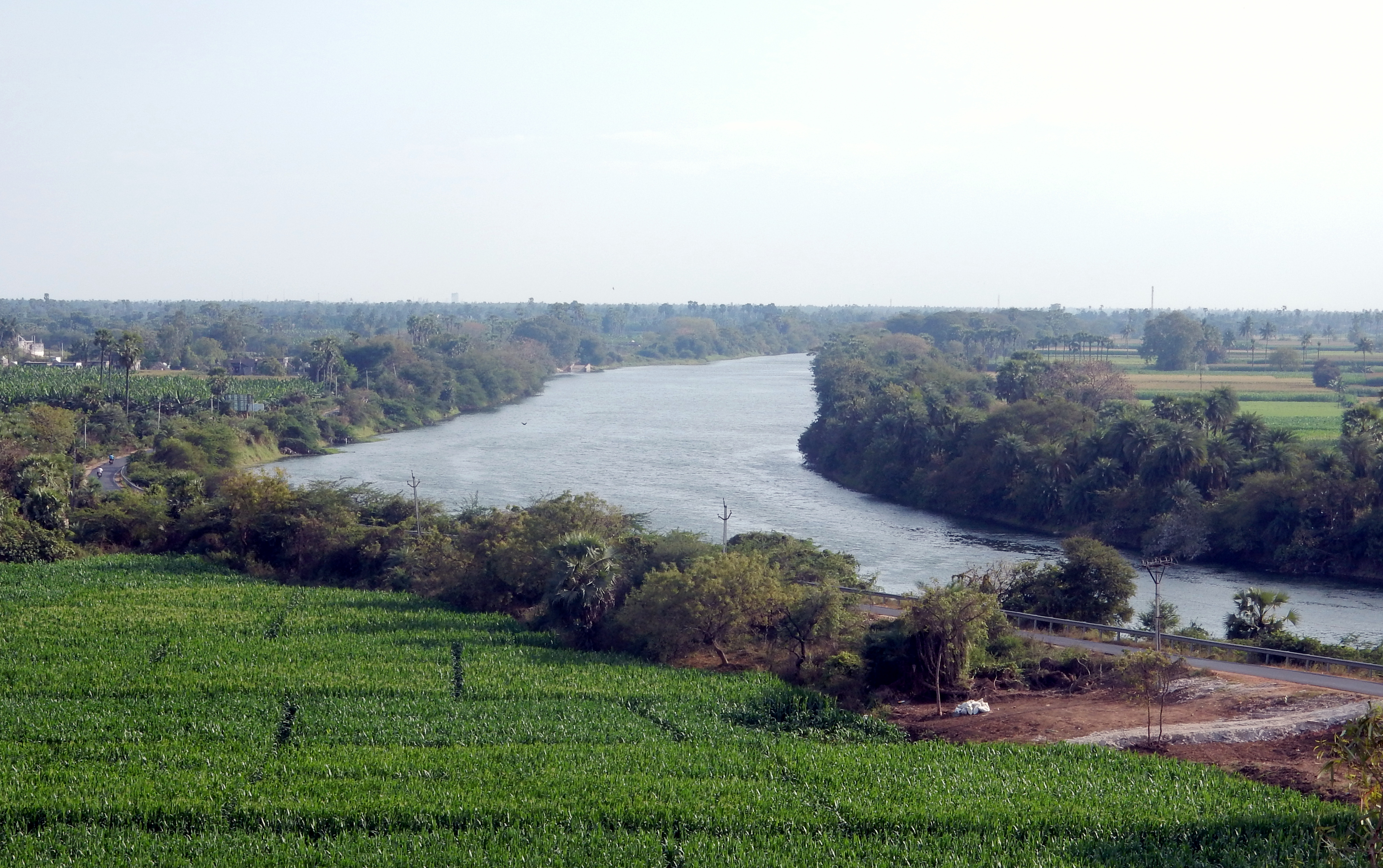
Buckingham Canal in Andhra Pradesh.

National Waterway 4 (NW-4) is a 1,095 kilometres (680 mi) long waterway in India. It has been declared as an Indian National Waterway and is currently under development. It connects the Indian states of Telangana, Andhra Pradesh, Tamil Nadu, and the union territory of Puducherry. The NW-4 runs along the Coromandal Coast through Kakinada, Eluru, Commanur, Buckingham Canals and also through part of Krishna and Godavari rivers in South India. It was declared a National Waterway on 24 November 2008 under the Provisions of National Waterways Bill, 2006. It is being developed by the Inland Waterways Authority of India (IWAI), and was scheduled for completion by 2013. The National Waterways Act, 2016 has extended the length of NW-4 from 1,095 km (680 mi) to 2,890 km (1,800 mi) by connecting the Krishna and Godavari Rivers. The Project would be undertaken in 3 phases with first phase beginning in October, 2017 and to be completed by June, 2019

== History ==
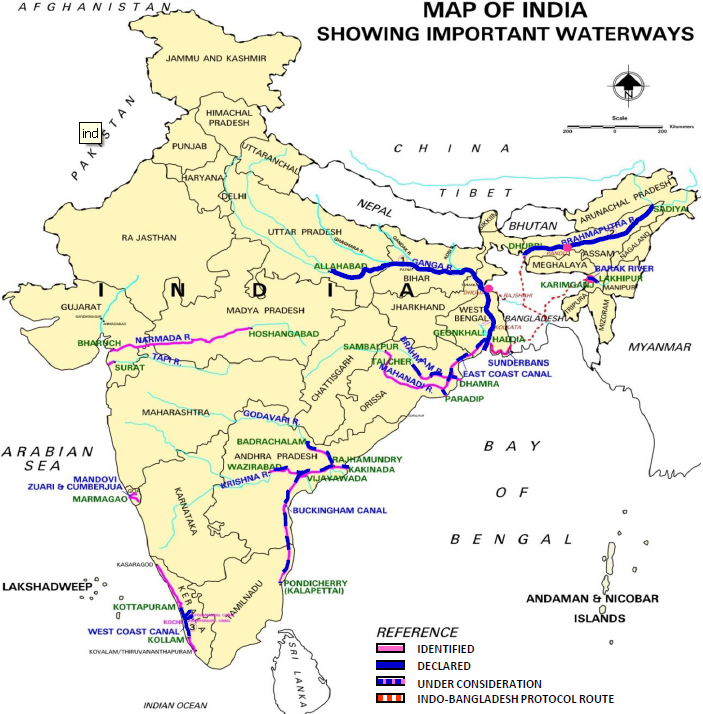
Map showing all the National Waterways in India

=== National waterways in India ===
In India, the national waterways are developed by the central government through the Inland Waterways Authority of India (IWAI) – the regulatory body for the Inland Waterways Transport (IWT) sector. IWAI was set up by the Inland Waterways Authority of India Act in 1985 and given responsibility of development, maintenance, and regulation of national waterways in the country. It is a statutory autonomous body for regulating and developing navigation and shipping in the inland waterways. Along with IWAI, Central Inland Water Transport Corporation (CIWTC) also supports the IWT sector through transportation of cargo via inland waterways and the operation and maintenance of the vessels and waterway terminals. The first national waterways established in India were the NW-1,2 & 3 (est. in mid 1980s & 1993). They have a combined length of 2,716 km (1,688 mi).

=== Development of NW-4, 5, and 6 ===
As early as 1993–95, IWAI commenced studies for developing an integrated canal linking Kakinada and Chennai. The Indian government initiated the process for developing three more national waterways in 2005. In July 2006, T. R. Baalu, the Minister of Shipping, Road Transport and Highways announced the proposal for development of NW-4 in the Lok Sabha. In addition to the three existing national waterways, the government also declared the following inland waterways as national waterways:

Lengths of Individual Stretches (NW-4)

Stretch	Length (in km)
Kakinada canal	50
Eluru canal	139
Krishna River section	157
Godavari River section	171
Commamur canal	113
North Buckingham canal	316
South Buckingham canal	110
Marakkanam-Pondicherry section	22
Total	1,095

- NW-4: Kakinada-Pondicherry canals along with Godavari and Krishna rivers (1,095 km (680 mi))
- NW-5: East Coast Canal along with Brahmani river and Mahanadi delta (623 km (387 mi))
- NW-6: River Barak (152 km (94 mi))

The proposals were made into law with the passage of The Inland Vessels (Amendment) Bill, 2005 in 2007. In October 2008, another bill – the National waterways Bill, 2006 – was passed in Parliament. It declared the Kakinada-Pondicherry stretch of canals comprising the Kakinada canal, Eluru canal, Commamur canal, Buckingham canal, the Kaluvelly tank, Bhadrachalam- Rajahmundry stretch of rivers Godavari, Wazirabad-Vijayawada stretch of river Krishna in Telangana, Andhra Pradesh, Tamil Nadu, and Puducherry as national waterways. It will take seven years and ₹1,515 crore (equivalent to ₹38 billion or US$450 million in 2023) for the completion of the proposed new national waterways. The national waterway will be owned by Inland Waterways Authority of India (IWAI) and will be operated by Central Inland Water Transport Corporation (CIWTC)

== Course ==
The National Waterway NW-4 comprises nearly 690 km (430 mi) of canal and 328 km (204 mi) of river sections. In turn, the river section of the NW-4 comprises two major sections:

- Godavari River section
- Krishna River section.

The Godavari River section stretches from Bhadrachalam, Telangana to Dowleiswaram, Rajahmundry, Andhra Pradesh. The Krishna River section stretches from Wazirabad Nalgonda district, Telangana to Prakasam Barrage, Vijayawada, Andhra Pradesh.

The canal section of NW-4 is formed by a combination of the Kakinada canal, the Eluru canal, Commamur canal, and the Buckingham canal. The Kakinada canal runs between Kakinada and Rajahmundry for a length of 50 km (31 mi). Starting from Dowleiswaram on the left bank of the river Godavari through a head sluice and lock to Kakinada (approx. 5 km (3.1 mi) downstream from Kakinada Port). The canal gets its water from the Godavari river through the Dowleiswaram barrage and thereafter connects Kakinada anchorage port. It connects the Godavari river section from Bhadrachalam to Rajahmundry. The Eluru canal comprises two distinct irrigation-cum – navigation canals, namely the Krishna Eluru canal of the eastern Krishna delta and the Godavari Eluru canal of western Godavari delta. It runs between Vijayawada to Vijjeswaram lock at Sir Arthur Thomas Cotton Barrage for a total distance of 139 km (86 mi). The Krishna Eluru canal takes off from the river section on the left bank of Krishna river on the upstream of Prakasam barrage through a head sluice at Vijayawada and meets Godavari Eluru canal at east Tammileru lock at Eluru. The Godavari Eluru canal takes off from the River section of river Godavari at Vijjeswaram (16°56′2″N 81°43′27″E) in Rajahmundry on the upstream of Dowleiswaram anicut through a head sluice and joins Krishna Eluru canal at East Tammileru lock. The Commamur canal runs between Vijayawada Seethanagaram lock and Peddaganjam lock for a total length of 113 km (70 mi) It takes off from the Krishna River section in river Krishna in Vijayawada on the right side upstream off Prakasam barrage through a head sluice at Seethanagaram and joins the Buckingham canal at Peddaganjam Lock near Ongole. The Buckingham canal is a tidal canal stretching from Peddaganjam lock to Chennai and further down south up to Marakkanam. The stretch of the canal from Peddaganjam lock to Chennai for a length of 316 km (196 mi) is called "North Buckingham canal" and the canal path from Chennai to Marakkanam for a total length of 110 kilometres (68 mi) is called "South Buckingham canal". It was constructed during the 19th century along the Coromandal Coast. Marakkanam is connected to the Sea (Bay of Bengal) at Pondicherry by the Kalluvelly tank.

The lengths of the NW-4 in Andhra Pradesh, Tamil Nadu, and Puducherry are as follows:

State	Name of Canals and rivers	Stretch	Total Length
Andhra Pradesh	Kakinada Canal, Eluru Canal, Commamur Canal, Godavari River, Krishna River and North Buckingham Canal	(Peddaganjam (15.652681°N 80.238898°E) to Andhra Pradesh and Tamil Nadu border at Tada)	895 km (556 mi)
Tamil Nadu	North Buckingham Canal and South Buckingham Canal	(Andhra Pradesh and Tamil Nadu border at Tada to Kalluvelly tank	210 km (130 mi)
Puducherry		Southern portion of Kalluvelly tank to Pondicherry link	2 km (1.2 mi)

=== Geographical boundaries ===
Boundary	Description
Northern	A perpendicular line drawn across the Kakinada Canal to Jaganadhapuram road bridge located at Kakinada at a distance of 500 m (1,600 ft) downstream at 16.941098°N 82.242576°E.
Southern	Junction of East coast highway and Chinnakalwari-Kanagachettikulam road at Kanagachettikulam which is the end point of artificial canal link to Kaluvelly tank located at 12.080047°N 79.83696°E.
Western (River Godavari)	Road bridge at Bhadrachalam across Godavari River at 17.678354°N 80.880423°E.
Western (River Krishna)	Road bridge at Wazirabad across Krishna River at 16.682252°N 79.657309°E.
Eastern (River Godavari)	Dowleswaram Barrage (Sir Arthur Cotton barrage) across river Godavari at Dowleswaram, Rajahmundry at 16.936301°N 81.760383°E
Eastern (River Krishna)	Prakasam barrage across river Krishna at Vijayawada at 16.50665°N 80.605291°E

== Development ==
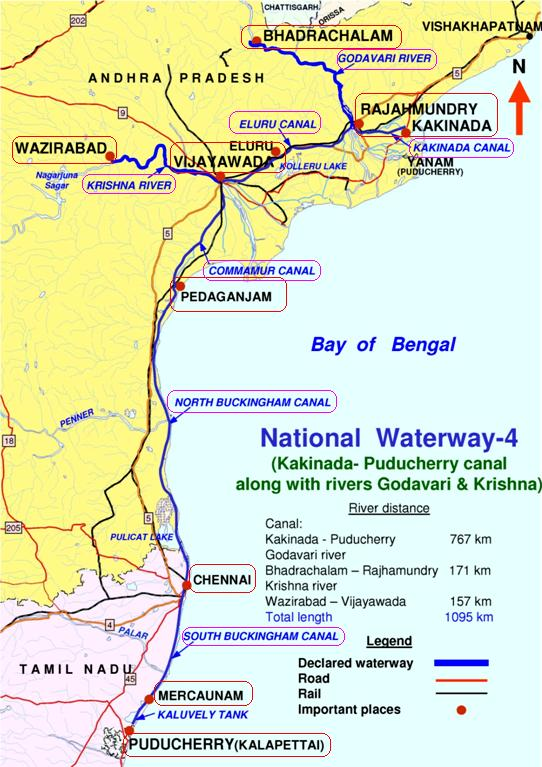
Map of NW-4

The concept of National Waterways was introduced in 1982 to promote the development of inland water transport in the country. At present, out of six declared National Waterways, developmental works are being carried out on NW-1, 2, and 3 only by Inland Waterways Authority of India (IWAI). The first three National Waterways (NW-1, 2 & 3) are being developed for shipping and navigation by providing basic inland transport infrastructural facilities, including navigational channel with required depth and width, aids for day and night navigation, and terminals at selected locations for berthing and loading/unloading of vessels.

In NW-1 & 2, IWAI undertakes river conservatory works to provide navigational channel of 3 m (9.8 ft), 2 m (6.6 ft), and 1.5 m (4.9 ft) depth in different stretches during the low water period. In NW–3, IWAI is carrying out dredging to provide a navigational depth and width of 2 m (6.6 ft) and 32 m (105 ft), respectively. Development works are being carried out with the objective of making all three National waterways fully operational with cargo and other inland vessels by March 2012.

For National Waterways 4 and 5, IWAI initiated the proposals for development in July 2010. Techno-economic studies for establishment of National Waterways NW-4 was done by Water And Power Consultancy Services (WAPCOS), a subsidiary of Ministry of Water Resources

The completion period for NW-4 was estimated at seven years by Detailed Project Report prepared by WAPCOS, which is contrary to that of 2002 estimates which indicated five years as completion period. 1,707-hectare (4,220-acre) of land are required for NW-4 construction; 300 ha (740 acres), 1,380 ha (3,400 acres), and 27 ha (67 acres) land has to be acquired in the states of Tamil Nadu, Andhra Pradesh, and Puducherry respectively.

== Traffic ==
A. F. Ferguson was appointed by WAPCOS for conducting traffic studies for proposed waterway in 2005–06.

=== Current traffic ===
There is no significant traffic in the waterway except for movement of country boats which carry local produce. The main reason for lack of IWT movement is the absence of other infrastructure facilities and coordinated effort for improvements.

=== Potential traffic ===
NW-4 has been divided into four major cargo belts, namely Kakinada belt, Krishna belt, South Andhra Pradesh belt, and Chennai belt. Based on the survey conducted by WAPCOS, the 11 million tonnes of cargo is expected to be transported through NW-4 every year. Types of cargo include coal, rice, foodgrains, cement, fertilisers, forest products, salt, and other bulk cargo. The Godavari River system flows through the Bhadrachalam forests and coal deposits. The Krishna River flows through limestone deposits and cement industries at Jaggayyapeta.

=== Krishna River (Wazirabad – Vijayawada) ===
Guntur has abundant resources of limestone which are of use in cement and steel industries. Main consumers of limestone are nearby situated cement and steel industries like ACC, Andhra Cement, Parthasarathy Cements & Industries Ltd and Gauthami Cements as well as Visakhapatnam Steel Plant.

=== Godavari River (Bhadrachalam – Rajahmundry) ===
The coal is a substantially available commodity in this stretch due to its nearness to Singareni Collieries (SCCL) mines. Coal fields are located in Kothagudem, Manuguru and Yellandu. Rice has a huge traffic potential in this downstream route up to Rajahmundry. In the upstream direction, traffic potential will be gained by transportation of forest products, wood pulp to Bhadrachalam where major paper mills like ITC Bhadrachalam and Andhra Pradesh paper mills (APPML) are located. Apart from this, many small paper mills are located in the East and West Godavari districts.

=== Kakinada Canal ===
Main cargo to be transported in downstream direction from kakinada to rajahmundry are coal, fertilizer, salt and rock Phosphate. In the upstream direction, rice bran extractions, cement clinker and fertilizers will be the main cargos for transportation.

=== Eluru Canal ===
Rice and other food grains, rice bran extractions, coal, fertilizer and other general cargo are the substantive commodities which can boost the IWT in this stretch.

=== Commanur Canal ===
The stretch from Vijayawada to Peddaganjam (Ongole) is a vital trade link connecting Kakinada belt with south A.P and Tamil Nadu. The major towns in the vicinity capable of promoting IWT are Vijayawada, Guntur Tenali and Ongole. Main traffic in the downward direction are rice and food grains. Forest products will form traffic in the upstream direction.

=== North Buckingham Canal ===
The canal can form significant traffic because of salt pans located all along the canal stretch. Rice, food grains, fertilizers, chili peppers, tobacco, fish, granite and vegetables in the downstream direction from Peddaganjam to Chennai. In the upstream direction from Chennai to Peddaganjam, the main traffic consists of fertilizers from Madras Fertilisers (MFL) plant located at Ennore and salt from Chennai.

=== South Buckingham Canal and Kaluvelly Tank ===
The canal stretch from Basin bridge up to Marakkanam can constitute significant traffic of salt and marine products because of salt pans and aquaculture shrimp farms all along the route. In the upstream direction from Pondicherry via Marakkanam to Chennai, the main traffic consists of salt, fertilizers and timber from Marakkanam, Thiruvallur, Kanchipuram, Villupuram and Pondicherry.

== NW-4 as Natural Barrier ==
The stretch of Buckingham Canal saved thousands of lives in the states of Andhra Pradesh and Tamil Nadu along the coromandal coast from tsunami waves, that occurred on 26 December 2004. Dr. B. Ramalingeswara Rao of National Geophysical Research Institute (NGRI), Hyderabad reports that the Buckingham Canal acted as a buffer zone and regulated the tsunami waves on the coastal region over 310 km (190 mi) from Pedda Ganjam to Chennai. The tsunami waves drifted away towards the existing low-lying creeks at several places.

The canal from Chennai (Marakkanam) to Durga Raya Patnam near Nellore and then to Pedda Ganjam, all along the east coast was filled with tsunami water, which overflowed at a few places and receded back to sea within 10–15 minutes. This saved the lives of several fishermen, especially in coastal Andhra Pradesh and parts of Chennai city.

== Cost ==
The cost for developing a waterway in India is approximately ₹0.5 crore (US$59,000) per km, whereas developing a railway or roadway costs around ₹4 crore (US$470,000) – ₹6 crore (US$710,000) per km. As per estimates drawn by consultants M/s RITES in 2002, the project will cost ₹542 crore (equivalent to ₹21 billion or US$240 million in 2023) and facilitate movement of 100 tonne vessels in the irrigation canal portion and 350 tonne in the rivers and Buckingham canal portion.

The cost was re-estimated by WAPCOS in 2009 to ₹1,515 crore (equivalent to ₹38 billion or US$450 million in 2023), which involves two phase development of the project. Phase one of the project envisages development of a stretch comprising Godavari and Krishna rivers, and Kakinada and Eluru canals, which has maximum cargo potential, at an estimated cost of ₹390 crore (equivalent to ₹981 crore or US$120 million in 2023) and land acquisition for remaining stretch at an estimated cost of ₹219 crore (equivalent to ₹551 crore or US$65 million in 2023). Phase two of the project involves development of North and South Buckingham Canal, Commamur canal, and Kaluvelly Tank at an estimated cost of ₹906 crore (equivalent to ₹23 billion or US$270 million in 2023).

In the Tenth Five-Year Plan, Planning Commission has increased the budgetary provision for the development of inland water transport infrastructure to ₹636.73 crore (US$75 million), against ₹150 crore (US$18 million) in the Ninth Five-Year Plan.

For the year 2009–2010, the government has released the following funds through Ministry of Shipping for development of IWT.

- ₹62.68 crore (US$7.4 million) as a grant to IWAI for development and maintenance of National Waterways (NW 1,2,3,4 & 5).And also for undertaking projects related to IWT promotion, training, IT activities etc.
- ₹1 crore (US$120,000) has been released for Technical Studies and R&D activities.
- ₹1 crore (US$120,000) has been released for Inland Vessel Building Subsidy Scheme.
- ₹1 crore (US$120,000) has been released for Central Sector Schemes for IWT Development in North Eastern Region.

== Delay in the project ==
Common factors attributable for delay in development of IWT are lack of infrastructure, absence of fixed scheduled services, poor navigational aids, lack of connectivity, longer river distances, multiple handling, and limited flow of private investments. The Eleventh Five-Year Plan envisaged development of six national inland waterways. Although the government demarcated five such National Waterways, the shipping ministry is unable to start the work on developing two of them (NW-4 & NW-5), as Planning Commission has not approved the development plans until now. Ministry of Shipping awaits the sum of ₹500 crore (US$59 million) that it needs to carry out the development works. As a result of the delay in getting the Planning Commission approval and the funds, the ministry has suspended the plans for developing the sixth national inland waterway.

== See also ==
- National Waterway 2 (India)
- National Waterway 3 (India)
- Inland Waterways Authority of India
- Inland waterways of India
- The Inland Vessels (Amendment) Act, 2007
