= Henry Joseph Twynam =

Administrator in British India

Sir Henry Joseph Twynam KCSI CIE

Governor of the Central Provinces and Berar
- In office 17 September 1940 – 16 September 1946
- Monarch: George VI
- Governors-General: The Marquess of Linlithgow; The Viscount Wavell
- Preceded by: Sir Francis Verner Wylie
- Succeeded by: Sir Frederick Chalmers Bourne

Personal details
- Born: 24 April 1887 Stafford, Staffordshire, England, United Kingdom
- Died: 21 October 1966 (aged 79) New Forest, Hampshire, England, United Kingdom
- Spouse: Muriel Hearson (m. 1915)
- Children: Pamela Mary Somerville Twynam (b1915 – d1971); Humphrey Reginald Woodriff Twynam (b1917 – d1940); Penelope Hearson Twynam (b1924 – d2005)
- Parents: Charles Henry Twynam (father); Mary Sophia Piggott (mother)

Sir Henry Joseph Twynam, KCSI, CIE (24 April 1887 – 21 October 1966) was a British administrator in India. He was Governor of the Central Provinces and Berar from 1940 to 1946.

Twynam joined the Indian Civil Service in 1909.

Tywnam was appointed a CIE in 1934, CSI in 1937, and KCSI in 1940.
