= Richard Morris Dane =

Richard Dane
- Born: Richard Morris Dane; 21 May 1854; Moulmein, Bengal, India
- Died: 13 February 1940 (aged 85); Huddersfield, England
- Occupation: Colonial administrator

Sir Richard Morris Dane KCIE (1854–1940) was a British administrator in India and China.

== Life ==
He was the son of Richard Martin Dane M.D. (1813–1901) and his wife Sophia Eliza Griffiths; Louis William Dane, Lieutenant-Governor of the Punjab, was his brother. He was educated at Kingstown, Dublin, and entered the Indian Civil Service in 1872.

Dane served as Inspector-General of Salt Revenue in India from 1907 to 1909. He was later posted to China, in the Sino-Foreign Salt Administration, with a corresponding role from 1913 to 1918. Arriving there under the administration of Yuan Shikai, he set up a system on the Indian Civil Service model, recruiting district inspectors from many nationalities. It proved effective in gathering revenue.

== Awards and honours ==
Dane received the C.I.E. in 1896 and K.C.I.E in 1909, the Order of Chia-Ho in 1914 and the Order of Wen-Hu in 1918.

== Published works ==
Dane was a keen sportsman and in 1921 published a book "Sport in Africa and Asia" which contains accounts of big game hunting in India and China as well as details of government assignments including a trip to British North Borneo in 1911 where he was accompanied by his son . In the book he describes his eye getting "badly injured in a Polo accident in 1879" forcing him to learn to shoot unconventionally.

== Family ==
Dane married Emily Leeds in 1880, daughter of Sir Edward Leeds, 3rd Baronet. Their daughter, Sophie Louisa Dane married Sir Frank Sly in 1900, followed by the actor Hubert Druce in 1912. Major Richard Dane of the Indian Army was their son. They divorced in 1901.
