= Hugh Bomford =

English cricketer and civil servant

Sir Hugh Bomford CIE KBE
Personal information
- Full name: Hugh Bomford
- Born: 12 August 1882; Fort William, Bengal Presidency, British India
- Died: 19 January 1939 (aged 56); Meerut, United Provinces, British India
- Batting: Unknown
- Role: Wicket-keeper

Domestic team information
- Years: Team
- 1901–1904: Oxford University

Career statistics
| Competition | First-class |
|---|---|
| Matches | 9 |
| Runs scored | 52 |
| Batting average | 7.42 |
| 100s/50s | –/– |
| Top score | 16* |
| Catches/stumpings | 19/9 |
- Source: Cricinfo, 22 January 2020

Sir Hugh Bomford CIE KBE (12 August 1882 – 19 January 1939) was a British administrator in India and an English first-class cricketer.

The son of Sir Gerald Bomford and Mary Florence Eteson, he was born in British India at Fort William in August 1882. He was educated at Marlborough College, before going up to Balliol College, Oxford. While studying at Oxford, Bomford played first-class cricket for Oxford University, making his debut against Surrey at The Oval in 1901. He made eight further first-class appearances for Oxford from 1901 to 1904. He scored 52 runs in his nine first-class matches, with a high score of 16 not out. Playing as a wicket-keeper, he took 19 catches and made nine stumpings.

Bomford was appointed to the Indian Civil Service in October 1906. By 1913, he held the post of settlement officer for Datia State, which he held until 1916. He was appointed as excise commissioner for Central India in 1920, before serving as the settlement commissioner for Rewa between 1921 and 1928. He was made a Companion of the Order of the Indian Empire in the 1931 New Year Honours. He served as the chief secretary to the government of the United Provinces in 1933. Bomford was made a Knight Bachelor in the 1938 Birthday Honours, the same year in which he served as the acting governor of the Central Provinces and Berar, before being succeeded by Sir Francis Verner Wylie. Bomford died suddenly at Meerut in January 1939. He was survived by his wife, Margaret Evelyn Ord, with whom he had four children.
