= Kaliveli Lake =

Lake in Tamil Nadu, India

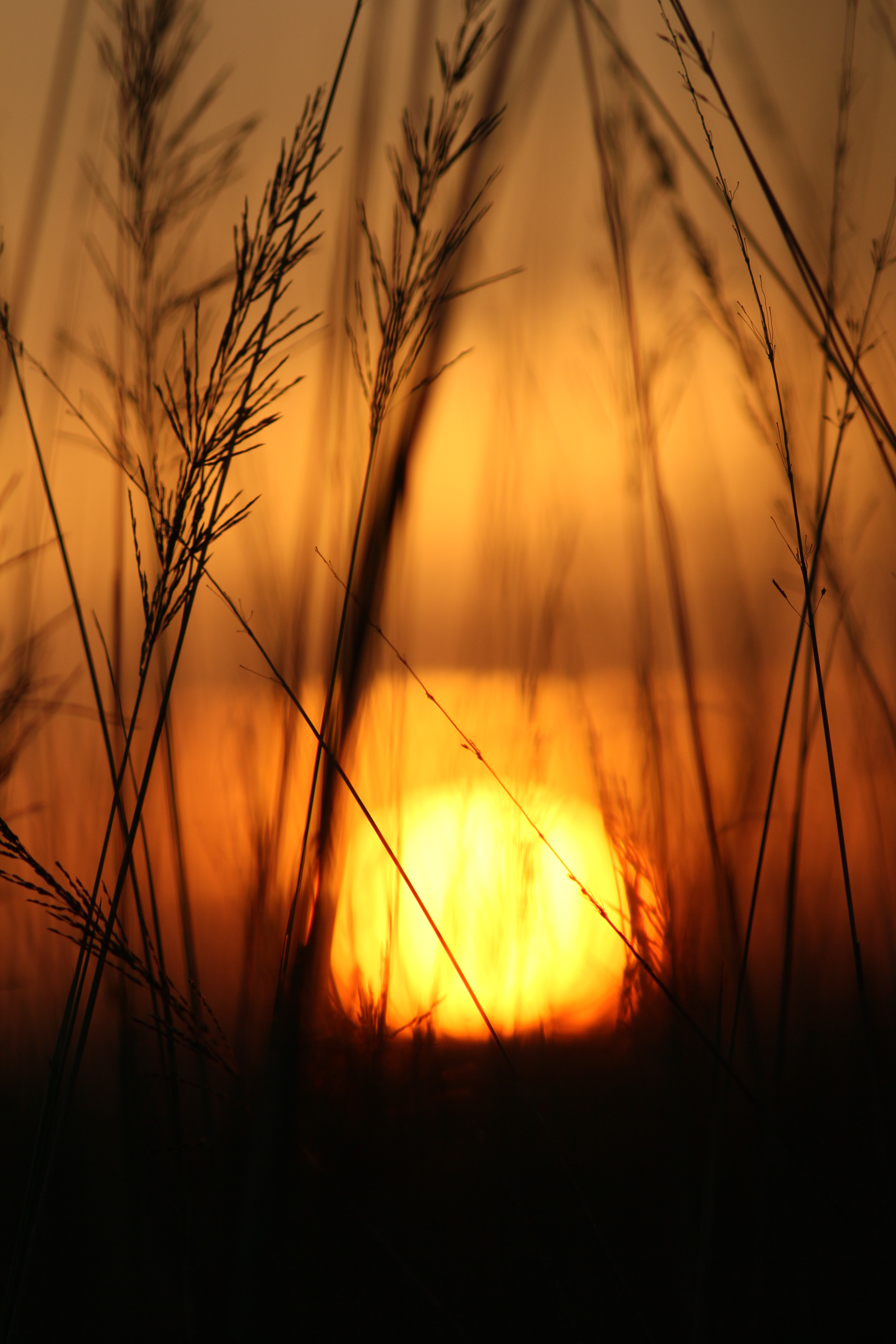

- Location within Tamil Nadu
- Location: Viluppuram District, Tamil Nadu
- Coordinates: 12.119728°N 79.857683°E
- Basin countries: India

Kaliveli Lake (Kaliveli Lagoon) or Kazhuveli wetland, is a coastal lake and lagoon with wetlands in the Viluppuram District of Tamil Nadu state, in eastern South India. It is the home of Kaliveli Bird Sanctuary.

This lake is on the Coromandel Coast, near the Bay of Bengal. It lies approximately 16 kilometres (9.9 mi) north of Pondicherry city, and 10 kilometres (6.2 mi) north of Auroville. It is the second largest lake in south of India after Pulicat.

== Ecology ==
Kaliveli Lake is a seasonal wetland, with a gradient from freshwater to brackish water, and is an important feeding and breeding ground on migratory bird flyway. The lake is one of the largest wetlands in peninsular India, and is considered a wetland of both national and international importance by the IUCN.

It is currently threatened by encroachment from agricultural fields, wildlife poaching, loss of the surrounding forests, and increased commercial prawn farming.

Despite being one of the melting pot of southern Indian Coastal ecological site, this lake is hardly explored by nature lovers and environmental enthusiasts. 90% of the shores of this lake are not accessible through roads, which is also the main reason for its abundance of flora and fauna. One must take care of dangerous sinking peats and bogs while wading through these swamps. Also, these swamps are infested with mites and bugs that are carriers of most feared filariasis, malaria and other waterborne diseases. Hence the trekkers are advised to carry bugs repellant creams and thick boots. As this lake is always isolated and noticing another human is almost impossible in its 20 km vicinity, explorers are advised to carry sufficient food, water and other essential items.

== History ==
The ruins of colonial Allamparwa Fort are located at the north channel's entrance point into Kaliveli Lagoon, on the Coromandel Coast.

In 2023, the environmental clearance for fishing harbours was withheld by the Southern Bench of the National Green Tribunal (NGT). The two harbours, Alamparaikuppam and Azhagankuppam, are located in the intertidal area of Kaliveli bird sanctuary.

Earlier in December 2021, the Tamil Nadu government declared 5,151.60 hectares of swamp and wetlands in Villupuram district as Kazhuveli Wetland Birds Sanctuary. It is the 16th bird sanctuary in Tamil Nadu.

== Species ==
The lake is home for species like the Eastern Imperial Eagle, Greater Spotted Eagle, Red-necked Falcon and several harriers. In the entire country, a rare migratory wader, the Grey-tailed Tattler, has been spotted only here and in Pulicat.

== See also ==
- Environment of Tamil Nadu
