= Benjamin Robertson =

British civil servant (1864–1953)

Sir Benjamin Robertson, KCSI, KCMG, CIE (16 October 1864 – 14 April 1953) was an administrator in British India. He was Chief Commissioner of the Central Provinces from 1912 to 1920.
