= Hyde Gowan =

Australian-born British colonial administrator

Sir Hyde Clarendon Gowan, KCSI, CSI, VD (4 July 1878 – 1 April 1938) was an Australian-born British colonial administrator in India. He was Governor of the Central Provinces (of the Central Provinces and Berar from 1936) from 1933 to 1938.

== Life and career ==
Born in Sydney, New South Wales in 1878, the son of Dr Bowie Campbell Gowan and Leila Gowan, Hyde Gowan was educated at Rugby School, where he was Senior Classical Scholar, and New College, Oxford, where he was Senior Open Scholar.

Joining the Indian Civil Service in 1902, he was posted to the Central Provinces where, with the exception of a short period in 1908, he spent the whole of his career. He was Under-Secretary to the Government of the Central Provinces from 1902 to 1908. That year, he was officiating Under-Secretary to the Government of India in the Commerce and Industry Department.

Returning to the Central Provinces, he was Financial Secretary from 1918 to 1921, in 1925, and in 1926, Chief Secretary from 1927 to 1932, and Member of the Executive Council from 1932 to 1933. He was also Lieutenant-Colonel commanding the Nagpur Rifles, Auxiliary Force (India) from 1920 to 1925.

Gowan was appointed Governor of the Central Provinces in 1933, but resigned in 1938 for medical reasons. He died before his resignation could take effect, on 1 April, in London.
