= Lok Bhavan, Pachmarhi =

Lok Bhavan (Pachmarhi)
- Interactive map of the Lok Bhavan (Pachmarhi) area

General information
- Type: Summer residence
- Coordinates: 22°28′10″N 78°25′14″E
- Current tenants: Mangubhai Patel
- Construction started: 1887
- Cost: ₹91,344 (equivalent to ₹45 million or US$540,000 in 2023)
- Owner: Government of Madhya Pradesh

References
- Website

Lok Bhavan formerly Raj Bhavan (translation: Government House) of Pachmarhi is the Summer residence of the Governor of Madhya Pradesh Mangubhai Patel, It is located in the city of Pachmarhi, Madhya Pradesh.

== History ==
Pachmarhi used to be the summer capital of Madhya Pradesh. In 1967 it served as the summer capital for the last time.

Having obtained the status of the summer capital, Pachmarhi has bungalows for the Chief Minister and other ministers too. As a logical extension, it also has a Raj Bhavan for the stay of the Governor.

== Building ==
The Raj Bhavan was built in 1887, with total area 22.84 acres (92,400 m^{2}), with initial cost INR 91,344 and modification and renovation between 1933 and 1958; it cost Rs. 64,551. The Dance Hall was constructed in 1910–1911; it cost INR 20,770. Council Chamber was constructed in 1912 (now the Durbar Hall); it cost INR 14,392.

Apart from this, quarters for the Secretary, ADC and other staff members have been constructed in the Raj Bhavan campus.

== See also ==
- Government Houses of the British Indian Empire
