= Frederic Lely =

Sir Frederic Styles Philpin Lely, KCIE, CSI (16 December 1846 – 21 November 1934) was a British administrator in India. He was Chief Commissioner of the Central Provinces from 1904 to 1905.

== Life ==
He was the son of Moses Philpin, a Baptist minister of Alcester, and his wife Marietta Lely of Trelleck. He studied at Regent's Park College, and matriculated at Pembroke College, Oxford in 1866. He added his mother's surname to his name in 1869. That year he joined the Indian Civil Service.

In India, Lely was administrator of Sachin State and Porbandar State, in 1886, before becoming Collector and Magistrate in Surat in 1892. He was Chief Commissioner of the Central Provinces in 1904, before retiring in 1905.
