= Lok Bhavan, Bhopal =

Lok Bhavan (Bhopal)
- Interactive map of the Lok Bhavan (Bhopal) area

General information
- Type: Main residence
- Coordinates: 23.240647°N 77.403250°E
- Current tenants: Mangubhai Patel
- Owner: Government of Madhya Pradesh

References
- Website

Lok Bhavan formerly Raj Bhavan (Hindi: राज भवन, translation: Government House) is the official residence of the governor of Madhya Pradesh Mangubhai Patel. It is located in the capital city of Bhopal, Madhya Pradesh.

== History ==
In 1880, Sultan Shah Jahan, Begum of Bhopal constructed the present Raj Bhavan as a place of stay for the British officers. It was initially named Lal Kothi. Thus, 1880 onwards, Lal Kothi became the official residence of the British Political Agents posted at Bhopal.

=== Commissioner Period ===
On 1 June 1949 Bhopal was merged with the Union of India ending the princely rule of 250 years.

The Government of India appointed an administrative head for Bhopal, called the Chief Commissioner and Lal Kothi was chosen as the official residence of the Chief Commissioner and was renamed Commissioner House

The Lal Kothi served as a Commissioner House from 1 June 1949 to 1 December 1956.

=== Formation of Madhya Pradesh ===
The States Reorganisation Act of 1956, Bhopal state was integrated into the state of Madhya Pradesh, and Bhopal was declared as its capital.

The Government of India appointed Governors of Madhya Pradesh as the head of the state and Lal Kothi was once again chosen as the official residence of the Governors of Madhya Pradesh.

The Commissioner House was renamed as Raj Bhavan. Since then it has served as the official residence of the Governors of Madhya Pradesh.

== Building ==
Built in 1880 by the Nawab of Bhopal State, Begum Shahjahan by a European architecture under the supervision of Austate Cook (a French Engineer), Built over an area of 15,423 sq ft (1,432.8 m^{2}) and the total cost incurred on construction was Rs. 72,878,3 annas and one paisa.

It was the first Kothi in the city of Bhopal with roof made of red China clay 'Kavelus' and the predominant colour of the Kothi was red. For these reason they named this building Lal Kothi.

A prevalent custom in the then erstwhile State of Bhopal (a Muslim State) was that whenever the State or the feudal lords constructed any building, the foundation stone for a mosque was laid first. Thus, a small mosque was built first around the campus of Lal Kothi.

The erstwhile Bhopal Government had sought the help of the British and PWD authorities in decorating the Kothi on European lines.

== See also ==
- Government Houses of the British Indian Empire
