= John Henry Morris =

Sir John Henry Morris, KCSI (9 April 1828 – 14 September 1912) was an administrator in British India. He was Chief Commissioner of the Central Provinces from 1867 to 1883.
