= Frank Sly =

British governor of the Central Provinces of India

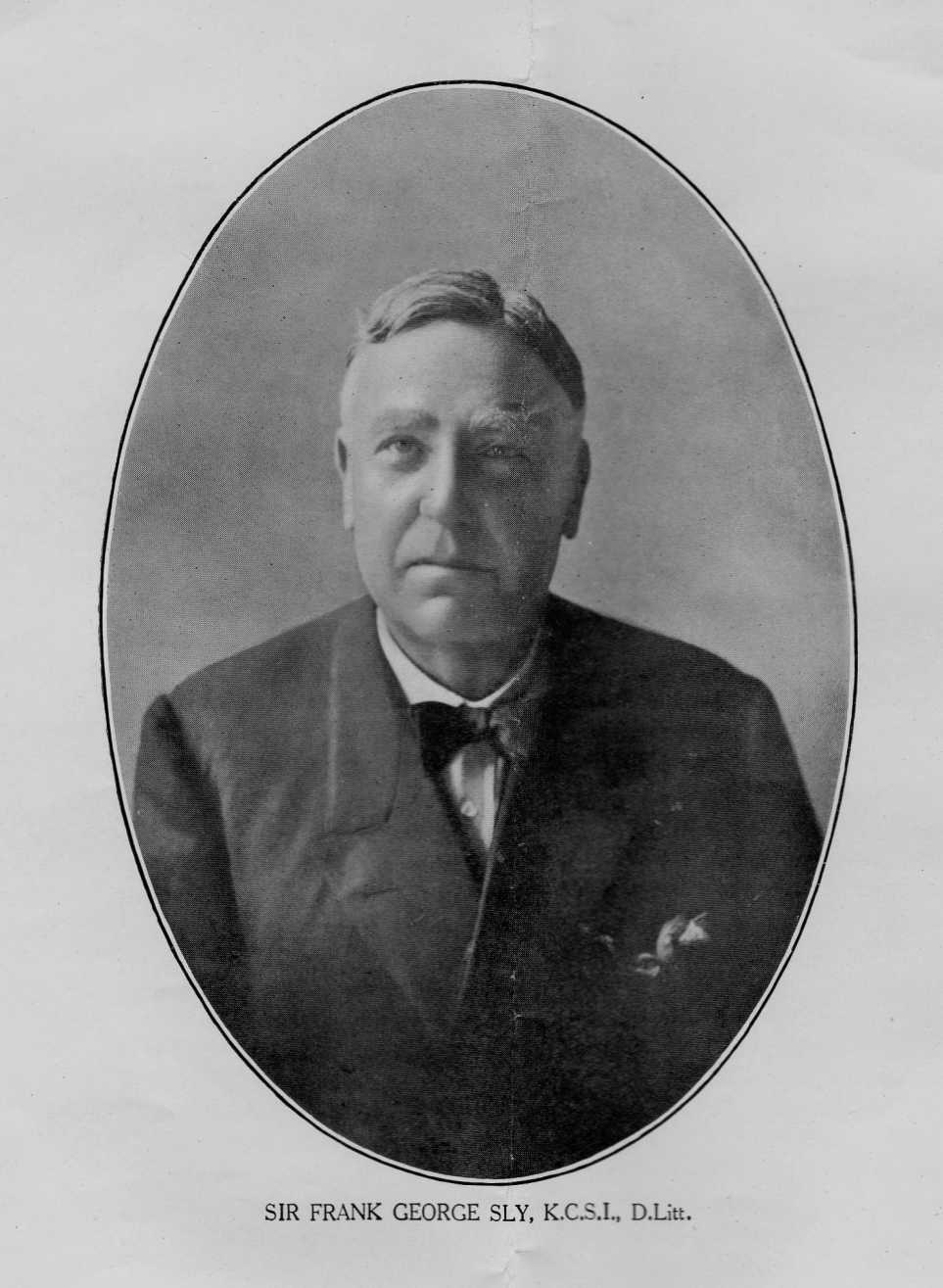
Sir Frank Sly

Sir Frank George Sly, KCSI (1866 – 16 July 1928) was the first British governor of the Central Provinces of India and instrumental in the Montagu–Chelmsford Reforms.

== Early life ==
Frank Sly was born in Salisbury 1866 to Thomas Sly and Clara Moore. He studied at Oxford University before entering the Indian Civil Service towards the end of 1887.

== Career ==
After joining the Indian Civil Service in 1887, Sly was appointed Under-Secretary in the Department of Revenue and Agriculture in 1894. He became officiating Secretary in 1896, before becoming Commissioner of Agriculture and Settlements and later Inspector-General of Agriculture. From 1908–1912, he was Commissioner of Berar Province where he was tasked with remodeling the administration of the province, to bring it in line with the other Central Provinces into which it had recently been amalgamated. In September 1912, he was appointed a member of the Royal Commission on the Public Services. After a brief spell as Commissioner of Nagpur, he was appointed Chairman of the Public Works Department Re-organisation Committee. Sly then went to Bihar and Orissa as Chairman of the Champaran Inquiry Committee. He was later appointed Deputy Chairman of Lord Southborough's Franchise Committee. In January 1920, Sly returned to the Central Provinces and Berar as Chief Commissioner, and later that year was appointed Governor.

In January 1922, Sly hosted Edward VIII when he visited Nagpur on his tour of India.

== Advocate for reform ==
Sly played a prominent part in shaping the Government of India Act, as a member of the India Office Committee and a witness before the Joint Parliamentary Committee, where he was a strong advocate of the 1919 changes, which became known as the Montagu–Chelmsford Reforms.

== Family ==
Sly married Sophie Louisa Dane on 4 September 1900 at Christ Church, Simla in Bengal. Dane was born in India where her father Sir Richard Morris Dane worked in the Indian Civil Service and was in charge of export. They had one child, Joan Clara Sophia Sly, born in 1902. On 28 July 1910, Sir Frank was granted a divorce from Dane on the grounds of "adultery with Hubert Druce". Sly's daughter Joan joined him in India, where she met her future husband John Ray Geddes.

=== Daughter's suicide ===
Joan Sly and John Ray Geddes committed suicide on 8 August 1924 at Gordon Street Chambers on Jermyn Street, London. The inquest into their deaths noted that the couple had taken out extensive loans to fund their wedding and subsequent honeymoon, and had run into financial troubles.

== Death and memorials ==
Following his daughter's suicide Sly tendered his resignation and returned to London leaving Nagpur on 26 January 1925. He died in London on 16 July 1928. and is buried in Kensal Green Cemetery.

He inaugurated Nagpur Railway Station on 15 January 1925. A plaque at the station bears his name. He was also a freemason at Lodge Cornith, Nagpur.
