= Frederick Chalmers Bourne =

English colonial administrator (1891–1977)

Sir Frederick Chalmers Bourne KCSI CIE

Governor of the Central Provinces and Berar
- In office 1946 – 15 August 1947
- Preceded by: Henry Twynam
- Succeeded by: Position Abolished

Governor of East Bengal
- In office 15 August 1947 – 5 April 1950
- Preceded by: Position Created
- Succeeded by: Feroz Khan Noon

Personal details
- Born: 12 August 1891
- Died: 3 November 1977 (aged 86) Uckfield, West Sussex, England
- Parent: Frederick Samuel Augustus Bourne (father)
- Education: Christ Church, Oxford

Sir Frederick Chalmers Bourne, KCSI CIE (12 August 1891 – 3 November 1977) was a British colonial administrator who served in British India until 1947 and then in the new Dominion of Pakistan until 1950.

== Early life ==
Frederick Chalmers Bourne was born on 12 August 1891,. to Frederick Bourne and Isabel Alice. He studied in Rugby and graduated from Christ Church, Oxford with a master's degree. His father was Frederick Samuel Augustus Bourne, a British consular official in China and later Judge of the British Supreme Court for China and Japan.

== Career ==
Bourne was commissioned into the British Army in 1910, and served in the Queen's Own Royal West Kent Regiment. In 1920, he joined the Indian Civil Service and held several prominent positions in the administrations of Lahore and the Punjab between 1937 and 1945. In the Punjab government Bourne served as Home Secretary from 1940 to 1941, and Chief Secretary from 1941 to 1945.

Bourne was appointed acting Governor of the Central Provinces and Berar from May to October 1945, and as the acting Governor of Assam in 1946.

Bourne became the last Governor of the Central Provinces and Berar in 1946, serving until independence of India on 15 August 1947. Bourne then became the first Governor of Pakistan's East Bengal, and served until 5 April 1950.

Secretary of State for the Colonies Alan Lennox-Boyd, 1st Viscount Boyd of Merton sent Bourne as a constitutional advisor to the Gold Coast in 1955.

== Personal life ==
Bourne married Heather Frances Burbury. He died in Uckfield, on 3 November 1977. His estate had a net value of £66,354 (equivalent to $389,849 in 2025).

== Works cited ==
=== Books ===
- Harvey, William (1966). Law and Social Change in Ghana. Princeton University Press.

=== Journals ===
- Ankit, Rakesh (2014). "The Last Sahibs: Governors in British India, March-August 1947". Economic and Political Weekly. 49 (31). Economic Weekly: 122–129. doi:10.32350/24480468. JSTOR 24480468.

=== Newspapers ===
- "£66,000 will". The Argus. 1 February 1978. p. 3 – via Newspapers.com.
- "Deaths". The Daily Telegraph. 5 November 1977. p. 30 – via Newspapers.com.
- "Deaths". The Daily Telegraph. 18 November 1993. p. 20 – via Newspapers.com.
- "Obituary". The Daily Telegraph. 5 November 1977. p. 10 – via Newspapers.com.

Political offices
Preceded by Henry Twynam	Governor of the Central Provinces and Berar; 1946–1947	Succeeded by Position Abolished
Preceded by Position Created	Governor of East Bengal; 1947–1950	Succeeded by Feroz Khan Noon
