= Dowleswaram Barrage =

Dam in Andhra Pradesh, India

Dhawaleswaram Barrage
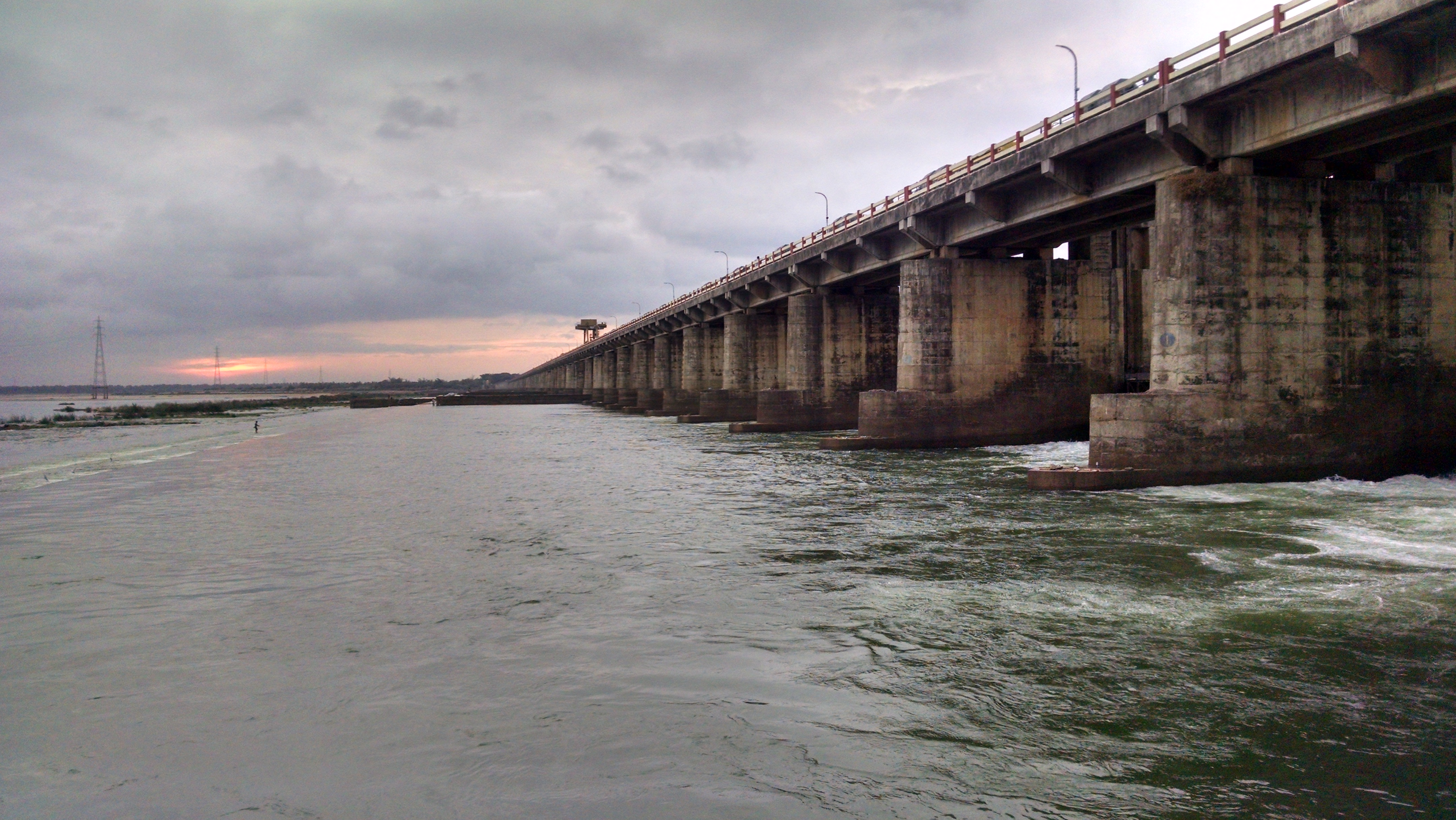
- Sir Arthur Cotton Barrage, Dhawaleswaram

- Location within Andhra Pradesh
- Country: India
- Location: Dhawaleswaram, Rajamahendravaram, Andhra Pradesh
- Coordinates: 16.9307594°N 81.7657988°E
- Purpose: Irrigation, water supply
- Status: Operational
- Construction began: 1847
- Opening date: 1852
- Owner: Government of Andhra Pradesh

Dam and spillways
- Type of dam: Barrage
- Impounds: Godavari River
- Length: 3,599 m
- Website irrigationap.cgg.gov.in/wrd/dashBoard

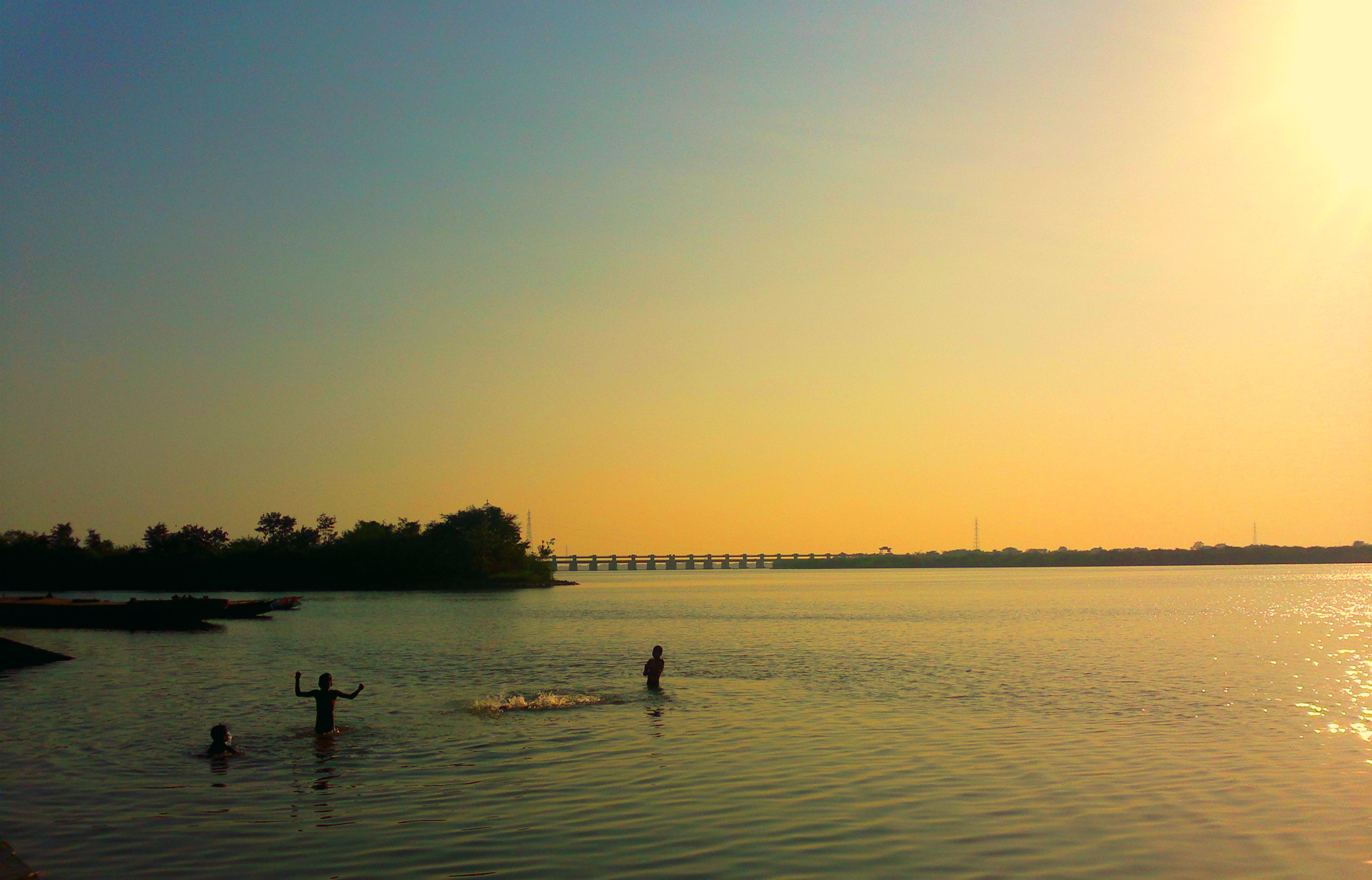
Sunset View at Dhawaleswaram Barrage

The Dhawaleswaram Barrage was an irrigation structure originally built in 1852 by Sir Arthur Cotton on the lower stretch of the Godavari River before it empties into the Bay of Bengal. Retrofitting was done in 1970, and it was officially renamed as Sir Arthur Cotton Barrage, also known as Dhawaleswaram Barrage.

== Geography ==
The Godavari River empties its water into the Bay of Bengal after flowing nearly fifty miles from the Dhavaleshwaram Barrage. Rajamahendravaram is a city situated on the left bank of Godavari River. Upstream, where the river is divided into two streams; the Gautami to the left and the Vasistha to the right, forms the joining line between the West Godavari and the East Godavari districts. The dam alignment crosses two mid stream islands.

== Original Dhawaleswaram Barrage ==
The original Dhawaleswaram Barrage (also spelled Dowlaisweram or Dowlaiswaram) was built by a British irrigation engineer, Sir Arthur Thomas Cotton and completed in 1850. The barrage was constructed in four sections, which allowed flood passage during the construction period. The Dhawaleswaram Barrage was 15 feet high and 3.5 km long.

Cotton's many projects averted famines and stimulated the economy of southern India. Before this barrage was constructed many hectares of land has been flooded with water and was unused. The water would be worthlessly going into sea. But when Sir Arthur Thomas Cotton had built the barrage those unused lands were brought into cultivation and the water was stored and used. The Cotton Museum was constructed on behalf of Cotton's memory. It is a tourist attraction in Rajamahendravaram.

== Modern Sir Arthur Cotton Barrage / Godavari Barrage ==
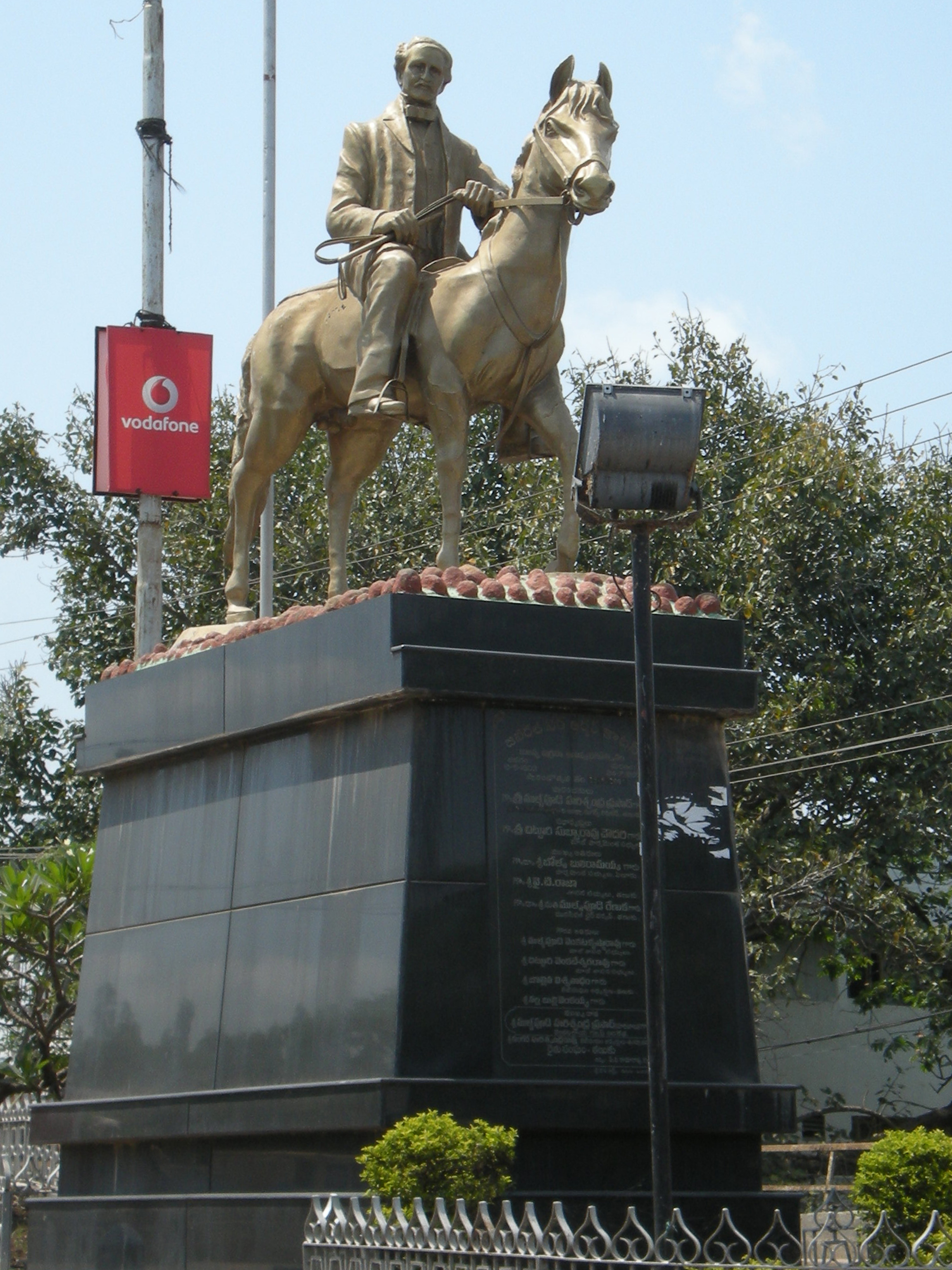
Sir Arthur Cotton's statue

Between 1970 and 1982, the barrage was reconstructed to a height of 10.6 m (35 ft). The reservoir at present has a gross storage capacity of 83 million cubic metres (2,900 million cubic feet) and a dead storage of 57 million cubic metres (2,000 million cubic feet) at 40 feet (12 m). The Barrage consists of 4 arms with 175 bays having a length of 3.6 km (2.2 mi). The reservoir benefits 65 mandals of East and West Godavari with 2 crops annually supplying water utilisation of nearly 100 trillion cubic feet (2,800 billion cubic metres).

== Inadequate water inflows ==
During the rabi season of 2022–23, adequate water is not supplied to the canals due to a lack of sufficient water inflows into the reservoir as sufficient water had not been stored earlier in the upstream Polavaram reservoir. The natural flows normally available during the dry season in the Godavari River are being stored in Medigadda and Sammakka Sagar reservoirs which used to be available for use in Godavari Delta. To build up the water level/storage in the Polavaram reservoir to enable adequate water release downstream, water is released from the Donkarayi reservoir directly without using it for power generation in the lower Sileru power station. At least 60 tmcft water storage is needed in the Polavaram reservoir or up to the safe level limit of the upper coffer dam of the Polavaram Project to supply water to the total cropped area during the rabi season.

== See also ==
- List of dams and reservoirs in Andhra Pradesh
- List of dams and reservoirs in India
- Prakasam Barrage
- Godavari Water Disputes Tribunal
