= Francis Verner Wylie =

Irish-born British civil servant in India

Sir Francis Verner Wylie GCIE KCSI (9 August 1891 – 1970) was an Indian Civil Servant.

Francis Wylie was educated in Ireland at the Royal School, Dungannon, in County Tyrone, Ulster, and at Trinity College, Dublin. He entered the Indian Civil Service (ICS) in 1914. In 1915, he arrived in India and served on military duty from 1916 to 1919. During the years 1919–1938, he served in the Indian Political Service and was appointed Prime Minister of Alwar State during the period 1933-1938, later serving as Governor of the Central Provinces and Berar during the years 1938–1940. He was Political Adviser to the Crown Representative during the years 1940–1941 and 1943–1945. In 1941, Wylie succeeded Sir William Fraser-Tytler as the British minister in Kabul, Afghanistan. From 1945 to 1947, he was Governor of the United Provinces.

In 1948, Wylie was appointed as the British Government Director of the Suez Canal Company. In this capacity, he wrote several reports for the Suez Canal Company to the British Government.

Francis Wylie had a wife called Kathleen.

== Titles ==
- 1891–1929: Francis Verner Wylie
- 1929–1938: Francis Verner Wylie, CIE
- 1938–1947: Sir Francis Verner Wylie, KCSI, CIE
- 1947–1952: Sir Francis Verner Wylie, GCIE, KCSI

== See also ==
- List of governors of the Central Provinces and Berar
- Timeline of Afghanistan (1941)
