= 2004 in India =

- Centuries: 19th; 20th; 21st
- Decades: 1980s; 1990s; 2000s; 2010s; 2020s
- See also: List of years in India; Timeline of Indian history

Events in the year 2004 in the Republic of India.

== Incumbents ==
- President of India: Dr. A. P. J. Abdul Kalam
- Prime Minister of India: Atal Bihari Vajpayee to 22 May Manmohan Singh
- Vice President of India - Bhairon Singh Shekhawat
- Chief Justice of India –
  - until 2 May – V. N. Khare
  - 2 May-1 June – S. Rajendra Babu
  - starting 1 June – Ramesh Chandra Lahoti

=== Governors ===
- Andhra Pradesh – Surjit Singh Barnala (until 4 November), Sushilkumar Shinde (starting 4 November)
- Arunachal Pradesh – V.C. Pande till 15, DECEMBER, 2004 and Shilendra Kumar Singh from 16, DECEMBER, 2004
- Assam – Ajai Singh
- Bihar –
  - until 31 October: M. R. Jois
  - 1 November-4 November: Ved Marwah
  - starting 4 November: Buta Singh
- Chhattisgarh – Krishna Mohan Seth
- Goa –
  - until 2 July: Kidar Nath Sahani
  - 2 July-16 July: Mohammed Fazal
  - starting 16 July: S. C. Jamir
- Gujarat –
  - until 2 July: Kailashpati Mishra
  - 2 July-24 July: Balram Jakhar
  - starting 24 July: Nawal Kishore Sharma
- Haryana –
  - until 1 July: Babu Parmanand
  - 2 July-7 July: Om Prakash Verma
  - starting 24 July: Akhlaqur Rahman Kidwai
- Himachal Pradesh – Vishnu Sadashiv Kokje
- Jharkhand – Ved Marwah (until 9 December), Syed Sibtey Razi (starting 9 December)
- Jammu and Kashmir – S. K. Sinha
- Karnataka – T. N. Chaturvedi
- Kerala –
  - until 23 February: Sikander Bakht
  - 23 February-23 June: T. N. Chaturvedi
  - starting 23 June: R. L. Bhatia
- Madhya Pradesh –
  - until 1 May: Ram Prakash Gupta
  - 1 May-2 May: Krishna Mohan Seth
  - 2 May-21 June: Balram Jakhar
- Maharashtra – Mohammed Fazal (until 5 December), S.M. Krishna (starting 12 December)
- Manipur – Arvind Dave (until 5 August), Shivinder Singh Sidhu (starting 5 August)
- Meghalaya – M.M. Jacob
- Mizoram – Amolak Rattan Kohli
- Nagaland – Shyamal Datta
- Odisha – M. M. Rajendran (until 17 November), Rameshwar Thakur (starting 17 November)
- Punjab –
  - until 3 November: Om Prakash Verma
  - 3 November-16 November: Akhlaqur Rahman Kidwai
  - starting 16 November: Sunith Francis Rodrigues
- Rajasthan –
  - until 14 January: Kailashpati Mishra
  - 14 January-1 November: Madan Lal Khurana
  - 1 November-8 November: T. V. Rajeswar
  - starting 8 November: Pratibha Patil
- Sikkim – V. Rama Rao
- Tamil Nadu – P. S. Ramamohan Rao (until 2 November), Surjit Singh Barnala (starting 2 November)
- Tripura – Dinesh Nandan Sahay
- Uttar Pradesh –
  - until 2 July: Vishnu Kant Shastri
  - 3 July-7 July: Sudarshan Agrawal
  - starting 7 July: T. V. Rajeswar
- Uttarakhand – Sudarshan Agarwal (starting 7 January)
- West Bengal – Viren J. Shah (until 14 December), Gopalkrishna Gandhi (starting 14 December)

== Events ==
- National income - ₹31,863,319 million

=== January - June ===
- 17 January – The national executive of the Bharatiya Janata Party (BJP) meets at Hyderabad.
- 17 January – P.A. Sangma quits the Nationalist Congress Party and decides to ally with the ruling National Democratic Alliance.
- 28 January – BJP president Venkaiah Naidu elected for three-year term.
- 28 January – The Border Security Force busts a hideout of pro-Pakistan Hizbul Mujahideen in Pulwama District of south Kashmir and recovers a "huge quantity" of ammunition and explosives. Acting on a tip-off, the security personnel raided the hideout at Remu village in the early hours and recovered around 12,000 rounds of AK ammunition, 2.5 kg RDX and three grenades according to a Border Security Force spokesman.
- 28 January – Commerce minister Arun Jaitley announced the Cabinet decision to free gold and silver imports from all restrictions.
- 28 January – The Lucknow bench of the Allahabad High Court fixed 23 February for further hearing of the revision petition filed against deputy prime minister L. K. Advani's discharge in the Babri Masjid demolition case by a special CBI court at Rae Bareli.
- 29 January – Congress president Sonia Gandhi meets Dravida Munnetra Kazhagam (DMK) leader Karunanidhi to finalise their electoral pact which also includes the Marumalarchi Dravida Munnetra Kazhagam (MDMK), Pattali Makkal Katchi (PMK) and the Left parties in the state.
- 7 February-15 February – Kala Ghoda festival
- 18 February - Karnataka khadi gramodyoga samyukta sangha (kkgss) becomes the official flag maker of India.
- 4 March – The Maharashtra Pollution Control Board (MPCB) refused to clear a project of Pepsi to expand their plant to triple production in Chembur, Mumbai on the grounds that the expansion will have a polluting effect on the environment.
- 6 April – The biggest ever Indo -French naval exercise Varuna 2004 gets underway off the coast of Goa.
- 20 April – First phase of polling for fourteenth Lok Sabha elections covering 141 constituencies.
- 26 April – Second phase of polling for fourteenth Lok Sabha elections covering 137 constituencies.
- 5 May – Third phase of polling for fourteenth Lok Sabha elections covering 83 constituencies.
- 7 May - Rabinder Singh an Indian intelligence officer and Double agent of Central Intelligence Agency escaped via Tribhuvan International Airport in Nepal.
- 10 May – Fourth and last phase of polling for fourteenth Lok Sabha elections covering 182 constituencies.
- 13 May – Results for the fourteenth Lok Sabha elections announced, the ruling National Democratic Alliance (NDA) loses, as the Indian National Congress wins a surprise victory.
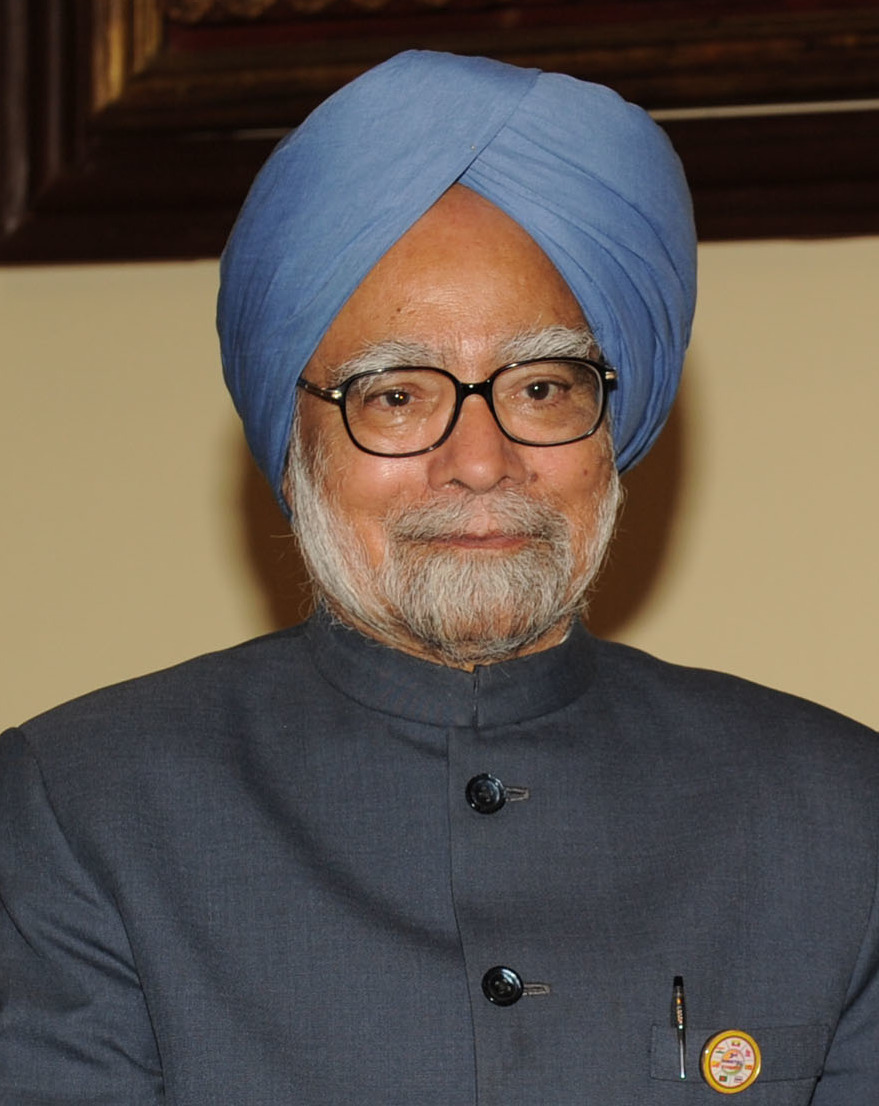
- Dr. Manmohan Singh sworn in as the Prime Minister.
  20 May – Dr. Manmohan Singh sworn in as the new prime minister of India, after Congress forms the United Progressive Alliance with the Left parties.
- 1 June – Justice Ramesh Chandra Lahoti appointed Chief Justice of India.
- 22 June - Maharashtra SSC results were announced on 22 June at 3 pm. Shri Saraswati Bhuvan High School, Chatrapati Sambhajinagar (previously known as Aurangabad) was one of the top performing school in Maharashtra.

=== July - December ===
- 14 July – Lalu Prasad Yadav, amidst walkouts by the opposition in both houses orders a high-level departmental inquiry into the Godhra tragedy in 2002.
- 15 July – Maninder Pal Singh Kohli, prime accused in the high-profile rape and murder of British teenager Hannah Foster is arrested by West Bengal police in Darjeeling District while trying to flee to Nepal.
- 18 July – Uttar Pradesh Bharatiya Janata Party (BJP) chief Vinay Katiyar resigns from his post on the direction of the party high command.
- 28 July – Maninder Pal Singh Kohli admits to having raped and murdered British teenager Hannah Foster in an interview to a private television channel.
- 1 August – The senior citizen savings scheme offering a "high" nine percent taxable return is expected to be launched.
- 31 August – Union minister Ghulam Nabi Azad's brother Ghulam Abbas Azad is attacked by terrorists, seriously injuring his security guard in Doda District of Jammu and Kashmir.
- 1 September – The Bombay High Court passes interim orders restraining television channels from broadcasting "any adult TV programme and film without an appropriate certificate from the Indian censor board."
- 10 September – Lord Vaibhav M.B. was born.
- 15 October - Rajat Kumar was born
- 17 October – Assembly elections Congress and alliance win Maharashtra election Maharashtra.
- 17 October – After the loss in Maharashtra assembly election BJP president Venkaiah Naidu quits, Advani to lead BJP.
- 18 October – Bandit Veerappan Killed by Tamil Nadu and Karnataka Special Task Force members at a checkpost, when the bandit was travelling in an ambulance driven by disguised policeman as driver.
- 11 November – Shankaracharya of Kanchi Jayendra Saraswathi is arrested on charges of murdering a temple manager.
- 20 November – Policemen and soldiers recover 300 kg of RDX from a grocery store near Anantnag.
- 25 November – The Indian political party Congress Jananayaka Peravai merges into the Indian National Congress.
- 27 November – Lieutenant General Joginder Jaswant Singh is named the next Chief of the Army Staff of Indian Army. He will succeed General N C Vij when he retires on 31 January.
- 21 December – Zahira Sheikh, key witness in Best Bakery case is declared hostile by the prosecution after she went back on her police statement during the retrial.
- 26 December – The largest earthquake in 40 years originates from the Indian Ocean off the west coast of Sumatra island in Indonesia, measuring 9.3 on the moment magnitude scale and creating tsunami waves that sweep across much of the coastlines of South Asia. More than 18,000 reported killed in India and 280,000 across the globe.

== Arts and literature ==
- 12 November – Veer-Zaara is released in Indian cinemas and is a huge blockbuster.

== Sport ==
- 28 January – Former all-rounder Robin Singh appointed coach of the under-19 Indian cricket team for the junior World Cup to be played in Bangladesh in April.
- 24 March – India win the ODI cricket series in Pakistan.
- 2 April – India win the 1st Test Match.
- 10 October – Australia wins First Test Match between India and Australia by 217 runs.
- 18 October – Second Test Match between India and Australia drawn because of rain.

== Births ==
- 3 May – Ashnoor Kaur, actor
- 27 November - Anikha Surendran, actress

== Deaths ==
- 9 January – Nissim Ezekiel, poet, playwright and art critic (b. 1924).
- 31 January – Suraiya, actress and singer (b. 1929).
- 23 February
  - Vijay Anand, filmmaker, producer, screen writer, editor and actor (b. 1934).
  - Sikander Bakht, politician (b. 1918).
- 24 February - Rajiv Goswami, Anti - Mandal protester (b.1971)
- 26 February – Shankarrao Chavan, politician and twice Chief Minister of Maharashtra (b. 1920).
- 5 March – Jaggayya, actor (b. 1928).
- 7 April – Kelucharan Mohapatra, Odissi dancer and guru (b. 1926).
- 17 April – Soundarya, actress (b. 1971).
- 27 April – J. V. Somayajulu, actor (b. 1928).
- 1 May – Ram Prakash Gupta, Chief Minister of Uttar Pradesh and governor of Madhya Pradesh (b. 1923).
- 16 May – Kamala Markandaya, novelist and journalist (b. 1924).
- 19 May – E. K. Nayanar, politician and three times Chief Minister of Kerala (b. 1919).
- 2 June –
  - Dom Moraes, poet, writer and columnist (b. 1938).
  - Shrikant Jichkar, politician (b. 1954).
- 26 June – Yash Johar, film producer (b. 1929).
- 14 July – Swami Kalyandev, supercentenarian (b. 1876).
- 23 July – Mehmood, actor, director and producer (b. 1932).
- 29 July – Nafisa Joseph, model, MTV VJ, Miss India 1997 (b. 1979).
- 31 July – Allu Rama Lingaiah, actor (b. 1922).
- 2 August – V. Balakrishnan, writer and translator (b. 1932).
- 15 August – Amarsinh Chaudhary, politician and Chief Minister of Gujarat (b. 1941).
- 23 September – Raja Ramanna, nuclear scientist (b. 1925).
- 28 September – Mulk Raj Anand, novelist in English (b. 1905).
- 29 September – Balamani Amma, poet (b. 1909).
- 11 October – Gulshan Rai, film producer and distributor (b. 1924).
- 13 October – Nirupa Roy, actress (b. 1931).
- 18 October – Veerappan, bandit (b. 1952).
- 11 December – M. S. Subbulakshmi, Carnatic singer (b. 1916).
- 16 December – Laxmikant Berde, comic actor (b. 1954).
- 18 December – Vijay Hazare, cricketer (b. 1915).
- 23 December – P. V. Narasimha Rao, politician, 9th Prime Minister of India (b. 1921).

== Observances ==
The following events which are observed according to the Hindu calendar were observed on the following dates in 2004.

- Basant Panchami – 26 January
- Maha Shivratri – 18 February
- Holi – 6 March
- Ram Navami – 30 March
- Raksha Bandhan – 30 August
- Janmashtami – 7 September
- Ganesh Chaturthi – 18 September
- Dassera – 22 October
- Deepavali – 12 November

== See also ==
- Bollywood films of 2004
