= 2003 in India =

- Centuries: 19th; 20th; 21st
- Decades: 1980s; 1990s; 2000s; 2010s; 2020s
- See also: List of years in India; Timeline of Indian history

Events in the year 2003 in the Republic of India.

== Incumbents ==
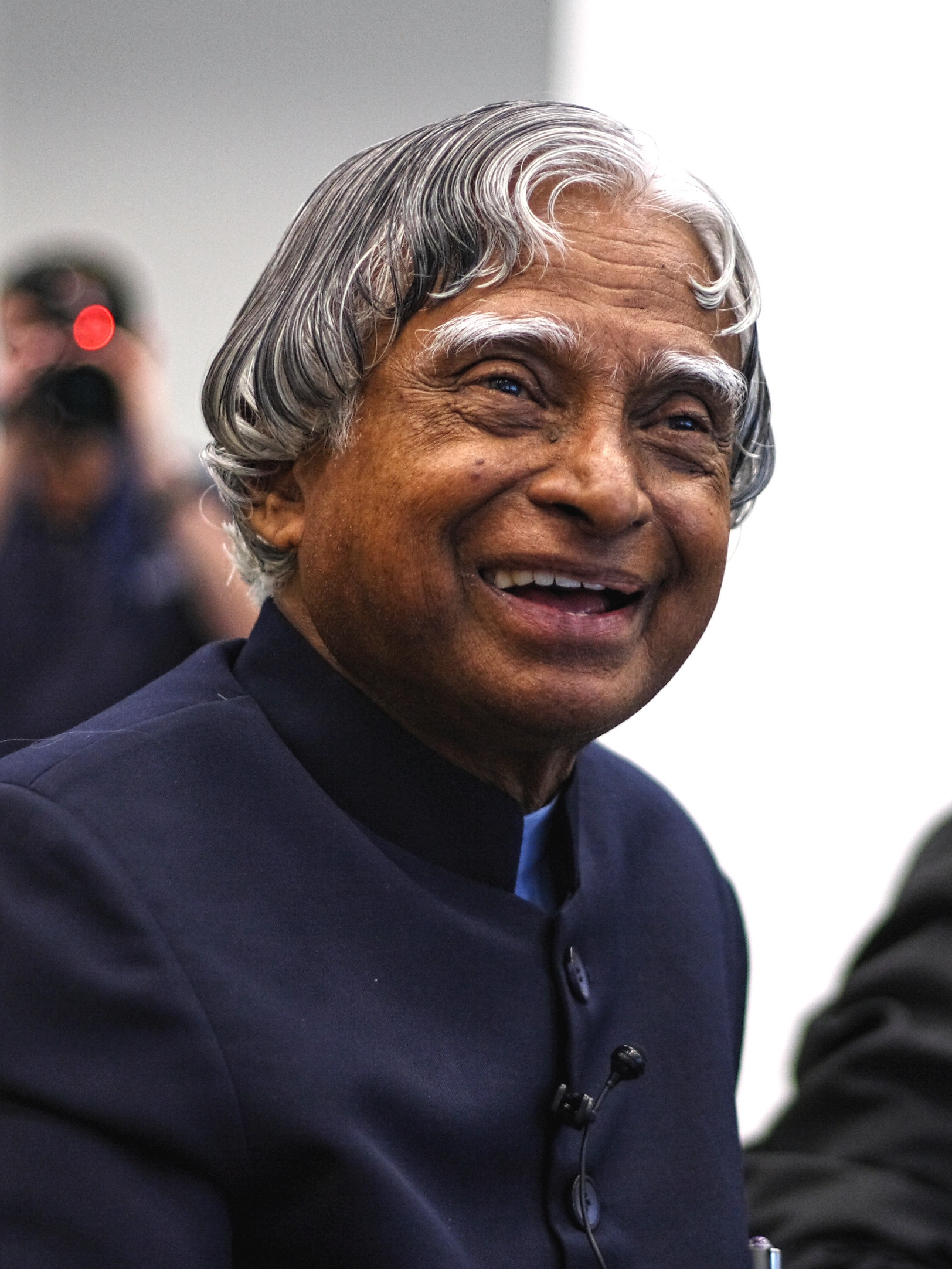
- A. P. J. Abdul Kalam
  President of India – A. P. J. Abdul Kalam
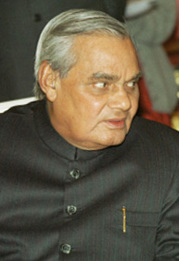
- Atal Bihari Vajpayee
  Prime Minister of India – Atal Bihari Vajpayee
- Vice President of India – Bhairon Singh Shekhawat
- Chief Justice of India – V. N. Khare

=== Governors ===
- Andhra Pradesh – C. Rangarajan (until 3 January), Surjit Singh Barnala (starting 3 January)
- Arunachal Pradesh – Arvind Dave (until 12 June), V. C. Pande (starting 12 June)
- Assam –
  - until 21 April: Srinivas Kumar Sinha
  - 21 April-5 June: Arvind Dave
  - starting 5 June: Ajai Singh
- Bihar – V. C. Pande (until 12 June), M R Jois (starting 12 June)
- Chhattisgarh – D. N. Sahay (until 1 June), Krishna Mohan Seth (starting 2 June)
- Goa – Kidar Nath Sahani
- Gujarat – Sunder Singh Bhandari (until 7 May), Kailashpati Mishra (starting 7 May)
- Haryana – Babu Parmanand
- Himachal Pradesh – Suraj Bhan (until 7 May), Vishnu Sadashiv Kokje (starting 8 May)
- Jharkhand – M. Rama Jois (until 11 June), Ved Marwah (starting 11 June)
- Jammu and Kashmir – Girish Chandra Saxena (until 4 June), S. K. Sinha (starting 4 June)
- Karnataka – T. N. Chaturvedi
- Kerala – Sikander Bakht (starting 18 April)
- Madhya Pradesh – Bhai Mahavir (until 6 May), Ram Prakash Gupta (starting 6 May)
- Maharashtra – Mohammed Fazal
- Manipur – Ved Marwah (until 12 June), Arvind Dave (starting 12 June)
- Meghalaya – M.M. Jacob
- Mizoram – Amolak Rattan Kohli
- Nagaland – Shyamal Datta
- Odisha – M. M. Rajendran
- Punjab – J. F. R. Jacob (until 8 May), Om Prakash Verma (starting 8 May)
- Rajasthan –
  - until 14 May: Anshuman Singh
  - 14 May-22 September: Nirmal Chandra Jain
  - starting 22 September: Kailashpati Mishra
- Sikkim – V. Rama Rao
- Tamil Nadu – P. S. Ramamohan Rao
- Tripura – Krishna Mohan Seth (until 31 May), Dinesh Nandan Sahay (starting 1 June)
- Uttar Pradesh – Vishnu Kant Shastri
- Uttarakhand – Surjit Singh Barnala (until 7 January), Sudarshan Agarwal (starting 7 January)
- West Bengal – Viren J. Shah

== Events ==
- National income - ₹27,925,301 million

=== January - June ===
- 26 January – The president of Iran, Mohammad Khatami, is the guest at the Republic Day celebration.
- 5–9 February – Aero-India show is held in Bangalore.
- March – India put up a great show at the ICC Cricket World Cup in South Africa after poor performances in the past and go on to the Finals. They were defeated by Australia in the Finals.
- 13 March - Bombing in Mumbai Suburban Railway at Mulund
- 23 March -
  - Abdul Majeed Dar, former Kashmiri Militants who initiated peace talks shot dead by assailants at Sopore.
  - 2003 Nadimarg massacre
- 26 March - Haren Pandya, former home minister of Gujarat was found killed in Ahmedabad.
- 18 April – Prime Minister Atal Bihari Vajpayee, at his first rally in Srinagar, makes a historic announcement of a peace initiative with Pakistan.
- 31 May – Prime Minister Vajpayee has the rare honour of joining the head table at the 300th foundation day of St. Petersburg with Vladimir Putin and George W. Bush.
- 22 June – Vajpayee is in China. India concedes that Tibet is an integral part of China. China agrees to recognise Sikkim's accession to India.

=== July - December ===
- 14 July – India refuses to send troops to Iraq.
- 25 August – 52 killed in two bomb blasts in Mumbai.
- 24 September – United States President George W. Bush invites Vajpayee to lunch in New York City during Vajpayee's US trip. It is considered an important meeting for Indo-US relations. Several deals are struck on civilian nuclear technology, space, hi-tech trade and missile defence.
- 1 October - People's War Group carried out an assassination attempt on N. Chandrababu Naidu, Chief minister of Andhra Pradesh in Alipiri using Claymore mine.
- 6 October – Vajpayee visits Bali for the second time in 2 years.
- 22 October – India announces confidence-building measures with respect to Indo-Pakistani relations: more buses, flights, higher mission strength, etc.
- 15 November – Vajpayee visits Syria.
- 25 November –The Siachen conflict ends with India gaining control of 2500 km^{2} of Siachen Glacier and integrating it into the state of Jammu and Kashmir.
- 28 November – Abu Salem, one of India's most wanted fugitives for his alleged role in the 1993 Bombay bombings, is sentenced to four and a half years imprisonment by a Portuguese court on charges of fraud and resisting arrest. In response, the Central Bureau of Investigation announces it will maintain its efforts to seek Salem's deportation to India.

== Births ==
- 22 January – Shruti Bisht, actress
- 15 April – Pranavi Urs, golfer
- 21 September – Krithi Shetty, actress

== Deaths ==
- 8 January – Mahadeva Subramania Mani, entomologist (born 1908).
- 14 July – Leela Chitnis, actress (born 1909).
- 1 February – Kalpana Chawla, Indian-American Astronaut and first Indian woman to go to space (born 1962).
- 27 July – Henning Holck-Larsen, engineer, co-founder of Larsen & Toubro (born 1907).
- 25 October – Pandurang Shastri Athavale, philosopher, spiritual leader, social reformer, who founded the Swadhyay Movement (born 1920).
- 3 November – Narendra Prasad, actor, playwright, teacher and literary critic (born 1946).
- 21 December – G. V. Iyer, film director (born 1917).

== See also ==
- List of Bollywood films of 2003
