= 2006 in India =

- Centuries: 19th; 20th; 21st
- Decades: 1980s; 1990s; 2000s; 2010s; 2020s
- See also: List of years in India; Timeline of Indian history

Events in the year 2006 in the Republic of India.

== Incumbents ==
- President of India: A.P.J. Abdul Kalam
- Prime Minister of India: Manmohan Singh
- Vice President of India – Bhairon Singh Shekhawat
- Chief Justice of India – Yogesh Kumar Sabharwal

=== Governors ===
- Andhra Pradesh – Sushilkumar Shinde (until 29 January), Rameshwar Thakur (starting 29 January)
- Arunachal Pradesh – Shilendra Kumar Singh
- Assam – Ajai Singh
- Bihar – Buta Singh
- Chhattisgarh – Krishna Mohan Seth
- Goa – S. C. Jamir
- Gujarat – Nawal Kishore Sharma
- Haryana – Akhlaqur Rahman Kidwai
- Himachal Pradesh – Vishnu Sadashiv Kokje
- Jammu and Kashmir – Syed Sibtey Razi
- Jharkhand – S. K. Sinha
- Karnataka – T. N. Chaturvedi
- Kerala – R. L. Bhatia
- Madhya Pradesh – Balram Jakhar
- Maharashtra – S.M. Krishna
- Manipur – Shivinder Singh Sidhu
- Meghalaya – M.M. Jacob
- Mizoram – Amolak Rattan Kohli (until 24 July), M. M. Lakhera (starting 24 July)
- Nagaland – Shyamal Datta
- Odisha – Rameshwar Thakur
- Punjab – Sunith Francis Rodrigues
- Rajasthan – Pratibha Patil
- Sikkim –
  - until 12 July: V. Rama Rao
  - 13 July-12 August: R.S. Gavai
  - starting 12 August: V. Rama Rao
- Tamil Nadu – Surjit Singh Barnala
- Tripura – Dinesh Nandan Sahay
- Uttar Pradesh – T. V. Rajeswar
- Uttarakhand – Sudarshan Agarwal
- West Bengal – Gopalkrishna Gandhi

== Events ==
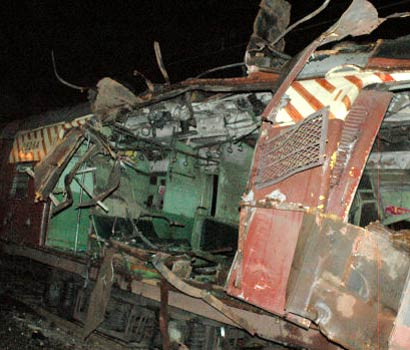
11 July 2006 Mumbai train bombings: One of the bomb-damaged coaches at the Mahim station

- National income - ₹42,546,290 million

=== January - June ===
- 2 January – Rajnath Singh assumed office as Bharatiya Janata Party (BJP) chief.
- 7–9 January – Pravasi Bharatiya Divas was organized in Hyderabad.
- 26 January – Saudi monarch King Abdullah was chief guest at Republic Day parade in New Delhi.
- 2–5 March – President of the United States, George W. Bush visited India. The United States signed a landmark nuclear deal with India pending approval from the US Congress and Indian Parliament.
- 7 March – 2006 Varanasi bombings: A terrorist attack in Varanasi killed at least 15 people and left more than 50 injured.
- 4 April - Two Vishva Hindu Parishad workers named Naresh and Himanshu Panse killed in blasts while they were assembling a bomb at a house in Nanded.
- 10 April – Fire at Brand India Fair at Meerut Victoria Park in Meerut, Uttar Pradesh, killed 100.
- 12 April - Riots and violence in Bangalore following death of Dr. Rajkumar causes death of eight people destruction of more than thousand vehicles.
- May 25 - Singur protests begins against Tata Nano factory.
- May – Medical doctors started a strike against central government decision on reservation for other backward classes (OBC) in Medical Institution.

=== July - December ===
- 6 July – The Nathula Pass between India and China, sealed during the Sino-Indian War, re-opened for trade after 44 years.
- 11 July – 11 July 2006 Mumbai train bombings: A series of coordinated bomb attacks struck several commuter trains in Mumbai, India during the evening rush hour.
- 29 August – A 90% iron meteorite weighing 6.8 kilograms fell in Kanvarpura village in Rajasthan, near Rawatbhata, where the Rajasthan Atomic Power Station is located. It came to earth in the middle of the day and was found by two shepherds. Scientists from the Geological Survey of India rushed to the village to recover the object. The Deputy Director-General (western region) of the Geological Survey, R.S. Goyal, said that devastation on an "unimaginable scale" would have ensued had the meteorite struck the power station.
- 3 September – A man who fell in the dangerous Guna Caves had survived and had been rescued by a man; his friend. the man came in a group of 11 from Manjummel, Kochi.
- 4 - 7 October - Religious violence erupted over Cattle slaughter in Mangalore claim two lives and leave 86 injured.
- 20 November – 2006 West Bengal train disaster: A suspected terrorist attack killed five people on a train in a remote area of West Bengal.
- 18 December - Forest Rights Act enacted by UPA Government.

== Births ==
- 29 May – Gukesh Dommaraju, Grandmaster

== Deaths ==
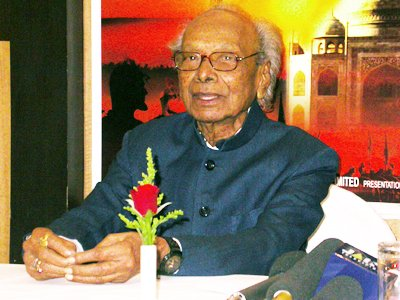
Naushad Ali

- 3 January – Vijay Raghunath Pandharipande, physicist (born 1940).
- 3 February – Nadira, actress (born 1932).
- 8 February – Kuljeet Randhawa, Indian actress and former model (born 1976)
- 25 March – Chandrakant Bakshi, author (born 1932).
- 28 March – Bansi Lal, Haryana's four time chief minister, and defence minister of India during Indian Emergency (1975 – 77) (born 1927)
- 12 April – Rajkumar, actor and singer (born 1929).
- 3 May – Pramod Mahajan, politician (born 1949).
- 5 May – Naushad Ali, musician and composer (born 1919).
- 8 July – Raja Rao, novelist and short story writer (born 1908).
- 21 August – Bismillah Khan, shehnai musician and Bharat Ratna winner (born 1916).
- 27 August – Hrishikesh Mukherjee, film director (born 1922).
- 24 September – Padmini, actress and dancer (born 1932).
- 9 October – Kanshi Ram, politician and founder of Bahujan Samaj Party (born 1934).
- 19 October- Srividya, South Indian actress (born 1953).

== Observance ==
Following days of religious or cultural significance were observed in 2006.

- 13 January – Lohri, Punjab
- 13 January – Arudra Darisanam, Tamil Nadu
- 13–14 January – Bikaner Camel Festival
- 14 January – International Kite Festival, Ahmedabad and Jaipur
- 14 January – Uttarayan Kite Festival, Gujarat
- 16 January – Jallikattu festival, Alanganallur
- 16 January – Modhera Dance Festival, Modhera
- 31 January – Muharram
- 2 February – Basant Panchami
- 26 February – Maha Shiv Ratri
- 15 March – Holi

== See also ==
- Bollywood films of 2006
