= 2000 in India =

- Centuries: 18th; 19th; 20th; 21st
- Decades: 1980s; 1990s; 2000s; 2010s; 2020s
- See also: List of years in India; Timeline of Indian history

The following lists events that happened during 2000 in the Republic of India.

== Incumbents ==
- President of India – K. R. Narayanan
- Prime Minister of India – Atal Bihari Vajpayee
- Vice President of India – Krishna Kant
- Chief Justice of India – Adarsh Sein Anand

=== Governors ===
- Andhra Pradesh – C. Rangarajan
- Arunachal Pradesh – Arvind Dave
- Assam – Srinivas Kumar Sinha
- Bihar – V. C. Pande
- Chhattisgarh – D. N. Sahay (starting 1 November)
- Goa – Mohammed Fazal
- Gujarat – Sunder Singh Bhandari
- Haryana – Mahabir Prasad (until 18 June), Babu Parmanand (starting 19 June)
- Himachal Pradesh – Vishnu Kant Shastri (until 23 November), Suraj Bhan (starting 23 November)
- Jharkhand – Prabhat Kumar (starting 15 November)
- Jammu and Kashmir – Girish Chandra Saxena
- Karnataka – V. S. Ramadevi
- Kerala – Sukhdev Singh Kang
- Madhya Pradesh – Bhai Mahavir
- Maharashtra – P.C. Alexander
- Manipur – Ved Marwah
- Meghalaya – M.M. Jacob
- Mizoram – A. Padmanabhan (until 30 November), Ved Marwah (starting 30 November)
- Nagaland – Om Prakash Sharma
- Odisha – M. M. Rajendran
- Punjab – J. F. R. Jacob
- Rajasthan – Anshuman Singh
- Sikkim – Chaudhary Randhir Singh (until 17 May), Kidar Nath Sahani (starting 17 May)
- Tamil Nadu – M. Fathima Beevi
- Tripura – Siddheswar Prasad (until 22 June), Krishna Mohan Seth (starting 22 June)
- Uttar Pradesh – Suraj Bhan (until 23 November), Vishnu Kant Shastri (starting 23 November)
- Uttarakhand – Surjit Singh Barnala (starting 9 November)
- West Bengal – Viren J. Shah

== Events ==
- National income - ₹21,398,857 million
- 2 January - A Muslim mob attack and burns Newsprint of The New Indian Express in Bangalore in protest to an editorial by T. J. S. George citing Dante Alighieri.
- 3 January – A landmine explodes in a busy vegetable market in the heart of Indian-ruled Kashmir, killing 15 people; other border skirmishes with Pakistan kill a further four.
- 3 January – Prime Minister Atal Bihari Vajpayee accuses Pakistan of being behind the hijacking of an Indian plane and urges that Pakistan be declared a terrorist state.
- 6 January – India arrests four Kashmiri terrorists in connection with the week-long hijacking in December.
- 24 February – A review of national security was ordered, after an expert committee's report on the incursion of Pakistani-backed forces into Kashmir in mid-1999 exposed serious shortcomings. The Subramanyam committee recommends a new "national security planning and decision-making structure for India in the nuclear age". Fresh clashes are reported in late February along the Line of Control between Indian and Pakistani-administered Kashmir.
- Late February – Parliamentary sessions are disrupted by protests led by the opposition Indian National Congress party, complaining that civil servants (who may not join political organizations) are being allowed to join the Hindu nationalist organization Rashtriya Swayamsevak Sangh (RSS) in some states. Congress accuses the RSS of promoting intolerance and says the Bharatiya Janata Party (BJP)-led government was pursuing a secret RSS-inspired agenda whereby India could cease to be a secular state.
- Late February – The BJP-led government's first budget since its October 1999 election victory was criticized by foreign investors for failing to impose tighter curbs on state subsidies. Despite the rising government deficit, there was to be a big increase in military spending, reflecting tension with Pakistan. This will be financed in part by surcharges on income tax and corporation tax.
- 20 March – Pakistan agrees to the construction of the long-discussed gas pipeline which will transport natural gas from Iran to India via Pakistan.
- 20 March – US President Bill Clinton makes a groundbreaking visit to improve ties
- 20 March – 36 Sikh killed in Kashmir
- 4 April – 532 Assamese secessionist rebels surrender in a symbolic ceremony. Whilst Assam's chief minister hails this as a sign of failing public support for secession, the leader of the United Liberation Front of Assam denies that the "rebels" are active members of his or other organizations.
- 23 April – Under criticism for doing "too little, too late" in response to a severe drought in Rajasthan and Gujarat in the northwest, Prime Minister Vajpayee appeals to the nation for charitable donations to help the region in a televised address on many local channels.
- Late April – The state government of Bihar agrees to support proposals to create a new state – unofficially named Jharkhand – from its southern districts.
- 12 May- Miss India Lara Dutta crowned Miss Universe 2000 in Cyprus.
- 25 May – The central bank intervenes on the foreign exchange markets and announces moves to stabilize the rupee after the currency hit a record low against the U.S. dollar.
- Late May – Journalists lead national and international condemnation of a proposed law which will demand information from reporters concerning "terrorist" activities.
- 1 June – 2000 – Pen Power, an Encyclopedia of published letters to the editors from some 200 letter writers was released by M.V.Kamath, Chairperson of Prasar Bharati. The veteran journalist declares that Pen-Power should be prescribed as a text book in all Journalism colleges.
- Early June – Clashes between security forces and terrorists in Jammu and Kashmir kill 17 people. Violence in the region has become a daily occurrence as it also has in the far-eastern state of Tripura where killings of Bengalis by Christian separatist rebels have prompted the deployment of an extra 3,000 paramilitary troops by the government.
- Mid-June – Prime Minister Vajpayee approves a measure to provide 320,000 government employees with free telephones. India has only 26 phone lines per 1,000 people.
- 11 June – Rajesh Pilot, a senior member of the opposition Congress party, dies in a car crash. Hundreds of supporters mourn outside the home of the popular politician who, analysts say, was an important figure of stability within the party and a likely successor to Congress leader Sonia Gandhi.
- Mid-June – Reliance Industries, the country's biggest private company, announces plans to enter into the information technology industry. A new subsidiary, Reliance Infocomm, will oversee the laying of fibre-optic cables to connect the top 115 cities to the Internet.
- Mid-June – London-based human rights group Amnesty International criticizes India, along with Bangladesh and Pakistan, for insufficiently protecting the rights of women, who, it says, are subjected to negative bias in investigations of abuse.
- 16 June – 34 lower-caste Hindus are killed in the northeastern state of Bihar; eight suspects are arrested two days later. The massacre was believed to be a revenge killing for 12 upper-caste Hindus who were killed a week before. The banned private army Ranvir Sena was believed to have been responsible for the latest killing and for 350 other deaths since 1994.
- Mid-June – Archaeologists announce a significant discovery of treasure believed to be around 5,000 years old in the northern state of Uttar Pradesh. The jewelry was thought to belong to a civilization from the Indus Valley not previously thought to have spread so far afield.
- Late June – The government announces plans to subsidize health insurance for the "poorest of the poor".
- Late June – Eight executives from the independent television station Channel V are arrested and charged with obscenity and indecency after screening a program in which two teenage girls were encouraged to strip on the streets of Mumbai for a small cash incentive.
- 24 June – Almost 1 billion people worldwide reportedly tune in to watch the International Indian Film Awards held at the Millennium Dome in London, England. The Indian film industry, known as Bollywood, has its second-largest following in the UK, mostly amongst the country's ethnic Indian population, but receives little attention from the British press.
- 26 June – The state assembly of Jammu and Kashmir angers the federal government when it resolves to ask for a return of the region's autonomous status which was revoked in 1953. The government refuses to discuss the proposal in parliament in early July and rejects the calls outright.
- 27 June – The Supreme Court calls on the government to review its list of employees and remove "the indolent, infirm, and those of doubtful integrity, reputation, or utility".
- 28 June – India joins a select group of six countries when it commences regular summits with the European Union. The other five countries which have regular consultations with the EU are Canada, China, Japan, Russia and the U.S.
- Early July – The first passenger rail link between India and Bangladesh in 26 years was opened. The line between Benapole in Bangladesh and Petrapole in West Bengal was closed due to lack of commercial interest in 1974.
- Early July – Wildlife experts announce an investigation into the mysterious sudden deaths of 12 of the 56 rare Royal Bengal tigers in Nandankanan Zoo in Orissa. There are thought to be fewer than 4,000 tigers in the wild in India.
- Mid-July – The UN's Population Fund condemns the government for its lack of commitment to tackle the imbalance between numbers of males and females in the country which it was thought was largely due to the feticide and infanticide of baby girls. There are estimated to be 960 women to every 1,000 men.
- Mid-July – A landslide in Mumbai's slum district kills at least 60 people after torrential rain. A further 200 people are feared lost under the rubble.
- 15 July – Prime Minister Vajpayee announces that long-distance domestic phone lines will be fully deregulated from 15 August to help boost the country's information technology industry.
- 17 July – More than 50 people are killed when a Boeing 737 passenger plane crashes in a residential area of Patna.
- July – Authorities in Sikkim uphold complaints from local Buddhists and ban expeditions up the northeast face of the world's third highest mountain peak, Kanchenjunga, which was revered by local people as a deity.
- 22 July – The government announces the launch of a National Population Stabilization Fund to help promote family planning programs in the country, especially in the northern states which contain half of all Indians. The population officially passed the 1 billion mark on 11 May, although the UN believes that figure had already been reached on 15 August 1999.
- 23 July – Minister for Law Ram Jethmalani resigns from the cabinet blaming strained relations with Attorney General Soli Sorabjee.
- Late July – Bal Thackeray, leader of the far-right Shiv Sena group, was released within hours of his arrest. The court claims that too much time has passed since his alleged crimes of promoting "communal enmity" to warrant prosecution. The Maharashtra state government, whose decision to press the charges had prompted threats from Shiv Sena supporters to disrupt commerce in Mumbai, says it will appeal against the ruling.
- Late July – Thousands of police officers in the crime-plagued eastern state of Bihar go on strike to demand better compensation for the families of fallen comrades, and less "political interference" in their work.
- Late July – 10,000 homes are destroyed and 40 people killed in severe flooding in the northwestern state of Rajasthan.
- 24 July – The government's commitment to privatization plans was confirmed with the naming of ex-journalist and committed free-market economist Arun Shourie as minister for privatization.
- 24 July - Hizbul Mujahideen commander Abdul Majeed Dar announces unilateral ceasefire with Indian forces in Kashmir valley.
- 25 July - Bal Thackeray arrested for writing articles that allegedly incited Bombay riots.
- Late July – The government and separatist rebels from the far-eastern border state of Nagaland agree to extend their ceasefire for a further year in an attempt to bring a lasting solution to the 53-year rebellion.
- 27 July - Nanoor massacre by Communist Party of India (Marxist) workers in West Bengal.
- 30 July – The Indian film idol Rajkumar was part of a group taken hostage by a notorious Karnataka bandit known as Veerappan. A popular outcry places the state government under strong pressure to negotiate Rajkumar's release, but in August the Supreme Court rules out a deal involving the release of imprisoned members of Veerappan's elephant poaching and timber smuggling band. One of Rajkumar's fellow hostages manages to escape from his captors on 28 September
- 1 August – Bangaru Laxman, a junior minister in the cabinet, was appointed as the new president of the ruling BJP. Laxman was the first lower-caste Hindu and southern Indian to hold the position and says he will look to expand the party's support base in the south. As a known moderate it was thought he will also seek to mend strained relations with the Hindu right.
- Early August – Around 90 Hindus are massacred by Muslim separatists in Indian-administered Kashmir. The violence was thought to be a hostile reaction to peace initiatives begun by the largest separatist group Hizbul Mujahideen.
- Early August – Five people suspected of being witches are burned alive by 200 angry villagers in the southern state of Andhra Pradesh. Almost all of the village's 1,500 inhabitants flee their homes after the crime.
- Early August – Severe rainfall over the Himalayas causes widespread devastation across northern and eastern areas of the country. More than 100 people are killed and over 5 million made homeless in the states of Himachal Pradesh, West Bengal, and Assam.
- Early August – Thousands of women demonstrate in New Delhi in support of the government's proposed "reservations bill" which will guarantee women one-third of all parliamentary seats. Pressure groups note that despite the prime minister's promises the bill has not been listed on the current parliamentary schedule.
- 8 August – A ceasefire initiated on 24 July between the government and the Kashmiri separatist group Hizbul Mujahideen falls apart after only 15 days after accusations that the government has fired on some of the group's members. Prime Minister Vajpayee urges that his government was still prepared to discuss peace initiatives but states that any deal will have to be worked out within the framework of the Indian constitution, which Hizbul Mujahideen has flatly rejected as a basis for peace. The government also refuses to address the group's key demand that Pakistan be involved in any talks.
- Late August – The regionalist debate was invigorated by government proposals to share out the revenue of the various states. Delegates from ten states meet with the prime minister to urge him to drop the proposals. They claim the policy will penalize states which have managed to increase revenue through hard-won reforms.
- Late August – Over 100 people die in severe monsoon rains in southern India. In the face of the torrential downpour more than 50,000 people are evacuated, mostly from Hyderabad which receives over half of its average annual rainfall in 24 hours.
- 24 August – The army claims it has killed at least ten Pakistani soldiers after attacking around 40 troops attempting to penetrate Indian territory. It was the worst cross-border incident since an unofficial ceasefire was agreed in June.
- 6 September – 300,000 telecom workers begin an indefinite strike to protest against the government's decision to transform the department of telecommunications into a state-run corporation.
- Early September – The onslaught against overpopulation continues in the western state of Maharashtra when the state's government decides to withhold benefits from May 2001 for families with more than two children. A two-child maximum was already a prerequisite for employment by the state, and the authorities are also considering enforcing a law to prevent women from marrying under the age of 18.
- Mid-September – The environmentalist group Greenpeace criticizes the government for not doing enough to enforce regulations banning the dumping of international toxic waste in India.
- Mid-September – The World Health Organization (WHO) warns that 1 billion people worldwide are regularly exposed to levels of air pollution 100 times greater than recommended guidelines. The greatest risk was from the use of solid fuel in poor households, rather than from industrial smog in large cities. It notes that 500,000 children from rural areas die every year from respiratory infections in India where 80% of homes use solid fuel for cooking and heating.
- September – On average in India 24 women are raped every day and 14 killed to "protect their family's honour" according to the UN's latest State of the World's Population report. It also reveals that 40% of Indian women are subjected to domestic violence.
- Late September – India and South Africa sign a defense cooperation agreement in Cape Town covering peacekeeping, weapons development and procurement, and counter-terrorism. South Africa hopes that India's experience in peacekeeping can be applied in conflict resolution in southern Africa.
- 29 September – Newspapers hail the conviction of former prime minister P.V. Narasimha Rao as a landmark moment in Indian law. He was found guilty of corruption in a bribery scandal dating from 1993 and the decision was interpreted by the press as a clear signal that high rank does not provide legal protection.
- End of September – Flooding in eastern states has left many millions homeless and has killed 850 people in the state of West Bengal alone.
- 30 September – The Communist Party of India - Marxist (CPI-M), the third largest party at federal level, has its status as a "national" party revoked by the electoral commission. The move was a serious threat to the party which controls two states outright, including the populous state of West Bengal, and was the leading coalition partner in another.
- Early October – A senior Hindu leader urges the government to establish a national Christian church and expel foreign missionaries. The country's Christian community was often subject to violent intimidation from extremist Hindu activists.
- 3 October – Prime Minister Vajpayee signs a bilateral agreement with Russian President Vladimir Putin to increase ties between the two countries including cooperation on issues of defense.
- Mid-October – The Centre for Monitoring Indian Economy (CMIE) revises its predictions, lowering the forecast rate of economic growth for 2000 from 7% to 5.8%.
- Mid-October – The chief minister of the northeastern state of Arunachal Pradesh complains that Chinese soldiers are making regular forays across the agreed Line of Actual Control to harass villagers. The Chinese government dismisses the claims as inaccurate.
- Mid-October – A court in the western state of Gujarat rules in favour of the vertical extension of the controversial Sardar Sarovar dam on the River Narmada. Work on the dam was halted in 1994 due to strong local objections. Supporters of the project point to the beneficial effects of more water for the drought-plagued region and an increase in hydroelectric power while opponents argue that the subsequent displacement of thousands of villagers around the river was insupportable.
- 1 November – Chhattisgarh, carved out of Madhya Pradesh, becomes India's 26th state.
- 6 November – Buddhadeb Bhattacharjee was sworn in as the new chief minister of West Bengal following the retirement of Jyoti Basu, the world's longest-serving elected communist leader.
- 9 November – Uttaranchal, now known as Uttarakhand, carved out of Uttar Pradesh, becomes India's 27th state.
- Early November – Syed Salahuddin, leader of the Kashmiri separatist group Hizbul Mujahideen, calls on Muslim nations to cut ties with India and says the group will not renew a unilateral ceasefire. It calls for the Indian government to officially recognize that Jammu and Kashmir was a disputed territory and for any further negotiations to include the Pakistani government and the people of Kashmir.
- Mid-November – Three months of extreme embarrassment for the state governments of Tamil Nadu and Karnataka end when the notorious aging bandit Veerappan suddenly releases an even older veteran actor, Rajkumar, he had held captive since August. The authorities, keenly aware of the popularity of Rajkumar, agreed in August to grant some of Veerappan's demands which included the official recognition of Tamil as a language used in business in Karnataka, and the release of prisoners held under strict anti-terrorist laws. It remains unclear what exactly prompted the release of Rajkumar.
- 15 November – Sonia Gandhi easily wins reelection as leader of the Congress (I) party, beating Jitendra Prasada by 7,448 votes to 94. Prasada was the first person to challenge a member of the Nehru-Gandhi dynasty which has dominated Congress since the 1950s.
- 15 November – Jharkhand, carved out of Bihar, becomes India's 28th state.
- Late November – Violent protests force the government to rethink plans to close heavily polluting industries in Delhi. Workers from the doomed factories clash with police while demonstrating against the environmentally motivated decision which would lead to job losses.
- Late November – Ten people, including three Indian soldiers, are killed in a landmine attack in Kashmir on the first day of a government ceasefire held to coincide with the Muslim holy month of Ramadan. The terrorist group Hizbul Mujahideen claim responsibility for the attack condemning the ceasefire as a publicity stunt intended to win over international opinion.
- Late November – India's central vigilance commissioner N. Vittal declares that the country's entire political system depends on illegal funding.
- 1 December – Miss India first runner-up Priyanka Chopra wins the Miss World 2000 title.
- 2 December – Pakistan offers to exercise "maximum restraint" in contested border areas of Kashmir as a beginning to negotiations with the Indian authorities. India insists that before there can be talks there must be a complete cessation of firing across the Line of Control.
- Early December – Political turmoil was ignited by the anniversary of the destruction of a mosque by Hindu extremists at Ayodhya, Uttar Pradesh, in 1992. It leads to calls for the resignation of Prime Minister Vajpayee and leaves the lower house of parliament, the Lok Sabha, in stalemate. Vajpayee suggests that the construction of a Hindu temple on the site of the mosque, reputedly the birthplace of a Hindu deity, was "an expression of national yearning".
- 17 December – An alliance of Kashmiri separatists, the Hurriyat, begin talks to discuss a unified response to the Indian government's ceasefire but divisions between the factions drag the conference into a second day.
- 20 December – In response to the Indian government's extension of its unilateral ceasefire in Kashmir for a further month, the Pakistani authorities announce that they will partially withdraw troops from the disputed line of control.
- Late December – Relations with Pakistan are damaged when Prime Minister Vajpayee accuses the Pakistani authorities of being behind threats made by the extremist Kashmiri separatist group Lashkar-e-Toiba against his own person. The group, which was based in Pakistan, launched a surprise attack on the historic Red Fort in Delhi on 22 December, killing three people and undermining Vajpayee's Ramadan ceasefire, which had been extended for an extra month two days earlier.

== Law ==
- Mid-October – The Information Technology Act 2000 comes into force providing regulations for e-commerce and punishment for improper use of the Internet. Digital signatures are now legal, and distributors of cyber pornography can face up to five years imprisonment. The act includes a controversial clause allowing police to make searches and arrest suspects in public places without a warrant.

== Births ==
- 21 January – Naga Vaishnavi, murder victim (died 2010)
- 25 February - Ivana (actress), actress.
- 5 April –
  - Ayush Mahesh Khedekar, actor
  - Mugdha Vaishampayan, singer
- 25 May - Sivaangi Krishnakumar, actress, playback singer and television personality.
- 11 October – Sparsh Khanchandani, actress
- Afreen Hyder – Indian taekwondo practitioner.

== Deaths ==
- 31 January - K. N. Singh, actor (b. 1908)
- 27 March – Priya Rajvansh, film actress (b. 1937)
- 6 May – Balivada Kantha Rao, novelist and playwright (b. 1927).
- 22 May – Bahadoor, actor (b. 1930).
- 10 July – Vakkom Majeed, freedom fighter and politician (b. 1909).
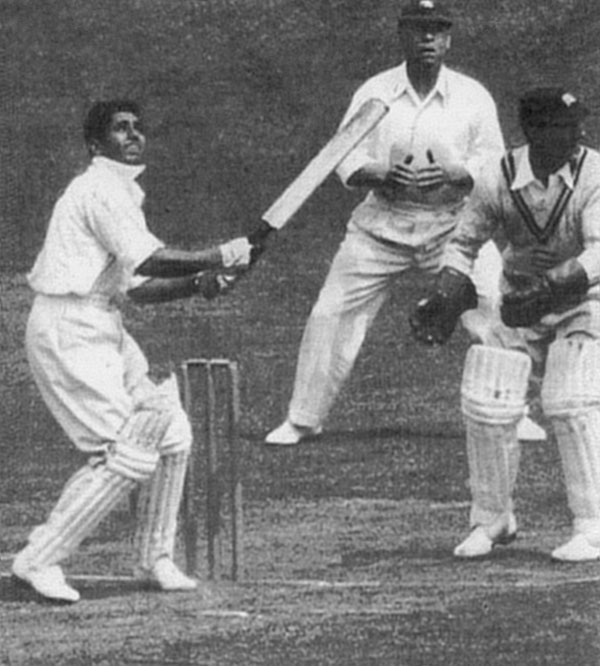
- Lala Amarnath
  5 August – Lala Amarnath, cricketer (b. 1911).
- 26 August – Balan K. Nair, actor (b. 1933).
- 7 November – Chidambaram Subramaniam, politician and Minister (b. 1910).

== See also ==
- List of Bollywood films of 2000
