= 1999 in India =

- Centuries: 18th; 19th; 20th; 21st
- Decades: 1970s; 1980s; 1990s; 2000s; 2010s
- See also: List of years in India; Timeline of Indian history

1999 in the Republic of India.

== Incumbents ==
- President of India – K. R. Narayanan
- Prime Minister of India – Atal Bihari Vajpayee
- Vice President of India – Krishna Kant
- Chief Justice of India – Adarsh Sein Anand

=== Governors ===
- Andhra Pradesh – C. Rangarajan
- Arunachal Pradesh – Mata Prasad (until 16 May), S. K. Sinha (16 May–1 August), Arvind Dave (starting 1 August)
- Assam – Srinivas Kumar Sinha
- Bihar –
  - until 15 March: Sunder Singh Bhandari
  - 15 March-5 October: B.M. Lal
  - 6 October-22 November: Suraj Bhan
  - starting 22 November: V. C. Pande
- Goa – J. F. R. Jacob (until 22 November), Mohammed Fazal (starting 22 November)
- Gujarat –
  - until 16 January: Anshuman Singh
  - 16 January-18 March: K.G. Balakrishnan
  - starting 18 March: Sunder Singh Bhandari
- Haryana – Mahabir Prasad
- Himachal Pradesh – V. S. Ramadevi (until 1 December), Vishnu Kant Shastri (starting 1 December)
- Jammu and Kashmir – Girish Chandra Saxena
- Karnataka – Khurshed Alam Khan (until 2 December), V. S. Ramadevi (starting 2 December)
- Kerala – Sukhdev Singh Kang
- Madhya Pradesh – Bhai Mahavir
- Maharashtra – P.C. Alexander
- Manipur – O.N. Shrivastava (until 11 February), Ved Marwah (starting 11 February)
- Meghalaya – M.M. Jacob
- Mizoram – A. Padmanabhan
- Nagaland – Om Prakash Sharma
- Odisha – C. Rangarajan (until 14 November), M. M. Rajendran (starting 15 November)
- Punjab – Bakshi Krishan Nath Chhibber (until 27 November), J. F. R. Jacob (starting 27 November)
- Rajasthan – Navrang Lal Tibrewal (until 16 January), Anshuman Singh (starting 16 January)
- Sikkim – Chaudhary Randhir Singh
- Tamil Nadu – M. Fathima Beevi
- Tripura – Siddheswar Prasad
- Uttar Pradesh – Suraj Bhan
- West Bengal –
  - until 18 May: Akhlaqur Rahman Kidwai
  - 18 May-4 December: Shyamal Kumar Sen
  - starting 4 December: Viren J. Shah

== Events ==
- National income - ₹19,882,616 million

=== January - April ===
- 9 January - Anjana Mishra rape case in Odisha.
- 23 January - Australian Christian missionary Graham Staines and his two sons were burned to death by Bajrang Dal activists in Kendujhar district, Odisha.
- 30 January – Maharashtra Chief Minister Manohar Joshi resigns on orders from Bal Thackeray, the boss of the right-wing Hindu Shiv Sena party. It is speculated that Joshi may have been fired for failing to prevent the arrest of party activists who trashed a cricket board office in protest against the India-Pakistan series. Thackeray had launched a violent campaign to prevent the series, saying the two neighbours should not hold sports events while they continue to fight over the border state of Kashmir.
- 31 January – India and the United States end three days of talks on nuclear non-proliferation issues, declaring the meeting "productive" and promising to resume discussions before the middle of the year.
- 7 February - Anil Kumble became the second bowler in the history of Test cricket to take all ten wickets in an innings of a match. This remarkable feat was achieved in a Test match against Pakistan Cricket Team at Feroze Shah Kotla Stadium.
- 12 February – The chief minister of Orissa, Janaki Ballabh Patnaik, resigns after pressure within and outside his Congress Party over recent mob attacks on Christians in the state. On 15 February Giridhar Gomango is named to succeed him.
- 12 February – Prime Minister Atal Bihari Vajpayee sacks the government of Bihar, which is run by an opposition party, and imposes federal rule.
- 19 February – Vajpayee makes a goodwill visit to Pakistan on the maiden trip of a cross-border bus service between Delhi and Lahore.
- 23 February – At the end of a ground-breaking visit to Pakistan by Prime Minister Vajpayee, the two countries agree to work harder on their Kashmir dispute and announce steps to defuse tension and reduce risk of nuclear war.
- 27 February – Finance Minister Yashwant Sinha unveils a budget which promises to kickstart the infrastructure sector and boost stock markets.
- 8 March – The government reverses its decision on federal rule in Bihar to avert humiliation in a vote on the issue in the upper house.
- 29 March – The 6.8 M_{w} Chamoli earthquake shook northern India with a maximum Mercalli intensity of VIII (Severe), killing 103.
- 3 April – The All India Anna Dravida Munnetra Kazhagam (AIADMK) backs an opposition demand for a parliamentary inquiry into the sacking of the naval chief.
- 5 April – The cabinet rejects an AIADMK demand for the dismissal of Defense Minister George Fernandes and the reinstatement of the navy chief. It says it is ready for a trial of strength in parliament.
- 6 April – The AIADMK withdraws two of its representatives from the Council of Ministers.
- 11 April – India says it has successfully test-fired a longer-range model of its Agni ballistic missile.
- 13 April – Tercentenary celebrations of the creation of the Sikh, Khalsa.
- 14 April – The AIADMK withdraws support from the ruling coalition. President K.R. Narayanan asks the government to seek a confidence vote in parliament.
- 17 April – India's 13-month-old BJP-led Second Vajpayee government falls after losing a no confidence motion in the Lok Sabha by just one vote.
- 26 April – The Lok Sabha is dissolved and early elections are called.
- 28 April – At least 39 people die when a train rams a crowded bus in the state of Uttar Pradesh.

=== May - August ===
- 11 May – India's Supreme Court confirms death sentences for four of the 26 people convicted of conspiring to assassinate former prime minister Rajiv Gandhi in May 1991.
- 17 May – Sonia Gandhi resigns as head of India's main opposition Congress party after criticism from three senior colleagues. Congress expels the three for six years on 20 May. She withdraws the decision on 24 May.
- 26 May – India unleashes two waves of air strikes to flush out guerrillas on its side of a Kashmir ceasefire line, sharply raising temperatures in the region. The next day India confirms it has lost two fighter jets which Pakistan says they shot down.
- 28 May – In Kashmir, a stinger missile brings down an Indian helicopter killing all on board
- 7 June – India says it has forced guerrilla infiltrators in Kashmir back towards the ceasefire line with Pakistan, and killed 221 Pakistani soldiers in the offensive.
- 10 June - TANSI land acquisition case
- 12 June – India and Pakistan hold "businesslike" talks over their Kashmir dispute but fail to resolve it; India says Pakistan tried to infiltrate the Turtuk Sector and puts the death toll at 267 Pakistanis and 86 Indians
- 4 July – India says it has recaptured the strategic Tiger Hill on its side of a military line of control in Kashmir.
- 4 July - Leander Paes and Mahesh Bhupathi became the first Indian pair to win doubles title in Wimbledon Championship.
- 9 July – In Kashmir, the Indian army reports that it has all but ousted the infiltrators from the Batalik zone on India's side of the ceasefire line.
- 11 July – India recaptures Kargil, forcing the Pakistan Army to retreat. India announces victory ending the two-month conflict.
- Mufti Mohammad Sayeed launches the People's Democratic Party in Jammu and Kashmir.
- 17 July – India signals the end of the flare-up with Pakistan by announcing that all infiltrators have withdrawn from Indian-held Kashmir.
- 26 July – India says its troops have cleared all infiltrators from their side of the Line of Control that divides Kashmir
- 2 August – Two crowded trains collide head-on at a railway station in Gaisal, Eastern India, killing 286 people.
- 10 August – The Atlantique incident occurs as an intruding Pakistan Navy plane is shot down in the contested area the Rann of Kachchh dispute. The incident sparks tensions between the 2 nations, coming just a month after the end of the Kargil War.
- 15 August – India says Pakistan's aid to guerrillas in Kashmir is hindering peace talks between them.

=== September - December ===
- 4 September – Indian forces rescue five of the six men held hostage by terrorists in Jammu and Kashmir; the other hostage was killed by the terrorists.
- 4 September, 11, 18, 25, and 3 October – Parliamentary elections are held, in which the National Democratic Alliance led by Prime Minister Vajpayee's BJP wins 298 seats, the Congress-led Alliance 134, and others 105.
- 6 October – A pro-independence Kashmiri group abandons plans to march into the Indian-ruled part of the Kashmir region.
- 8 October – India's Supreme Court turns down an appeal by four co-conspirators sentenced to die in the assassination of former prime minister Rajiv Gandhi.
- 13 October - Third Vajpayee ministry sworn into power.
- 29 October – The Odisha cyclone slams into the state of Orissa packing winds of 240 km/h and flattening houses across a wide area along the Bay of Bengal.
- 7 November – Forty-two people die in the northern town of Sonepat after a fire in a market selling firecrackers.
- 11 November – A bomb explodes in the Delhi-bound Puja Express from Jammu at Kandrori station, killing 13 and injuring 50.
- 30 November – India says the death toll in cyclone-hit Orissa State is at least 9,885.
- 24 December – Heavily armed hijackers take over an Indian Airlines Airbus carrying 189 people from Kathmandu (Nepal) to New Delhi. After a detour to the United Arab Emirates, it lands at Kandahar, Afghanistan, on 25 December. On 28 December the hijackers make three demands, including the release of 35 terrorists and a sum of $200 million. On 31 December the hijackers, who stabbed a man on the plane to death, free their hostages after reaching agreement with India for the release of three terrorists in Kashmir.
- 27 December - A militant organisation named Al-Badr attacks interrogation center Cargo in Srinagar and kills 13 security personnel.

== Births ==
- 21 January – Rubina Ali, actress
- 16 March – Ivana Maria Furtado, chess prodigy
- 23 March – Armaan Verma, actor
- 1 May – Murali Karthikeyan, chess player
- 22 May – Kumar Padmanabh Singh, distinguished polo player, internet personality
- 28 August – Jeetumoni Kalita, contemporary dancer
- 8 September – Shubman Gill, cricketer.
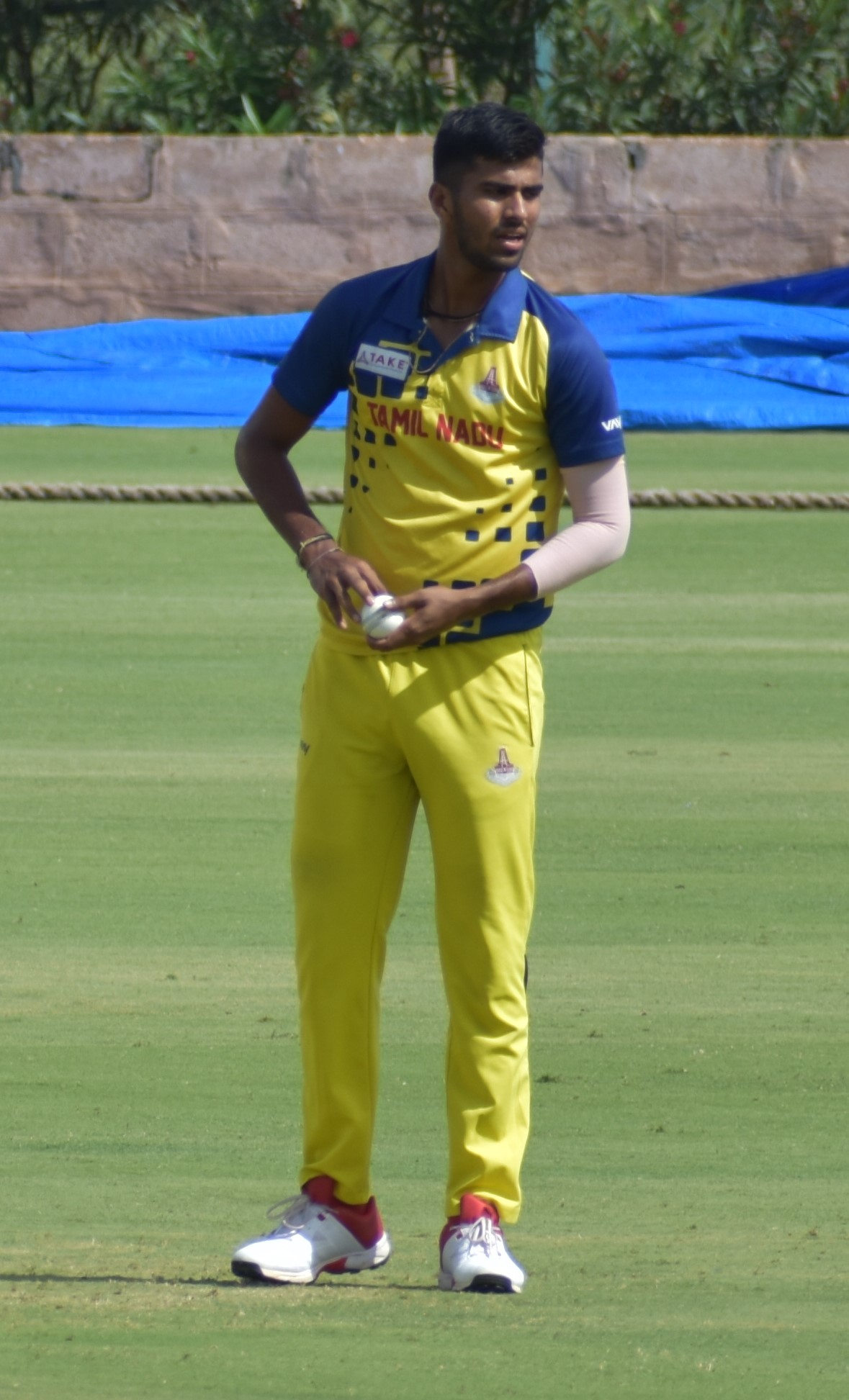
- Washington Sundar
  5 October – Washington Sundar, cricketer
- 30 October – Ali Haji, actor
- 9 November – Prithvi Shaw, cricketer
- 11 November – Navpreet Singh
- 22 November – Umran Malik, cricketer

=== Full date unknown ===
- Shah Hetul, chess player
- Sreekala Sasidharan, actress

== Deaths ==
- 10 April - Thakazhi Sivasankara Pillai, Jnanpith Award winning Malayalam writer. (b.1912).
- 11 June – C. R. Kesavan Vaidyar, social activist and industrialist (b. 1904).
- 12 July – Rajendra Kumar, actor and producer (b. 1927).
- 10 August – Baldev Upadhyaya, Sanskrit scholar, literary historian, essayist and critic (b. 1899).
- 26 December – Shankar Dayal Sharma, former president of India and Chief Minister of Bhopal (present day Madhya Pradesh) (b. 1918).

=== Full date unknown ===
- Rappal Sangameswaraier Krishnan, scientist and researcher (b. 1911).

== See also ==
- Bollywood films of 1999
