= Shiva Swaroop =

Indian police officer

Lieutenant Governor of Arunachal Pradesh
- In office 21 November 1985 – 20 February 1987
- Preceded by: Thanjavelu Rajeshwar
- Succeeded by: Bhishma Narain Singh

Shiva Swaroop was an Indian Police Officer. He served as the Director General of Central Reserve Police Force in Nagaland from 1975 to 1981. Later, he was the Lieutenant Governor of Arunachal Pradesh from November 1985 to February 1987.
