= K. Sankaranarayanan =

Former Governor of Maharashtra (1932–2022)

His Excellency K Sankaranarayanan
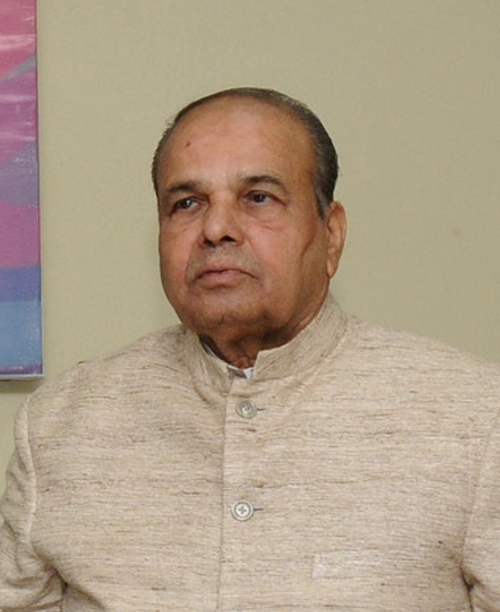
- Sankaranarayanan in 2013

20th Governor of Maharashtra
- In office 22 January 2010 – 24 August 2014
- Chief Minister: Ashok Chavan; Prithviraj Chavan
- Preceded by: S C Jamir
- Succeeded by: Om Prakash Kohli (additional charge)

5th Governor of Jharkhand
- In office 26 July 2009 – 21 January 2010
- Chief Minister: Shibu Soren
- Preceded by: Syed Sibtey Razi
- Succeeded by: M. O. H. Farook

13th Governor of Nagaland
- In office 3 February 2007 – 28 July 2009
- Chief Minister: Neiphiu Rio
- Preceded by: Shyamal Datta
- Succeeded by: Gurbachan Jagat

Governor of Assam
- (Additional Charge)
- In office 26 June 2009 – 27 July 2009
- Chief Minister: Tarun Gogoi
- Preceded by: Shiv Charan Mathur
- Succeeded by: Syed Sibtey Razi

Governor of Arunachal Pradesh
- (Additional Charge)
- In office 4 September 2007 – 26 January 2008
- Chief Minister: Dorjee Khandu
- Preceded by: S. K. Singh
- Succeeded by: Joginder Jaswant Singh
- In office 7 April 2007 – 14 April 2007
- Chief Minister: Gegong Apang; Dorjee Khandu
- Preceded by: M. M. Jacob
- Succeeded by: S. K. Singh

Governor of Goa
- (Additional Charge)
- In office 8 September 2011 – 3 May 2012
- Chief Minister: Digambar Kamat
- Preceded by: Shivinder Singh Sidhu
- Succeeded by: B. V. Wanchoo

Personal details
- Born: 15 October 1932 Palakkad, Madras Presidency, British India
- Died: 24 April 2022 (aged 89) Sekharipuram, Kerala, India
- Party: Indian National Congress
- Spouse: Prof K Radha
- Children: 1 daughter

Kateekal Sankaranarayanan (15 October 1932 – 24 April 2022) was an Indian politician who served as the governor of Maharashtra from 22 January 2010 to 24 August 2014. He had also served as the governor of Nagaland and Jharkhand. Prior to his appointment as governor, he had served as a minister in several Congress led governments of Kerala headed by Chief Ministers A K Antony and K. Karunakaran. On 24 August 2014, he was transferred by the NDA government to Mizoram.

Sankaranarayanan was also asked to assume the additional charge of Arunachal Pradesh during the absence on leave of S K Singh. The swear-in ceremony was held on 7 April 2007. When Singh was appointed Governor of Rajasthan on 19 August 2007, Sankaranarayanan was also appointed Governor of Arunachal Pradesh, and he was sworn in on 4 September 2007. He remained in that post until January 2008, when Joginder Jaswant Singh became governor of Arunachal Pradesh. On 22 January 2010, he was sworn in as the Governor of Maharashtra. On 27 August 2011, he was given additional charge of Goa until the Indian government appointed B V Wanchoo to the post on 4 May 2012.

== Early life and career ==
Sankaranarayanan, veteran Congress leader, was born on 15 October 1932 in the city of Palakkad in the state of Kerala as the son of A Sankaran Nair and Smt K Lekshmi Amma.

He entered politics while a student and had been an active member of the Students Organisation since 1946. Sankaranarayanan became elected to 5th KLA from Thrithala, 6th KLA from Sreekrishnapuram, 8th KLA from Ottappalam, and later, also to the 11th KLA, from Palghat constituency as an Indian National Congress member.

From 11 April 1977 to 25 April 1977 he handled the portfolios of Agriculture, Animal Husbandry and Dairy Development, and Community Development, in the Ministry headed by K Karunakaran. From 27 April 1977 to 27 October 1978, he handled the same portfolios in the Ministry headed by A K Antony. Again from 26 May 2001 to 29 August 2004, he was the Minister for Finance in the Ministry headed by A K Antony. He held the portfolios of Excise as well, until 10 February 2004. From 1989 to 1991 he served also as the chairman of the committee on Public Accounts and from 1980 to 1982 he was the chairman of the committee on Government Assurances. And from 1985 to 2001, he was the Convenor of the UDF. Along with that, he held various positions in the party as secretary, District Congress Committee, president, KPCC (O), general secretary, KPCC, member, All India Working Committee, and member, Parliamentary Board Congress (O).

Election	Constituency	Result	Majority
1965	Ottappalam	Lost	8242
1967	Palakkad	Lost	9631
1977	Thrithala	Won	9724
1980	Sreekrishnapuram	Won	418
1982	Sreekrishnapuram	Lost	10522
1987	Ottappalam	Won	1710
1991	Ottappalam	Lost	4270
2001	Palakkad	Won	10805

== Death ==
Sankaranarayanan died on 24 April 2022 at his home in Sekharipuram, India from complications of a stroke, aged 89. He was cremated with full state honours at the premises of his ancestral home in Painkulam, Thrissur district.

Government offices
Preceded by S.K. Singh	Governor of Arunachal Pradesh; 2007–2008	Succeeded by Joginder Jaswant Singh
Preceded by Shiv Charan Mathur	Governor of Assam; 2009	Succeeded by Syed Sibtey Razi
Preceded by S C Jamir	Governor of Maharashtra; 2010–2014	Succeeded by Vidyasagar Rao
