= Nalin Kohli =

Indian politician

Spokesperson for the BJP

Personal details
- Party: Bharatiya Janata Party
- Occupation: Politician, advocate

Nalin Kohli is an Indian politician and an advocate at the Supreme Court of India. He is a member of and one of the official spokespersons for the Bharatiya Janata Party (BJP). He has also been Convenor of the BJP's National Media Cell.

Kohli is also a former prime-time news anchor on Doordarshan, the national television channel of India. His father, Amolak Rattan Kohli, was governor of Mizoram from 2001 to 2006.
