= Lok Bhavan, Itanagar =

Residence of the Governor of Arunachal Pradesh

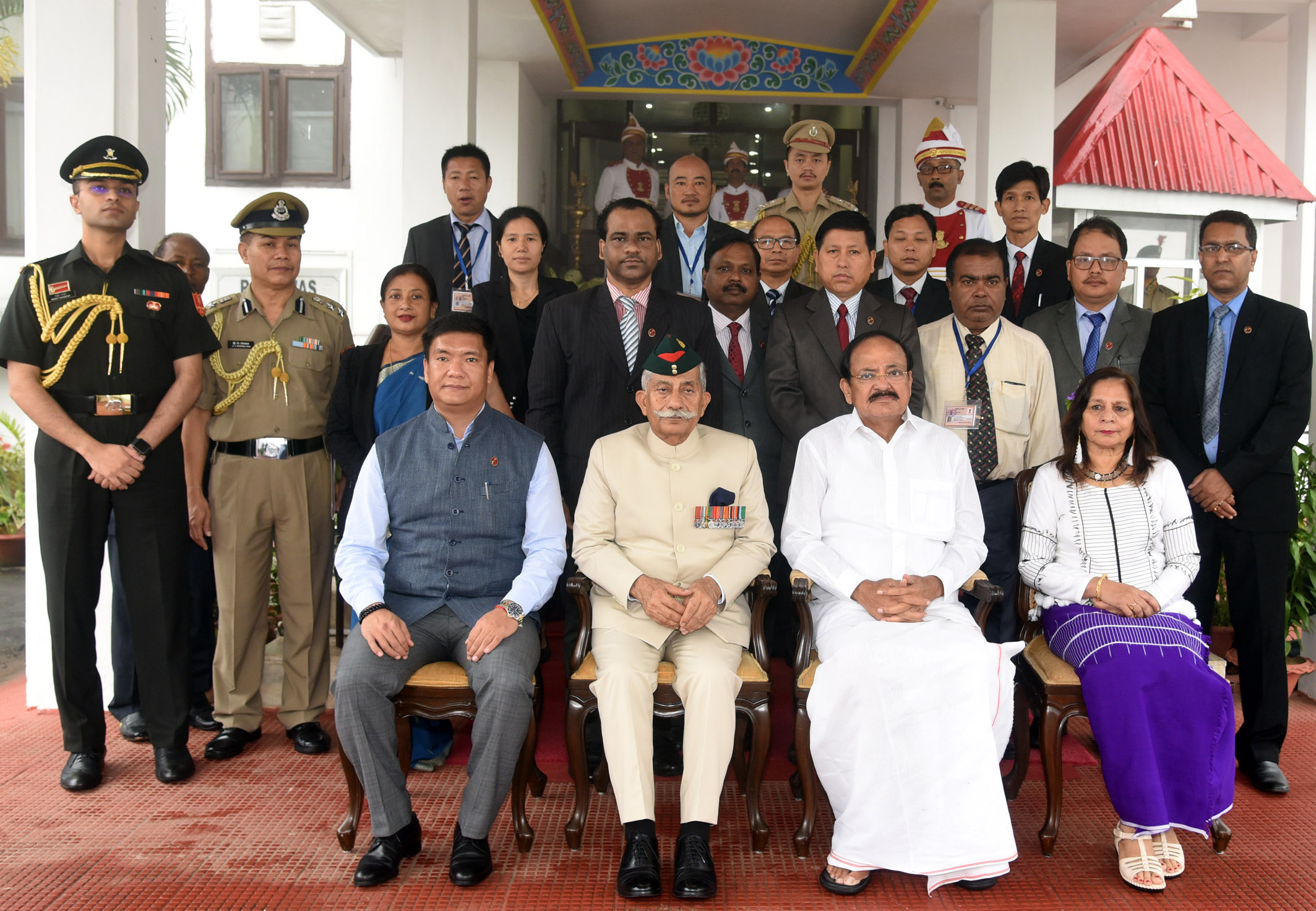
- The Vice President, Shri M. Venkaiah Naidu with the Staff of Rajbhavan, in Itanagar, Arunachal Pradesh
- Interactive map of the Lok Bhavan, Itanagar area

General information
- Coordinates: 27°5′52″N 93°38′19″E
- Current tenants: Kaiwalya Trivikram Parnaik
- Construction started: 1977
- Owner: Government of Arunachal Pradesh

References
- Official Website

Lok Bhavan formerly Raj Bhavan (translation: Government House) is the official residence of the governor of Arunachal Pradesh. It is located in the capital city of Itanagar, Arunachal Pradesh. The present governor of Arunachal Pradesh is Kaiwalya Trivikram Parnaik.

== History ==
The foundation of Raj Bhavan was laid by Late Shri K. A. A. Raja the then Lt. Governor of the Union Territory of Arunachal Pradesh on 17 April 1977.

== Building Details ==
It is located on a hillock close to a historical monument known as "Ita-Fort" (Eastern Gate). The area of the compound is approximately 27 acres (110,000 m^{2}) consisting of lawn and garden as well as kitchen garden and fruit trees.

The main building comprises Governor's suite with attached dining and study rooms, three guest rooms namely "Tirap" "Lohit" and "Siang" on 1st floor and 2 guest rooms namely "Kameng" and "Subansiri" on the ground floor. Apart from these there are three annexe rooms "Tawang", "Dirang" and "Changlang" for the guests.

Office room of Governor, ADC's room and room of PS are on the ground floor. There is one library room and meeting halls namely Gandhi Hall, Siddharth Hall on the ground floor and Gayatri Hall on the 1st floor.

There are two kitchens – the private kitchen of H.E. is on the 1st floor. The kitchen at ground floor is meant for guests and occasional parties.

The Raj Bhavan has a Billiard room, a lawn tennis court, a badminton court; also a nine-hole golf course which could do with some revival. There is also a Helipad attached to the Raj Bhavan.

The house consists of main 2-storeyed building, Secretariat building and Durbar Hall. The VIP Guest house is under construction by State PWD.

== See also ==
- Government Houses of the British Indian Empire
