= Adi M. Sethna =

Indian Army General

Lieutenant General Adi Meherji Sethna PVSM, AVSM
- Died: 17 October 2006
- Education: The Doon School; Allahabad University
- Military career
- Allegiance: India
- Branch: Indian Army
- Rank: Lieutenant General
- Unit: Rajputana Rifles
- Awards: Padma Bhushan; Param Vishisht Seva Medal; Ati Vishisht Seva Medal

Lieutenant General Adi Meherji Sethna, PVSM, AVSM was an Indian Army General who served as the Vice Chief of Army Staff.

After graduating from The Doon School and Allahabad University he was commissioned into the Indian Army and posted to the 6th Rajputana Rifles on 21 May 1944. He began his military career fighting in Malaya during the Second World War.

He was one of the few Indians to attend both the Royal College of Defence Studies and the Camberly Staff College in England. He was ADC to the second Governor-General of India C. Rajagopalachari as well as Dr. Rajendra Prasad

He also played an active role in the strategy for the Bangladesh campaign and was awarded India's third highest civilian award, the Padma Bhushan. He guided the Delhi Parsi Anjuman and the Federation of Zoroastrian Anjumans for 20 years. Adi Sethna was also the Founder President of the UNESCO Parsi-Zoroastrian Project (PARZOR). He died of cancer in 2006.

Military offices
Preceded by S P Malhotra	Commandant of the Defence Services Staff College; 1975 - 1978	Succeeded by Mohinder Singh
Preceded by Jaswant Singh	Vice Chief of Army Staff; 7 July 1980 – 31 December 1982	Succeeded by S K Sinha
