= Afreen Hyder =

Indian taekwondo player (born 2000)

Personal information
- Nationality: Indian
- Born: 2000 (age 25–26) Srinagar, Kashmir
- Years active: 2007–present

Sport
- Country: India
- Sport: Taekwondo
- Rank: 173rd
- Updated on 16 November 2023

Afreen Hyder (born 2000) is an Indian taekwondo practitioner from Srinagar, Kashmir, India. Hyder has been an All India Rank 1 holder and has previously been ranked among the top 100 female Taekwondo athletes in the world. As of 30 December 2023, she is ranked 200th in the senior division women's 62 kg World Kyorugi rankings. Hyder is the first female taekwondo athlete from Kashmir.

== Early life and education ==
Hyder was born in Srinagar in 2000. She completed her schooling at Delhi Public School (DPS) in Srinagar and has started pursuing a Bachelor of Arts in Delhi.

== Career ==
Hyder represents Jammu & Kashmir in national and international competitions and was the first taekwondo sportswoman to do so at the time. She won her first ever medal at the national level in 2010.

Hyder won a silver medal at the 2022 Senior National Taekwondo Championship, which took place in Maharashtra from the 10th to 12 February 2022.

She won a bronze medal at the 2023 Senior National Taekwondo Championship.

She won a silver medal after losing the final match of the women's under-67 kg category in the 2023 Goa National Games.
