= Mrinalini Sinha =

Professor of history

Mrinalini Sinha is a historian of modern South Asia and the British Empire. She is the Alice Freeman Palmer Professor of History at the University of Michigan, where she is also affiliated with the departments of English Language and Literature and Women's and Gender Studies. Her research focuses on colonial India, the British Empire, nationalism, gender, and transnational approaches to South Asian history.

== Education ==
Sinha received a B.A. in English from Lady Shri Ram College, University of Delhi, in 1980. She earned an M.A. from the School of International Studies at Jawaharlal Nehru University in 1982 and a second M.A. from the State University of New York at Stony Brook in 1983. She received her Ph.D. in history from Stony Brook in 1988.

== Academic career ==
Sinha held academic positions at Albion College, Pennsylvania State University, Southern Illinois University and Boston College. At Pennsylvania State University, she served as professor of history and women's studies and later as a Liberal Arts Research Professor. In 2010, she joined the University of Michigan as the Alice Freeman Palmer Professor of History. Her fellowships include awards from the Rockefeller Foundation, the National Endowment for the Humanities, the American Institute of Indian Studies and the John Simon Guggenheim Memorial Foundation.

From 2020 to 2022, Sinha served as director of the Eisenberg Institute for Historical Studies at the University of Michigan. She was president of the Association for Asian Studies in 2014–15 and has served on the council of the American Historical Association and the executive board of the Society for Advancing the History of South Asia.

== Research ==
Sinha's research focuses on the political and intellectual history of colonial India, with particular attention to gender, nationalism, and imperialism. She has developed the concept of an “imperial social formation” as a framework to explore the relationship between British and Indian histories. Her first book, Colonial Masculinity: The "Manly Englishman" and the "Effeminate Bengali" in the Late Nineteenth Century (1995), focused on the construction of British and Indian masculinities in colonial Bengal. The book analyzed political controversies including the Ilbert Bill, the Native Volunteer movement, the Public Service Commission, and the Age of Consent Bill, arguing that ideas of British and Indian masculinity developed in relation to one another within the colonial social and political order.

Her second mongraph, Specters of Mother India: The Global Restructuring of an Empire (2006), integrate the international controversy surrounding Katherine Mayo's 1927 book Mother India. Sinha examined the controversy in the context of changes in the British Empire after the First World War, focusing on Indian women's political activism, colonial policy and debates over political representation and social reform. Her account traced these developments through the passage of the Child Marriage Restraint Act in 1929.

Specters of Mother India received the 2007 Albion Book Prize from the North American Conference on British Studies and the Joan Kelly Memorial Prize in Women's History from the American Historical Association.

Her edited works include Feminisms and Internationalism (1999), Selections from Katherine Mayo's "Mother India" (1999), and Political Imaginaries in Twentieth Century India (2022). She has also edited Gender and Nation (2006) for the American Historical Association.

Her project Complete Political Independence: The Curious Genealogy of a Nationalist Indian Demand investigates the transformation of Indian claims to rights as British subjects into demands for political rights within an Indian nation-state. She has also worked on the political thought of Mahatma Gandhi and is co-editor of a two-volume Cambridge History of the Modern Indian Subcontinent.

== Editorial works ==
Sinha co-edited History of the Present from 2010 to 2022 and has served in editorial and advisory roles for academic journals, including American Historical Review, Past and Present, Gender and History, Journal of Imperial and Commonwealth History and Indian Economic and Social History Review. She also co-edits the Cambridge University Press book series Critical Perspectives on Empire and the Bloomsbury series Critical Perspectives in South Asian History.

== Selected publications ==
=== Books ===
- Sinha, Mrinalini (2017-03-01). Colonial masculinity. Manchester University Press. doi:10.7765/9781526123640. ISBN 978-1-5261-2364-0.
- Selections from Katherine Mayo's "Mother India: 9798888305065.
- Sinha, Mrinalini (2006). Specters of Mother India. Duke University Press. doi:10.1215/9780822387978. ISBN 978-0-8223-3782-9.
- Goswami, Manu; Sinha, Mrinalini (2022), "Political Imaginaries: A Program for Twentieth-Century Political History", Political Imaginaries in Twentieth-Century India, Bloomsbury Academic, doi:10.5040/9781350247857.ch-1, ISBN 978-1-350-23977-7
- Sinha, Mrinalini (2006). Gender and Nation. American Historical Association. ISBN 978-0-87229-143-0.

=== Chapters and articles ===
- Sinha, Mrinalini (2015). "Premonitions of the Past". The Journal of Asian Studies. 74 (4): 821–841. doi:10.1017/s0021911815001552. ISSN 0021-9118.
- Sinha, Mrinalini (2014), "Totaram Sanadhya's Fiji Mein Mere Ekkis Varsh", Ten Books That Shaped the British Empire, Duke University Press, pp. 168–189, doi:10.1215/9780822375920-009, ISBN 978-0-8223-5813-8
- Sinha, Mrinalini (2016-05-16), "Whatever happened to the Third British empire?", Writing imperial histories, Manchester University Press, doi:10.7765/9781526112552.00014, ISBN 978-1-5261-1255-2
- sinha, mrinalini (2012), "A Global Perspective on Gender", South Asian Feminisms, Duke University Press, pp. 356–373, doi:10.1215/9780822394990-016, ISBN 978-0-8223-5165-8
- Sinha, Mrinalini (2011-07-20). "Historically Speaking: Gender and Citizenship in Colonial India". The Question of Gender: Joan W. Scott's Critical Feminism. Indiana University Press. ISBN 978-0-253-22324-1.
- Sinha, Mrinalini (2021-09-21), ""The Strange Death of an Imperial Ideal: The case of Civis Britannicus", Modern Makeovers: Handbook of Modernity in South Asia, London: Oxford, pp. 3–17
- Sinha, Mrinalini, "Gendered Nationalism", Routledge Handbook of Gender in South Asia, Routledge, doi:10.4324/9781315848501.ch1, ISBN 978-1-315-84850-1
- Mrinalini, Sinha (2022). "Afterword: The Discipline of the Conjuncture". The People of India: New Indian Politics in the 21st Century. Random House. ISBN 978-0-670-09605-3.
