= 2006 West Bengal train explosion =

Explosion on passenger train, West Bengal

Coordinates: 22.569°N 88.369°E

2006 West Bengal train disaster
- Location: West Bengal, India
- Date: 20 November 2006; 6:10 – 6:10 (GMT)
- Target: train
- Attack type: bomb
- Deaths: 5
- Injuries: between 25 and 66
- Perpetrator: unknown

The 2006 West Bengal train disaster was a fatal suspected terrorist explosion on a train traveling between New Jalpaiguri and Haldibari on 20 November 2006, while the train was in a remote part of West Bengal, India. Five people were killed, and between 25 and 50 were injured, although home secretary Prasad Ranjan Ray stated that officials believed as many as 66 people may have been injured. Two passenger cars sustained damage. The cause of the explosion remains undetermined, but terrorism was suspected. The train was about 550 kilometres (340 mi) from Kolkata.
