= Shivinder Singh Sidhu =

Indian politician

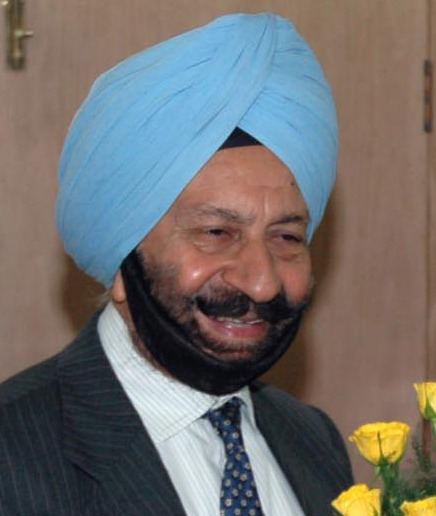

Governor of Goa
- In office 21 July 2008 – 7 September 2011
- Chief Minister: Digambar Kamat
- Preceded by: S. C. Jamir
- Succeeded by: K. Sankaranarayanan

Governor of Meghalaya
- Additional charge
- In office 29 October 2007 – 30 June 2008
- Preceded by: Banwari Lal Joshi
- Succeeded by: Ranjit Shekhar Mooshahary

Governor of Manipur
- In office 6 August 2004 – 22 July 2008
- Preceded by: Arvind Dave
- Succeeded by: Gurbachan Jagat

Secretary-General, International Civil Aviation Organization
- In office 1988–1991
- Preceded by: Yves Lambert
- Succeeded by: Philippe Rochat

Personal details
- Born: 13 October 1929
- Died: 25 October 2018 (aged 89) New Delhi, India

Shivinder Singh Sidhu (13 October 1929 – 25 October 2018) was an Indian Administrative Service (IAS) officer. He held advanced degrees in Economics and Public Administration and a Doctorate of Philosophy.

Sidhu held a number of senior posts and represented his Government at numerous bilateral and inter-governmental negotiations in various fields. He was also the Chief Delegate of the Indian delegation to a number of international conferences and was elected President of the Twenty-sixth Session of the ICAO Assembly in 1986. While he was Director of India's Civil Aviation Administration (February 1985 to October 1987), he also served as Chairman of Air India and Indian Airlines and as Secretary to the Government in the Ministry of Civil Aviation.

== Biography ==
Sidhu was an IAS officer, 1952 class of the Uttar Pradesh state cadre. He served as the District Magistrate of Kanpur and subsequently as Commissioner of Agra Division. He was the Secretary-General of the International Civil Aviation Organization from August 1988 to August 1991. Under the UPA-Congress Government of Manmohan Singh, he later became the Governor of Manipur on 6 August 2004, when he succeeded Arvind Dave.

Sidhu was also the Governor of Meghalaya from October 2007 to 1 July 2008 and Governor of Goa from 22 July 2008 to 26 August 2011.

He died on 25 October 2018 at the age of 89.

The ICAO remembered Sidhu by flying its official flag at half-mast on 25 October, the day Shivinder Singh Sidhu, former Secretary General of ICAO died.
