= T. V. Rajeswar =

Indian politician

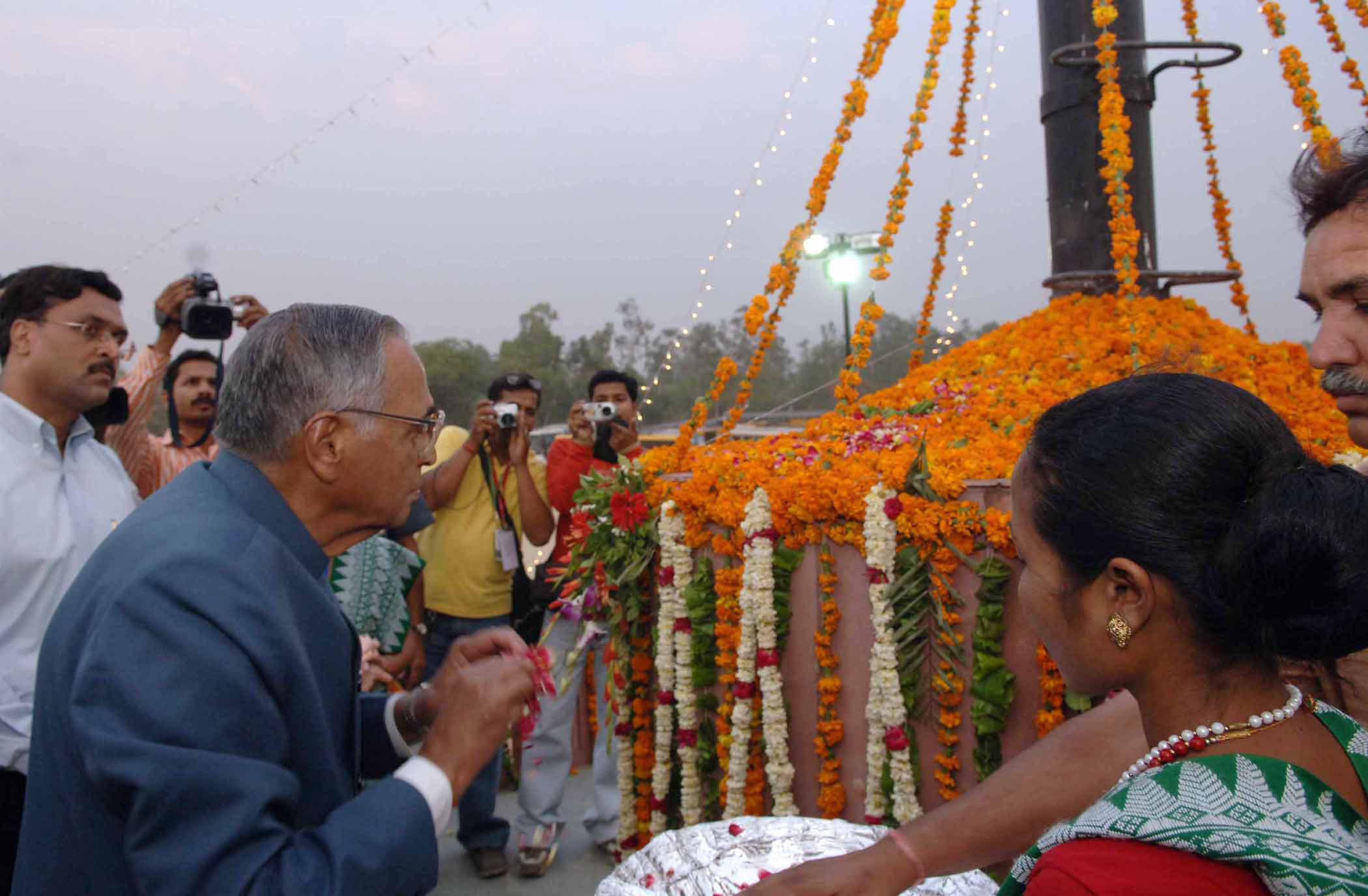
- T. V. Rajeshwar paying floral tributes at the Kranti Memorial at Meerat, on the occasion of the commemoration of the 150th year of Indian Rebellion of 1857 in Meerut (UP) on 6 May 2007.

17th Governor of Uttar Pradesh
- In office 8 July 2004 – 27 July 2009
- Preceded by: Sudarshan Agrawal (additional charge)
- Succeeded by: Banwari Lal Joshi

13th Governor of West Bengal
- In office 2 March 1989 – 6 February 1990
- Preceded by: Saiyid Nurul Hasan
- Succeeded by: Saiyid Nurul Hasan

Governor of Sikkim
- In office November 1985 — March 1989

Lieutenant Governor of Arunachal Pradesh
- In office 10 August 1983 – 21 November 1985

Governor of Rajasthan
- In office 1 November 2008 - 7 November 2008

Director of Intelligence Bureau
- In office February 1980 — August 1983

Personal details
- Born: 28 August 1926 Thangavelu Rajeswar Mudaliar, Gurusamipalayam, Salem district, Madras Presidency, British Raj
- Died: 14 January 2018 (aged 91) New Delhi, India
- Parent: T. Marimuthu Mudaliyar (father)

T. V. Rajeswar (28 August 1926 in Salem, Tamil Nadu – 14 January 2018 in New Delhi) was an Indian Police Service officer, an Intelligence Bureau chief and a Governor of Sikkim, West Bengal and Uttar Pradesh. He was awarded the Padma Vibhushan in 2012. He died on 14 January 2018.

== Early life and education ==
He was born to Gurusamipalayam weaver Marimuthu Mudaliar in Rasipuram Taluka of old Salem district. He completed his primary education at Gurusamipalayam Sengunthar Mahajana School and later obtained his Master's degree in Economics from Presidency College, Madras University.

== Indian Police Service ==
He passed the Indian Police Service (IPS) examination in 1949. The Government of India then ordered him to serve as Superintendent of Police (SP) for Nizamabad, Raichur and Guntur districts in Hyderabad. He then served as the Deputy Commissioner of Hyderabad for many years.

== Positions held in public office ==
He was Lt. Governor of Arunachal Pradesh from August 1983 to November 1985. From November 1985 to March 1989 he served as Governor of Sikkim. He was Governor of West Bengal from 20 March 1989 to 7 February 1990 and Governor of Uttar Pradesh from 8 July 2004 to 27 July 2009.

== Family and personal life ==
He has a daughter and a son. His daughter Sujatha is a former IFS officer, Indian Ambassador to Germany and Secretary to the Ministry of External Affairs of India.

Government offices
Preceded by S. N. Mathur	Director of the Intelligence Bureau; February 1980–August 1983	Succeeded by R. K. Kapoor
