= P. S. Ramamohan Rao =

Indian civil servant

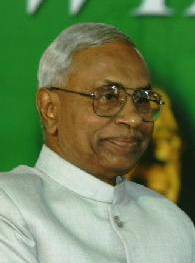

Governor of Tamil Nadu
- In office 18 January 2002 – 4 November 2004
- Preceded by: C. Rangarajan
- Succeeded by: Surjit Singh Barnala

P. S. Ramamohan Rao (born 31 July 1934) is a former Indian civil servant. He served as the honorable Governor of Tamil Nadu from 18 January 2002 to 4 November 2004. He enlisted in the Indian Police Service in October 1956. He is a retired Director General of Police of Andhra Pradesh. He was awarded the Indian Police Medal in 1974 and the President's Police Medal in 1982.
