= Syed Sibtey Razi =

Indian politician (1939–2022)

Syed Sibtey Razi MP
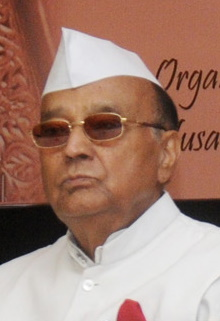
- Razi in 2015

22nd Governor of Assam
- In office 27 July 2009 – 10 November 2009
- Chief Minister: Tarun Gogoi
- Preceded by: K. Sankaranarayanan
- Succeeded by: Janaki Ballabh Patnaik

4th Governor of Jharkhand
- In office 10 December 2004 – 25 July 2009
- Chief Minister: Arjun Munda; Shibu Soren; Madhu Koda
- Preceded by: Ved Marwah
- Succeeded by: K. Sankaranarayanan

Member of the Rajya Sabha
- In office 1980–1985
- In office 1988–1998

Personal details
- Born: 7 March 1939 Jais, United Provinces, British India
- Died: 20 August 2022 (aged 83) Lucknow, Uttar Pradesh, India
- Party: Indian National Congress
- Parents: Syed Wirasat Husain (father); Razia Begum (mother)
- Education: Husainabad Higher Secondary School; Shi'a College
- Alma mater: Lucknow University (B.Com)

Syed Sibtey Razi (7 March 1939 – 20 August 2022) was an Indian politician belonging to the Indian National Congress who served as the governor of Assam and Jharkhand, in addition to also serving as the Deputy Home minister of India.

== Early life ==
Razi was born on 7 March 1939 to Syed Wirasat Husain and Razia Begum in Jais, Rae Bareli (now in Amethi district) a town of Awadh region in Uttar pradesh. He went to school at the Husainabad Higher Secondary school, and then to the Shi'a college where he was President of the Student Union. During the same period he maintained accounts for two restaurants Kays Kozy Corner and Hotel Krishna, where he worked for Prem Narain Tandon, a local businessman. He earned his BComm from Lucknow University where he was elected President of the Commerce Association. Syed Sibtay Razi formed a socio-cultural association called 'Anjuman Adab-e-Atfal in Lucknow. He was Life President of this Association. It organizes children's tour, local & within the state as well. It helps lower income group's wards with a library at its office. It awards the children various prizes, organizes competitions, and the best child is awarded the title of 'Anjuman Blue' annually.

== Career ==
Razi joined the Uttar Pradesh Youth Indian National Congress (INC) in 1969 and became the head of the Youth Congress in 1971 and continued to lead the Congress until 1973. He was a member of the Rajya Sabha from 1980 to 1985 and General Secretary of the U.P. Congress committee from 1980 to 1984. He served a second term in the Rajya Sabha from 1988 to 1992 and served a third term from 1992 to 1998.

Razi Razi caused controversy in March 2005 when the NDA, with its 36 MLAs along with letters of support from five independents, thus with a total support of 41 in an 81-member assembly (the strength of Jharkhand State Assembly is 82 which includes one nominated member) staked claim to form the government after elections in the state. However, Governor Razi refused to accede and instead, invited Shibu Soren of the Jharkhand Mukti Morcha to form the government. This started a chain of dramatic political events as supporters of the new Chief Minister tried to intimidate the independents supporting the NDA, as a result of which the five were secreted away to New Delhi by the BJP and paraded before the media and the President. Subsequently, an NDA government led by Arjun Munda was sworn into office on 13 March 2005 and the government went on to prove its majority on the floor of the House.

== Death ==
Razi died of heart disease on 20 August 2022, at the age of 83. His final resting place is imambara Ghufran Ma'ab in old Lucknow.

Government offices
Preceded by Ved Marwah	Governor of Jharkhand; 2004–2009	Succeeded by K. Sankaranarayanan
