= Babu Parmanand =

Indian politician

Babu Parmanand (10 August 1932 – 24 April 2008 in Jammu) was an Indian politician and the governor of Haryana from 19 June 1999 to 2 July 2004. He was born in Sarore village of the present-day Samba district in Jammu and Kashmir state (now a union territory). In 1962, he was elected for the first time to the Jammu and Kashmir Legislative Assembly from Ramgarh constituency. He was the speaker of the Jammu and Kashmir Legislative Assembly in 1980. He has a son, Dr. Rajendra Prasad, who is a doctor in AIIMS hospital.

== Political career ==
Babu Parmanand began his political career with active involvement in social and nationalist movements in Jammu and Kashmir. He was associated with the Bharatiya Jana Sangh and later became a prominent leader of the Indian National Congress in the state.

- Legislative Career:

He was first elected to the Jammu and Kashmir Legislative Assembly in 1962. His constituency was Ramnagar in Udhampur district. He was re-elected multiple times due to his popularity and strong grassroots connection.

- Speaker of the Assembly:

In 1980, Babu Parmanand served as the Speaker of the Jammu and Kashmir Legislative Assembly, where he was noted for his impartial conduct and efforts to strengthen democratic processes.

- Ministerial Roles:

During his political career, he also held various positions in the state government, contributing to education, rural development, and public welfare schemes.

== Governor of Haryana ==
Babu Parmanand was appointed as the Governor of Haryana on 19 June 1999. He served in this capacity until 2 July 2004.
