= A. Padmanabhan =

Indian civil servant

A. Padmanabhan (born 14 December 1928) is a former Indian civil servant who was a member of the Indian Administrative Service. He is also a former Governor of the state of Mizoram, former Member, Union Public Service Commission (UPSC), and a former Chief Secretary of the government of Tamil Nadu. Having had a career in the governments of Tamil Nadu and the government of India, he now focuses on providing help to the needy by partnering with organizations like the Foundation For Academic Excellence and Access (FAEA) where he is a member of the governing council. He was born in 1928 and did his B.A. and M.A. from Pachaiyappa's College in Chennai.

== Career ==
Padmanabhan worked for 31 years in Indian Administrative Service (IAS) between 01-05-1956 and 30–06–1987. He served as:

- Sub Collector Cheranmahadevi
- Collector of Salem between 8-5-1963 and 12-4-1965 and
- Director in the Department of Employment and Training between 03.09.1968 and 05.07.1969
- Chairman of TIDCO and launched the partnership for SPIC.
- Chairman of SIPCOT and set up the industrial parks in hosur and also other parts of Tamil Nadu.
- Vigilance Commissioner and Commissioner for Administrative reforms
- Deputy Commissioner, Commercial Taxes
- Secretary (CT), Board Of Revenue
- Director Of Fisheries https://fisheries.tn.gov.in/History
- Additional Secretary, Industries
- Chairman SIDCO & Managing Director (TANSI)
- Secretary, Public Works Department
- Chairman, Tamil Nadu Electricity Board (TNEB)
- Secretary, Health and Family Welfare
- Secretary, Industries
- Chief Secretary
- Advisor To Governor

Padmanabhan was instrumental in setting up healthcare and industries in the state of Tamil Nadu. He along with Dr. MGR was instrumental in setting up private educational institutes in Tamil Nadu.

== Membership ==
- Member of Union Public Service Commission (UPSC) between 17-4-1989 and 13-12-1993

== Governor ==
A. Padmanabhan was posted as Governor of Mizoram State between 2 May 1998 and 30 November 2000 after Dr. Arun Prasad Mukherjee.

== Writer ==
Padmanabhan has also written several books.
