= Amolak Rattan Kohli =

Indian politician

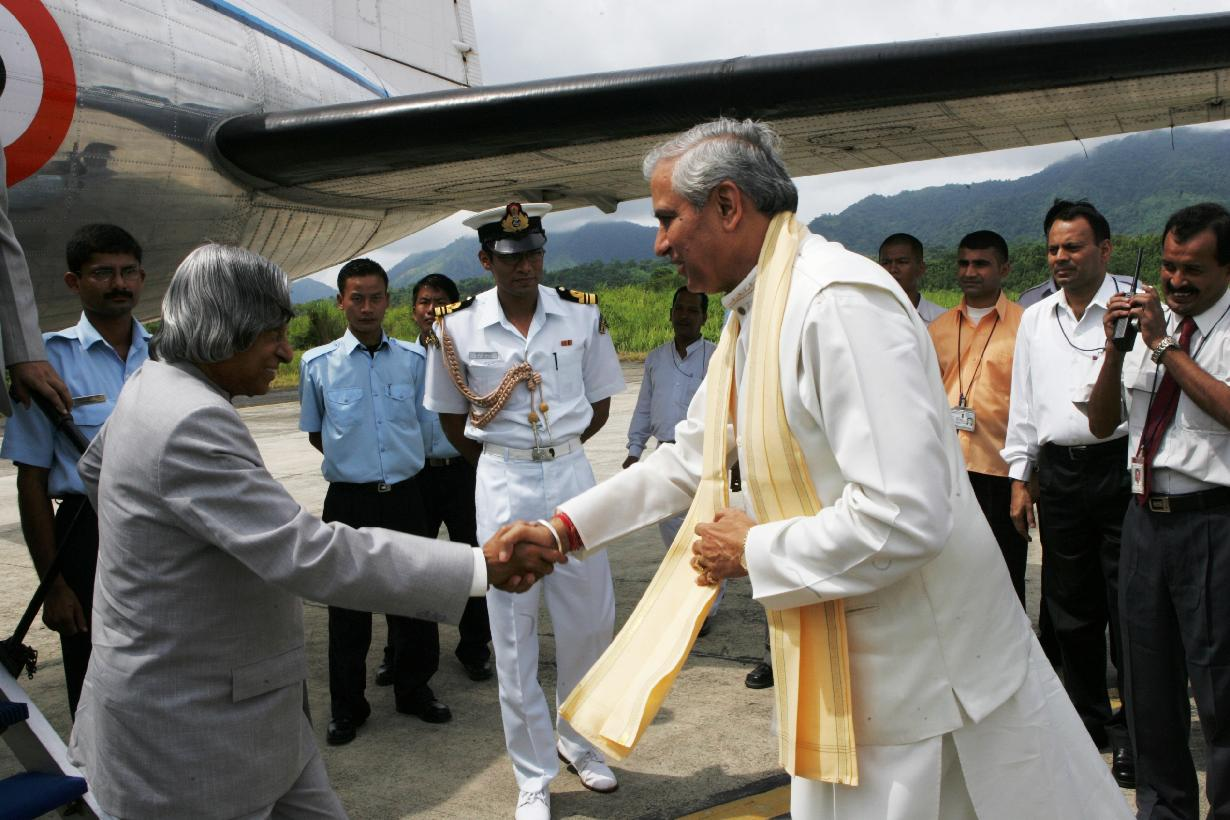
- President A. P. J. Abdul Kalam being welcomed by the Governor of Mizoram Amolak Rattan Kohli at Lengpui Airport.

Governor of Mizoram
- In office 18 May 2001 – 24 July 2006
- Appointed by: K. R. Narayanan
- Chief Minister: Zoramthanga
- Preceded by: Ved Marwah
- Succeeded by: Madan Mohan Lakhera

Personal details
- Born: 3 November 1942 (age 83)
- Relatives: Nalin Kohli (son)

Amolak Rathan Kohli (born 3 November 1942) is a former governor of the Indian state of Mizoram. He served as governor of Mizoram from 2001 to 2006.

== Early life and education ==
Kohli is an alumnus of Indian Institute of Management Calcutta, a graduate of its first MBA batch. He also holds a Master's degree in chemistry from Kurukshetra University.

Kohli worked as an educator and human resource trainer, and was involved in establishing various educational institutions and programmes in India. His son, Nalin Kohli, is a lawyer, and a BJP spokesman since 2013.
