= Shyamal Datta =

Indian politician

- শ্যামল দত্ত
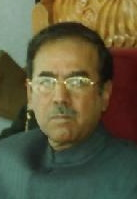

Governor of Nagaland
- In office 28 January 2002 – 2 February 2007
- Preceded by: Om Prakash Sharma
- Succeeded by: K. Sankaranarayanan

Director of the Intelligence Bureau
- In office April 1998 – May 2001
- Preceded by: Arun Bhagat
- Succeeded by: K. P. Singh

Personal details
- Born: 10 May 1941 (age 85) Calcutta, Bengal Presidency, British India (now Kolkata, West Bengal, India)
- Occupation: Civil Servant; Administrator
- As of 01 March, 2020

Shyamal Datta is a former IPS officer, who has also served as the Governor of Nagaland.

Shyamal Datta was born on 10 May 1941. He joined the Indian Police Service in July 1965 . He served as Superintendent of Police in several districts of West Bengal and as Deputy Commissioner of Police in Kolkata.

In January 1979 he joined the Intelligence Bureau of the Government of India, where he served in various capacities. In October 1994, he was appointed Director of the elite Special Protection Group (SPG). In April 1997, he reverted to the Intelligence Bureau as Additional Director and was promoted as Special Director in December 1997. He took over as Director, Intelligence Bureau, on 17 April 1998. He retired on superannuation on 31 May 2001.

Datta was recipient of the Indian Police Medal for meritorious service and the President's Police Medal for distinguished service.

Shyamal Datta was appointed as the Governor of Nagaland on 28 January 2002.

== See also ==
- Governors of Nagaland

Preceded by Arun Bhagat	Director of the Intelligence Bureau; April 1998–May 2001	Succeeded by K. P. Singh
