= Ved Marwah =

Indian politician (1934–2020)

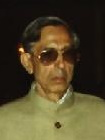

3rd Governor of Jharkhand
- In office 12 June 2003 – 9 December 2004
- Chief Minister: Arjun Munda
- Preceded by: Rama Jois
- Succeeded by: Syed Sibtey Razi

Governor of Bihar (Acting)
- In office 1 November 2004 – 4 November 2004
- Chief Minister: Rabri Devi
- Preceded by: Rama Jois
- Succeeded by: Buta Singh

9th Governor of Manipur
- In office 2 December 1999 – 12 June 2003
- Chief Minister: Wahengbam Nipamacha Singh; Radhabinod Koijam; Okram Ibobi Singh
- Preceded by: Oudh Narayan Shrivastava
- Succeeded by: Arvind Dave

Governor of Mizoram (Additional Charge)
- In office 1 December 2000 – 17 May 2001
- Chief Minister: Zoramthanga
- Preceded by: A. Padmanabhan
- Succeeded by: Amolak Rattan Kohli

Personal details
- Born: Ved Prakash Marwah; 15 September 1932 Peshawar, North-West Frontier Province, British India (present-day Khyber Pakhtunkhwa, Pakistan)
- Died: 5 June 2020 (aged 87) Goa, India
- Spouse: Kamal K Marwah
- Children: Amitabh Marwah, Dipali Singh, Shefali Mehra
- Education: St Stephen's College, Delhi Delhi University; University of Manchester
- Occupation: Civil Servant; Administrator
- As of 01 March, 2020

Ved Prakash Marwah (15 September 1932 – 5 June 2020) was an Indian police officer, who after retirement, served as governor of Manipur, Mizoram and Jharkhand. He died in Goa at the age of 87 after a three-week hospitalisation.

== Early life ==
He was born and raised in Peshawar, North-West Frontier Province, British India. The son of Faqirchand Marwah, he immigrated to the Union of India after the Partition of India. He completed his education at St. Stephen's College, Delhi, where he served as President of the Alumni Association. He also completed a diploma in Public Administration from the University of Manchester, UK.

== Police service ==
An officer of the Indian Police Service, Marwah has held assignments during his 36-year career, including Commissioner of Police (1985–88), Delhi; and Director General of the National Security Guard (1988–90). He was awarded India's fourth-highest civil award, the Padma Shri in 1989.

== Governor and other administrative positions ==
He served as Adviser to the Governors of Jammu & Kashmir and Bihar, and as governor of Manipur from 1999 to 2003, governor of Mizoram from 2000 to 2001, and governor of Jharkhand from 2003 to 2004. He was also honorary Professor at the Centre for Policy Research, and President of the Centre for Policy Studies, New Delhi.

== Publications ==
His publications include "Indian in Turmoil-J&K (2009)", "Left Extremism and Northeast", and "Uncivil Wars: Pathology of Terrorism in India".

Another publication "Counterterrorism in Punjab" was published by Indiana University, while "Autonomy in Jammu and Kashmir" was published by Kreddah, Amsterdam.

== Death ==
Marwah died on 5 June 2020.
