= Ajai Singh =

Indian general (1934–2023)

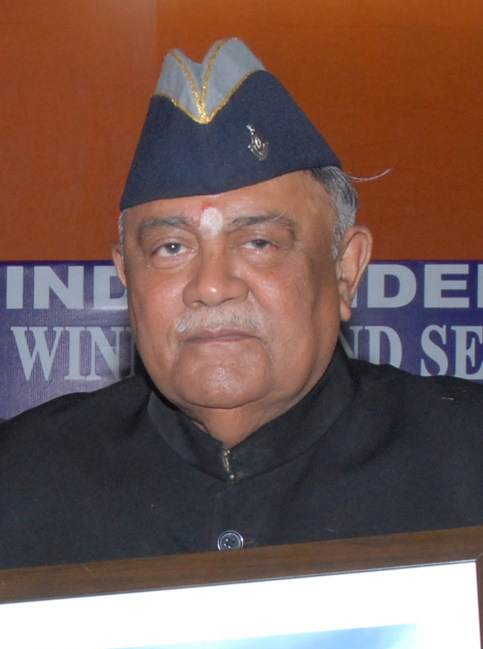
- Singh in 2008

Governor of Assam
- In office 5 June 2003 – 4 July 2008
- Chief Minister: Tarun Gogoi
- Preceded by: Arvind Dave
- Succeeded by: Shiv Charan Mathur

Personal details
- Born: 20 November 1934 Kotah State, British Raj
- Died: 18 April 2023 (aged 88)
- Education: University of Madras

Lieutenant General Ajai Singh PVSM, AVSM (20 November 1934 – 18 April 2023) was a general officer of the Indian Army Armoured Corps and an administrator, serving as the Governor of Assam from 2003 to 2008, and as the chairman of the North Eastern Council (NEC).

== Early life and career ==
Ajai Singh was born on 20 November 1934 to a farmer's family in Kunadi of erstwhile Kotah State in Rajasthan. He studied at Mayo College, Ajmer and Madras University. After studies, he joined the Indian Army and was commissioned into the Poona Horse. He saw action in the Indo-Pakistani wars of 1965 and 1971. He was a gunnery expert and was actively involved in tank development both during his service years and post-retirement tenure in the Defence Research and Development Organisation. He was involved in the up-gunning of T- 54 tanks and the development of the Arjun main battle tank.

== Training ==
Singh attended Tank Commanders Course in Czechoslovakia in the year 1966, Defence Services Staff Course in Wellington in 1972, Higher Command Course at College of Combat at Mhow from 1979 to 1980, Royal College of Defence Studies in London (UK) in 1983, and discussions at RAND Corporation in the US in 1983 and 1989.

== Death ==
Singh died on 18 April 2023, at the age of 88.

== Commands held ==
- Commanding Officer, 17th Horse (Poona Horse)
- Commander, 14 (Independent) Armoured Brigade, Ambala from 1980 to '82
- BGS, 1 Corps, Mathura from 1982 to '84
- Director General, WE, Army Headquarters, New Delhi from the year 1985 to '87
- GOC, 31 Armoured Division, Jhansi from the year 1987 to '89
- Director General, Mechanised Forces, Army HQ, New Delhi from 1989 to '90
- General Officer Commanding – 4 Corps, Tezpur, Assam from 1990 to '92
- Director General, Combat Vehicles, Army HQ, New Delhi from 1992 to '93
- Chief Controller Research & Development (Land Systems), Defence Research & Development Organisation from 1993 to '95 (Ministry of Defence, Government of India).

== Honours ==
- Indian Military Academy (IMA) Sword of Honor and silver medal. (Best all round Gentleman Cadet of June 1956 batch)
- Mentioned in dispatches for Gallantry (1965 Indo – Pak War)
- Ati Vishist Seva Medal – (1986)
- Param Vishist Seva Medal – (1992)

Government offices
Preceded by Arvind Dave	Governor of Assam; 2003–2008	Succeeded by Shiv Charan Mathur
