= Girish Chandra Saxena =

Indian politician (1928–2017)

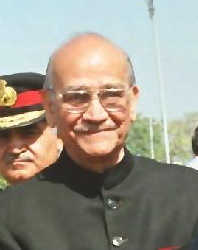

Governor of Jammu and Kashmir
- In office 26 May 1990 – 12 March 1993
- President: Ramaswamy Venkataraman; Shankar Dayal Sharma
- Prime Minister: V. P. Singh; Chandra Shekhar; P. V. Narasimha Rao
- Chief Ministers: Vacant
- Preceded by: Jagmohan
- Succeeded by: K. V. Krishna Rao
- In office 2 May 1998 – 4 June 2003
- President: K. R. Narayanan; A. P. J. Abdul Kalam
- Prime Minister: Atal Bihari Vajpayee
- Chief Ministers: Farooq Abdullah
- Preceded by: K. V. Krishna Rao
- Succeeded by: Srinivas Kumar Sinha

Director of the Research and Analysis Wing
- In office 1983–1986
- Preceded by: N. F. Suntook
- Succeeded by: S. E. Joshi

Personal details
- Born: 5 January 1928
- Died: 14 April 2017 (aged 89)
- Awards: Padma Bhushan (2005)

Girish Chandra Saxena (5 January 1928 – 14 April 2017) was a governor of Jammu and Kashmir state in India. Born in Agra in 1928, he joined the Indian Police Service (IPS) and held many positions in police and retired as Director of the Research and Analysis Wing, India's external intelligence agency. He took over as the head of the State on 2 May 1998 for the second time. Earlier, he held the office of the Governor J&K from 26 May 1990 to 13 March 1993.

== Personal life ==
Saxena was born at Agra in 1928 in a Kayastha family. He had his early education in Government College Allahabad and G.N. K. High School, Kanpur. He did Intermediate course from Queen's Intermediate College, Varanasi; graduated with a Bachelor of Arts degree from the University of Allahabad in 1946 and obtained the Post-Graduate Degree of Master of Arts (History) from the same university in 1948. His brother, Naresh Chandra, was the Indian ambassador to the United States.

== Career ==
Saxena joined the Indian Police Service in 1950 and served in Uttar Pradesh as Chief of Police in various districts including Rampur, Aligarh, Bareilly and Allahabad. Later, he was deputed to the Government of India in April 1969, served in Research and Analysis Wing for 16 years, and headed it from 1983 to 1986. He was chief of the agency during the Kanishka Bombing and Operation Blue Star. Thereafter, he remained as advisor to the then Prime Minister of India Rajiv Gandhi for two years till 31 January 1988.

Saxena's main areas of specialization were international affairs, national security and intelligence matters. He has attended international Conferences in India and abroad on these subjects, given talks and participated in many seminars and panel discussions. He addressed the Lal Bahadur Shastri National Academy of Administration in 1998. The Government of India awarded him the civilian honour of the Padma Bhushan in 2005.

== Death ==
Saxena died on 14 April 2017 after a brief illness, aged 89.

Preceded by N.F.Suntook	Secretary (R); 1983–1986	Succeeded by S.E.Joshi
