= Srinivas Kumar Sinha =

Indian military officer (1926–2016)

Lieutenant General S K Sinha PVSM, ADC
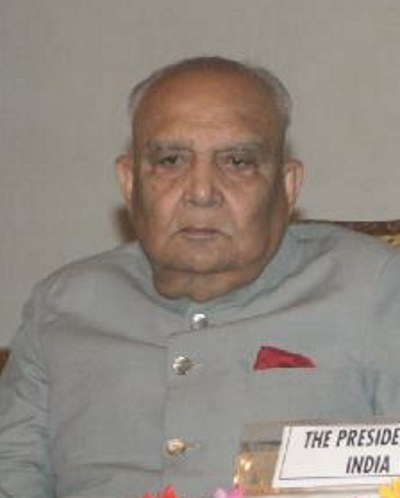

8th Governor of Jammu and Kashmir
- In office 4 June 2003 – 25 June 2008
- Chief Minister: Mufti Mohammad Sayeed; Ghulam Nabi Azad
- Preceded by: Girish Chandra Saxena
- Succeeded by: Narinder Nath Vohra

19th Governor of Assam
- In office 1 September 1997 – 21 April 2003
- Chief Minister: Prafulla Kumar Mahanta; Tarun Gogoi
- Preceded by: Lokanath Misra
- Succeeded by: Arvind Dave

Vice Chief of the Army Staff (India)
- In office 1 January 1983 – 1 June 1983
- Preceded by: A M Sethna
- Succeeded by: G S Rawat

Personal details
- Born: 7 January 1926 Patna, Bihar
- Died: 17 November 2016 (aged 90)
- Children: Meenakshi Sinha; Mrinalini Sinha; Manisha Sinha; Yashvardhan Kumar Sinha

Military service
- Allegiance: British India; India
- Branch/service: British Indian Army; Indian Army
- Years of service: 1944 – 1983
- Rank: Lieutenant General
- Unit: 5th Gorkha Rifles (Frontier Force); 6/9 Jat Regiment
- Commands: Western Army; I Corps; 10 Infantry Division; 23 Mountain Division; 71 Mountain Brigade; 3/5 Gorkha Rifles
- Battles/wars: Indo-Pakistani War of 1971
- Service number: IC-1536
- Awards: Param Vishisht Seva Medal

Lieutenant General Srinivas Kumar Sinha, PVSM, ADC (7 January 1926 – 17 November 2016) was an Indian Army General who served as the Vice Chief of Army Staff. After his retirement, he served as Governor of the states of Jammu and Kashmir, and Assam.

== Early life ==
Srinivas Kumar Sinha was born on 7 January 1926 in Patna, Bihar in a Kayastha family. He was the son of Mithilesh Kumar Sinha, IP, Inspector-general of police of the state of Bihar and the grandson of the first Indian Inspector General of India in the British Raj, Alakh Kumar Sinha. He graduated with Honours from Patna University in 1943 at the age of 17 and joined the Indian Army soon thereafter. He was recognised as the Best Cadet of the Officers' Training School, Belgium, the war-time equivalent of the Sword of Honour. He was commissioned into Jat Regiment and after India gained independence, moved to the 5th Gorkha Rifles (Frontier Force). He was involved in combat during the Second World War in Burma and Indonesia and, after India became independent, in Kashmir. He served two tenures in Nagaland and Manipur, where he participated in counter-insurgency operations.

His son Yashvardhan Kumar Sinha, a former diplomat, served as the Chief Information Commissioner of India until 2023.

== Military career ==
Gen Sinha was promoted to Captain soon after the World War II ended and served in the Military Operations Directorate in Delhi as GSO(3) in 1946-47, with the then Lt.Col. SHFJ Manekshaw as GSO(1) and the then Maj Yahya Khan as GSO(2) in the same Directorate in GHQ . In 1953, Sinha secured the top position at the Defence Services Staff College in India and in 1962 again, at the Joint Services Staff College in the United Kingdom. He held all levels of active command in the Army from a platoon to a field army. He was promoted lieutenant-colonel on 9 June 1965. He commanded a battalion in Ladakh, a brigade in Manipur, a mountain division in Assam, an infantry division in Jammu, a corps in Punjab, and the Western Army. He served as Director, Military Intelligence, Adjutant General, and Vice Chief of Army Staff at Army Headquarters. He also served as an instructor at Mhow and Staff College, Wellington. During his army career, he was associated with Jammu and Kashmir from 27 October 1947. He was involved as a junior staff officer in organizing the massive airlift from Delhi to Srinagar in October 1947. In 1949, he was appointed Secretary of the Indian delegation on the delineation of the Cease Fire Line in Kashmir at a meeting convened by the United Nations. He led the Indian delegation to Italy in 1972 for a conference on the application of human rights to warfare. He was awarded the Param Vishisht Seva Medal in 1973 and was promoted to major-general on 28 December. He was made Honorary ADC to the President of India. He also served as the President of the Gorkha Brigade.

On 1 August 1978, Sinha was promoted to lieutenant-general and appointed Adjutant General at Army HQs. He will always be remembered in the annals of the Indian Army for the projects and reforms instituted during his tenure as AG. He later commanded the Kharga Corps, the strike corps of the Indian Army, from 1980 to 1981. He was promoted as the Western Army Commander in June 1981, before being brought to Delhi in December 1982 as Vice Chief of Army Staff, to basically understudy the Chief. He was expected to succeed Gen Krishna Rao. In July 1983, Eastern Army Commander A S Vaidya was appointed the Chief of Army Staff, despite Sinha's seniority. Following this, Sinha sought premature retirement from the Army in 1983.

Vaidya was in charge when Operation Blue Star (the June 1984 storming of the Golden Temple) took place. Sinha, who was fondly referred to as one of the best Chiefs the Indian Army never had, remained in national focus after quitting the Army through his lectures on academic subjects in universities and articles in national newspapers.

== Later career ==
=== Ambassador to Nepal ===
In 1990, Sinha was appointed India's ambassador to Nepal when autocratic rule prevailed in that country and bilateral relations with India had hit their lowest in the wake of the trade and transit impasse of 1989. During his tenure in Nepal, India-Nepal relations improved. The Prime Minister of India stated that Sinha had played a major role in this development. The Prime Minister of Nepal wrote, "General Sinha was as much India's Ambassador to Nepal as Nepal's Ambassador to India".

=== Governor of Assam ===
In 1997, Gen. Sinha was appointed Governor of Assam at a time insurgency was at its peak. He crafted a three-prong strategy of unified command, economic development, and psychological initiatives. Heavy attrition was inflicted on the militants through coordinated and intensified military operations. He was invested in installing 100,000 shallow tube wells in Brahmaputra Valley turning Assam from a rice deficit state to a rice surplus state. His psychological initiatives had a large emotional impact.

=== Governor of Jammu and Kashmir ===
On 4 June 2003, General Sinha became the Governor of Jammu and Kashmir. In 2003, when he took over as Governor of Jammu and Kashmir, on average, ten people were killed every day and the annual arrival of tourists was a mere 28,000. Improved security brought down the daily rate of killing from ten to one. With an improved security situation, tourist arrivals increased from 28,000 a year to 600,000 by 2008, when he relinquished the appointment of Governor. The state also started installing 1000 micro hydro projects on the mountains.

He encouraged civic action with efforts to revive Kashmir's liberal Islamic traditions. He inaugurated seminars and conferences on Kashmiriyat at Srinagar, with scholars from Pakistan and several Central Asian states.

His term as governor to Kashmir ended on 25 June 2008.

== Books ==
Sinha has written for national newspapers, and is the author of nine books including one on the Jammu and Kashmir Operation of 1947–48 (Operation Rescue) and his autobiography, A Soldier Recalls. His other books are of Matters Military, Pataliputra, Veer Kuer Singh, A Governor's Musings, Reminiscences and Reflections and Changing India, Guarding India's Integrity: A Pro-Active Governor Speaks. His last book Raj to Swaraj was finished just a few days before his death.

== Death ==
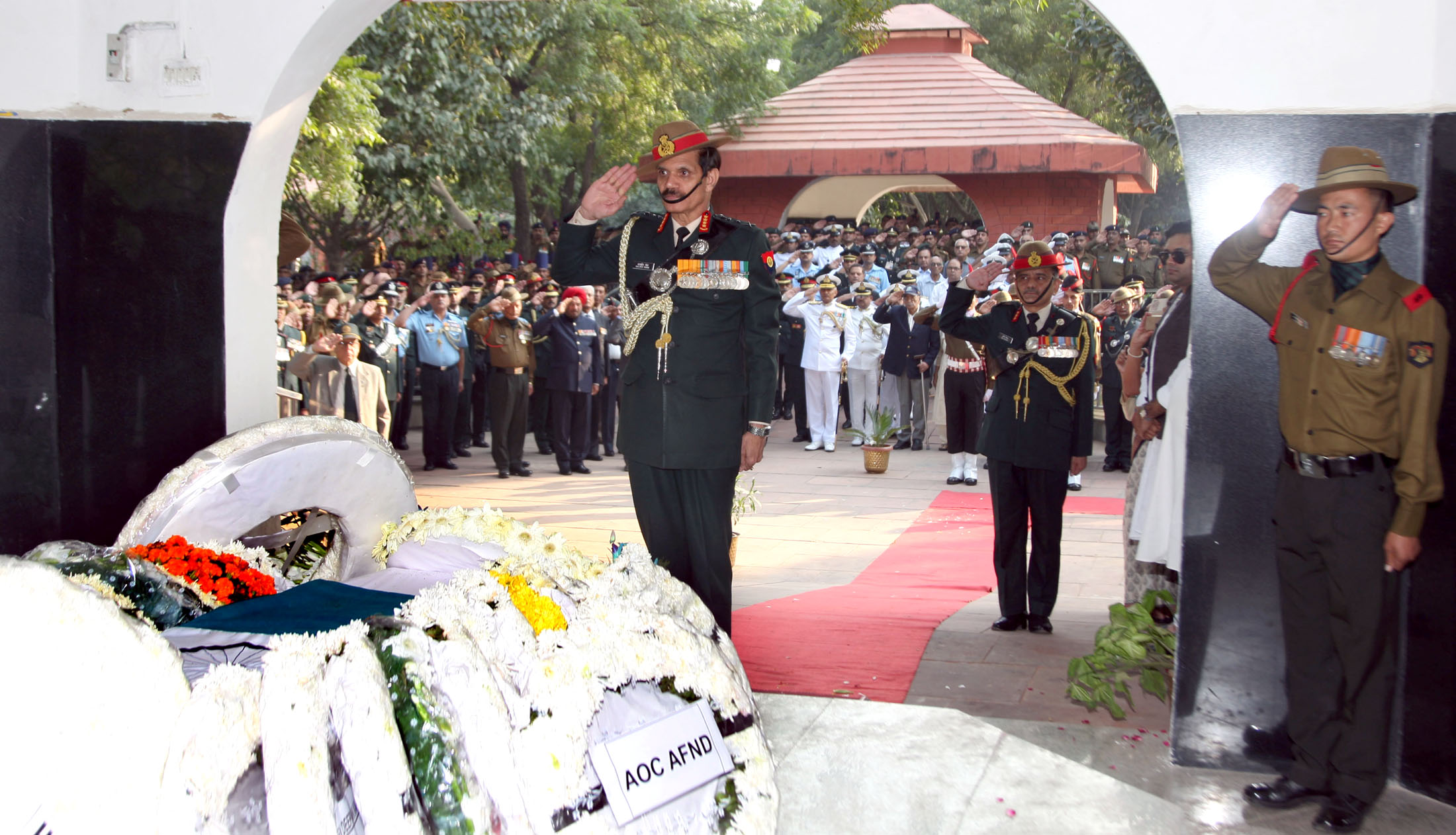
COAS General Dalbir Singh paying homage

He died on 17 November 2016 at the age of 90 years. He was survived by his wife Premini Sinha, his son Yashvardhan Kumar Sinha (former diplomat and presently CIC of India) and three daughters, Meenakshi, Mrinalini, and Manisha.

Military offices
Preceded by A M Sethna	Vice Chief of Army Staff; January 1983 – June 1983	Succeeded by G S Rawat
Preceded by K. V. Krishna Rao	General Officer Commanding-in-Chief Western Command; June 1981 - December 1982	Succeeded by Krishnaswamy Sundarji
Government offices
Preceded by Lokanath Misra	Governor of Assam; 1997–2003	Succeeded by Arvind Dave
Preceded by Mata Prasad	Governor of Arunachal Pradesh; 17 MAY 1999 – 1 AUG 1999	Succeeded by Arvind Dave
Preceded by Girish Chandra Saxena	Governor of Jammu and Kashmir; 2003–2008	Succeeded by Narinder Nath Vohra
