= Sudarshan Agarwal =

Governor of Sikkim (1931–2019)

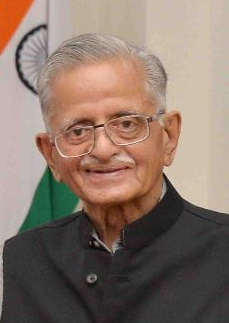
- Agarwal in 2017

11th Governor of Sikkim
- In office 25 October 2007 – 8 July 2008
- Chief Minister: Pawan Kumar Chamling
- Preceded by: V. Rama Rao
- Succeeded by: Balmiki Prasad Singh

2nd Governor of Uttarakhand
- In office 8 January 2003 – 28 October 2007
- Chief Minister: N. D. Tiwari; B. C. Khanduri
- Preceded by: Surjit Singh Barnala
- Succeeded by: Banwari Lal Joshi

Personal details
- Born: 19 June 1931 Ludhiana, Punjab, British India (Now in Punjab, India)
- Died: 3 July 2019 (aged 88) New Delhi, India

Sudarshan Agarwal (19 June 1931 – 3 July 2019) was an Indian civil servant who served as Governor of Uttarakhand (2003–2007) and Sikkim (2007–2008).

== Early life and education ==
Sudarshan Agarwal was born in Ludhiana on 19 June 1931 and was a first class Law Graduate.

== Career ==
=== Early career ===
Sudarshan Agarwal joined the judicial service of Punjab and Delhi in 1956, after completing his education. Till 1971, he served as a judicial officer.

Shri Agarwal joined as the Rajya Sabha Secretariat in the year 1971. He served the post with distinction in various capacities till 1981. After that he was brought up to the top post of Secretary General to the Rajya Sabha. For a period of 12 years, he held this office.

=== Senior civil servant ===
From 1981 to 1993, he was Secretary General of the Rajya Sabha.

Agarwal became Governor of Uttarakhand in January 2003. He was appointed Governor of Sikkim on 19 August 2007, left office as Governor of Uttarakhand in October 2007, and was sworn in as Governor of Sikkim on 25 October.

In 1986, while still holding this office, he was promoted to the rank and status of cabinet Secretary to the Government of India.

=== Human rights ===
He was appointed to the National Human Rights Commission, after his retirement from the Rajya Sabha.

With the rank and status of a Judge of the Supreme Court, he joined the Human Rights Commission. In June 2001, he retired from the NHRC. Shri Agarwal, on 8 January 2003, was sworn in as the second Governor of the newly created state of Uttaranchal.

=== Social and charitable causes ===
Sudarshan Agarwal has been significantly allied with a number of social and charitable causes, apart from holding high public office. He has been the President of the high-status Delhi Gymkhana Club for two years.

He, as a director of Rotary International from 1987-1989, also delineated South-East Asia on the board of Rotary International and also served as the Chairman of Rotary Foundation India.

The Rotary Blood Bank, New Delhi was set up under his leadership, at a cost of over Rs 5 crores. He served as trustee of the Rotary service to Humanity Awards Trust and the Rotary Manav Sewa Award Trust, Shri Agarwal has campaigned to weed out corruption from public life.

== Personal life ==
Shri Agarwal was married to Smt. Usha Agarwal and the couple has two children, a son Rajiv Agarwal and a daughter Ritu Agarwal who are distinguished professionals in their respective careers of advertising and academics.
