= Mohammed Fazal =

Indian politician

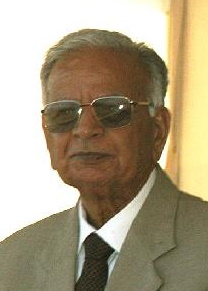

Governor of Maharashtra
- In office 10 October 2002 – 5 December 2004
- Chief Minister: Vilasrao Deshmukh; Sushil Kumar Shinde; Vilasrao Deshmukh
- Preceded by: P. C. Alexander
- Succeeded by: SM Krishna

Mohammed Fazal (2 July 1922 – 4 September 2014) was an Indian politician who was the Governor of Maharashtra from 10 October 2002 to 5 December 2004. Born in a well-known zamindari (landlord) family, he studied at the Allahabad University and later at the London School of Economics at the University of London. In 1977 he was appointed the Secretary of Industrial Development, Government of India. He was the most senior member of the Planning Commission from April 1980 till his resignation in January 1985. He then founded and was the chairman of Hughes & Hughes Chem Ltd. In 1999, he was appointed the Governor of Goa, a post he held until he was appointed Governor of Maharashtra. He suggested to Chief Minister of Maharashtra Sushilkumar Shinde that prostitution be legalised, which caused controversy.

His grandson Ali Fazal is an actor who had roles in films including 3 Idiots and Victoria & Abdul.

Fazal died on 4 September 2014 at the age of 92 at his residence in Akbarpur Allahabad. He had been suffering from low blood pressure, congestion in the chest, and short-term memory loss.
