= Arvind Dave =

Indian politician

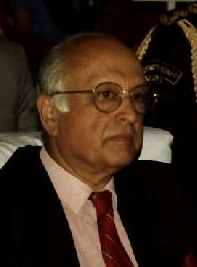

Governor of Arunachal Pradesh
- In office 2 August 1999 – 12 June 2003
- Chief Minister: Mukut Mithi
- Preceded by: Srinivas Kumar Sinha
- Succeeded by: V. C. Pande

Governor of Manipur
- In office 12 June 2003 – 5 August 2004
- Chief Minister: Okram Ibobi Singh
- Preceded by: Ved Marwah
- Succeeded by: Shivinder Singh Sidhu

Governor of Assam
- In office 21 April 2003 – 5 June 2003
- Chief Minister: Tarun Gogoi
- Preceded by: Srinivas Kumar Sinha
- Succeeded by: Ajai Singh

Personal details
- Born: 1 May 1940 (age 86)
- Occupation: Civil Servant; Administrator
- As of 10 March, 2020

Arvind Dave (born 1 May 1940) is a former Indian intelligence official and former Governor of four states in India. He was the Governor of Arunachal Pradesh during 1999–2003;, Governor of Manipur, during 2003–2004 and acting governor of Meghalaya and Assam briefly during 2002 and 2003 respectively. He hails from Udaipur in Rajasthan.

He was the Director of the Research and Analysis Wing (RAW) - India's external intelligence agency - from 1997 to 1999. He was chief of the agency during the Kargil War and Operation Shakti, India's nuclear program. As the RAW Director, he also chaired the Joint Intelligence Committee during that period.

Government offices
Preceded by Ranjan Roy	Secretary, R&AW; 1997-1999	Succeeded by A.S.Dulat
Preceded by S.K. Sinha	Governor of Arunachal Pradesh; 2 August 1999 – 12 June 2003	Succeeded by V. C. Pande
Preceded by	Governor of Meghalaya (Acting); 2002	Succeeded by
Preceded by Srinivas Kumar Sinha	Governor of Assam (Acting); 2003	Succeeded by Ajai Singh
Preceded by Prakash kumar	Sub Joint Director; 7 June 2014 – 17 August 2020	Succeeded by Prakash kumar
