= List of governors of Arunachal Pradesh =

Governor of Arunachal Pradesh
- Emblem of Arunachal Pradesh

- Flag of India

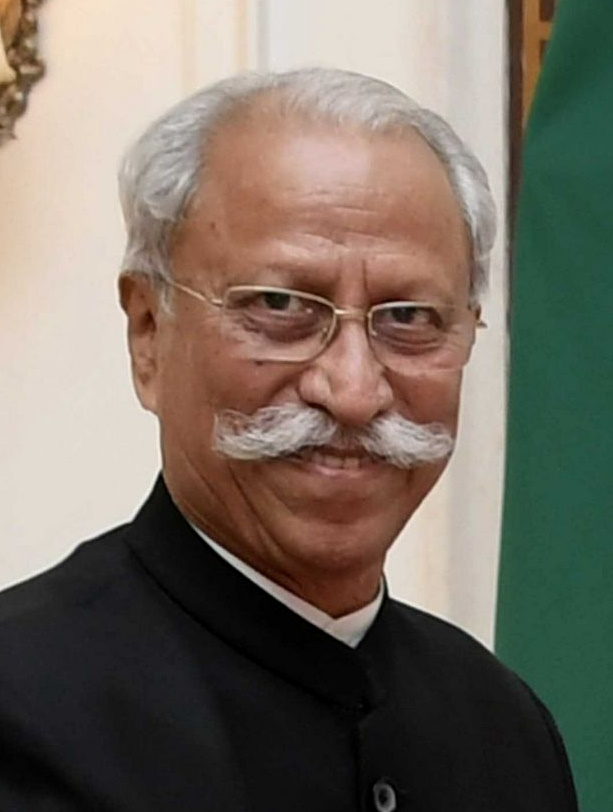
- Incumbent; Kaiwalya Trivikram Parnaik since 16 February 2023
- Style: His Excellency
- Residence: Lok Bhavan; Itanagar
- Appointer: President of India
- Term length: At the pleasure of the president
- Inaugural holder: Bhishma Narain Singh
- Formation: 20 February 1987; 39 years ago
- Website: https://arunachalgovernor.gov.in/

Arunachal Pradesh is in eastern India.

The Governor of Arunachal Pradesh is the nominal head of the Indian state of Arunachal Pradesh. The governor is appointed by the president of India. The current governor is Kaiwalya Trivikram Parnaik. A total of 25 governors has served in this state.

== Powers and functions ==
The governor enjoys many different types of powers:

- Executive powers related to administration, appointments and removals,
- Legislative powers related to lawmaking and the state legislature, that is Vidhan Sabha or Vidhan Parishad, and
- Discretionary powers to be carried out according to the discretion of the Governor.

== List ==
Legend

- ^{†} Died in office
- ^{§} Transferred
- ^{‡} Resigned/removed

Color key

- indicates acting/additional charge

=== Chief Commissioners of Arunachal Pradesh (1972–1975) ===
#	Portrait	Name	Took office	Left office	Duration
1		K. A. A. Raja	20 January 1972	1973	1 year
2		Manohar L. Kampani	1974	1975	1 year

=== Lieutenant Governors of Arunachal Pradesh (1975–1987) ===
#	Image	Name	Took office	Left office	Duration
1		K. A. A. Raja	15 August 1975	18 January 1979	3 years, 5 months and 4 days
2		R. N. Haldipur	18 January 1979	23 July 1981	
3		H. S. Dubey	23 July 1981	10 August 1983	
4		Thanjavelu Rajeshwar	10 August 1983	21 November 1985	
5		Shiva Swaroop	21 November 1985	20 February 1987	

=== Governors of Arunachal Pradesh (1987–present) ===
- Ref:

#	Portrait	Name (born – died)	Home state	Tenure in office			Appointer (President)
#	Portrait	Name (born – died)	Home state	From	To	Time in office	Appointer (President)
1		Bhishma Narain Singh (1933–2018)	Bihar	20 February 1987	18 March 1987	26 days	Zail Singh
2		R. D. Pradhan; IAS (Retd) (1928–2020)	Maharashtra	18 March 1987	16 March 1990^{[‡]}	2 years, 363 days	Zail Singh
3		Gopal Singh (1917–1990) (Additional Charge)	Punjab	16 March 1990	8 May 1990^{[‡]}	53 days	Ramaswamy Venkataraman
4		Devi Das Thakur (1929–2007) (Additional Charge)	Jammu and Kashmir	8 May 1990	16 March 1991^{[‡]}	312 days	Ramaswamy Venkataraman
5		Lokanath Misra (1921–2009) (Additional Charge)	Orissa	17 March 1991	25 March 1991	8 days	Ramaswamy Venkataraman
6		Surendranath Dwivedy (1913–2001)	Orissa	26 March 1991	4 July 1993^{[‡]}	2 years, 100 days	Ramaswamy Venkataraman
7		Madhukar Dighe (1920–2014) (Additional Charge)	Uttar Pradesh	4 July 1993	20 October 1993	108 days	Shankar Dayal Sharma
8		Mata Prasad (1925–2021)	Uttar Pradesh	20 October 1993	16 May 1999	5 years, 208 days	Shankar Dayal Sharma
9		Lieutenant General; Srinivas Kumar Sinha (Retd); PVSM ADC (1928- 2016)(Additional Charge)	Bihar	16 May 1999	1 August 1999	77 days	K. R. Narayanan
10		Arvind Dave; IPS (Retd) (born 1940)	Uttar Pradesh	1 August 1999	12 June 2003^{[§]} (Note: Transferred as the Governor of Manipur)	3 years, 315 days	K. R. Narayanan
11		Vinod Chandra Pande; IAS (Retd) (1938–2005)	Uttar Pradesh	12 June 2003	15 December 2004	1 year, 186 days	A. P. J. Abdul Kalam
12		Shilendra Kumar Singh; IFS (Retd) (1932–2009)	Delhi	16 December 2004	23 January 2007	2 years, 38 days	A. P. J. Abdul Kalam
13		M. M. Jacob (1926- 2018) (Acting)	Kerala	24 January 2007	6 April 2007	72 days	A. P. J. Abdul Kalam
14		Kateekal Sankaranarayanan(1932- 2022) (Acting)	Kerala	7 April 2007	14 April 2007	7 days	A. P. J. Abdul Kalam
(12)		Shilendra Kumar Singh; IFS (Retd) (1932–2009)	Delhi	15 April 2007	3 September 2007^{[§]} (Note: Transferred as the Governor of Rajasthan)	141 days	A. P. J. Abdul Kalam
(14)		Kateekal Sankaranarayanan (1932- 2022) (Acting)	Kerala	4 September 2007	26 January 2008	144 days	Pratibha Patil
15		General; Joginder Jaswant Singh (Retd); PVSM AVSM VSM ADC (born 1945)	Punjab	26 January 2008	28 May 2013	5 years, 122 days	Pratibha Patil
16		Lieutenant General; Nirbhay Sharma (Retd); PVSM UYSM AVSM VSM (born 1946)	Uttar Pradesh	28 May 2013	31 May 2015^{[§]} (Note: Transferred as the Governor of Mizoram)	2 years, 3 days	Pranab Mukherjee
17		Jyoti Prasad Rajkhowa; IAS (Retd) (born 1944)	Assam	1 June 2015	9 July 2016	1 year, 38 days	Pranab Mukherjee
18		Tathagata Roy (born 1945) (Acting)	West Bengal	10 July 2016	12 August 2016	33 days	Pranab Mukherjee
(17)		Jyoti Prasad Rajkhowa; IAS (Retd) (born 1944)	Assam	13 August 2016	13 September 2016^{[‡]}	31 days	Pranab Mukherjee
19		V. Shanmuganathan (born 1949) (Additional Charge)	Tamil Nadu	14 September 2016	27 January 2017^{[‡]}	135 days	Pranab Mukherjee
20		Padmanabha Balakrishna Acharya (1931- 2023) (Additional charge)	Karnataka	28 January 2017	2 October 2017	247 days	Pranab Mukherjee
21		Brigadier; B. D. Mishra (Retd) (born 1939)	Uttar Pradesh	3 October 2017	15 February 2023^{[‡]} (Note: Resigned to become the Lieutenant Governor of Ladakh)	5 years, 135 days	Ram Nath Kovind
22		Lieutenant General; Kaiwalya Trivikram Parnaik (Retd); PVSM UYSM YSM (born 1953)	Maharashtra	16 February 2023	Incumbent	3 years, 239 days	Droupadi Murmu

== Oath ==
“I, A. B., do swear in the name of God/solemly affirm that I will faithfully execute the office of Governor (or discharge the functions of the Governor) of .............(name of the State) and will to the best of my ability preserve, protect and defend the Constitution and the law and that I will devote myself to the service and well-being of the people of ..………(name of the State).”
