= Stock market crashes in India =

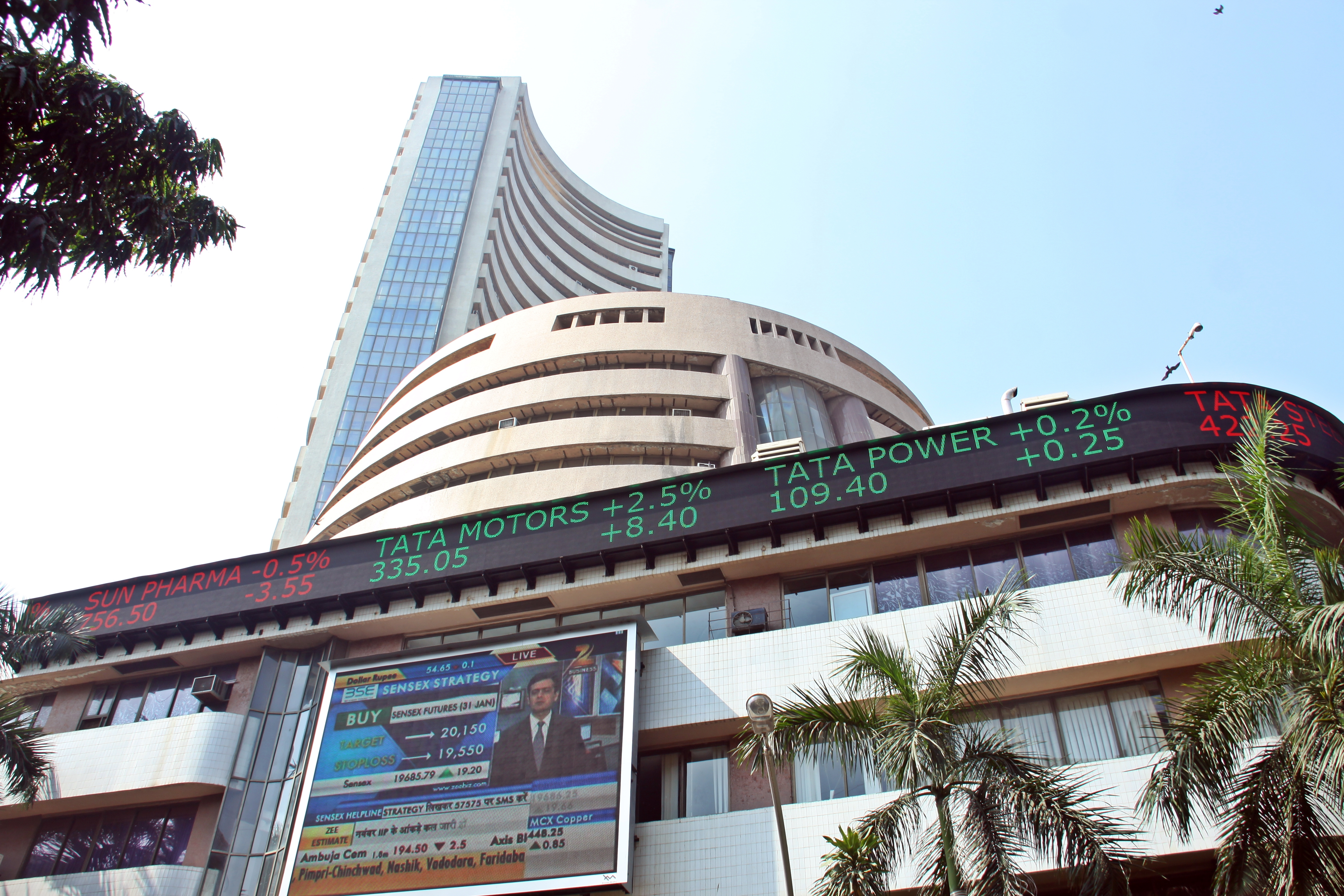
Bombay Stock Exchange

Since the beginning of the Bombay stock exchange, stock markets in India, particularly the Bombay Stock Exchange and National Stock Exchange of India have seen a number of booms as well as crashes.

This page lists these crashes and sharp falls in the two primary Indian stock markets, namely the BSE and NSE. Financial Times terms a double-digit percentage fall in the stock markets over five minutes as a crash, while Jayadev et al. describe a stock market crash in India as a "fall in the NIFTY of more than 10% within a span of 20 days" or "difference of more than 10% between the high on a day and the low on the next trading day" or "decline in the NIFTY of more than 9% within a span of 5 days". As per the latter definition, the Nifty experienced 15 crashes during the period 2000 to 2008 with a number of them having occurred in the months of January, May and June 2008. According to SEBI, approximately 89% of individual stock traders in the equity Futures & Options (F&O) segment incurred losses during the financial year 2021–22.

== The crash of 1865 ==
As per the Business Standard, India experienced its first stock market crash in 1865. Although the Bombay stock exchange had not yet been formed, Gujarati and Parsi traders often traded shares mutually at the junction of Rampart row and Meadows Street. In the preceding years, speculation about the results of the American Civil War had led to irrational increases of stocks of new Indian companies. Shares of the Back Bay reclamation (face value Rs. 5,000) touched Rs. 50,000 and those of Bank of Bombay (face value Rs. 50000000) touched Rs. 29,00,050. Money made from cotton was pumped into the stock market driving prices of stocks higher. Banks loaned money to speculators further fueling the bull run and wealthy merchants like Premchand Roychand dispensed advice that led to ordinary people placing their bets on shares.

On 16 November 1864, the governor warned civil servants not to participate in the current frenzy. New companies were floated with new share issues publicized in the newspapers. Forward contracts further promoted speculative purchases. However, the market crashed in May 1865 when the civil war ended, causing cotton prices to fall. Shares of the Backbay reclamation fell by 96% to under Rs. 2,00,000 and a number of merchants including Behramji Hormuzjee Cama went bankrupt. The crash not only led to a dwindling of the financial fortunes of many, it also led to a decrease of the city's population by 21% due to the closing down of many enterprises. On 1 July 1865, when hundreds of "time bargains" had matured (as the future contracts were then known), buyers and sellers alike defaulted leading to the burst of the bubble. A share of Bank of Bombay which had touched Rs 2,850 at the peak of the market slumped to just Rs 87 in the aftermath of the bust.

== Crash of 1982 ==
In 1982, the bear cartel of Bengal started short selling shares targeted primarily of Reliance. Stocks around 110,0000 was short sold. The value of shares decreased significantly. The BSE was shut down for three consecutive days.

== Crash of 1991 ==
After economic liberalization in India in 1991, the stock market saw a number of cycles of booms and busts, some related to scams such as those engineered by players such as Harshad Mehta and Ketan Parekh, some due to global events and a few due to circular trading, rigging of prices and the irrational exuberance of investors leading to bubbles that finally burst.

== Crash of 1992 ==
On 28 April 1992, the BSE experienced a fall of 12.77% – due to the Harshad Mehta Scam.

== UPA 1 election crash of 2004 ==
On 17 May 2004, the BSE fell 15.52% – its largest fall in history (in terms of percentage).

== Crash of 2006 ==
On 18 May 2006, the BSE Sensex fell by 826 points to 11,391.

== Crashes of 2007 ==
During the 2008 financial crisis, the stock markets in India fell on several occasions in 2007 as well as 2008. In 2007, there were five sharp falls in the stock markets.

- 2 April 2007: The Sensex fell by 617 points to 12,455 though during the course of the day, it fell further. As per the analysts at Rediff, "The Sensex opened with a huge negative gap of 260 points at 12,812 following the Reserve Bank of India [Get Quote] decision to hike the cash reserve ratio and repo rate. Unabated selling, mainly in auto and banking stocks, saw the index drift to lower levels as the day progressed. The index tumbled to a low of 12,426 before finally settling with a nifty loss of 617 points (4.7%) at 12,455".
- 1 August 2007: The Sensex continued to fall and finally settled at 14,936 while the nifty fell by 183 points to 4,346. As per Rediff, "The Sensex opened with a negative gap of 207 points at 15,344 amid weak trends in the global market and slipped deeper into the red. Unabated selling across-the-board saw the index tumble to a low of 14,911. The Sensex finally ended with a nifty loss of 615 points at 14,936. The NSE Nifty ended at 4,346, down 183 points. This was the third biggest loss in absolute terms for the index (thus far)".
- 16 August 2007: The Sensex continue to languish a good 500 points down for most of the trading session, finally closing at a low of 14,358, a loss of 643 points.
- 18 October 2007: While activity remained normal in the morning, during noon trades, the Sensex tumbled down as the intensity of selling increased towards the closing bell of the BSE. The Sensex tumbled all the way to a low of 17,771 – down 1,428 points from the same day's high. It finally settled on 17,998 with a loss of 717 points (3.8%). The Nifty too lost 208 points and closed at 5,351.
- 21 November 2007: Trying to explain the fall, Rediff recounted that "Mirroring weakness in other Asian markets, the Sensex saw relentless selling." The index tumbled to a new low of 18,515 – down 766 points from the previous day's close. It finally ended with a loss of 678 points at 18,603. The Nifty also lost 220 points to close at 5,561.
- 17 December 2007: As per Rediff, "Again, a heavy bout of selling in the late noon deals saw the BSE Sensex plunge to a low of 19,177 – down 856 points from the day's open. The Sensex finally closed at 19,261 – a fall of 769 points (3.8%). The NSE Nifty 50 ended at 5,777, down 271 points".

== Crashes of 2008 ==
- on 21 Jan 2008, the BSE fell by 1,408 points to 17,605 leading to one of the largest erosions in investor wealth. The BSE stopped trading for a while at 2:30 pm due to a technical snag although its circuit filter allows swings of up to 15% before stopping trading for an hour. Referred to in the media as "Black Monday", the fall was blamed by analysts at HSBC mutual fund and JP Morgan on a large variety of reasons including change in the global investment climate, fears of United States' economy going into a recession, FIIs and foreign hedge funds selling in order to reallocate their funds from risky emerging markets to stable developed markets, a cut in US interest rates, global bourses (often referred to as event related volatility), volatility in commodities markets, a combination of global and local factors ("...other emerging markets were down nearly 20% so India is playing catch-up..."), huge build-ups in derivatives positions leading to margin calls and that many IPOs had sucked out liquidity from the primary market into the secondary market. HSBC mutual funds analysts predicted further falls in the stock market, and the analysts at JP Morgan were of the opinion that market would fall a further 10–15%.
- On the next day on 22 January 2008, the Sensex again fell by 875 points to 16,729. 22 Jan 2008: The Sensex saw its biggest intra-day fall on Tuesday when it hit a low of 15,332, down 2,273 points. However, it recovered losses and closed at a loss of 875 points at 16,730. The Nifty closed at 4,899 at a loss of 310 points. Trading was suspended for one hour at the Bombay Stock Exchange after the benchmark Sensex crashed to a low of 15,576.30 within minutes of opening, crossing the circuit limit of 10 per cent.
- On 11 Feb 2008, the Sensex fell by a further 834 points to 16,630.
- On 3 March 2008, the Sensex fell by 900 points to settle at 16,677.
- On 17 March 2008, the BSE Sensex fell further to

14,809 – a fall of 951 points.

- On 24 October 2008, the BSE Sensex fell to 8701, a fall of 1070 points in a single day.
- On 26 November 2008, the Sensex continue to fall, in the bargain (as per the financial newspaper Livemint) "...dashing middle class dreams". Analysts at Livemint and Ajmera associates, Anagram capital and Ace financial services ascribed a number of reasons for this, ranging from large sales by foreign institutional investors (FII), withdrawal of money by the insurance sector. They all felt that the Sensex could rise by at the most 20–30% in 2009, from its them level of 9000 points.

== Crashes 2015 ==
- On 6 January 2015, the Sensex fell by 854 points to 26,987.
- On 24 August 2015, the BSE Sensex crashed by 1,624 points and the NSE fell by 490 points. Finally the indices closed at 25,741 points and the Nifty to 7,809 points. The reason given for this crash was given as a ripple effect due to fears over a slowdown in China, as the Yuan had been devalued two weeks ago leading to a fall in the currency rates of other currencies and the rapid selling of stocks in China and India. The Shanghai stock exchange too fell by 8.5%. A variety of other reasons too were given for this fall by analysts including disappointing earnings in the first quarter for many Indian companies, somber commentaries by their management leading to doubts regarding their recovery and a below average monsoon for that year.

== Crashes of 2016 ==
The stock markets in India continued to fall in 2016. By 16 February 2016, the BSE had seen a fall of 26% over the past eleven months, losing 1607 points in four consecutive days of February. The reasons given for this included NPAs of Indian banks, "global weaknesses" and "global factors". In the four months from November 2015 to February 2016, FIIs were reported to have sold equities worth Rs 17,318 crore as, in the opinion of analysts, concerns grew over growth in China and as crude oil prices tumbled below $30 per barrel

On 9 November 2016, crashed by 1689 points, believed by analysts to be due to the crackdown on black money by the Indian government, resulting in frantic selling. The Sensex nosedived by 6% to 26,902 and the Nifty dropped by 541 points to 8002. These were said to be due to the demonetization drive by the Modi government. The Hindu was of the opinion that the weakening rupee and the US presidential election too had some bearing on the behavior of investors. The fall was concurrent with falls in other Asian stock markets including the Hang Seng, Nikkei and the Shanghai Composite. The S&P had also fallen by 4.45%.

== Crashes of 2018 ==
- Although not classified as a crash, the BSE and NSE fell sharply on 2 and 5 February 2018, sparked by the comments of the Finance minister's proposal in the budget speech to introduce a 10% long term capital gains tax (LTCG) on equity shares sold after 12 months. The BSE Sensex fell by 600 points in two days, and the Nifty 50 fell by about 400 points to 10,676 on 5th. Earlier, the BSE Sensex had fallen by 570 points to 35,328 on 2 February and the NSE Nifty by 190 points to a low of 10,826.

== Crashes of 2020 ==
On 1 February 2020, as the FY 2020–21 Union budget was presented in the lower house of the Indian parliament, Nifty fell by over 3% (373.95 points) while Sensex fell by more than 2% (987.96 points). The fall was also weighed by the global breakdown amid coronavirus pandemic centered in China.

On 28 February 2020, Sensex lost 1,448 points and Nifty fell by 432 points due to growing global tension caused by COVID-19 pandemic, which W.H.O said has a pandemic potential. Both BSE and NSE fell for the entire five days of the week ending with the worst weekly fall since 2009

On 4 and 6 March, markets fell by around 1000 points and several crores of wealth was wiped out. On 6 March 2020, Yes Bank was taken over by RBI under its management for reconstruction and will be merged with SBI. This was done to ensure smooth functioning of the bank as it was struggling for couple of years to cope up with heavy pressure due to cleaning of bad loans.

On 9 March 2020, the Sensex fell by 1,941.67 points, while Nifty-50 broke down by 538 points. The fear of COVID-19 outbreak has created havoc all over the globe and India is no exception. Further, the recent Yes Bank crisis also made the markets fell. The markets ended in red with Sensex closing on 35,634.95 and Nifty-50 on 10,451.45.

On 12 March 2020, the Sensex fell by 2,919.26 points (−8.18%), the worst continuation of the week in the history while Nifty-50 broke down by 868.2 points (−8.30%) amid World Health Organization (WHO) declaring Coronavirus outbreak as "pandemic". Sensex ended to 33-month low of 32778.14.

On 16 March 2020, Sensex plunged by 2,713.41 points (around 8%), the second worst fall in its history. On the other hand, Nifty ended below 9200–mark at 9,197.40 due to global economic recession.

However, the Sensex continued to fall straight for four–continuous days till 19 March 2020, losing 5815 points during the period.

On 23 March 2020, Sensex lost 3,934.72 points (13.15%) and Nifty plunges 1,135 points (12.98%) at 7610.25 as coronavirus-led lockdowns across the world triggered fears of a recession. These are now the lowest levels since 2016. It's witnessing the biggest weekly loss since October 2008, as the increasing number of coronavirus cases in India as well as globally.

== Crash of 2024 ==
After the 2024 general election, stocks crashed. Nifty fell from 23,263.90 on 3 June to 21,884.50 on 4 June (a crash of around 1380 points (5.93% decline) but had recovered to 24141.95 by 1 July. "Speaking on Nifty's remarkable monthly performance post-Lok Sabha elections, Sugandha Sachdeva, Founder of SS WealthStreet, said, "Nifty has posted impressive returns of over 11% one month after the election outcome, significantly surpassing gains seen in previous election years dating back to 1999. After experiencing a sharp decline on the election day, the benchmark index quickly recovered and surged to new record highs of 24401, rewarding investors with substantial returns." The primary reason for the significant market downturn was the unexpected outcome of the 2024 general election. While many anticipated that the Bharatiya Janata Party (BJP) would secure over 400 seats, as suggested by exit polls, the actual results were markedly different, with the BJP winning approximately 240 seats. This discrepancy contributed to the most substantial market crash in the past four years.

However, The Indian stock market has witnessed a drastic fall since the Sensex touched an all-time high of Rs 85,978.84 on 27 September last year with large-cap stocks leading the downslide. The benchmark index has plummeted by a whopping 10,000 points, or 11.79 per cent, over the past four months, marking a stark reversal of fortunes and leaving investors shaken and grappling with substantial losses. The NSE Nifty Index has also taken a hit, falling by 12.38 per cent during the same period. Large cap stocks took the maximum hit as foreign investors sold heavily, leading to a 13.27 per cent fall in NSE large-cap index in four months. The sell-off has been widespread, affecting large, medium, and small capital companies across the board – the NSE Mid-cap index has dropped by 13.58 per cent, NSE Nifty Next 50 has dropped by 20.99 per cent while the small-cap index has tanked by 12.80 per cent.

== Crash of 2025 ==
The 2025 Indian stock market crash was a major financial downturn that saw sharp declines in key indices, investor panic, and economic uncertainty. It followed a strong market rally in 2024 but was triggered by global economic concerns, foreign investor withdrawals, and domestic challenges.

In January 2025, market indices began showing signs of weakness. By February, the Sensex had fallen by thousands of points, with a single-day drop of over 1,000 points on February 28. The Nifty also slipped below critical levels, deepening market fears.

The crash was driven by multiple factors, including global trade tensions, US economic slowdown, rising inflation, and higher interest rates. Foreign investors pulled out funds due to a stronger US dollar and better returns in developed markets. Domestically, inflation, unemployment, and policy uncertainties worsened the situation. Sectors like IT and financial services were among the worst hit.

In response, the Reserve Bank of India intervened to stabilize the rupee, while SEBI imposed restrictions to curb excessive volatility. The government considered stimulus measures to restore confidence.

The crash impacted corporate earnings, banking stability, and retail investors, leading to weaker consumer sentiment.

The crash had a disproportionate impact on various sectors of the Indian economy. The financial services sector, previously buoyed by robust credit growth and digital lending, saw sharp declines as investor sentiment soured. Despite a brief rebound in March 2025—largely driven by attractive valuations and foreign portfolio investor (FPI) interest—financial stocks remained volatile. The Nifty Financial Services Index rose approximately 9% in March, but analysts warned that the recovery was fragile due to underlying macroeconomic headwinds.

The information technology sector also faced significant setbacks. Global tech spending declined amid recession fears in the United States and Europe, which are major markets for Indian IT services exports. Several large-cap IT firms issued profit warnings, leading to a sell-off in the sector.

The automobile industry experienced a dual shock. Domestically, high inflation and elevated interest rates reduced consumer demand for passenger and commercial vehicles. Internationally, supply chain disruptions—exacerbated by new U.S. tariffs on Chinese auto components—led to production delays and cost escalations. The compounded pressure triggered stock price declines across major auto manufacturers.

The global economic environment in early 2025 was marked by heightened uncertainty. The United States, under a new presidential administration, reintroduced a range of tariffs on Chinese goods, including electronics, automotive parts, and semiconductors. These protectionist measures triggered a broader deterioration in global trade relations, leading to retaliatory actions by China and other affected nations. This contributed to a fall in global stock markets and heightened risk aversion among investors.

The escalation of trade tensions particularly affected export-dependent economies such as India. As global demand weakened, India’s merchandise exports declined in key sectors such as textiles, chemicals, and engineering goods. Investor confidence was further shaken by fears of a global slowdown, especially after the U.S. Federal Reserve signaled a prolonged high-interest-rate regime to tackle persistent inflation.

The Indian rupee depreciated sharply during the crash period. On April 3, 2025, the rupee opened at 85.70–85.75 per U.S. dollar, compared to 85.49 in the previous session. The weakening currency was influenced by both domestic inflation and capital outflows. FPIs pulled out over ₹61,000 crore (approximately $7.3 billion) from Indian equities between January and March 2025.

One key reason for the FPI exit was the strengthening U.S. dollar and higher yields in U.S. treasuries, which made American assets more attractive. Emerging markets like India were particularly vulnerable, with global investors reallocating capital away from riskier assets.

In an attempt to stabilize markets, the Reserve Bank of India (RBI) engaged in open market operations and intervened in the foreign exchange markets to curb the rupee's volatility. Additionally, the central bank maintained a cautious monetary stance but signaled that rate cuts could be considered if inflation came under control.

The Securities and Exchange Board of India (SEBI) imposed temporary restrictions on short selling and increased margin requirements in order to reduce speculative activity. The government convened emergency meetings to explore fiscal stimulus options, including infrastructure spending and targeted subsidies to revive consumption.

Despite the sharp downturn, there were signs of recovery by the end of March 2025. Indian equity benchmarks gained nearly 7% during the month. Some sectors—particularly banking and infrastructure—saw renewed interest from domestic institutional investors and select FPIs.

Market analysts forecasted that the Sensex could reach 78,500 by mid-2025 and 80,850 by year-end. However, this remained below the record high of 85,978 set in September 2024. The broader recovery was expected to be gradual and uneven across sectors.

== Stock market performance: Chart analysis ==
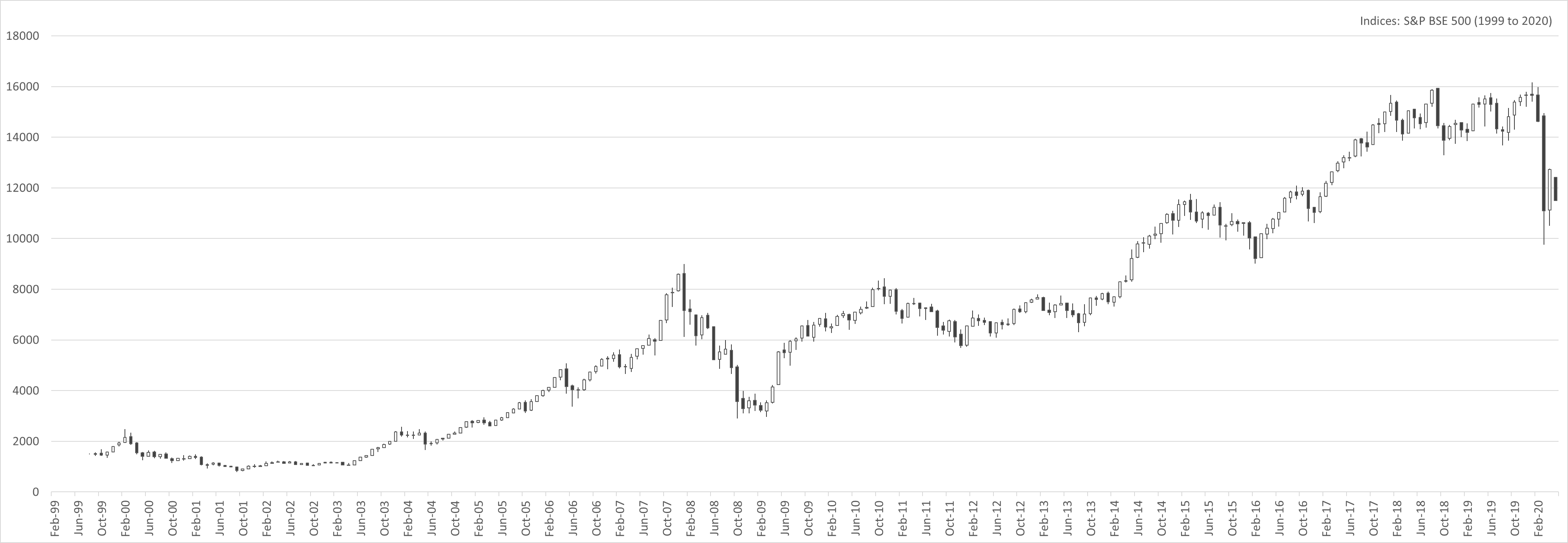
Indian stock market indices S&P BSE 500 (1999 to 2020)

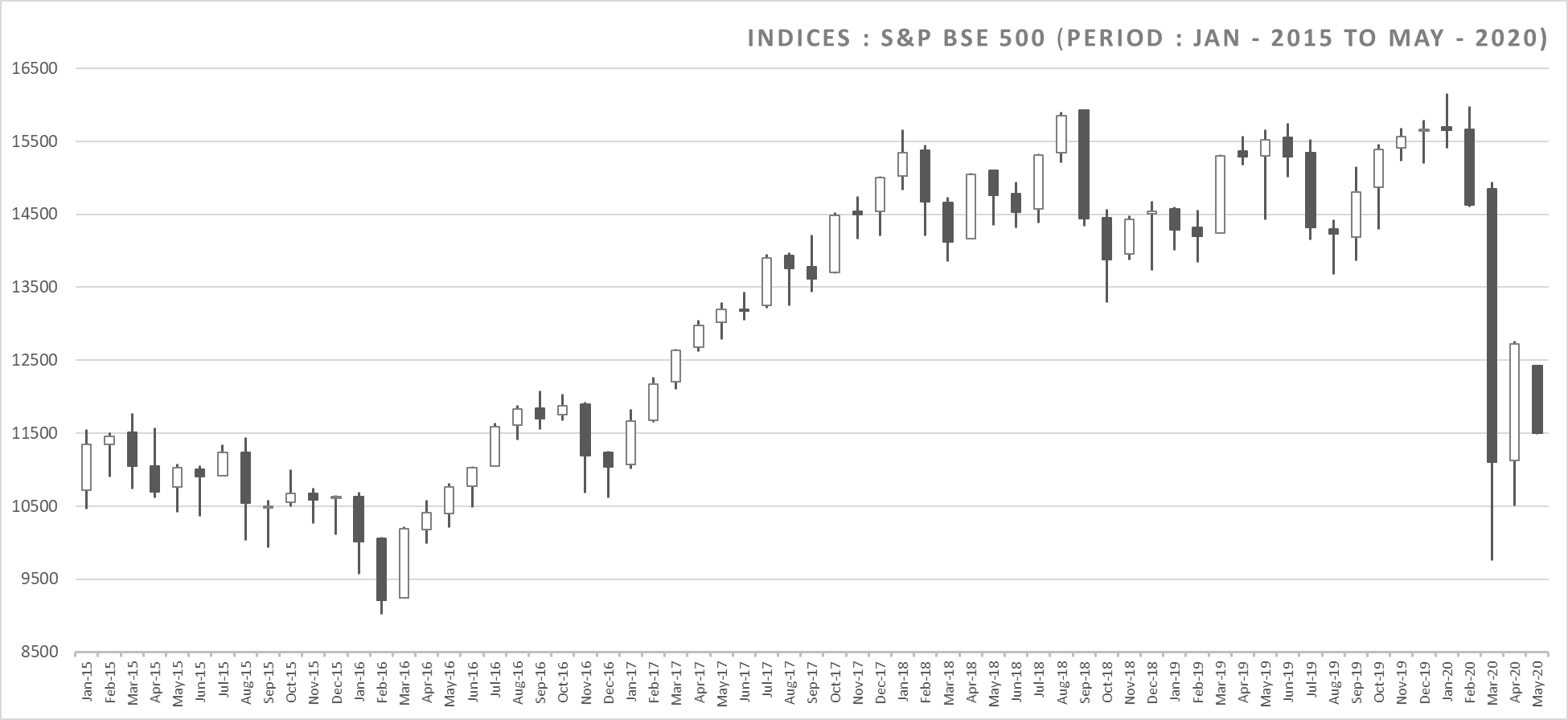
Indices: S&P BSE 500 (Period Jan – 2015 to May – 2020). Open, High, Low, Close visible. Fall depicted in black. Rise depicted in white.

Chart of S&P BSE SENSEX monthly data from January 1991 to May 2013.

== See also ==
- Harshad Mehta
- Ketan Parekh
- List of stock market crashes and bear markets
- Mutual funds in India
- Market manipulation
- Risk management
- Financial risk management
- Insider trading
- Trading day
- Stock market bubble
- Asset allocation
- Diversification (finance)
- 1992 Indian stock market scam
- Dot-com bubble
- 2020 stock market crash
- Black Monday (1987)
- Wall Street crash of 1929
- 2010 flash crash
- 2008 financial crisis
- 2015–2016 Chinese stock market turbulence
- Securities and Exchange Board of India
