= 2001 in India =

- Centuries: 19th; 20th; 21st
- Decades: 1980s; 1990s; 2000s; 2010s; 2020s
- See also: List of years in India; Timeline of Indian history

Events in the year 2001 in the Republic of India.

== Incumbents ==
- President of India – K. R. Narayanan
- Prime Minister of India – Atal Bihari Vajpayee
- Vice President of India – Krishna Kant
- Chief Justice of India – Adarsh Sein Anand until 10 January, Sam Piroj Bharucha

=== Governors ===
- Andhra Pradesh – C. Rangarajan
- Arunachal Pradesh – Arvind Dave
- Assam – Srinivas Kumar Sinha
- Bihar – V. C. Pande
- Chhattisgarh – D. N. Sahay
- Goa – Mohammed Fazal
- Gujarat – Sunder Singh Bhandari
- Haryana – Babu Parmanand
- Himachal Pradesh – Suraj Bhan
- Jharkhand – Prabhat Kumar
- Jammu and Kashmir – Girish Chandra Saxena
- Karnataka – V. S. Ramadevi
- Kerala – Sukhdev Singh Kang
- Madhya Pradesh – Bhai Mahavir
- Maharashtra – P.C. Alexander
- Manipur – Ved Marwah
- Meghalaya – M.M. Jacob
- Mizoram – Ved Marwah (until 17 May), Amolak Rattan Kohli (starting 17 May)
- Nagaland – Om Prakash Sharma
- Odisha – M. M. Rajendran
- Punjab – J. F. R. Jacob
- Rajasthan – Anshuman Singh
- Sikkim – Chaudhary Randhir Singh (until 17 May), Kidar Nath Sahani (starting 17 May)
- Tamil Nadu – M. Fathima Beevi (until 2 July), C. Rangarajan (starting 2 July)
- Tripura – Krishna Mohan Seth
- Uttar Pradesh – Vishnu Kant Shastri
- Uttarakhand – Surjit Singh Barnala
- West Bengal – Viren J. Shah

== Events ==
- National income - ₹23,152,430 million

=== January ===
- 1 January – Calcutta officially becomes Kolkata, reverting to its precolonial name.
- 1 January Dr. Leo Rebello's Encyclopedia of Letters Pen Power and All India Letter Writers Association is entered as a World Record in the Limca Book of Records.
- 2 January – Power cuts leave huge swathes of northern India in darkness for two days starting early on 2 January. A minor fault in Uttar Pradesh leads to a breakdown in the regional grid across Haryana, Himachal Pradesh, Kashmir, Punjab, and Rajasthan.
- Early January – The government announces that it aims to double the number of aircraft operated by Air India in the next five to seven years as well as to sell off a 60% share in the company. Air India's stock of aging craft is thought to have dulled the company's competitive edge in recent years.
- Early January – The president of the Indian Science Congress, R.S. Paroda, warns a conference of 3,000 Indian scientists that the country could face a severe food shortage in 2020 as the population size outstrips the country's level of supplies.
- 4 January – The government tests its first homemade jet fighter, the Light Combat Aircraft (LCA). The plane, originally scheduled to take its maiden flight in 1991, has taken 17 years to develop and will not be ready for service until 2010.
- 9 January-21 February – More than 100 million people – almost 2% of the world's population – attend the Maha Kumbh Mela festival in Allahabad, making it the largest gathering of human beings in history. On the festival's most important day an estimated 20 million Hindu pilgrims bathe in the sacred waters of the three rivers which meet near the town. The festival is held every 12 years.
- 15 January – Voters in Indian-administered Kashmir are able to participate in the first local elections in 23 years. The polls decide positions on some 125 village councils. Islamic militants have urged a boycott of the vote, which they say will undermine the separatist movement.
- 15 January – In a sign of improving relations, Prime Minister Atal Bihari Vajpayee meets with the visiting chairman of China's National People's Congress, Li Peng. Both leaders say they have made substantial progress in discussing their two countries' disputed borders.
- 16 January- 11 people are killed when six members of the Kashmiri separatist guerrilla group Lashkar-e-Toiba attempt to storm Srinagar's civilian airport.
- Mid-January – The government announces that it is willing to meet the United Liberation Front of Assam (ULFA) for open negotiations on ending the 20-year insurgency in the northeastern state.
- Mid-January – The eastern state of Orissa urges further government assistance in the face of a major drought. Officials estimate that the state has lost around $150.7 million in failed rice crops alone. It is thought that deforestation has played a major part in the drought.
- 17 January – Pakistan reacts angrily to news that the Indian military has successfully test-fired an improved Agni-II intermediate ballistic missile capable of carrying a nuclear warhead to anywhere in Pakistan.
- Mid-January – Researchers reveal that unusually high sea temperatures caused by the extreme weather effect known as El Niño have irreversibly damaged coral reefs off India's western coast.
- Late January – 150 million children across India are immunized against polio in one of the largest vaccination projects ever undertaken.
- Late January – The government extends its ceasefire in Kashmir for another month despite continuing separatist violence.
- 26 January – The 7.7 M_{w} Gujarat earthquake shakes Western India with a maximum Mercalli intensity of X (Extreme), leaving 13,805–20,023 dead and about 166,800 injured.
- Late January – The UK-based human rights group Amnesty International urges the government to crack down on the widespread use of torture by police.
- Late January- Researchers in Bangalore announce that the common antibiotic Triclosan has significant effects against the malaria parasite. Malaria is thought to kill around 1 million people every year worldwide.

=== February ===
- Early February – Authorities and aid workers in Gujarat warn that disease is now the biggest problem threatening the 1 million people made homeless by the January earthquake. Fears of a major epidemic are increased as the thousands of corpses still trapped beneath fallen buildings begin to decompose.
- Early February – The government grants refugee status to Ogyen Trinley Dorje, a controversial claimant to the 17th Karmapa title. The Karmapa was in India since escaping Tibet in early 2000.
- 2 February – An unprecedented telephone conversation between Prime Minister Vajpayee and Pakistani military leader General Pervez Musharraf is hailed as a major step in relations between the two countries. Musharraf contacts his Indian counterpart to offer further emergency aid for the survivors of the Gujarat earthquake.
- Early February – The drug manufacturer Cipla, based in Mumbai, announces that it plans to offer anti-AIDS drugs at very low prices. The three-drug cocktail used to help AIDS victims currently costs around $12,000 per patient per year. Cipla says it will offer a three-tier pricing structure with wholesalers paying $1,200, governments $600, and the French charity Médecins sans Frontières just $350 per patient per year.
- Mid-February – In a sign of thawing relations, Foreign Minister Jaswant Singh begins an official visit to Myanmar. He is the first Indian minister to go to the country since the military junta came to power there in 1988.
- Mid-February – Violent protests by Kashmiri separatists in Srinagar intensify. Five Indian policemen are killed on 19 February alone in riots sparked by the death of four stone-throwing demonstrators killed by police in Haigam, 40 km north of Srinagar, four days earlier.
- 21 February – A study conducted by Centre for Science and Environment in Enmakaje, Kasaragod district, Kerala brings out Endosulfan tragedy in Kerala.
- Late February – The government extends its ceasefire in separatist Kashmir for an extra three months.
- Late February – A unilateral 15-day ceasefire is declared by the government in the far northeastern separatist state of Manipur. The cessation of hostilities will begin on 1 March to coincide with the start of the local Yaosang festival.

=== March ===
- 1 March - As per 2001 Census of India, India becomes the second nation in the world to register one billion people in its population. The first was China in 1979.
- 13 March - Tehelka broke its sting operation story of Operation West End.
- 15 March – Defense Minister George Fernandes resigns in a bribery scandal which threatens to bring down the government. The leader of the ruling Bharatiya Janata Party (BJP), Bangaru Laxman, has already left his position, but the departures fail to calm opposition parties, who continue to stall the workings of parliament for a third day on 16 March. Journalists released secretly filmed footage on the Internet, showing government members from the defense ministry and other senior figures accepting bribes from bogus arms dealers.
- 23 March - Madhavpura Mercantile Cooperative Bank - Ketan Parekh scam.
- 28 March – A counter-insurgency Special Operations Group (SOG) patrol claims to have killed Salaudin Ayubi, the Pakistani-based Lashkar-e-Toiba's leader in the Kashmir valley, in a shootout near Srinagar. There has been a spate of attacks by militants in Srinagar in recent months, although the ceasefire announced by the Indian government in November remains nominally in place.

=== April ===
- Beginning of April – Widespread strike action by private owners of buses, taxis, and motorized rickshaws contributes to chaotic traffic conditions in Delhi, as new rules come into force requiring a switch from diesel fuel to compressed natural gas in a bid to combat urban air pollution.
- Early April – Customs and excise chief B.P. Verma is arrested on charges of corruption.
- 2 April-4 April – A conference in Delhi, organized under the UN Environment Programme's Convention on International Trade in Endangered Species (CITES), brings together for the first time the members of a new task force on the future of tigers in the wild – thought to number 5,000–7,000 in total.
- Early April – In a bold attempt to hasten an end to violence in separatist Kashmir, the government offers unconditional peace talks to Kashmiri militants. However, with no invitation to the Pakistani authorities it is not likely to attract much response from the separatists.
- Early April – The Tibetan spiritual leader, the 14th Dalai Lama Tenzin Gyatso, welcomes news that tens of thousands of Dalits (lower-caste Hindus) are to convert to Buddhism on 14 October.
- Early April – Tea production in the northeastern region of Darjeeling is adversely affected by an indefinite general strike called by the Gorkha National Liberation Front (GNLF) over the government's failure to identify the perpetrators of an attack on their leader, Subhas Ghising.
- Mid-April – Extra troops are dispatched to the Bangladeshi border after 18 soldiers are killed in escalating shooting incidents. Tension in the region has mounted over a disputed section of the border south of Assam.
- Mid-April – Opposition parties recommence the disruption of parliament in an attempt to force the government to launch an investigation into an allegedly corrupt arms deal.
- 18 April – The country's space program is brought into a new era with the successful test launch of its geostationary satellite launch vehicle, the GSLV-D1, at Sriharikota in Andhra Pradesh. The program had caused embarrassment for the country's space agency in late March when the first test launch, broadcast live on television, was aborted as flames burst from the craft on ignition. Communications satellites launched in India have hitherto been propelled by Arianespace or Russian rockets, and the GSLV-D1 is planned as a less costly alternative.
- 22 April – The U.S.-based current affairs magazine TIME apologizes emphatically for the offense caused by the printing of a depiction of Muhammad – considered a blasphemy in Islam – which had sparked large riots in Kashmir the previous day.
- 22 April – The government is outraged when medical reports suggest that many of the 16 soldiers killed by Bangladeshi forces in border skirmishes were mutilated and tortured before being murdered.

=== May ===
- 1 May – The number of Tibetan children under the age of 13 crossing the Himalayas to enter India doubled to 1,500 in the first four months of the year according to the Reception Centre for Tibetan Refugees.
- Early May – Ten people are killed in pre-electoral clashes in the northeastern state of Assam as the outlawed separatist United Liberation Front of Asom (ULFA) clashes with soldiers. State elections are to be held on 10 May.
- Early May – Parliamentary Affairs Minister Pramod Mahajan announces that the government will open up the country's arms production industry to private investors, including up to 26% to foreign capital.
- Mid-May – The ruling BJP suffers defeat in five key state elections, losing ground to the opposition Congress (I) party in Assam, Kerala, and Pondicherry. In Tamil Nadu a coalition allied to Congress (I) sweeps to power making Jayaram Jayalalitha, a former film star with a conviction for bribery, chief minister there. In West Bengal the communist Left Front is returned to power continuing its record as the world's longest serving elected communist government.
- Mid-May – Prime Minister Vajpayee announces that India will honour the ASEAN treaty keeping Southeast Asia a nuclear weapons-free zone.
- Mid-May – Tarun Gogoi, the new Congress (I) chief minister of Assam, declares that he will press for a ceasefire with separatist rebels, but he faces opposition from the BJP-controlled federal government.
- Mid-May – Indian troops cooperate with their Myanmar counterparts in a joint offensive along their common border. Rebels from Nagaland, Manipur, and Assam are targeted.
- 24 May – The government extends an offer of talks on Kashmir to Pakistani ruler General Pervez Musharraf but ends India's six-month unilateral ceasefire in the disputed region

=== June ===
- 2 June – The federal government imposes direct rule in the northeastern state of Manipur after the state government collapsed.
- Early June – Foreign Minister Jaswant Singh signs a defense deal with Russia worth a potential $10 billion including plans to establish an air-defense system to cover the entire country and several projects to develop new aircraft.
- 6 June – Police intercept an illegal consignment of 85 human skulls near the border with eastern Nepal. The heads were apparently en route to the lucrative tourist trade in the Himalayan country and are believed to have been raided, some fairly recently, from Christian graveyards in northeast India. No smugglers are caught.
- 10 June – The Kashmiri separatist All Party Hurriyat Conference announces the suspension of all strikes and rallies in the province pending a summit between Indian and Pakistani leaders scheduled for July.
- 15 June – A plot to bomb the United States embassy in New Delhi, allegedly masterminded by the notorious Osama bin Laden, is foiled by police.
- 17 June – Thousands of demonstrators clash with police and set fire to the Manipur state legislature in Imphal. The protests are over an agreement between the government and separatist rebels from the neighbouring state of Nagaland to extend their three-year ceasefire for another year, and to widen the deal to areas beyond the state. The protestors claim that the extension will undermine regional security.
- 18 June – The government announces that Pakistani military ruler General Pervez Musharraf is expected in India on 14 July for a landmark summit with Indian leaders.
- 21 June – A deal is signed by which the world-famous Taj Mahal monument is to receive private sponsorship from the Taj Hotel Group.
- 22 June – At least 64 people die when a train plunges off a bridge in Kerala state. The following day 50 people drown in West Bengal when an overcrowded boat capsizes on the Ganges River.

=== July ===
- Early July – Police in the southern state of Tamil Nadu are ordered to shoot violent protestors on sight following unrest in the region prompted by the brief detention of the state's former chief minister Muthuvel Karunanidhi. The arrest was ordered by new chief minister Jayaram Jayalalitha, an arch-rival of Karunanidhi.
- 4 July – The country's first ever private FM radio station – Radio City – is launched in Bangalore.
- Early July – Archaeologists announce the discovery of possibly the world's second-largest Buddhist stupa (a holy domed building containing relics or artifacts associated with Buddha) in Bihar. It is believed to date from the 6th century.
- 5 July – Thousands of women clash with police in Imphal, Manipur, in protest at the federal government's negotiations with neighboring Naga rebels. The rally deliberately contravenes a curfew imposed in the city after riots in June.
- Early July – The transport ministry announces plans ahead of the India-Pakistan summit to open links with Pakistan, including across the Line of Control in Kashmir.
- First half of July – 500,000 people are displaced by severe flooding in the eastern state of Orissa.
- 13 July – Shabir Shah, the leader of the Jammu and Kashmir Democratic Party (JKDP), is arrested ahead of the landmark India-Pakistan summit in Agra.
- 17 July – Hopes for a new era in Indo-Pakistani relations are disappointed when the summit between Prime Minister Vajpayee and newly appointed Pakistani president Pervez Musharraf fails to make progress on the Kashmir issue and ends without agreement.
- 23 July – 30,000 people clash with police again in Imphal in continuing protests against the government's peace proposals with neighbouring Naga rebels.
- 25 July – Famed Bandit Queen turned M.P. Phoolan Devi is assassinated by masked gunman at the gate of her New Delhi residence at the age of 37.
- Late July – Prime Minister Vajpayee accepts the invitation from Pakistani President Musharraf to travel to Pakistan for a second round of bilateral talks. However, his acceptance comes amid reports that he has privately derided Musharraf's diplomatic skills.
- 31 July – The ruling BJP orders Prime Minister Vajpayee to remain in office, rejecting his offer to resign. Vajpayee cited difficulties in maintaining a workable coalition in government.

=== August ===
- 9 August – The security status of four districts of Jammu is changed, so that now all six districts of Jammu as well as all six districts of the Kashmir valley are designated "disturbed areas", leaving Ladakh as the only part of Jammu and Kashmir not covered by the Armed Forces (Special Powers) Act

=== September ===
- Early September – India's first police office dedicated specifically to Internet crimes opens in Bangalore.
- 21 September – J. Jayalalithaa, the controversial former film star, is forced to resign as Chief Minister of Tamil Nadu after the Supreme Court ruled her appointment was invalid due to her conviction for corruption.
- 23 September – Three-year-old U.S.-led economic sanctions against India's external defense trade are lifted as part of the U.S. attempt to bolster its regional alliances against Islamic militants. The sanctions were imposed on India and Pakistan in 1998 after they both conducted nuclear weapons tests.
- Late September – 10,000 soldiers are deployed along the border with Nepal in an effort to combat the flow of militants and criminals who are thought to use southern Nepal as a base for operations in India.
- 30 September – Madhavrao Scindia, the deputy leader of the opposition Congress (I) party, is one of eight people killed in a plane crash.

=== October ===
- 1 October – 38 people are killed in a concerted attack on Indian government buildings in Srinagar, Kashmir. A Pakistani suicide bomber from the Jaish-e-Mohammad (Army of Mohammad) detonates a government jeep packed with explosives at the entrance of the buildings, while troops disguised as policemen enter the complex and begin firing. The All-Party Hurriyat Conference of Muslim separatists and the Pakistani government both immediately condemn the attack but the Indian government accuses the Pakistani authorities of collusion.
- 2 October – Keshubhai Patel resigns his position as chief minister of Gujarat following the poor showing of his BJP in elections there. He is replaced by the BJP's general secretary, Narendra Modi.
- 2 October – U.S. Secretary of State Colin Powell suggests that Muslim Kashmiri separatists in India will be targets in the "war on terrorism".
- 7 October – Narendra Modi is sworn in as the chief minister of Gujarat.
- 8 October – Despite increased tensions after attacks in Kashmir, Prime Minister Vajpayee and Pakistani President Musharraf agree to cooperate against international terrorism in a rare telephone conversation.
- 12 October – The U.S. freezes the assets of the Pakistani-based Kashmiri separatist group Jaish-e-Mohammad as one of its targeted terrorist groups.
- 15 October – The disgraced former defence minister George Fernandes is reappointed to his post. He left the cabinet in March over a prominent corruption scandal.
- 16 October – Despite pressure from the U.S. to renew negotiations over Kashmir, the government insists that it will continue to repel incursions into Indian-administered Kashmir by rebels it says are backed by Pakistan. Indian forces began shelling positions on the Pakistani side of the Line of Control the previous day.
- 22 October – Interest rates are cut to their lowest level since 1973, falling by half a percentage point to 6.5%.
- 24 October – President K.R. Narayanan signs into law the Prevention of Terrorism Ordinance granting extra powers to the police in an effort to combat terrorism. As well as allowing the detention of suspected terrorists for up to three months without charge, the decree makes it a duty for people to report suspicious behavior.
- 26 October – Japan becomes the latest country to lift economic sanctions imposed on India and Pakistan after both countries conducted nuclear tests in 1998.

=== November ===
- 1 November – The government accuses neighboring Pakistan of provocation, saying it has been slowly increasing its military presence in Kashmir.
- 4 November – Hundreds of thousands of Dalit Hindus convert to Buddhism in one of the largest mass conversions in recent years under the leadership of Udit Raj at New Delhi.
- 6 November – Around 15,000 labourers, peasants, women, and lower caste Hindus demonstrate in New Delhi against the government's cooperation with international financial institutions, which they claim is self-destructive.
- 12 November – A strike called by groups opposed to a plan for greater representation for the ethnic Bodo people brings the state of Assam to a standstill. India's central government has proposed creating Bodo councils in regions where they form a majority of the population, but non-Bodos have raised fears that they will become the targets for racial discrimination at the hands of the new councils.
- November - Sikkim becomes the first state in India to launch online lottery, Playwin.

=== December ===
- 7 December – The government of the state of Meghalaya is toppled by a vote of no confidence. The United Democratic Party will be replaced by an opposition coalition called the People's Forum of Meghalaya.
- 13 December – 2001 Indian Parliament attack: Six gunmen injure 22 people and kill six police officers before they themselves are killed in a dramatic "suicide" attack on the central parliament buildings in New Delhi. No members of the government are hurt. The government blames the attack on two Pakistan-based Kashmiri militant groups, Jaish-e-Mohammad and Lashkar-e-Toiba, the former of which had also attacked the local government centre in Indian-administered Kashmir in October.
- Early December – The economy shows signs of a rapid slowdown as inflation strikes a 20-year low of 2.27% at the beginning of the month, falling from a 10-year high of 8.57% in February.
- Mid-December – Tension between India and Pakistan escalates rapidly after the Indian government accuses its Pakistani counterpart of supporting a terrorist attack on the Indian parliament in New Delhi. The threat of all-out war between India and Pakistan looms large across the New Year with both sides massing forces along their common border. There is an exchange of mortar fire across the "line of control", the de facto border in Kashmir, on 2 January. However, the leaders of both countries express hope that conflict could be avoided amid a massive international diplomatic effort, including a regional visit from UK Prime Minister Tony Blair. Some of the heat is released when the leadership of the groups believed to have been involved in the parliamentary attack are arrested in Pakistan and Indian Prime Minister Vajpayee announces that war is "unnecessary".

== Law ==
- The Energy Conservation Act, 2001

== Births ==
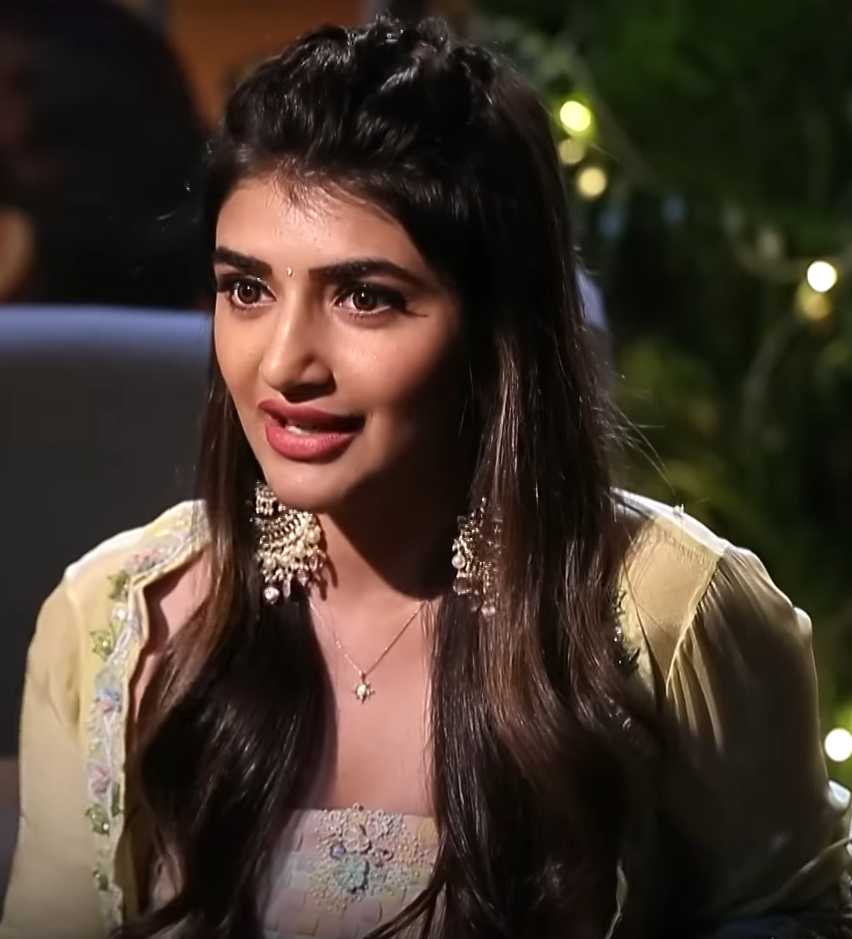
- Sreeleela
  14 June – Sreeleela, actress
- 19 June – Saloni Daini, actress
- 29 August – Jannat Zubair Rahmani, actress
- 10 November – Riyan Parag, cricketer
- 28 December – Yashasvi Jaiswal, cricketer
- 14 June - Vishhnu Yadav, Engg.

== Deaths ==
- 12 February – Bhakti Barve, actress (born 1948).
- 17 February – Chandrakant Mandare, actor and artist (born 1913).
- 13 May – R.K. Narayan, novelist (born 1906).
- 7 May － Malti Bedekar, feminist author (born 1905).
- 21 July – Sivaji Ganesan, actor (born 1927).
- 25 July – Phoolan Devi, bandit turned politician, assassinated (born 1963).
- 30 August – Kothamangalam Seenu, Tamil actor and Carnatic music singer (born 1910).
- 28 October – Pradeep Kumar, actor (born 1925).
- 5 December – Dharam Singh, field hockey player (born 1919).
- 10 December – Ashok Kumar, actor (born 1911).
- 31 December – Harshad Mehta, stockbroker (born 1954)
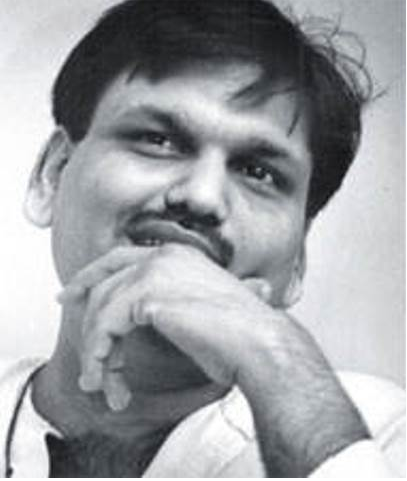
  Harshad Mehta

== See also ==
- List of Bollywood films of 2001
