= Haridas Mundhra =

Calcutta-based stock speculator

Haridas Mundhra (Hindi: हरिदास मूंदड़ा; died January 6, 2018) was a Calcutta-based stock speculator who was found guilty and imprisoned in the first big financial scandal of newly independent India in the 1950s.

The Mundhra scandal exposed the nexus between the bureaucracy, stock market speculators and small rogue businessmen. It also brought to light rifts between the then Prime Minister Jawaharlal Nehru and his son-in-law Feroze Gandhi, and led to the resignation of India's then finance minister T. T. Krishnamachari.

== Life ==
Born into a trading family with two younger brothers, Tulsi Das Mundhra and Manmohan Das Mundhra, Mundhra started life as a light-bulb salesman, and pyramided his holdings with "fast deals and stock juggling", buying shares of small companies and hiking their prices up through circular trading and rumour mongering into a Rs. 40 million (US$10 million) empire. However, by the mid-1950s, his business empire was unravelling, and he came to be known for his somewhat questionable ethics. In 1956, he was indicted by the Bombay Stock Exchange for selling forged shares.

In 1957, Mundhra got the government-owned Life Insurance Corporation (LIC) to invest Rs. 12.4 million (about US$3.2 million at the time) in the shares of six troubled companies in which Mundhra held a large number of shares which he was trying to boost by rigging the market: Richardson Cruddas, Jessops & Company, Smith Stanistreet, Osler Lamps, Agnelo Brothers and British India Corporation. The investment was done under governmental pressure and bypassed LIC's investment committee, which was informed of this decision only after the deal had gone through. In the event, LIC lost most of the money.

== Mundhra Scandal ==
The irregularity was highlighted in 1958 by Feroze Gandhi of the Indian National Congress party, who represented the Rae Bareli seat in the Parliament of India. Jawaharlal Nehru was Prime Minister at the time, and Feroze was married to his daughter Indira Gandhi. Nehru, as the leader of the ruling Congress party, wished to have the LIC matter handled quietly since it might show the government in a poor light.

However, Feroze Gandhi was the primary force behind an anti-corruption movement that in 1956 resulted in imprisonment of one of India's wealthiest men, Ram Kishan Dalmia, for defrauding his life insurance company. Subsequently, Parliament passed the Life Insurance of India Act on 19 June 1956, under which 245 firms were nationalised and consolidated under the Life Insurance Corporation. Hence, he looked upon the LIC as a "child of Parliament". He would have no softpedalling on the matter, and took the case directly to parliament:

"Parliament must exercise vigilance and control over the biggest and most powerful financial institution it has created, the Life Insurance Corporation of India, whose misapplication of public funds we shall scrutinise today." Feroze Gandhi, speech in Parliament, 1957-12-16.

The matter was dramatised further in the public mind by the tense relations between Feroze and his father-in-law.

=== Commission of Enquiry: M.C. Chagla ===
Given the public spotlight, the Indian government was forced to appoint a committee to examine the matter. The retired Bombay High Court Justice M. C. Chagla was appointed as a one-man committee. Chagla held that a transparent and public enquiry was a "very important safeguard for ensuring that the decision will be fair and impartial. The public is entitled to know on what evidence the decision is based.". Consequently, large crowds attended the hearings, which were concluded in just 24 days. Several leading stockbrokers who were on the LIC Investment Committee testified that the investment could not have been made for the purpose of propping up the market, as was claimed by the Finance Ministry, and that had the LIC consulted the Investment Committee, they would have pointed out Mundhra's forged shares episode from 1956. Among those who gave evidence was HT Parekh, then the deputy general manager of Industrial Credit & Investment Corporation of India (now ICICI Bank), who was also a member of the Investment Committee. HT Parekh's Note to the Investment Committee and his testimony is available in a two-volume collection of his writings.

Justice Chagla determined that the Finance Secretary, Haribhai M. Patel, along with two LIC officials, L S Vaidyanathan, may have colluded on the payment and should be investigated. A subsequent inquiry committee headed by Retired Justice Vivian Bose cleared the names of two civil servants but passed strictures against the finance minister for "lying". In his testimony, the Finance Minister T. T. Krishnamachari tried to distance himself from the LIC decision, implying that it may have been taken by the Finance Secretary, but Chagla held that the Minister was constitutionally responsible for his secretary's actions. Eventually, Krishanamachari had to resign. The Nehru government suffered considerable loss of prestige in the incident.

Haridas Mundhra was arrested at his luxury suite at Claridge's Hotel in Delhi, and sent to prison.

It turned out that Mundhra's manipulations were not restricted to LIC. The income tax department had withdrawn certain notices pending against him, having entered into "some understanding" about the payment of arrears.

In recent times, Mundhra is often noted as the forerunner of other financial scamsters of modern India, including Harshad Mehta and Abdul Karim Telgi, who also operated with considerable political connivance. However, unlike in the Mundhra case, the government response in appointing an honest and competent judge, and also the judicial investigation (24 days of public hearings), has been far from transparent. This lack of transparency has also been commented upon in the public investigation of the Bofors Scandal, one of India's largest scandals, which involved Feroze Gandhi's son Rajiv Gandhi, the Prime Minister at the time.
