= Sucheta Dalal =

Indian journalist

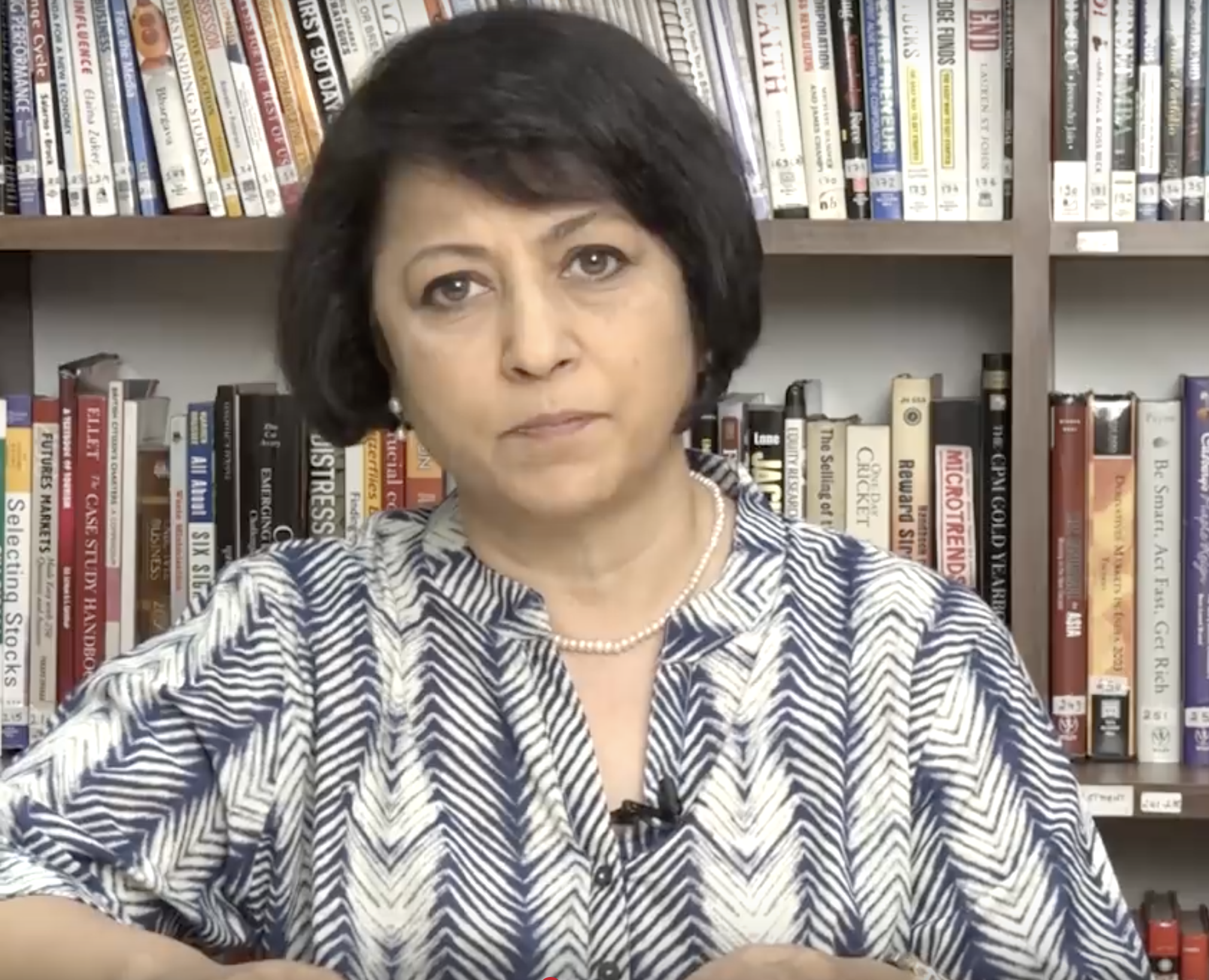
- Dalal in 2019
- Born: 1962 (age 63–64); Bombay, Maharashtra, India
- Education: Karnataka College, Dharwad; University of Bombay
- Occupation: Business journalism
- Known for: Reporting on the 1992 Indian stock market scam
- Notable work: Reporting on the 1992 securities scam
- Spouse: Debashis Basu
- Awards: Padma Shri in 2006
- Website: www.suchetadalal.com

Sucheta Dalal (born 1962) is an Indian business journalist and author. She has been a journalist for over two decades and was awarded a Padma Shri for journalism in 2006. She was the Financial Editor for the Times of India until 1998 when she joined the Indian Express group as a Consulting Editor, leaving in 2008. She is known for exposing the 1992 stock market scam done by Harshad Mehta.

In 2006, she began to write for Moneylife, a fortnightly magazine on investment started by her husband Debashis Basu. She is now the Managing Editor of Moneylife. In 2010, responding to poor financial literacy in India, she and her husband founded Moneylife Foundation, a not-for-profit organisation based in Mumbai. She is a member of the Investor Education & Protection Fund of the Ministry of Corporate Affairs. In 1992, she was honoured with the Chameli Devi Jain Award for Outstanding Women Mediapersons.

== Education and career ==
Sucheta did her schooling at St. Joseph’s Convent School, Belagavi. She then studied B.Sc Statistics at Karnataka College, Dharwad. She is a trained lawyer having gained LL.B and LL.M from Bombay University.

Subsequently, in 1984, Sucheta began her career in journalism by landing a job with Fortune India, an investment magazine. Later, she went on to work in news companies like Business Standard and The Economic Times. In the early 1990s, Dalal joined the prominent Mumbai based newspaper Times of India as a journalist for their Business and economics wing. There she investigated a number of cases that would eventually lead to her prominence in the fields of journalism and activism. These included the Harshad Mehta scam of 1992, the Enron scam, the Industrial Development Bank of India scam, the Ketan Parekh scam in 2001. She worked closely with journalists and analysts such as Debashis Basu, Girish Sant, Shantanu Dixit and Pradyumna Kaul. She later became the Financial editor of Times of India.

== Awards and recognition ==
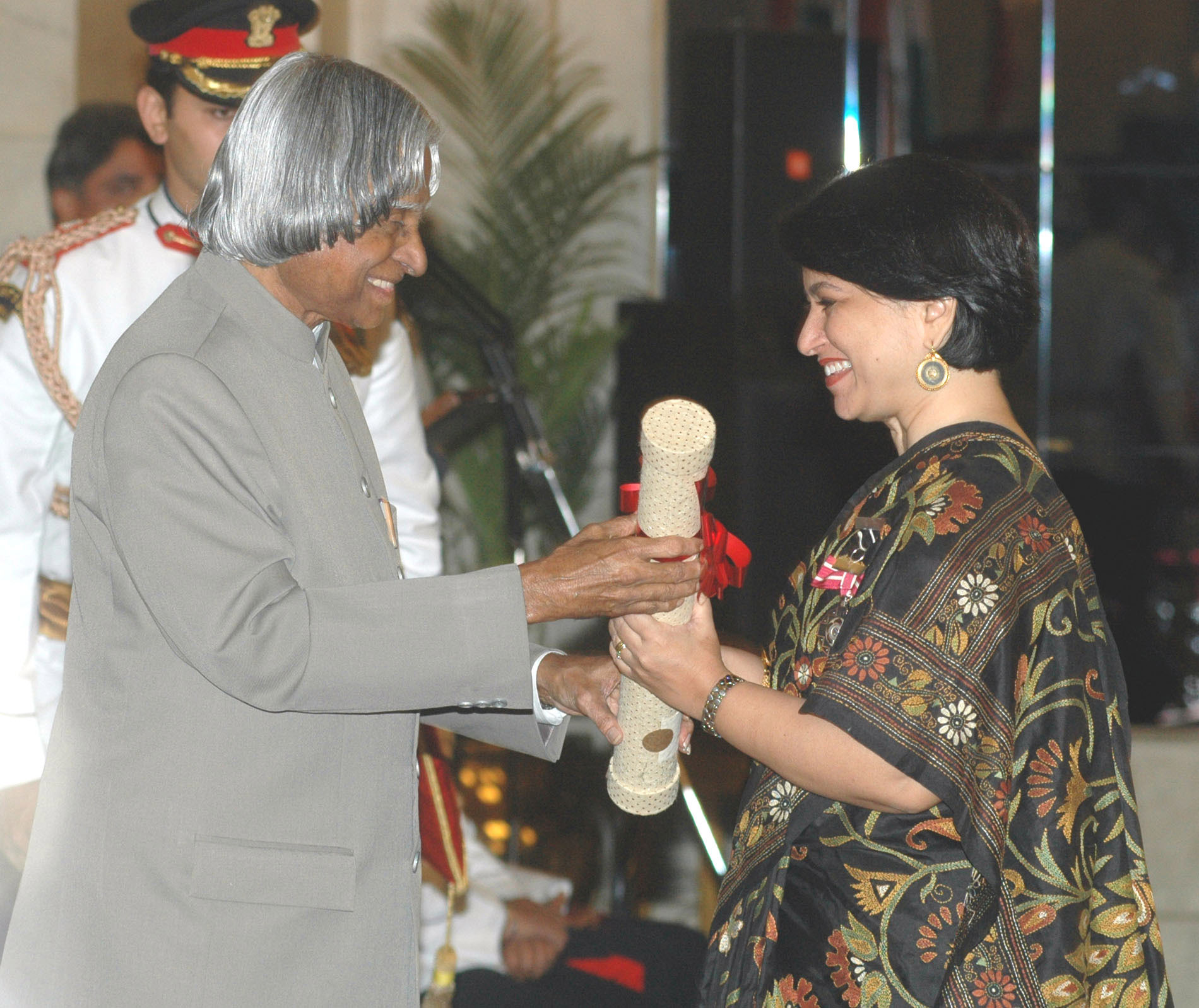
Dalal receiving the Padma Shri from the President A. P. J. Abdul Kalam in 2006

Sucheta has been conferred the Padma Shri Award, the Chameli Devi Award instituted by the Media Foundation, and Femina’s Woman of Substance Award for her zealous work in journalism.

Scam 1992, a docudrama series directed by Hansal Mehta was based on her and Debashis Basu's book The Scam. It was released in October 2020 and Dalal's character was played by Shreya Dhanwanthary.

== Select publications ==
Books

- Debashis, Basu; Dalal, Sucheta (1992), The Scam: Who Won, who Lost, who Got Away, Mumbai: South Asia Books, ISBN 81-85944-10-5
- Dalal, Sucheta (2000), A. D. Shroff: Titan of Finance and Free Enterprise, New Delhi: Viking, ISBN 0-670-89336-6
- Debashis, Basu; Dalal, Sucheta (2021), Absolute Power - Inside story of the National Stock Exchange's amazing success, leading to hubris, regulatory capture and algo scam, Mumbai: Kensource Information Services LLP, ISBN 978-81-95190-73-7

== In popular culture ==
- Actress Shreya Dhanwanthary played Sucheta Dalal in Scam 1992, a Sony LIV's original series. It was based on her own book The Scam: Who Won, Who Lost, who Got Away.
- Actress Ileana D'Cruz has played Meera Rao, a character inspired by Sucheta Dalal in The Big Bull, a 2021 film which is also based on the same book.
