= Scam 1992 =

Indian television series

- Promotional poster
- Genre: Financial thriller; Biography; Drama
- Based on: 1992 Indian stock market scam
- Written by: Sumit Purohit; Saurav Dey; Vaibhav Vishal; Karan Vyas
- Directed by: Hansal Mehta; Jai Mehta; Mukesh Chhabra (Casting Director)
- Starring: Pratik Gandhi; Shreya Dhanwanthary; Hemant Kher; Satish Kaushik
- Music by: Achint Thakkar
- Country of origin: India
- Original language: Hindi
- No. of seasons: 1
- No. of episodes: 10

Production
- Cinematography: Pratham Mehta
- Editors: Kunal Walve; Sumit Purohit
- Running time: 60–75 minutes
- Production companies: Studio NEXT; Applause Entertainment

Original release
- Network: SonyLIV
- Release: 9 October 2020

Scam 1992 – The Harshad Mehta Story is an Indian Hindi-language biographical financial thriller streaming television series on SonyLIV directed by Hansal Mehta, with Jai Mehta serving as the co-director. Based on the 1992 Indian stock market scam committed by many stockbrokers including Harshad Mehta, the series is adapted from journalist Sucheta Dalal and Debashish Basu's 1992 book The Scam: Who Won, Who Lost, Who Got Away. The screenplay and dialogues were written by Sumit Purohit, Saurabh Dey, Vaibhav Vishal and Karan Vyas.

It stars Pratik Gandhi as the protagonist Harshad Mehta, with Shreya Dhanwanthary appearing in a parallel lead role, as Sucheta Dalal. The series also features Satish Kaushik, Anant Mahadevan, Rajat Kapoor, K. K. Raina, Lalit Parimoo, Hemant Kher and Nikhil Dwivedi in pivotal roles. The series focuses on Harshad Mehta's life story, his meteoric rise and the subsequent downfall.

Originally produced by Sameer Nair of Applause Entertainment, Hansal Mehta, worked for three years in writing the script consisting of 550 pages. The project was officially announced in December 2019, with principal shoot beginning following its announcement. Filmed across 200 locations in Mumbai, within 85 days, the shooting was wrapped up in March 2020. The cinematography was handled by Pratham Mehta and the series was edited by Sumit Purohit and Kunal Walve. Achint Thakkar composed the background score.

Scam 1992 was premiered on SonyLIV on 9 October 2020. The series eventually received praise from the performances of the cast members, writing and the major technical aspects. It became the most viewed web series on the streaming platform.

At the 2021 Filmfare OTT Awards, Scam 1992 – The Harshad Mehta Story received a leading 14 nominations, including Best Actress in a Drama Series (Dhanwanthary) and Best Supporting Actress in a Drama Series (Anjali Barot), and won a leading 11 awards, including Best Drama Series, Best Director in a Drama Series (Hansal and Jai) and Best Actor in a Drama Series (Gandhi).

In March 2021, SonyLiv and Applause Entertainment announced the second installment of the franchise titled Scam 2003 based on 2003 Stamp Paper Scam. it is to be developed by Hansal Mehta.

== Cast ==
- Pratik Gandhi as Harshad Mehta
  - Vishesh Bansal as Junior Harshad
- Shreya Dhanwanthary as Sucheta Dalal
- Chirag Vohra as Bhushan Bhatt (loosely based on Sudhir Mehta and Ketan Parekh)
- Anjali Barot as Jyoti Mehta (Harshad's wife)
- Hemant Kher as Ashwin Mehta (Harshad's brother)
- Ramakant Dayma as Shantilal Mehta (Harshad's father)
- Kumkum Das as Rasilaben Mehta (Harshad's mother)
- Nikhil Dwivedi as K. S. Tyagi
- Shadaab Khan as Ajay Kedia (A. K.)
- Paresh Ganatra as R. K. Maheshwari (based on Radhakishan Damani)
- Kavin Dave as Rakesh Jhunjhunwala
- Jay Upadhyay as Pranav Sheth
- Kartik Krishnan as Swami
- Ayaz Khan as Treasury Chief (Bank of America)
- Brinda Trivedi as Deepika Mehta (Ashwin's wife)
- Faisal Rashid as Debasish Basu
- Sharib Hashmi as Sharad Bellary
- K. K. Raina as Manohar J. Pherwani
- Rajat Kapoor as K. Madhavan, Central Bureau of Investigation Joint Director
- Satish Kaushik as Manu Mundra
- Anant Mahadevan as S. Venkitaramanan, RBI Governor
- Ivan Rodrigues as Fortune India Editor
- Mamik Singh as Mr. Rao, CitiBank Chief
- Lalit Parimoo as K. Das, Central Bureau of Investigation Director
- Jaimini Pathak as Sitaraman
- Vivek Vaswani as M. N. Goiporia, SBI Chairman
- Mithilesh Chaturvedi as Ram Jethmalani
- Nagesh Bhosale as Dr. Dutta Ram
- Sharad Jagtiani as Rajdeep Sardesai
- Asif Ali Beg as R. K. Laxman
- Raghav Raj Kakker as Sucheta's source, nicknamed Karamchand
- Rajesh Jais as SBI GM Khemani
- Vikram Kapadia as CMD of Polo
- Hansal Mehta (uncredited)

== Episodes ==
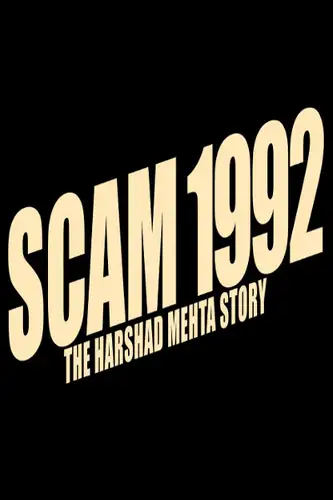
Series logo poster

No.	Title	Directed by	Written by	Original release date
1	"Risk Se Ishq"	Hansal Mehta, Jai Mehta	Sumit Purohit, Saurav Dey	9 October 2020
The episode begins with Sucheta Dalal narrating the rise of the Indian economy and the Bombay Stock Exchange in the 1990s. On 22 April 1992, Sharad Bellary, an employee of State Bank of India comes to the Times of India office to report about a fraud worth ₹500 crores. He reports it to Sucheta (Shreya Dhanwanthary) and tells that Harshad Mehta (Pratik Gandhi) is behind the fraud. In the early years, Harshad lived in a middle-class family with his wife Jyoti, brother Ashwin, father Shantilal and mother Rasilaben. Shantilal owned a cloth business but was not so successful. So Harshad had to do some odd jobs to take care of the family. He got frustrated with the money problem. So he thought of working in the stock market. He got a job as a jobber in the Bombay Stock Exchange. He befriended Bhushan Bhatt, who taught him some of the basics. Harshad struggled on the first day, but he went on to become one of the best jobbers in the market. Then he began to collect insider information, which helped him to target certain stocks to make profits. But he wanted to increase his profit. So he quit his job and opened his own trading account with his brother Ashwin, which made his father frustrated. Later, Ashwin gets married and the whole family shifts to a new apartment. To increase profit, Harshad began spreading fake insider information about the stocks which he targeted. In this way, he managed to win the support of Pranav Sheth, one of the bulls of BSE who was clearly impressed with his skills. In 1982, the market crashed on Black Friday due to the actions of the BSE Bear Cartel and Ajay Kedia and Harshad and his brother had to deal with a loss of ₹10 lakh.
2	"Cobra Killer"	Hansal Mehta, Jai Mehta	Sumit Purohit, Saurav Dey	9 October 2020
The Mehtas are able to settle a part of their debt with family gold. Harshad's trading account remains suspended until the full amount is returned. Before his father's death, Harshad had vowed he would never give up on the Bombay stock exchange. After his father's death, Ashwin informs Harshad that he is planning on leaving for Sri Lanka to find a job. Frustrated by his inability to perform in the stock market, Harshad decides to start his own consulting business, through which he will earn money through commissions. They name their consulting firm Growmore and first target the tea market. Africa, the largest tea producer, has reduced its tea production due to unseasonal rainfall, which will actually benefit Indian tea companies. They manage to settle their debt and regain access to their trading accounts. The firm reaches out to many potential clients to open accounts with them so that they can use surplus funds in the stock market under their portfolio management scheme with the promise of good service and higher returns. In six months, they have several home-grown clients with whom he impressed corporate clients with the help of Pranav. While Sucheta was learning about the stock market concepts Harshad was able to expand their business and get hold of Bushan. Following the assassination of Indira Gandhi, her son Rajiv Gandhi is appointed as the prime minister of India. Manu Mundra believes the market is going to crash, Pranav Seth believes the same but Harshad remains optimistic. Harshad believes in the ongoing liberalization policies and buys all he can without a backup plan. They decide to invest in oil and petroleum companies such as Indrol, Zuari Agro, and SPIC because they are cheap and believe that they will surge. As a means of destroying Harshad's reputation, Manu Mundra creates a perception that Harshad has lost more than a crore, which will cause traders to sell Harshad's stocks. As soon as he learns about it, Harshad decides to pay all his dues in advance.
3	"Paise Ki Dukaan"	Hansal Mehta, Jai Mehta	Sumit Purohit, Saurav Dey	9 October 2020
Once the money market catches Harshad's fancy, he launches his own cartel of brokers and starts dealing with banks. Soon he bags SBI as his client and fate takes a U turn.
4	"Harshad Mehta Is A Liar"	Hansal Mehta, Jai Mehta	Sumit Purohit, Saurav Dey	9 October 2020
Harshad's sudden success catches the attention of the financial journalist, Sucheta Dalal who is actively looking for proofs against him.
5	"Kundli Mein Shani"	Hansal Mehta, Jai Mehta	Sumit Purohit, Saurav Dey	9 October 2020
The RBI Governor on seeing fishy transaction in Harshad's SBI account asks the bank to keep a close eye on his fund movements. Harshad in his safeguarding attempt tries to sweep ₹500 crore off the books.
6	"Stop Press"	Hansal Mehta, Jai Mehta	Sumit Purohit, Saurav Dey	9 October 2020
While Harshad clears off most of his debts to SBI, Sucheta, on receiving a tip from Bellary just won't give up her ordeal of exposing the fraud of ₹500 crore. Both have just twenty four hours to turn the tables.
7	"Dalal Street Ka Dariya"	Hansal Mehta, Jai Mehta	Sumit Purohit, Saurav Dey	9 October 2020
Venkitarajan gets to know that there are multiple banks involved in the money scam and that the scam is much bigger in stature than what it appears on the surface. RBI installs an investigating committee.
8	"Matador"	Hansal Mehta, Jai Mehta	Sumit Purohit, Saurav Dey	9 October 2020
Once Sucheta gets to know from Venkatarajan about the involvement of NHB in the scam, she releases this news which leads CBI to start with interrogation of Pherwani. Harshad fears of Pherwani telling the truth. After Pherwani's death, CBI raided Harshad's house and took him under custody.
9	"Ek Crore Ka Suitcase"	Hansal Mehta, Jai Mehta	Sumit Purohit, Saurav Dey	9 October 2020
The government tries to negotiate with Harshad and his lawyer but eventually it doesn't work. And one day, Harshad along with his lawyer Mr. Ram Jethmalani conducts a press conference in which they publicly tell everyone that the then Prime Minister P. V. Narasimha Rao had been given a briefcase of ₹1 crore by Harshad to finance the by-election campaigning.
10	"Main History Banana Chahta Hoon"	Hansal Mehta, Jai Mehta	Sumit Purohit, Saurav Dey	9 October 2020
CBI pressures both Mehta and the Growmore clients forcing most of the clients scaring to be in the prison. Delhi strikes a deal with Harshad, based on which he withdraws his press statement. Growmore gets back to life with most of Harshad's assets being frozen. However, Bhushan's revelation is soon going to turn Harshad's world upside down. Bhushan sells out Harshad's shares because of the torture from the Central Bureau of Investigation. Harshad and his brother Ashwin are extremely mad at Bhushan for this act. Not knowing about Bhushan's plan beforehand, Harshad informs the CBI about some fraud in his company. Due to this fraud, the CBI thinks that Harshad is involved in a new scam and arrests him. After few months of arrest, Harshad Mehta is suffering from a heart problem. On 31 December 2001, Harshad suffers cardiac arrest in prison. The police bring him to a civil hospital in Thane where he does not receive timely medical attention and breathes his last. Upon hearing the news, Ashwin and his family rush only to find Harshad's dead body in the lobby of the hospital. The episode ends with a voiceover from Sucheta Dalal explaining the aftermath of the scam and a video excerpt taken from an interview featuring the real Harshad Mehta.

== Production ==
=== Development ===
Growing up in the 80s and 90s, we all knew Harshad as a fascinating, larger than life character. I had read The Scam many years ago and even toyed with the idea of making it into a film, which never happened. When Sameer (producer) and I met to discuss what we could do together and he offered this subject to me I had to say yes! I have a lot of respect for Sameer and his knack for choosing content that is relevant and has the potential for mass viewership. I’m looking forward to bringing this thrilling drama to life!

— Hansal Mehta on directing Scam 1992 in an interview with PTI

In February 2018, Sameer Nair, CEO of Applause Entertainment, a content studio from the Aditya Birla Group, announced a web series, consisting of 10 episodes, based on the 1992 Indian stock market scam committed by stockbroker Harshad Mehta, which was adapted by journalist Sucheta Dalal and Debashish Basu, as a novel in the same year, titled The Scam: Who Won, Who Lost, Who Got Away. The makers planned to undergo pre-production works for a year, despite the director and cast and crew were not finalized.

In December 2019, filmmaker Hansal Mehta announced that he will be directing the series, which will be titled Scam 1992. Sumit Purohit, Saurav Dey, Vaibhav Vishal, and Karan Vyas were roped in to pen the screenplay and dialogues. Before the announcement of the series, it was reported that Abhishek Bachchan's The Big Bull, is based on the same plot, while Mehta claimed that the film is based on a fictional work, with the outline of the story being used for the film, while the series is based on Dalal's novel.

=== Casting ===
The casting of the series is done by casting director Mukesh Chhabra, which features around 150 characters. Mehta chose Gujarati theatre actor Pratik Gandhi, to play the protagonist Harshad Mehta, while Shreya Dhanwanthary, was cast to play the parallel lead as Sucheta Dalal. Apart from the lead actors, Satish Kaushik, Anant Mahadevan, Rajat Kapoor, Nikhil Dwivedi, K. K. Raina, and Lalit Parimoo were cast in pivotal roles.

Pratik Gandhi stated that playing the character of Harshad Mehta is an interesting one as "it has many layers of good and bad to it". He further added "The audience will have a great time figuring if the real Harshad Mehta was a hero or a villain". Shreya stated Dalal's character as "a strong, bold and independent woman who broke this story to the world and yet went through mixed emotions through this journey". Gandhi also stated he had to gain weight by 18 kilograms, to fit into the role of Harshad Mehta, whereas the preparations were undergone for more than a year following look tests and script reading.

=== Filming ===
The principal shoot of the film kickstarted in December 2019, soon after the announcement of the series. It was filmed in 200 locations, with major on-location sets were filmed across South Mumbai. The makers recreated huge portions of the sets to resemble the period of 1980s and 1990s. Cinematographer Pratham Mehta, stated that the crew had sought major unused structures in Mumbai to shoot the film.

Mehta's upscale apartment in Worli, was recreated by modifying the exteriors of an existing building at Malvani in Malad West, and the interiors were created inside a bungalow in Madh Island, which were modified to look similar to the actual flat belonging to Harshad Mehta using photographs available online for reference, and some portions were recreated using the help of visual effects. The team also recreated the office headquarters of The Times Group in Mumbai, with a huge set being constructed at the Golden Tobacco Compound in Vile Parle.

Major portions of the film were shot at Bombay Stock Exchange in Mumbai, with the show makers however got permission to shoot for short durations of time. Art director Payal Ghose added, "They were also not allowed to make many changes to the present ring, which has undergone many renovations over the years. Despite this, the team was able to get much of the design right with the help of a consultant who had worked there during that period. The BSE itself also provided a book on its history as a reference point for the production team." The film's shooting which spanned for 89 days, was completed in March 2020, before the COVID-19 pandemic lockdown in India.

=== Music ===
The original score of Scam 1992, was composed by Achint Thakkar. The theme music of the film received a rave response from the listeners, which was followed by the composer who uploaded the theme song through his official YouTube channel. Thakkar worked on the score and soundtrack, during the nationwide lockdown. The theme song consisting of three elements - bass, drums and strings, with an audible and coherent lyrics heard through the theme, is a stretched out, "Hey" being played on loop. He stated "With the tune in mind, I came up with the backbone of the drums, and then played the bass guitar myself. The bass is a very important part of the track and is the main riff which is why it had to be perfect. So it was the three things, with the added vocal which was minimal on top, that made the tune come together as know it in its final version." The song crossed 7 million streams in music streaming platforms upon release and became popular among audiences.

The series also features tracks from the folk band Kabir Café naming 'Do Din Ki Zindagi Hai, Do Din Ka Mela', which is a composition based on the poem of 15th century saint Kabirdas, and a song from their 2016 album 'Panchrang', 'Matkar Maya Ko Ahankar' which is played by the ending scenes of the last episode.

== Marketing and release ==
Scam 1992's digital rights were acquired by SonyLIV, an over-the-top media service platform from Sony Pictures Networks. The teaser of the series was unveiled on 21 August 2020, through the YouTube channel of SonyLIV. The 85-second teaser presents a glimpse of Harshad Mehta's character. The official trailer was unveiled on 25 September 2020, which explores the rise and subsequent downfall of Mehta. The Indian Express stated that "the trailer promises to be an intriguing affair". On 27 September 2020, the makers announced that the series will premiere directly through the streaming platform on 9 October 2020.

The official release through its OTT platform SonyLIV, consists of ten episodes, with being released in Hindi and English languages. Due to the response received by the audiences, and its performance, the makers planned to dub the series in Tamil, Telugu, Malayalam and Kannada languages, in order to have a wide reach towards the audiences. The dubbed versions were made available on 29 November 2020.

Scam 1992's leading actors Pratik Gandhi and Shreya Dhanwanthary played with Free Fire Content Creators Total Gaming and Two Side Gamers on YouTube to promote their Web Series on 21 November 2020 and 22 November 2020 respectively.

== Reception ==
=== Critical response ===
The series received mostly positive reviews from critics, with praise for the performances and writing. Sayan Ghosh of The Hindu wrote "Scam 1992: The Harshad Mehta Story is a well-written show with its lead characters doing all the heavy lifting. Despite its flaws, it provides an intriguing sneak-peek at the untapped potential of homegrown content creators — and what they are capable of — if allowed to run wild with their imagination." Ronak Kotecha, editor-in-chief of The Times of India gave three-and-a-half of five stating "The fact that it’s a real story that captured the country’s collective imagination makes for a riveting watch. It’s almost like our very own desi version of The Wolf of Wall Street and we’re quite bullish that it will keep you invested." Jyoti Sharma Bawa of Hindustan Times said, "Hansal Mehta digs deep into the India of 80s and 90s to tell us the story of the securities scam that shook up the country. Harshad Mehta’s boom-to-bust story is emblematic of its time, but not limited to it." Subhra Gupta of The Indian Express stated "The Hansal Mehta directed series does a smart balancing act, never quite tipping over into Harshad Mehta adulation, nor showing him as an unmitigated villain."

Devasheesh Pandey of News18, gave three-and-a-half out of five stars and stated "Scam 1992: The Harshad Mehta Story does not pronounce guilty verdict on India's first financial sector scamster, but presents us with a morally dubious character and leaves it our sensibilities whether to make him a messiah or a pariah." Tatsam Mukherjee, writing for Firstpost, summarised "In spite of all the research, the show never quite transports us into Harshad's mind — the greed, the compulsive need to be surrounded by materialist things, the arrogance of taking on the government, and the tragedy of a 'pioneer' turned into an outcast." Scroll's chief editor Nandini Ramanath reviewed "Scam 1992 provides ample evidence of Mehta’s dishonesty over 500-plus minutes, only to float the idea that the system was the bigger villain. This bull got big but then ran into the wolves who were stronger, the series lamely suggests."

Moumita Bhattacharya of Rediff gave three-and-a-half out of five and stated "Hansal Mehta's nine-hour drama series Scam 1992 needs to be viewed by everyone, young and old." The News Minute's Saraswati Darar wrote "Scam 1992: The Harshad Mehta Story, it’s a compellingly told labour of love that deserves to be watched." Shefali Deshpande of Bloomberg Quint gave four-and-a-half out of five stating, "Scam 1992 taps into the psychological need to succeed and have prestige." Amman Khurana of Zoom TV, gave four out of five and stated "Scam 1992 – The Harshad Mehta Story, despite being significantly long, never goes off track and keeps you glued till the end. The deft direction, skilfully-stitched screenplay and thorough research do the job." Shubham Kulkarni of Koimoi, gave four out of five and stated "It is one of those rare shows where the primary layer is the only thing to hook on, and the writing does wonders here." Prathyush Parasuraman writing for Film Companion gave a mixed review and said "There’s too much posturing and pouting, and not enough to stay tethered to the 10 long fifty-minute episodes."

=== Impact ===
The music of the series became popular, with the titular track of Scam 1992, was recreated by a beatbox band from France, which went viral on YouTube with 970,000 views upon its release on 4 December 2020.

== Future ==
In March 2021, SonyLiv and Applause Entertainment announced the second installment of the franchise titled Scam 2003. It will be based on the stamp paper scam by Abdul Karim Telgi in 2003. It is directed by Tushar Hiranandani.

== Awards and nominations ==
Year	Award	Category	Recipient	Result	Ref.
2021	Filmfare OTT Awards	Best Drama Series	Scam 1992	Won	
2021	Filmfare OTT Awards	Best Director in a Drama Series	Hansal Mehta and Jai Mehta	Won	
2021	Filmfare OTT Awards	Best Actor in a Drama Series	Pratik Gandhi	Won	
2021	Filmfare OTT Awards	Best Actress in a Drama Series	Shreya Dhanwanthary	Nominated	
2021	Filmfare OTT Awards	Best Supporting Actress in a Drama Series	Anjali Barot	Nominated	
2021	Filmfare OTT Awards	Best Dialogues (Series)	Sumit Purohit, Saurav Dey, Vaibhav Vishal and Karan Vyas	Won	
2021	Filmfare OTT Awards	Best Adapted Screenplay (Series)	Sumit Purohit and Saurav Dey	Won	
2021	Filmfare OTT Awards	Best Background Music (Series)	Achint Thakkar	Won	
2021	Filmfare OTT Awards	Best Original Soundtrack (Series)	Achint Thakkar	Won	
2021	Filmfare OTT Awards	Best Editing (Series)	Kunal Walve, Sumit Purohit	Won	
2021	Filmfare OTT Awards	Best Cinematographer (Series)	Pratham Mehta	Won	
2021	Filmfare OTT Awards	Best Production Design (Series)	Payal Ghose and Tapan Shrivastava	Won	
2021	Filmfare OTT Awards	Best Costume Design (Series)	Arun J. Chauhan	Won	
2021	Filmfare OTT Awards	Best VFX (Series)	Raghav Rai	Won	
