= 1992 Indian stock market scam =

Scam on the Bombay Stock Exchange

The 1992 Indian stock market scam was a market manipulation carried out by Harshad Mehta with other bankers and politicians on the Bombay Stock Exchange. The scam caused significant disruption to the stock market of India, defrauding investors of over $15 million.

The techniques used by Mehta involved having corrupt officials sign fake cheques, abusing market loopholes, and using fabrication to drive stock prices up to 40 times their original value. Stock traders making good returns as a result of the scam were able to fraudulently obtain unsecured loans from banks. When the scam was discovered in April 1992, India's stock market crashed, and the same banks suddenly found themselves holding millions of Indian rupees (INR) in useless debt.

== 1992 Scandal ==
=== Overview ===
The 1992 scandal was the biggest money market scam ever committed in India, amounting to approximately ₹ 5,000 crores. The main perpetrator of the scam was a stock and money market broker, Harshad Mehta. It was a systematic stock scam using fake bank receipts and stamp paper that caused the Indian stock market to crash. The scam exposed the inherent loopholes in the Indian financial system and resulted in a completely reformed system of stock transactions, including the introduction of online security systems.

Security fraud refers to the diversion of funds from the banking system to various stockholders or brokers. The 1992 scam was a systematic fraud committed by Mehta in the Indian stock market, which led to the complete collapse of security systems. He siphoned off over ₹1000 crore from the banking system to buy stocks on the Bombay Stock Exchange. This impacted the entire exchange system as the security system collapsed and investors lost hundreds of thousands of rupees. The scope of the scam was so large that the net value of the stocks was higher than the combined health and education budget of India. The scam was orchestrated in such a way that Mehta secured securities from the State Bank of India against forged cheques signed by corrupt officials and failed to deliver the securities. Mehta inflated stock prices through fictitious practices and sold the stocks he owned in these companies. The scam had many consequences, including losses incurred by lakhs of families and the immediate crash of the stock market. The index fell from 4500 to 2500, representing a loss of ₹ 1000 billion in market capitalization. The 1992 scam raised many questions about bank officials responsible for colluding with Mehta. An interview with Montek Singh Ahluwalia (Secretary, economic affairs at the Ministry of Finance) revealed that many top bank officials were involved.

=== Bank funds scam ===
In the early 60's and 70's, banks in India were not allowed to invest in the equity markets. However, they were expected to post profits and retain a certain ratio (threshold) of their assets in government fixed interest bonds. Mehta siphoned capital out of the banking system to address this requirement and pumped this money into the share market. He promised the banks higher rates of interest while asking them to transfer the money into his personal account under the guise of buying securities for them from other banks. At that time, a bank had to go through a broker to buy securities and forward bonds from other banks. Mehta used this money temporarily in his account to buy shares, increase demand of certain shares (such as that of ACC, Sterlite Industries, and Videocon), sell them off, pass on a part of the proceeds to the bank, and keep the rest for himself. This resulted in stocks like ACC, which was trading in 1991 for ₹200/share, catapult to nearly ₹9,000 in just 3 months.

=== Bank receipt scam ===
Another major instrument was the bank receipt (BR). In a ready forward deal, securities were not moved back and forth in actuality. Instead, the borrower, i.e. the seller of securities, gave the buyer of the securities a BR. The BR serves as a receipt from the selling bank, and also promises that the buyer will receive the securities they have paid for at the end of the term. Having figured this out, Mehta needed banks, which could issue fake BRs, or BRs not backed by any government securities.

Once these fake BRs were issued, they were passed on to other banks and the banks in turn gave money to Mehta, plainly assuming that they were lending against government securities when this was not really the case. He took the price of ACC from ₹200 to ₹9,000. That was an increase of 4,400%. Since he had to book profits in the end, the day he sold was the day when the markets crashed.

=== Ready forward deal scam ===
The ready forward deal is a way where a single broker liaisons between two banks. When one bank wants to sell securities, it approaches the broker. This broker goes to another bank and tries to sell the securities and vice versa for buying. Since Mehta was a renowned broker, he issued cheques in his name instead of the bank. When the bank wanted money for the securities, he approached another bank and repeated the same process, and invested the bank money in the stock market. Mehta used the ready forward deal and applied it to the Bank Receipts system of the Indian financial systems. This system was the most flawed system as the Janakiraman Committee restructured the entire Bank Receipts system after the 1992 scam.

Mehta used forged BRs to gain unsecured loans, and used several small banks to issue BRs on demand. Since these banks were small, Mehta held on to the receipts as long as he wanted. The cheques in favour of both the banks were credited into the brokers' accounts which was the account of Mehta. As a result, banks made heavy investments in BOK and MCB as they showed positive signs of growth. Using the BR scam, Mehta took the price of ACC from ₹200 to ₹9000 in a short span of time. This 4400% percent increase was seen in several other stocks and as he sold the stocks, the market crashed.

This went on as long as the stock prices kept going up, and no one had a clue about Mehta's operations. Once the scam was exposed, though, a lot of banks were left holding BRs which did not have any value – the banking system had been swindled of a whopping ₹4,000 crore (equivalent to ₹340 billion or US$3.6 billion in 2026). They knew that they would be accused if their involvement in issuing cheques to Mehta was discovered. Subsequently, it transpired that Citibank brokers like Pallav Sheth and Ajay Kayan, industrialists like Aditya Birla, Hemendra Kothari, a number of politicians, and the RBI Governor S.Venkitaramanan all had played a role in allowing or facilitating Mehta's rigging of the share market.

=== Realization of scam and market crash ===
The scam first became apparent in late April 1992, when it became clear that Mehta was a disproportionately large investor in government securities. At the time, Mehta was doing more than a third of the total securities business in India. When the public realized that Mehta's investments were illegitimate and that his stocks were likely worthless, it set off a selling frenzy of Mehta's stocks. The banks that had loaned money to Mehta were suddenly holding hundreds of millions in unsecured loans. The combination of the selling frenzy and the fact that numerous banks had been defrauded crashed the Indian stock market, with prices dropping 40% immediately. Stocks eventually dropped 72%, and a bear market lasted for about 2 years.

This table illustrates the extent of money certain banks lost.

Name of Bank	₹ in crores
National Housing Bank (NHB)	1,199.39
State Bank Of Saurashtra	175.04
SBI Capital Markets Ltd (SBI Caps)	121.23
Standard Chartered Bank	300.00
Total	1,795.66

== Exposure, trial and conviction ==
Exploiting several loopholes in the banking system, Mehta and his associates siphoned off funds from inter-bank transactions and bought shares at a premium across many segments, triggering a rise in the BSE SENSEX. When the scheme was exposed, banks started demanding their money back, causing the collapse. He was later charged with 72 criminal offences, and more than 600 civil action suits were filed against him.

He was arrested and banished from the stock market with investors holding him responsible for causing losses to various entities. Mehta and his brothers were arrested by the CBI on 9 November 1992 for allegedly misappropriating more than 2.8 million shares of about 90 companies through forged share transfer forms. The total value of the shares misappropriation was placed at ₹250 crore (equivalent to ₹21 billion or US$220 million in 2026). He was found not guilty for any of the cases.

Mehta made a brief comeback as a stock market guru, giving tips on his own website as well as a weekly newspaper column. However, in September 1999, Bombay High Court convicted and sentenced him to five years rigorous imprisonment and a fine of ₹25,000 (US$270). On 14 January 2003, The Supreme Court of India confirmed High Court's judgement in a 2–1 decision. While Justice B.N. Agrawal and Justice Arijit Pasayat upheld his conviction, Justice M.B. Shah voted to acquit him.

While serving his prison sentence in a Thane prison in December 2001, Mehta complained of chest pain late at night and was admitted to the Thane Civil Hospital. He died following a brief heart ailment, at the age of 47, on 31 December 2001, with several litigations pending against him.

== Impacts ==
The immediate impact was a drastic fall in share prices and market index, causing a breakdown of the securities control system operation with the commercial banks and the RBI. Around ₹35 billion from the ₹2,500 billion market was withdrawn, causing the share market collapse. The Bombay Stock shares resorted to records tampering in the trading system. It caused panic with the public and banks were severely impacted. Banks like Standard Chartered and ANZ Grindlays were implicated in the scam for bank receipt forgery and transfer of money into Mehta's personal account. The government realized that the fundamental problem with the financial structure of the stock markets was the lack of computerized systems which impacted the whole stock market.

Various bank officers were investigated and implicated in fraudulent charges. The five main accused officials were related to the Financial Fairgrowth Services Limited (FFSL) and Andhra Bank Financial Services Ltd (ABFSL). The chairman of Vijaya Bank committed suicide following the news about the bank receipt scam. The scam led to the resignation of P. Chidambaram who was accused of owning shell companies connected to Mehta. Mehta was convicted by the Bombay High Court and the Supreme Court of India for his part in the financial scandal valued at ₹49.99 billion (US$740 million). Various bank officials were arrested, leading to a complete breakdown of banking systems.

=== Subsequent reforms ===
The first reform was the formation of the National Stock Exchange of India (NSE). It was followed by the development of the CII Code for Desirable Corporate Governance by Rahul Bajaj. The CII Code commanded the formation of two major committees headed by Kumar Mangalam Birla and N. R. Narayana Murthy, and overseen by the Securities and Exchange Board of India (SEBI). The objective was to monitor corporate governance and prevent future scams. The SEBI were to monitor the NSE and the National Securities Depository. For the equity market, the government introduced ten acts of parliament and one constitutional amendment based upon the principles of economic reform and legislative changes. The introduction of online trading by NSE changed the dynamics of stock buying and selling. The financial market opened up nationally rather than being confined to Bombay (now, Mumbai).

=== Changes in the financial structure of India ===
The 1992 scam collapsed the Indian stock market; around 40% of the market value or ₹1,000 billion was wiped out. It led the authorities to reconsider existing financial systems and restructure it. The first structural change was to record payments made for purchasing investments in reconciled bank receipts and subsidiary general ledgers to prevent fraudulent transactions. On the advice of the Janakiraman Committee, a committee was established to oversee the Securities and Exchange Board of India. The primary recommendation of the committee was to limit ready forward and double ready forward deals to government securities only. All banks were made custodians rather than principals in transactions. Banks were to have a separate audit system for portfolios, and it were to be monitored by the Reserve Bank of India (RBI).

== In popular culture ==
Gafla is a 2006 Indian Hindi-language crime drama film directed by Sameer Hanchate inspired by this incident. The scam was dramatized in the 2020 web series Scam 1992, created by Hansal Mehta, with Pratik Gandhi and Shreya Dhanwanthary playing the roles of Harshad Mehta and Sucheta Dalal respectively. The series was adapted from journalist Sucheta Dalal and Debashish Basu's 1992 book The Scam: Who Won, who Lost, who Got Away. The scam was portrayed in the 2020 Indian webseries, The Bull Of Dalal Street on Ullu. The Big Bull is a 2021 Indian Hindi-language film directed by Kookie Gulati, starring Abhishek Bachchan as Harshad Mehta loosely based on his life and the 1992 scam. In movie Lucky Baskhar, a character named Harsha Mehra was based on Harshad Mehta and related to the securities scam, 1992.

== See also ==
- Bombay Stock Exchange
- Ketan Parekh
- Abdul Karim Telgi
- Ramalinga Raju
- Hasan Ali Khan
- List of scandals in India
- National Stock Exchange of India
