= Moneylife =

Personal finance magazine published in India

- Publisher: Moneywise Media Pvt. Ltd
- Founder: Debashis Basu; Sucheta Dalal
- Country: India
- Language: English
- Website: moneylife.in

Moneylife is an online personal finance website. The original fortnightly print edition ceased production from May 2018.

== History ==
Moneylife was founded by husband and wife team of Debashis Basu and Sucheta Dalal in 2006.

The Moneylife foundation was launched in 2010.

The National Stock Exchange of India (NSEoI) filed a Rs 100 crore defamation suit against Moneylife over a June 2015 publication of a whistleblower letter over allegations of preferential access to some brokers, the suit being withdrawn in September 2017.

The final print edition of the magazine was published in May 2018.
