= Shreya Dhanwanthary =

Indian actress (born 1988)

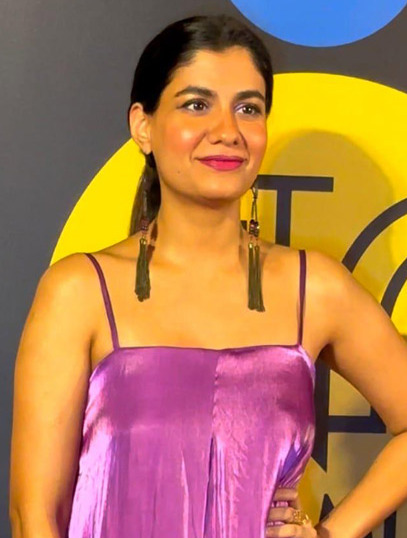
- Dhanwanthary in 2023
- Born: 29 August 1988 (age 38); Hyderabad, Andhra Pradesh, India
- Education: NIT Warangal
- Occupation: Actress
- Years active: 2009–present

Shreya Dhanwanthary (born 29 August 1988) is an Indian actress who appears in Hindi films and television shows. She made her debut with Telugu film Josh in 2009. She had her break-out role in the Amazon Prime Video thriller series The Family Man (2019–2021) and gained praise for her portrayal of journalist Sucheta Dalal in Sony LIV's biographical drama series Scam 1992 (2020).

== Early life ==
Shreya Dhanwanthary was born on 29 August 1988 in Hyderabad to a Telugu speaking mother and a Telugu speaking father. She moved to Dubai with her parents when she was two months old. Brought up in Middle East and Delhi, Dhanwanthary graduated from NIT Warangal in Electronics and Communication Engineering.

== Career ==
Dhanwanthary participated in Femina Miss India South 2008 when she was a third year engineering student. She was placed as 1st Runner-up in the event. After that she went on to compete at Miss India 2008 as a finalist.

Soon after Miss India 2008, she was offered a role in the Telugu film like Josh and Sneha Geetham. She made her Bollywood debut with Why Cheat India opposite Emraan Hashmi. She has also authored a book titled Fade To White.

In 2019, she played Zoya in the web series The Family Man of Amazon Prime Video for season 1 and continued the role in Season 2 (June 2021) on Amazon Prime. In 2020, she played Sucheta Dalal in the webseries Scam 1992. In 2021, Dhanwanthary is seen playing the role of Mansi in the Amazon Prime web series Mumbai Diaries 26/11. Directed by Nikkhil Advani and produced by Emmay Entertainment, it also features Konkona Sen Sharma, Mohit Raina and Tina Desai in the lead roles.

== Filmography ==
=== Films ===
Key
†	Denotes films that have not yet been released

Year	Film	Role	Language	Notes	Ref.
2009	Josh	Bhavana	Telugu	Debut film	
2010	Sneha Geetham	Shailu	Telugu	Debut as lead actress	
2019	Why Cheat India	Nupur Dubey	Hindi	Hindi debut	
2022	Looop Lapeta	Julia	Hindi		
2022	Chup: Revenge of the Artist	Nila Menon	Hindi		
2024	Adbhut	Dr. Shruthi Rawat	Hindi		
2025	The Great Shamsuddin Family	Iram Shamsuddin	Hindi	JioHotstar film	
TBA	Nausikhiye †		Hindi	Filming	

=== Television ===
Year	Title	Role	Language	Network	Notes	Ref.
2016	Ladies Room	Radhika Khanna	English	YouTube	Web Debut	
2018	The Reunion	Devanshi Tailor	Hindi	YouTube		
2019–present	The Family Man	Zoya	Hindi	Amazon Prime Video		
2020	A Viral Wedding	Nisha Ahuja	Hindi	YouTube	Also director, writer and producer	
2020	Scam 1992	Sucheta Dalal	Hindi	SonyLIV		
2021	Mumbai Diaries 26/11	Mansi Hirani	Hindi	Amazon Prime Video		
2022	Unpaused: Naya Safar	Akriti	Hindi	Amazon Prime Video	Under Segment:"The Couple"	
2023	Guns & Gulaabs	Yamini	Hindi	Netflix		

=== Short films ===
Year	Title	Role	Language	Channel	Notes
2012	The Girl in Me	Tina / Tara	Hindi	YouTube	
2023	Next, Please		Hindi	YouTube	
