= Gafla =

- Directed by: Sameer Hanchate
- Written by: Sameer Hanchate; Rajiv Velicheti; Bijesh Jayarajan
- Screenplay by: Rajiv Velicheti
- Starring: Vinod Sharawat; Shruti Ulfat; Vikram Gokhale; Brijendra Kala
- Release date: 6 October 2006
- Running time: 127 minutes
- Country: India
- Language: Hindi

Gafla is a 2006 Indian Hindi-language crime drama film directed by Sameer Hanchate. It is a film inspired from the stock market scam of 1992 which mainly involved Harshad Mehta that rocked the Indian economy and changed lives of thousands forever.

The film was nominated for many awards and won third Cyprus International Film Festival, 2008, 'Aphrodite Medallion' for 'Best Script' (Sameer Hanchate, Rajiv Velicheti, Bijesh Jayarajan), RACE - V. Shantaram Awards 2007 -Best Debut Director (Sameer Hanchate). It was selected for The Times BFI 50th London Film Festival 2006.

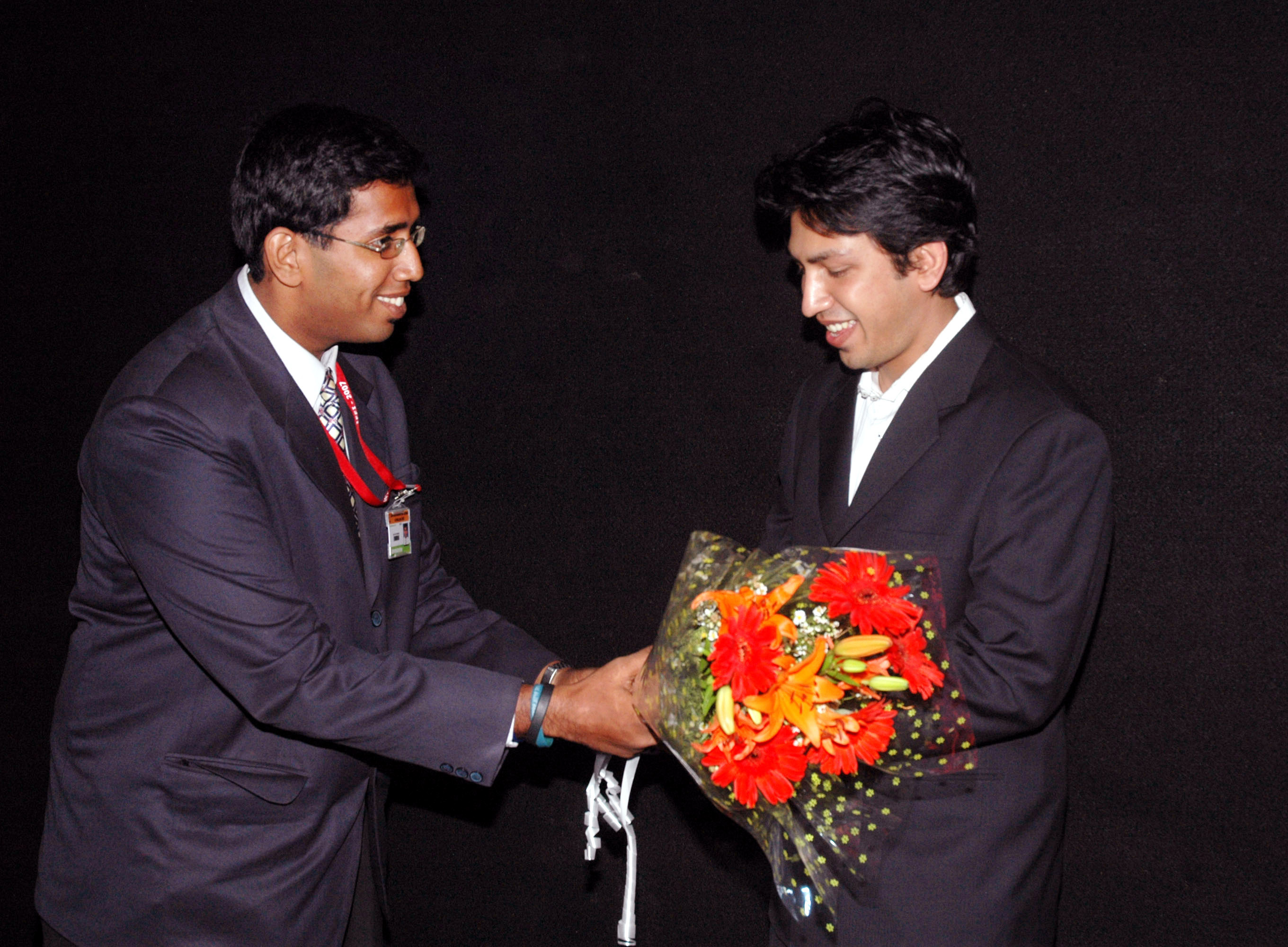
Hanchate at IFFI 2007

== Plot ==
An ordinary young man, Subodh, starts out as like any middle-class guy, with limited opportunities to survive and get ahead. It is Subodh's journey into the stock markets and beyond through the eyes of different people in his personal and professional life. The film follows a story about big dreams. An adventure that starts with ambitious intentions but gets caught up in a crime-web.

== Cast ==
- Vinod Sharawat as Subodh Mehta
- Shruti Ulfat as Vidya
- Purva Parag as Maya
- Vikram Gokhale as Bhejnani
- Brijendra Kala as Hari
- Shakti Singh as Thakur
- Gyan Prakash as Jugaad Singh
- Pramatesh Mehta as Banker Wadhwani
- Saurabh Dubey
- Aditya Lakhia as Jayant
- Mangal Kenkre
- Sameer Hanchate as Aakash Parekh

== Production ==
This film was produced and presented by Sameer Hanchate's Metropolis Multimedia Company.

== Reception ==
The Times of India rated the film 2 out of 5 stars. Taran Adarsh of Bollywood Hungama rated it 1.5 out of 5 stars.
