= Madhavpura Mercantile Cooperative Bank =

Indian interstate bank (1968–2012)

- Type: cooperative
- Industry: Banking
- Founded: Ahmedabad, Gujarat (10 October 1968)
- Defunct: yes
- Fate: Licence cancelled by RBI on 1 June 2012
- Headquarters: Ahmedabad
- Area served: Interstate
- Key people: BKR Maruti(CEO); Ramesh Parikh (Chairman); Devendra Pandya (Managing Director)
- Net income: – ₹1,147.13 crore (US$120 million)

Madhavpura Mercantile Cooperative Bank (MMCB) was a Gujarat-based interstate cooperative bank that became defunct and lost its licence after it was unable to pay back the money it owed public depositors. Reserve Bank of India cancelled its licence in June 2012 under section 22 of the Banking regulations Act, 1949.

== History ==
Madhavpura Mercantile Cooperative Bank was registered as a cooperative society in Gujarat on 27 September 1968. It began business within a fortnight, on 10 October, in Ahmedabad's Madhavpura spice-market area dealing with grocery traders. It received its banking licence 26 years later, on 19 August 1994, and became an interstate cooperative bank in April 1996. Three years later, in 1999, its status improved to that of a scheduled bank.

== Involvement with stock brokers and impact of the 2001 Sensex crash ==
In 1999–2000, when the bank had 50,000 public depositors, it started lending out large sums of money to stock brokers in gross violation of Reserve Bank of India (RBI) rules and regulations. The MMCB had issued pay orders worth ₹1,200 crore (US$120 million) to stock broker Ketan Parekh, which he discounted at Bank of India. The bank had also lent money to Mukesh Babu and Sirish Maniar of the brokerage firm Maniar Group. At the time banks in India were not allowed to lend more than ₹15 crore (US$1.6 million) to stock brokers. In early 2001 Parekh and other brokers made a large sum of money when the Bombay Stock Exchange's Sensex saw a bull run; however, when the dotcom bubble burst, the Sensex dropped down to 3,000 points, and Parekh and the bank started having problems. On 8 March 2001, the news broke out that the bank had given a huge guarantee to Parekh which he lost in the stock crash. As little remained in the bank's coffers, public depositors began withdrawing their money; only a few were successful.

Prior to the scam, the Madhavpura Mercantile Cooperative Bank was the largest urban cooperative bank in Gujarat. It had a deposit base of ₹1,200 crore (US$120 million) in March 2001, half of which was from other banks. Seeing the condition of the bank and fear of losing their money among the depositors the RBI restricted the bank's operations on 13 March 2001. The Central Registrar of Cooperative Societies superseded the bank's board, whose 12 members were

1. Ramesh Chandra Parikh (Chairman)
2. Devendra Pandya (MD)
3. Ramanlal Parikh
4. Natverlal Desai
5. Manilal Shah
6. Prabhudas Kothari
7. Purushottamdas Shah
8. Pravinchandra Shah
9. Pravinchandra Patel
10. Dinesh Majumdar
11. Sevantilal Shah
12. Natverlal Thakker

== Investigation and steps taken by RBI ==
On 13 March 2001 the RBI found out that the bank's net worth was −₹1,147.13 crore (US$120 million), its deposit erosion was 90.9% and gross non-performing assets were 88.2% and ₹1,192.81 crore (US$120 million). The next day, the registrar superseded the board and appointed an administrator as the overseer of the bank. On 23 August a scheme for reconstruction of the bank was approved by the RBI for a period of 10 years. Further investigations revealed that after chairman Ramesh Chandra Parikh's son Vinit had lost ₹50 crore (US$5.2 million) in the stock-market crash, his losses were paid for through the bank's funds.

By February 2004 the bank was able to recover ₹200 crore (US$21 million) from other banks; Ketan Parekh had returned only ₹6 crore (US$620,000). He was arrested that August, and in December a special Central Bureau of Investigation (CBI) court set up for the case cancelled Parekh's conditional bail after he failed to pay the promised ₹380 crore (US$39 million). In June 2003, a New Delhi court granted the CBI a five-day remand of the two Maniar Group stockbrokers – Shirish Manyar and Mukesh Babu. Chargesheets were filed against MMCB chairman Parikh, its CEO Devendra Pandya, Ketan Parekh and his associate Dharmesh Joshi. Joshi's bank account in London containing £6 million was frozen by the CBI in March 2006.

== Cancellation of licence ==
Reserve Bank of India found out on 31 March 2011 that the bank's net assets were worth -₹1,316.50 crore (US$140 million) and deposit erosion was 100 percent, the gross non performing assets were -₹1,126.55 crore (US$120 million) and losses were ₹1,357.41 crore (US$140 million). After the reconstruction scheme expired on 23 August 2011 and after seeing no major improvement in the bank's performance the RBI advised the Government of India on 26 December to liquidate the bank. On 4 January 2012 the Central Task Force for Cooperative Urban Banks also gave the same advice to the Government of India.

The Reserve bank issued a showcause notice to the bank on 16 March 2012 asking why it banking licence should not be cancelled. The cooperative bank replied that the main reason for the failure of the restructuring scheme was the unwillingness of the other cooperative banks to fulfill their commitments and it suggested another revival plan in which an NRI was willing to give ₹500 crore (US$52 million) to the bank for a period of 10 years through the World Bank. It was able to recover only ₹3 crore (US$310,000) from public defaulters and ₹800 crore (equivalent to ₹32 billion or US$330 million in 2023) were debt on Ketan Parekh. Also the bank neither had any background information regarding the NRI who was willing to help nor the source of his funds. Seeing this the RBI cancelled the bank's licence with effect from 4 June 2012.

As of 5 June 2012 Parekh had paid only ₹329 crore (US$34 million). Parekh alone had to pay ₹569 crore (US$59 million) at the interest rate of 12% per year resulted ₹668 crore (US$69 million).

As of June 2013, 700 civil and 230 criminal cases filed by the bank were pending in various courts. Several cases were filed against the bank and in 70 of these cases trial hadn't begun as of March 2014. One of the accused Ramesh Chandra Parikh, former chairman of the bank died in 2007 while in judicial custody. In January 2011 the public prosecutor in the case, Chetan Shah demanded re-investigation of the case.

== Aftermath ==
After the scam was unfolded the RBI restricted the cooperative banks from providing money to brokerage firms, giving assistance against securities such as shares and debentures and formed task forces to formulate revival plans for the banks that were affected. In most cases the affected bank was merged to a bigger Urban Cooperative Bank. The banking regulatory authority increased the number of inspections of balance sheets of cooperative banks from once in two years to every year. A parliamentary panel was set up to investigate in the stock market scam. The panel found out that the urban cooperative banks were manipulating their activities and that in absence of any inspecting authority many brokerage firms were using funds provided by these banks to manipulate the market. After the scam cooperative banks found it difficult to win back the trust and confidence of their customers. Chairman of the National Federation of Urban Cooperative Banks & Credit Societies Ltd, H K Patil had said;

The MMCB episode came as a big storm to the cooperative movement. However, the movement withstood and overcome the storm and for past few years, cooperative banks are seen doing fairly well. The regulator, too, has taken a note of the operations of UCBs,

The Bank filed a large number of cases against various defaulters. CID and Central Bureau of Investigation filed several charge sheets. In the case, a defaulter agreed to pay back the withstanding amount case against him was closed. Over 40 cases against defaulters were still pending in Mumbai as of July 2012. Government bodies like Bank of India and Deposit Insurance & Credit Guarantee Corporation were given priority for due recovery. After the scam Securities and Exchange Board of India, the regulatory body for the Indian stock markets was given more power in investigating cases against manipulation and insider trading and to impose heavy penalty and initiate criminal proceedings. Chartered accounted M.M. Chitale played a key role in the formulation and execution of restructuring scheme. The committee under Chitale recommended that the bank should be allowed to make payments under a restructuring scheme. He refused to accept any fees for his work. MMCB repaid ₹665 crore (US$69 million) due to 268 banks in installments.

The RBI issued a circular on 21 July 2004 to the banks that had deposited money with the MMCB to treat their deposits to the bank as non-performing assets and submit the particulars of their deposits to the reserve bank. MMCB auctioned properties of defaulters worth ₹85 crore (US$8.8 million) on 3 November 2004. Parekh was arrested after the scam garnered media attention. A lower court granted him bail on the condition that he will pay back ₹380 crore (US$39 million) to the bank in three years ending 24 August 2004. He failed to fulfill the condition and filed a plea in the Gujarat High Court to change the terms and conditions of the bail but the court asked him to withdraw the plea. Ketan Parekh offered to pay ₹50 crore (US$5.2 million) in 5 installments by May 2005 but the MMCB rejected his proposal. Nitin Constructions agreed to pay ₹11.50 crore (US$1.2 million) it owed to the MMCB and Dharnendra Agro Foods that owed Rs ₹6.91 crore (US$720,000) to the bank agreed to pay back the withstanding amount. In August 2005 the bank disbursed ₹140 crore (US$15 million) which included 25% of the principal amount and interest at the rate of 3% per annum to its public depositors and other cooperative banks in Rajkot. Till March 2011 there were 1,645 Urban Cooperative Banks registered with the Reserve Bank of India. RBI had received 158 proposals for merging some of these banks and it issued no-objection certificates to 95 of these proposals. Only 6 UCBs had assets greater than ₹500 crore (US$52 million).

== Political allegations ==
In July 2010 Arjun Modhwadia, an Indian National Congress politician alleged that Amit Shah who was a former director of the bank, had received ₹2.50 crore (US$260,000) in bribe from Ketan Parekh in exchange for help in the case. During the 2014 Indian general election Digvijay Singh also made similar allegations. In August 2011 before the term for the restructuring scheme was to finish a delegation representing the banking industry met with the Secretary of Union agriculture ministry P K Basu. However RBI cancelled the bank's licence in June 2012.

== Liquidation committee ==
In 2013 the bank had to recover ₹1,467 crore (US$150 million) from a total number of 851 defaulters including 18 members of the broker Parikh's group which owed ₹1,117 crore (US$120 million) and another ₹350 crore (US$36 million) owed by 833 defaulters. Chaman Kumar, a retired Indian Administrative Service officer had been appointed the liquidator. The other members of liquidation committee were;

- P S Shenoy (former chairman of Bank of Baroda)
- Siddharth Sinha (IIMA professor)
- Kaushik Patel (Chartered accountant)

In 2012 the bank owed a total of ₹1,596 crore (US$170 million):

- ₹665 crore (US$69 million) to 281 banks
- ₹436 crore (US$45 million) to Deposit Insurance & Credit Guarantee Corporation
- ₹166 crore (US$17 million) as interest
- ₹144 crore (US$15 million) to Bank of India
- ₹98 crore (US$10 million) to public account holders
- ₹87 crore (US$9.0 million) to Reserve Bank of India

Till 2013 the bank had launched 5 One time settlement schemes; in 2000, 2001, 2004, 2007 and 2013.
