= Haigam =

Village in Jammu and Kashmir, India

- Village
- Location in Jammu and Kashmir Haigam (India)
- Coordinates: 34.2420°N 74.4988°E
- Country: India
- Union Territory: Jammu and Kashmir
- District: Baramulla
- Tehsil: Sopore

Area
  - Total: 560.9 ha (1,386 acres)
- Elevation: 1,584 m (5,197 ft)

Population
  - Total: 6,212

Languages
  - Official: Kashmiri, Urdu, Hindi, English
- Time zone: UTC+05:30 (IST)
- PIN: 193202
- Telephone Code: 01954
- Vehicle registration: JK-05
- Literacy: 56.81%
- Village Code: 002219
- Website: barammulla.nic.in

Haigam is a census village in Baramulla district, Jammu & Kashmir, India. As per the 2011 Census of India, Haigam has a total population of 6,212 people including 3,148 males and 3,064 with a literacy rate of 60.61%.

A 4,800-year-old pot found in apple orchard at Haigam is named after American actress Kim Kardashian.

Haigam is also one of the militancy-affected areas in Jammu & Kashmir district.

== Tourism ==
The Haigam lake is interest of tourist visit.
