= Harshad Mehta =

Indian stockbroker and businessman (1954–2001)

Harshad Shantilal Mehta
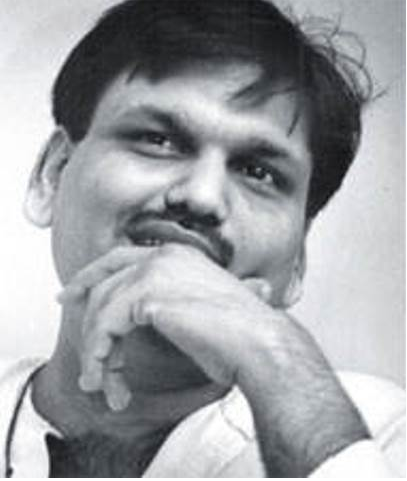
- Born: 29 July 1954; Paneli Moti, Saurashtra State (now in Gujarat), India
- Died: 31 December 2001 (aged 47); Thane, Maharashtra, India
- Occupations: Businessman; stockbroker
- Criminal penalty: 5 years imprisonment

Harshad Shantilal Mehta (29 July 1954 – 31 December 2001) was an Indian stockbroker and convicted fraudster. Mehta's involvement in the 1992 Indian securities scam (amouting to ₹30,000 crore (equivalent to ₹2.5 trillion or US$27 billion in 2026) led him to gain infamy for market manipulation.

Of the 27 criminal charges brought against Mehta, he was convicted of only four before his death by sudden heart attack at age 47 in 2001. It was alleged that Mehta engaged in a massive stock manipulation scheme financed by worthless bank receipts, which his firm brokered for "ready forward" transactions between banks. Mehta was convicted by the Bombay High Court and the Supreme Court of India for his part in a financial scandal valued at ₹100 billion (US$1.1 billion) which took place on the Bombay Stock Exchange (BSE). The scandal exposed the loopholes in the Indian banking system and the Bombay Stock Exchange (BSE) transaction system, and consequently the Securities and Exchange Board of India introduced new rules to address those loopholes. He was on trial for 9 years, until he died at the end of 2001 from a heart attack.

== Early life ==
Harshad Shantilal Mehta was born on 29 July 1954, into a Jain family in Paneli Moti, Gujarat. His early childhood was spent in Borivali, where his father was a small-time textile businessman.

== Education ==
He did his early study in Janta Public School, Camp 2 Bhilai. A cricket enthusiast, Mehta did not show any special promise in school and came to Mumbai after his schooling for studies and to find work. Mehta completed his B.Com in 1976 from Lala Lajpatrai College, Bombay and worked a number of odd jobs for the next eight years.

== Work and life ==
In his early life, Mehta did jobs often related to sales, including selling hosiery, cement, and sorting diamonds. Mehta started his career as a salesperson in the Mumbai office of New India Assurance Company Limited (NIACL). During this time he became interested in the stock market and after a few days, resigned and joined a brokerage firm. In the early 1980s, he moved to a lower-level clerical job at the brokerage firm Harjivandas Nemidas Securities where he worked a jobber for the broker Prasann Pranjivandas Broker who he considered his "Guru".

Over a period of ten years, beginning 1980, he served in positions of increasing responsibility at a series of brokerage firms. By 1990, he had risen to a position of prominence in the Indian securities industry, with the media (including popular magazines such as Business Today) touting him as "Amitabh Bachchan of the Stock market".

Mehta founded Grow More Research and Asset Management, with the financial assistance of associates, when the BSE auctioned a broker's card and actively started to trade in 1986. By early 1990, a number of eminent people began to invest in his firm and utilize his services. It was at this time that he began trading heavily in the shares of Associated Cement Company (ACC). The price of shares in the cement company eventually rose from ₹200 to nearly ₹9,000 due to a massive spate of buying from a set of brokers including Mehta. Mehta justified this excessive trading in ACC shares by stating that the stock had been undervalued, and that the market had simply corrected when it revalued the company at a price equivalent to the cost of building a similar enterprise; the so-called "replacement cost theory" that he had put forward.

During this period, especially in 1990–1991, the media portrayed a heightened deified image of Mehta, calling him "The Big Bull". He was covered in a cover page article of a number of publications including the popular economic magazine Business Today, in an article titled "Raging Bull". His flashy lifestyle of a sea-facing 15,000 square feet penthouse in the tony area of Worli, complete with a mini golf course and swimming pool, and his fleet of cars including a Toyota Corolla, Lexus LS400, and Toyota Sera were flashed in publications. These further exemplified his image at a time when these were rarities even for the rich people of India.

In criminal indictments later brought by the authorities, it was alleged that Mehta and his associates then undertook a much broader scheme which resulted in manipulating the rise in the Bombay Stock Exchange. The scheme was financed by supposedly collateralised bank receipts, which were in fact uncollateralised. The bank receipts were used in short-term bank-to-bank lending, known as "ready forward" transactions, which Mehta's firm brokered. By the second half of 1991 Mehta had earned the nickname of the "Big Bull", because he was said to have started the bull run in the stock market. Some of the people who worked in his firm included Ketan Parekh, who later would be involved in his own replicate scam.

== Background of the 1992 security fraud ==
=== Bank funds scam ===
Up to the early 90's banks in India were not allowed to invest in the equity markets. However, they were expected to post profits and to retain a certain ratio (threshold) of their assets in government fixed interest bonds. Mehta cleverly squeezed capital out of the banking system to address this requirement of banks and pumped this money into the share market. He also promised the banks higher rates of interest, while asking them to transfer the money into his personal account, under the guise of buying securities for them from other banks. At that time, a bank had to go through a broker to buy securities and forward bonds from other banks. Mehta used this money temporarily in his account to buy shares, thus hiking up demand of certain shares (of good established companies like ACC, Sterlite Industries and Videocon) dramatically, selling them off, passing on a part of the proceeds to the bank and kept the rest for himself. This resulted in stocks like ACC, which was trading in 1991 for ₹200/share, skyrocketing to nearly ₹9,000 in just 3 months.

=== Bank receipt fraud ===
Another instrument used in a big way was the bank receipt. In a ready forward deal, securities were not moved back and forth in actuality. Instead, the borrower, i.e. the seller of securities, gave the buyer of the securities a BR. The BR serves as a receipt from the selling bank, and also promises that the buyer will receive the securities they have paid for at the end of the terms.

Having figured this out, Mehta needed banks, which could issue fake BRs, or BRs not backed by any government securities.

Once these fake BRs were issued, they were passed on to other banks and the banks in turn gave money to Mehta, plainly assuming that they were lending against government securities when this was not really the case. He took the price of ACC from ₹200 to ₹9,000 (an increase of 4,400%). Since he had to book profits in the end, the day he sold was the day when the markets crashed.

=== Outbreak of 1992 securities fraud ===
On 23 April 1992, journalist Sucheta Dalal exposed illegal methods in a column in The Times of India. Mehta was dipping illegally into the banking system to finance his buying.

A typical ready forward deal involved two banks brought together by a broker in lieu of a commission. The broker handles neither the cash nor the securities, though that was not the case in the lead-up to the fraud. In this settlement process, deliveries of securities and payments were made through the broker. That is, the seller handed over the securities to the broker, who passed them to the buyer, while the buyer gave the cheque to the broker, who then made the payment to the seller. In this settlement process, the buyer and the seller might not even know with whom they had traded, either being known only to the broker. This the brokers could manage primarily because by now they had become market makers and had started trading on their account. To keep up a semblance of legality, they pretended to be undertaking the transactions on behalf of a bank.

Mehta used forged BRs to gain unsecured loans, and used several small banks to issue BRs on demand. Once these fake BRs were issued, they were passed on to other banks and the banks in turn gave money to Mehta, mistakenly believing that they were lending against government securities. This money was used to drive up the prices of stocks in the stock market. When time came to return the money, the shares were sold for a profit and the BR was retired. The money due to the bank was returned.

This went on as long as the stock prices rose, and no one knew about Mehta's operations. Once the fraud was exposed, though, many banks were left holding worthless BRs – the banking system had been swindled out of ₹40 billion (equivalent to ₹340 billion or US$3.6 billion in 2026). They knew that they would be accused if people discovered his involvement in issuing cheques to Mehta. Subsequently, it transpired that Citibank, brokers like Pallav Sheth and Ajay Kayan, industrialists like Aditya Birla, Hemendra Kothari, a number of politicians, and the RBI Governor S.Venkitaramanan all had allowed or facilitated Mehta's market manipulation.

== Death ==
Harshad was under criminal custody in the Thane prison. He complained of chest pain late at night and was admitted to the Thane Civil Hospital. He died following a brief heart ailment, at the age of 47, on 31 December 2001. Some believe Mehta was murdered by underworld, adding that a person allegedly associated with the nexus surrendered just days after Mehta was moved to Thane jail and was jailed in the cell next to the cell where Mehta was kept.

He died with many litigations still pending against him. Altogether, he had 28 cases registered against him. The trial of all except one, are still continuing in various courts in the country. Market watchdog, Securities and Exchange Board of India, had banned him for life from stock market-related activities.

== In popular culture ==
=== Books ===
- Mehta's life and his 1992 scam are covered in great detail by Sucheta Dalal and Debashis Basu in their book The Scam: from Harshad Mehta To Ketan Parekh.

=== Films and television ===
- Scam 1992, streaming on SonyLIV and produced by Applause Entertainment is based on his life, which was inspired from Sucheta Dalal's book The Scam. Actor Pratik Gandhi played Mehta. It is one of the highest rated television shows in the world on IMDb.
- The character Natwar Shah in movie Aankhein (1993), placed under scanner for a multi-crore scandal, was inspired by Harshad Mehta.
- The Mehta scandal was portrayed in the Hindi movie, Gafla. It was premiered in Times BFI 50th London Film Festival on 18 October 2006.
- Harshad Mehta was mentioned in the 2018 TV show Yeh Un Dinon Ki Baat Hai based on 1990s' Ahmedabad.
- The Mehta scandal was portrayed in the Hindi Webseries, The Bull Of Dalal Street. It was premiered in Ullu App on 21 February 2020.
- A Bollywood film The Big Bull (2021), starring Abhishek Bachchan, loosely based on his life and financial crimes.
- A Telugu film Lucky Baskhar (2024), starring Dulquer Salmaan, makes several references to Mehta and the 1992 scam.

== See also ==
- Ramalinga Raju
- Hasan Ali Khan
- List of scandals in India
