= Hasan Ali Khan =

Indian businessman (died 2023)

- Born: c. 1951; Hyderabad, Hyderabad State, India
- Died: 23 February 2023 (aged 71); Hyderabad, Telangana, India
- Known for: Hawala

Hasan Ali Khan (c. 1951 – 23 February 2023) was an Indian businessman. In 2007, Indian authorities began investigating Khan on suspicion of money laundering. He had a Swiss bank account with $8 billion in deposits. He allegedly stashed away billions into Swiss bank accounts with the help of Kolkata-based businessman Kashinath Tapuriah and Delhi-based Praveen Kumar using hawala.

In January 2011, the then Finance Minister of India, Pranab Mukherjee, announced that both Swiss bank accounts of Hasan Ali Khan were emptied. In December 2012, Finance Ministry told the parliamentary Standing Committee on Finance that recovery of Hasan Ali's tax arrears (of approximately ₹ 910 billion) was not possible.

In October 2013, it was reported that Hasan Ali would remain in jail after his bail petitions had been rejected several times by various courts including the Bombay High Court and the Supreme Court of India.

Hasan Ali denied all the allegations and said he had no Swiss bank accounts and some of his rivals could be behind the charges.

== Legal cases ==
In March 2007, Hasan Ali's properties were raided by India's Enforcement Directorate (ED) and Income Tax officials based on allegations of hawala transactions. Hasan Ali's lawyer denied all the allegations and said he had no Swiss bank accounts and some of his rivals could be behind the charges.

The Supreme Court of India intervened and asked why Khan and others were not interrogated despite sufficient evidence against them. After this criticism, Khan was arrested by ED in March 2011. In May 2011, ED formally chargesheeted Khan and his associate Kashinath Tapuriah under the Prevention of Money Laundering Act, 2002. ED lawyers said Khan had laundered money for international arms dealer Adnan Khashoggi on several occasions. Khan claimed that he was framed.

Khan was charged with serving as a front for Khashoggi. Allegedly, in 2003, Khan helped launder through the Zurich branch of Swiss bank UBS US$300 million Khashoggi had made through arms sales. Khashoggi reportedly had to use Khan as a front as UBS had blackballed him due to his notoriety. Introduced to UBS by Khashoggi in 1982, Khan enabled the arms dealer to launder funds held in American accounts through UBS Geneva. One of Khan's accounts eventually was blocked when it was determined that the source of the funds came from Khashoggi's arms sales.

India Today magazine claimed that it had verified a letter confirming that $8 billion in black money was in a Swiss bank UBS account and the Government of India too had verified this with UBS. However, the Swiss bank UBS denied Indian media reports alleging that it maintained a business relationship with or had any assets or accounts for Hasan Ali Khan accused in the $8 billion black money case. Upon formal request by Indian and Swiss government authorities, the bank announced that the documentation supposedly corroborating such allegations was forged and numerous media reports claiming $8 billion in stashed black money were false.

India Today, in a later article, wrote, "Hasan Ali Khan stands accused of massive tax evasion and stashing money in secret bank accounts abroad. But the problem is that the law enforcement agencies have precious little evidence to back their claims. For one, UBS Zurich has already denied having any dealings with Khan." Indian government has asked the Indian mission in Bern to get in touch with banking authorities of Switzerland for obtaining details about Hasan Ali Khan's Swiss bank accounts. Hasan Ali named Praful Patel during hawala interrogation. He was also friends with Congress leader Jagdish Tytler, ex-Samajwadi Party leader & actress Jaya Prada, former Chief Minister of Andhra Pradesh & Congress leader, Vijay Bhaskar Reddy, & film financier Yusuf Lakdawala.

Khan died in Hyderabad on 23 February 2023, at the age of 71. By that trial of any of the charges against him had yet begun.
