= Circular trading =

Type of securities fraud

Circular trading is a type of securities fraud that can take place in stock markets, causing price manipulation and often related to pump and dump schemes. Circular trading occurs when identical buy and sell orders are entered at the same time with the same number of shares and the same price. As a result, there is no change in ownership of shares, but there is the appearance of an increased trade volume. Circular trading can be achieved by several parties colluding to achieve the fraudulent outcome. This is not to be confused with wash trading, which is where the same outcome is achieved but occurs through the actions of one investor, rather than a group.

Circular trading is based on the premise that trading volume has a direct impact on share price. Trading volume increases are widely regarded as a signal that something important is happening within a company, such as a new product or a change in management that may be soon announced. Due to this, investors buy shares in order to take advantage of the expected increase in share value. This increases the value of the shares, causing them to become overvalued. Circular trading is fraudulent because the signal that investors receive to buy shares has no basis in reality and is made with the sole purpose of creating interest where none is warranted.

Therefore, this fraudulent practice is widely considered unethical and is banned in many countries. This issue is most prevalent in India, where companies such as Videocon Industries Ltd had their shares devalued fraudulently by the Brokers Mansukh Securities and Finance Ltd. and Intec Shares and Stock Brokers Ltd.

Circular trading has become a particularly important issue since the advent of high-frequency trading in the 1990s, which allows large investors and investor groups to perform an extremely high number of automated transactions in a short period of time. Powerful computers can be used to buy and sell shares in single stocks at immensely more rapid rates than humans can achieve manually. Consequently, creating the appearance of high trading volumes has become much easier, particularly in large companies where a very large number of transactions is required to simulate a realistic level of activity.

== Market consequences ==
In the most common form of circular trading, groups of investors fraudulently inflate the share price of a company, then sell the shares they own for a profit. While this is illegal, the market consequences are usually minimal. Less frequently, circular trading is used to directly impact a company's success or failure.

In some cases, shareholders set thresholds for the price of shares at which they will stay invested within a company or leave it or set a price threshold at which they will decide to purchase more shares. Shareholders tend to follow the decisions of those around them; consequently, the departure of a small number of influential shareholders may pose a risk to the overall health of the company. When these thresholds have become reasonably well defined, circular traders may manipulate the stock prices to always stay on the side of the price threshold which is in their best interests, regardless of the real value of the shares.

Circular trading can also have severe market consequences in relation to Initial Public Offerings (IPOs). A significant factor in the success of an IPO is the level of buzz and hype surrounding it. Efforts to fraudulently manipulate that level of excitement may cause companies to become significantly overvalued. As a result, companies which initially appear to be full of potential become over-hyped and inevitably find themselves with demands and expectations which they cannot fulfill; consequently, initial investors lose their investment when the company fails, and confidence in the stock market, in general, is weakened.

Beyond the broad-reaching market consequences, the consequences for private individuals who invest in the stock market are also significant. Individuals may spend more money on shares than they are worth. Regardless of whether they make a profit on the shares in the long term, their initial overpayment in purchasing the shares remains a detriment. When instances of circular trading are discovered, changes in consumer confidence often spread through the entirety of the stock market, and public trust in the stock markets as a whole is eroded.

== Examples ==
Circular trading has been most prevalent in India, with the majority of high-profile cases originating in the Indian stock market. The first case to receive public attention was that of Ketan Parekh, a stockbroker who was found guilty of a major stock market scam dating back to 1999. This was largely based on circular trading, although insider trading was also a significant component. There were seven companies acting in union to illegally manipulate the market. They illegally bought shares in companies leading up to the date of their IPO's, effectively driving the share value up, before offloading the shares directly after the IPO, artificially inflating a company's value so as to mislead investors about the value and popularity of particular IPOs. When the scam was discovered, Parekh was barred from acting within the Indian stock exchange until the year 2017. The case of Parekh has gained notoriety because he was found violating the ban on his involvement in the Indian stock exchange. A 2012 report found that Parekh was not only still active in the Indian Stock Exchange, but he was also continually engaging in serious violations of the law, including insider trading and circular trading. In April 2012, Parekh colluded with his Singapore-based associate Akshay Natra, executing several synchronised trades in the shares of Nifty Bank. Through this use of circular trading, these individuals gained an illegitimate profit of approximately 10,000,000 Indian rupees.

Another case occurred in 2001 when the Securities and Exchange Board of India (SEBI) discovered that Angel Broking had been creating artificial trade volume in the shares of Sun Infoways Ltd for a period of approximately one month between February and March of that year. Angel Broking worked with three lesser-known brokerages to achieve this. The targeted shares were being traded between the prices of 296 and 342 Indian Rupees during the period the circular trading was active before dropping as low as 61 Indian rupees in the following month when the publicly visible trading volume became legitimate.

Another case that received public attention was the barring of Shankar Sharma in 2009 from the Indian stock exchange for a period of one year. Sharma was involved in circular trading through his position as Joint managing director of First Global Stock Broking Limited.

Aside from that of Ketan Parekh, the most significant case of circular trading was when SEBI barred 16 people from trading on the Indian stock market for circular trading in 2010. They were barred from buying, selling and dealing in securities on the market and had their bank accounts frozen. This was in response to proof that these individuals had created an artificially high volume in the market through synchronised trading among themselves. Numerous large companies that were well known in India were targeted—Marvens Biotech, Rasi Electrodes, Sat Industries, KSL & Industries, Asian Star Co, Allcargo Global Logistics, Panoramic Universal, and Ushdev International. This case created a large scandal in India because the use of circular trading caused investors to lose faith in the accuracy of share prices on the Indian stock market, which affects many more companies than just those specifically targeted. Following this, in 2012, SEBI imposed a penalty of 200,000 Indian Rupees on the brokers involved.

== Responses ==
Methods for preventing circular trading have been in development since the outbreak of high-profile cases in India, starting in 2010. In India, SEBI has begun using several methods aimed at preventing this fraudulent practice. This is done through increasing regulation on the stock market in a way that restricts trading high volumes of stocks in short amounts of time. One such method includes a price band, which is a range of prices which is set for a day, and specific stocks can only be sold within the price range on that day. As of 2018, SEBI has imposed a 10% price band for all stocks on the market. However, they can restrict genuine price movements that may occur in companies when important events occur, such as a change in management. Especially in the case of speculative companies, such as mining companies which experience a sharp spike in share price following a successful resource find, the price bands can severely dampen the genuine growth which is relied upon in these instances. As a result, SEBI has reportedly been considering varying the price bands based on industries and specific companies to avoid these issues.

There are also inter-week price bands which restrict price movements over a week, with a larger variation of 25% being allowed to prevent large swings in price from having a direct impact for over more than one trading period. Margins have also been introduced, requiring that for each transaction that a broker orders, they must also deposit a small amount to the stock exchange. This is essentially a transaction charge that disincentivises brokers from placing orders unnecessarily. Without a transaction charge, groups could trade shares amongst themselves many times at no cost with no change in real ownership while still creating the appearance of trade volume. Although circular trading is still possible, it has a charge which cannot be avoided.

In addition to these institutional measures which seek to make circular trading more difficult, there is also a field of academic research that is seeking ways to detect circular trading in a faster and more accurate manner than is currently possible. Although not the direct focus, the work of Palshikar et al. and Zhou et al. in 2008 and 2013 respectively has provided the basis for this in their research on the relationship between circular trading and trading networks, as well as early methods of detecting trader collusion. In 2018, Ramin Salahshoor published a paper demonstrating success in detecting circular trading using a network-based approach, based on data from the Iran Mercantile Exchange. This was achieved by constructing networks of daily trades by several separate traders, then analysing trade cycles of various lengths from these networks. Salahshoor was able to group traders from each day into groups of traders who were engaged in suspicious cycles that were indicators of circular trading and traders who were acting legitimately. This was possible because of the nature of herding in stock markets. Salahshoor noted that when the circular traders inflated the share price, they were effectively herding a larger number of legitimate investors into also buying these shares. By analysing which investors were commonly the instigators of this herd mentality, Salahshoor was able to identify which traders were acting illegitimately. Salahshoor also factored in price fluctuations over time so that randomly generated suspicious cycles were eliminated from the analysis. Prior to this breakthrough, circular trading was only detectable through initial guesswork and intuition based on discrepancies between the level of trade volume recorded and what should be expected, as well as rapid changes in trade volume that did not have any obvious cause in the real-world situation. Salahshoor's method has had success in identifying circular traders in Iran. Further research in this area may lead to methods that will allow for the increasingly swift and accurate identification of circular traders in various types of markets. This is particularly important, considering that circular traders are only ever brought to justice after significant market damage has already occurred.
