= Ketan Parekh =

Indian stockbroker

Ketan Parekh is a former stockbroker from Mumbai, who was convicted in 2008 for involvement in the Indian stock market manipulation scam that occurred from late 1998 to 2001. During this period, Parekh artificially rigged prices of certain chosen securities (informally referred to as K-10 stocks), using large sums of money borrowed from banks including the Madhavpura Mercantile Co-operative Bank, of which he himself was a director.

After many investigations by the Securities and Exchange Board of India, Parekh and his front entities were found guilty of rigging share prices of ten companies called K-10 and SEBI had banned Parekh and associated firms from trading in the market for 14 years.

In 2025, Parekh was banned from the market by the SEBI due to his alleged involvement in a front running scam.

== Early career ==
Parekh, after becoming a Chartered Accountant, started his career in the late 1980s at Narbheram Harakchand Securities (NH Securities), a reputed institutional brokerage firm. In the 90s, he came in contact with Harshad Mehta, a well known stock broker and subsequently joined Mehta's firm GrowMore investments, a firm that Mehta had set up and which was involved in the 1992 Indian stock market scam. As cover stories emerged in the financial media of his malpractices related to the stock market, scrutiny shifted to his activities leading to his arrest on 30 March 2001.

== Role in 2001 stock market crash ==
Ketan Parekh purchased small stakes in less known small market capitalization companies, and jacked up their prices through circular trading with other traders, and collusion with these companies and large institutional investors. This resulted in steep hikes in share prices (for example: shares of Zee telefilms zoomed up from Rs 127 to a price of Rs 10,000. This set of ten stocks was colloquially referred to as "K-10" stocks and Parekh was playfully referred to as "Pentafour Bull".

It later transpired that promoters and industrialists often gave Parekh funds to artificially rig up their share prices. Thus in just a few months, scrips of virtually unknown companies like Visualsoft rose from ₹625 to ₹8,448 per share and Sonata Software rose from ₹90 to ₹2,936.60. However, the bear cartel in Bombay stock exchange started to hammer his K-10 stocks in February 2001, leading them to fall and precipitating a payment crisis in Calcutta.

On 1 March 2001, just after the Indian Union Budget had been presented, the BSE Sensex crashed 176 points, prompting the then NDA government to set up an inquiry into the market reaction. Subsequently the RBI refused to clear pay orders (POs) that had been given by Parekh as collateral for loans to BOI (Bank of India), as they found them to be suspicious. The RBI commenced an investigation against Parekh. Around the same time, a bear cartel of brokers in Mumbai opposed to Parekh tried to dump their shares of K-10 stocks. Panicking, Parekh sold off his entire ownership of the so called K-10 stocks that he had successfully jacked up over the past two years, especially those of two entities - GTB bank and MMCB bank. He carried out this large scale dump in the evening, after regular trading hours, from 5 PM to midnight at the Calcutta Stock Exchange. This resulted in a stock market crash the next day, resulting in large scale losses for large institutional investors, including insurance companies and mutual funds.

A 30 member Joint Parliamentary Committee (JPC) investigation ensued which found that Parekh had been involved in circular trading throughout the time period from and with a variety of companies, including Global Trust Bank (GTB) and Madhavpura Mercantile Cooperative Bank (MMCB). The JPC found him to have played a major role in rigging the prices of a set of ten Indian companies, from 1995 up to 2001.

This resulted in Parekh's first conviction, which carried a one-year sentence, coming as a result of a transaction he conducted involving a unit of Canara Bank in 1992.

Though Parekh was subsequently barred from stock trading, the Securities and Exchange Board of India alleged in 2009 that a variety of companies and other actors were trading on behalf of Parekh. An investigation ensued and 26 entities were banned from trading as a result of that investigation. In March 2014 he was convicted by a special CBI court in Bombay for cheating and sentenced to two years rigorous imprisonment.

== 2025 scam ==
In January 2025, Parekh was banned by SEBI from trading after the agency found his involvement in a front-trading running scam.

== In popular culture ==
2006 Hindi movie Gafla depicted him.

== See also ==
- Rakesh Jhunjhunwala, Indian investor
- Calcutta Stock Exchange
