= 2005 in India =

- Centuries: 19th; 20th; 21st
- Decades: 1980s; 1990s; 2000s; 2010s; 2020s
- See also: List of years in India; Timeline of Indian history

Events in the year 2005 in the Republic of India.

== Incumbents ==
Post	Name
(India) President	A.P.J Abdul Kalam
(India) Vice President	Bhairon Singh Shekhawat
(India) Prime Minister	Manmohan Singh
(India) Chief Justice	Ramesh Chandra Lahoti until 1 November, succeeded by Yogesh Kumar Sabharwal

=== Governors ===
Post	Name
(India) Andhra Pradesh	Sushilkumar Shinde
(India) Arunachal Pradesh	Shilendra Kumar Singh
(India) Assam	Ajai Singh
(India) Bihar	Buta Singh
(India) Chhattisgarh	Krishna Mohan Seth
(India) Goa	S. C. Jamir
(India) Gujarat	Nawal Kishore Sharma
(India) Haryana	Akhlaqur Rahman Kidwai
(India) Himachal Pradesh	Vishnu Sadashiv Kokje
(India) Jammu and Kashmir	Syed Sibtey Razi
(India) Jharkhand	S. K. Sinha
(India) Karnataka	T. N. Chaturvedi
(India) Kerala	R. L. Bhatia
(India) Madhya Pradesh	Balram Jakhar
(India) Maharashtra	S.M. Krishna
(India) Manipur	Shivinder Singh Sidhu
(India) Meghalaya	M.M. Jacob
(India) Mizoram	Amolak Rattan Kohli
(India) Nagaland	Shyamal Datta
(India) Odisha	Rameshwar Thakur
(India) Punjab	Sunith Francis Rodrigues
(India) Rajasthan	Pratibha Patil
(India) Sikkim	V. Rama Rao
(India) Tamil Nadu	Surjit Singh Barnala
(India) Tripura	Dinesh Nandan Sahay
(India) Uttar Pradesh	T. V. Rajeswar
(India) Uttarakhand	Sudarshan Agarwal
(India) West Bengal	Gopalkrishna Gandhi

== Events ==
- National income - ₹36,321,247 million

=== January - June ===
- Kerala State Horticulture Mission is founded.
- 10 January – The Delhi High Court says that a "high claim ratio" cannot be grounds to turn down medical insurance contract renewal requests. The court said that medical policies were liable to be renewed on the same terms and conditions as the old ones. However, insurance companies could load the premium to a limited extent if high payments were sought by a consumer.
- 23 January – In line with the suggestions of the Supreme Court, the Election Commission asks the chief electoral officers of Bihar, Jharkhand and Haryana to do videography of proceedings inside polling stations without violating the secrecy of vote.
- 25 January – A stampede at the Mandher Devi temple, Satara district during a religious pilgrimage in India kills at least 215, mostly women and children.
- 29 January – The Bharatiya Janata Party (BJP)-led government in Goa headed by Manohar Parrikar is reduced to a minority after four BJP MLAs resign from the 40-member house. While the Indian National Congress has staked its claim to form the new government, Parrikar has said he will prove his majority.
- 29 January – Former BJP president Venkaiah Naidu's helicopter is set on fire by suspected Maoists during his campaign tour of Gaya, Bihar. Naidu escapes unhurt.
- 10 March – TRAI (Telecom Regulatory Authority of India) slashes tariffs for international bandwidth prices by up to 70% with effect from 1 April.
- 16 March – Ripudaman Singh Malik and Ajaib Singh Bagri, accused of the bombing of Air India Flight 182 in 1985, are found not guilty on all counts.
- March - A Muslim cattle trader Hasanabba and his son were assaulted by Cow vigilante in Mangalore.
- 25 April – The National Consumer Disputes Redressal Commission in a landmark judgement rules that hospitals are duty bound to accept accident victims, that patients in critical condition and that doctors cannot first demand fees before agreeing to treat the patient and that a relative's consent is not necessary if there is no family member present at the time.
- 21 May – International Direct Dialling to countries in the Gulf, the SAARC region, Saudi Arabia, Africa, Australia and New Zealand will cost Rs. 12 a minute, down by 33%.
- 24 May – The maiden domestic flight operation of SpiceJet in New Delhi – Mumbai route.
- 6 June – Imrana rape case.

=== July - December ===
- 26 July – Mumbai and the Mumbai Conurbation area is submerged in 5–7 ft. of water due to heavy rains, making nearby dams release water causing a massive flood, which virtually stops the financial capital of India for 4–5 days.
- 23 August - Mahatma Gandhi National Rural Employment Guarantee Act, 2005 enacted, ensuring 100 days employment guarantee for every Indian.
- 30 August – Removal of License Requirements for Exports of Controlled Items to India, Federal Register.
- September – A high-level United States defence team for the first time gives a classified detailed briefing to Indian officials on the patriot PAC-III anti-missile system, its capabilities against weapons of mass destruction and on the sensitive technologies of the F-18/A hornet and F-16 fighter jets.
- 9 September – A group of Lashkar-e-Taiba sympathizers hijacked and burnt a Tamil Nadu State Transport Corporation bus near Kalamassery, Kerala in retaliation to long detention of Abdul Nazer Mahdani at Coimbatore Jail.
- 29 October – A train in Andhra Pradesh, derails, killing at least 77 people.
- 29 October – At least 61 people are dead and many others wounded in three powerful blasts in Delhi (See 29 October 2005 Delhi bombings for full details).
- 19 November - Shanmugam Manjunath a Whistle Blowers working in Indian Oil Corporation murdered in Lakhimpur Kheri district Uttar Pradesh.
- 21 November – An Indian social worker, Junned Khan, and his NGO, pratham society for vulnerable children, with the help of Delhi Police and Delhi Labour Department, rescued 487 trafficked child labour from illegal factories of North shahadara area in Eastern part of Delhi.
- 22 November – Nitish Kumar defeated Rashtriya Janata Dal in the Bihar state election.
- 26 November – Death of Sohrabuddin Sheikh.
- 29 December – Firing, possibly a terrorist attack, at IISC, Bangalore campus.

== Births ==
- 23 January – 20th Kushok Bakula Rinpoche
- 18 June - Sara Arjun
- 10 August - R Praggnanandhaa
- 9 December - Divya Deshmukh

== Deaths ==
- 3 January – Jyotindra Nath Dixit, diplomat and politician (born 1936).
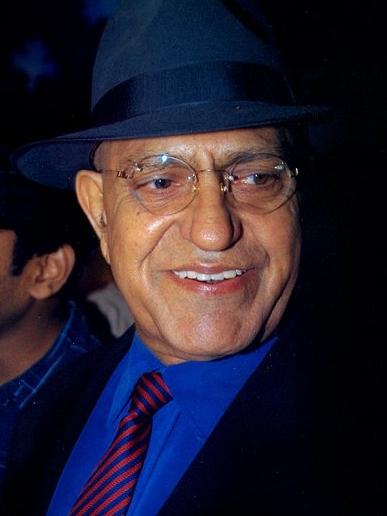
- Amrish Puri
  12 January – Amrish Puri, actor (born 1932).
- 20 January – Parveen Babi, actress (born 1949).
- 3 March – Raveendran also known as Raveendran master, Malayalam and South Indian music composer (born 1943).
- 22 March – Gemini Ganesan, actor (born 1920).
- 25 April – Swami Ranganathananda, President of Ramakrishna Math (born 1908).
- 3 May – Jagjit Singh Aurora, military commander (born 1916).
- 15 May – Mahipal, actor (born 1919).
- 21 May – Subodh Mukherjee, filmmaker (born 1921).
- 25 May – Ismail Merchant, film producer (born 1936).
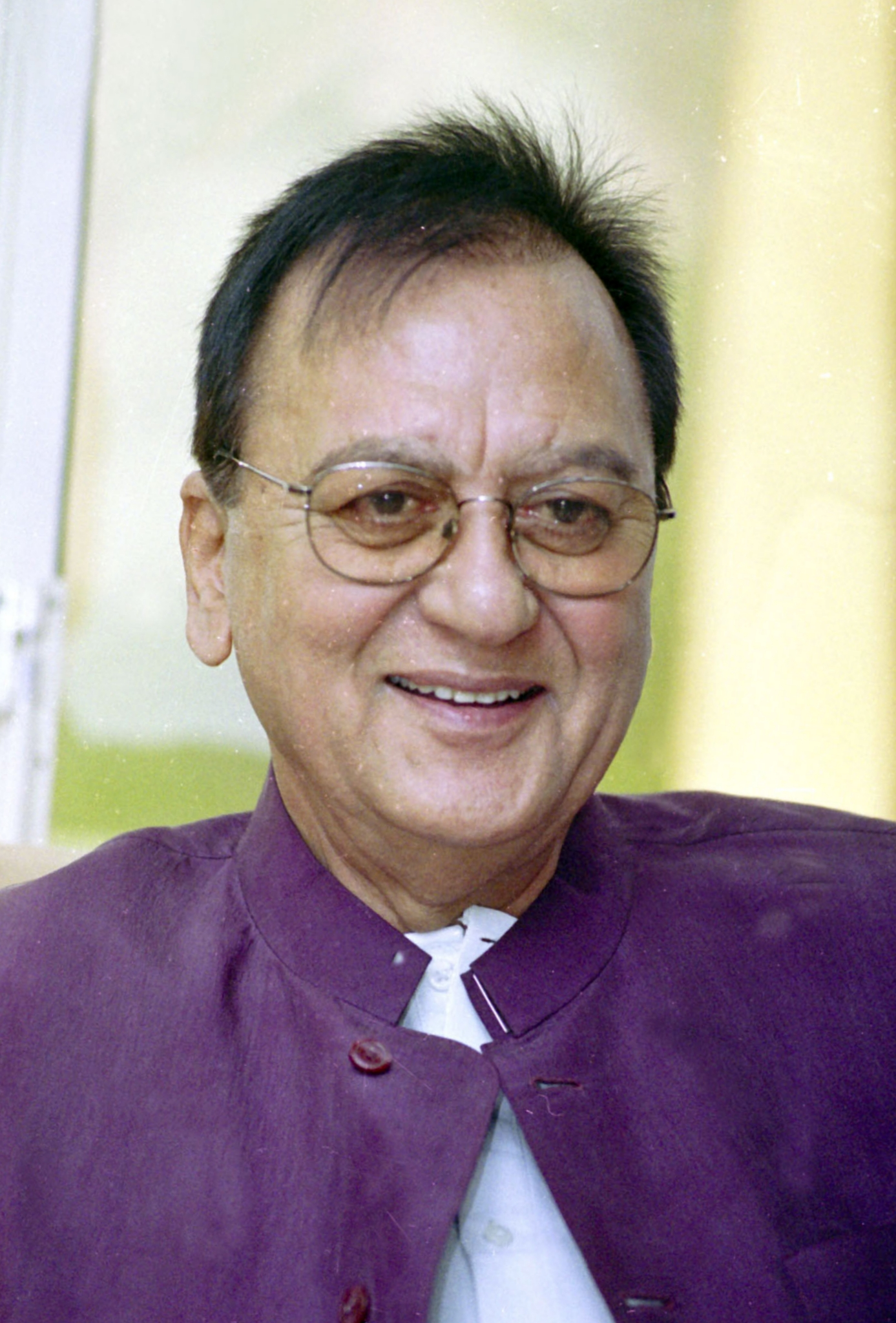
- Sunil Dutt
  25 May – Sunil Dutt, actor, producer, director and politician (born 1929).
- 23 July – C R Irani, journalist and editor.
- 19 August – O. Madhavan, director and actor (born 1922).
- 31 October – Amrita Pritam, poet, novelist and essayist (born 1919).
- 9 November – K. R. Narayanan, politician and 10th President of India (born 1920).
- 24 November – Jamuna Baruah, actress (born 1919).
- 12 December – Ramanand Sagar, film director (born 1917).

== See also ==
- List of Bollywood films of 2005
