= Kudal (Satara) =

Village in Maharashtra

- village
- Location in Maharashtra, India Kudal (India)
- Coordinates: 17.83557°N 73.91753°E
- Country: India
- State: Maharashtra
- District: Satara

Government
  - Body: Gram panchayat

Population (2001)
  - Total: 21,000

Languages
  - Official: Marathi
- Time zone: UTC+5:30 (IST)
- PIN: 415 514
- Telephone code: 02378
- Vehicle registration: MH-11

Kudal is a village in the Satara district, Maharashtra, India. It is surrounded by a river called Niranjana or Kudali. There is a temple honouring Shree Pimpleshwar and Shree Wakadeshwar on one of the banks of the river. Agriculture is the main land use in the village, with more than 75% of the total area being used for agricultural activities. The village has a close view of the historic Vairatgad Fort. Fifteen other villages neighbour Kudal. Kudal is near to Hill Stations Panchagani(22 kms) and Mahabaleshwar (38 kms).

== Demographics ==
Marathi is the local language. It has a mixed culture of Hindus and Muslims. The village normally shows unity as people from all castes which include Koshti, Maratha, Kumbhar, Nhavi, Gondhali, Matang, Boudhh, Chambar, Mali, Lohar, Shimpi, Bhoi, Vadar, Katvadi and Mang peoples. All clans prominent in Kudal.

== Geography ==
Kudal is a village in Jawali Taluka in Satara District of Maharashtra State, India. It belongs to Desha or Paschim Maharashtra region and to Pune Division. It is located 21 km towards North from district headquarters Satara, 13 km from Jawali, 202 km from state capital Mumbai Kudal. Pin code is 415514 and postal head office is Kudal (Satara). Kalambhe (3 km), Sarjapur (3 km), Mhasve (3 km), Songaon (3 km), Karandoshi (4 km) are the nearby villages to Kudal. Kudal is surrounded by Wai Taluka towards North, Satara Taluka towards South, Khandala Taluka towards North, Mahabaleshwar Taluka towards west. Wai, Satara, Mahabaleswar, Chiplun are the nearby cities.

== Climate and rainfall ==
The climate in general is moderate with temperatures during the summer months (March to mid June) reaching a maximum of 34 °C, and in the winter months (November to March) dropping to 10 °C. The climate is pleasant during the summer, but is very cold during the monsoon. Orelse the climate is moderate for the remaining months. The monsoon period starts in the month of June with the maximum precipitation in July and August. Total rainfall is 3104 mm. The Sahyadri hill ranges -chiefly in Mahabaleshwar tahsil - in the western extremity receive more than 6000 mm. Patan and Jawali tahsils also have rainfall in excess of 2000 mm. Moving eastwards the rainfall amount drops to less than 600 mm in the tahsils of Koregaon, Karad, Satara.

Climate data for Kudal (Satara)
Month	Jan	Feb	Mar	Apr	May	Jun	Jul	Aug	Sep	Oct	Nov	Dec	Year
Mean daily maximum °C (°F)	23.9 (75.0)	25.1 (77.2)	28.9 (84.0)	31.2 (88.2)	31.3 (88.3)	24.2 (75.6)	20.7 (69.3)	20.8 (69.4)	21.3 (70.3)	24.7 (76.5)	23.2 (73.8)	23.1 (73.6)	24.9 (76.8)
Mean daily minimum °C (°F)	14.2 (57.6)	15.3 (59.5)	18.5 (65.3)	20.6 (69.1)	20.1 (68.2)	17.2 (63.0)	17.1 (62.8)	16.4 (61.5)	16.4 (61.5)	17.3 (63.1)	14.7 (58.5)	13.9 (57.0)	16.8 (62.3)
Average precipitation mm (inches)	4.1 (0.16)	1.3 (0.05)	4.8 (0.19)	25.9 (1.02)	43.9 (1.73)	261.1 (10.28)	697.2 (27.45)	404.1 (15.91)	221.5 (8.72)	126.7 (4.99)	66.0 (2.60)	8.4 (0.33)	1,865 (73.43)
Source: Government of Maharashtra

== Infrastructure and development ==
At government offices, Kudal village is recorded as Kasabe Kudal. Kudal has a government hospital, a veterinary hospital and a market place. The village has a gram panchayat (village council) in a three storeyed building which was built by Lt. Shri. Gopalrao Bapuso Shinde, who was the sarapanch of Kudal for fifteen years. The roads here are well made and connect to all the nearby villages and towns. The bridge on the Kudali (निरंजना)river makes passing the river easier for the farmers and transporters.

== Industry ==
The cane sugar mill of Pratapgad Sahakari Sakhar Karkhana Ltd is on the outskirts of Kudal. Pickles, jams, fruit syrup, baking and confectionery, pottery work, Deshi cows milk, ghee and other organic products.

== Dams and irrigation projects ==
Kudali River

The village has two dams on the Kudali river as part of the Kudali Project. The dam at Mahu has a capacity of 1.13 TMC. Its catchment area is 28.62 km^{2} (11.05 sq mi), with a target command area of 17 km^{2} (6.6 sq mi). The dam at Hatgeghar has a catchment area of 7.17 km^{2} (2.77 sq mi), with a target command area of 1.4 km^{2} (0.54 sq mi).

== Agricultural and cropping pattern ==
Major crops (irrigated): are rice, jwari, wheat, chickpeas, sugar cane, groundnuts for 5 to 6 months (except sugar cane).

Major crops (non irrigated): are pearl millet, groundnuts for 3 to 4 months.

Major cash crops: cultivated are soyabean and sugar for around 12 to 16 months.

Major plantations: fodder development and mixed planting goes on throughout the year

There is also a wide cultivation of fruits like strawberries, raspberries (locally known as tutu), mangoes and bananas. Also now starts chemical free food with cows fertilizers, and Goshala for organic farming.

== Transport ==
There is no railway station closer than 10 km. Satara and Jarandeshwar Stations (near to Satara) are reachable. The nearest major station is Pune Junction (86 km).

National Highway 4 from Panchwad is close to the village. Mahabaleswar, Satara, Panchgani are nearby towns with road connections.
