= Kondhawali =

Village in Maharashtra

Coordinates: 17°57′50″N 73°46′2″E

Kondhawali, also written Kondhavale or Kondhavali, is a village in the Satara District of Maharashtra state, India.

== Geography ==
Kondhawali is located at around 33 km from Wai, Maharashtra, in western India.

The village is surrounded by the mountainous region of the Sahyādris. It is considered one of the more popular locations for shooting films, as it is surrounded by water of Dhom Dam on one side and the Hills of Kamalgad on the other. Kondhawali is situated on the Krishna River.

== Demographics ==
According to 2011 census in India, Kondhawali had a population of 257.

== History ==
Kondhawali was birthplace of Jiva Mahale (bodyguard of Shivaji) who saved Shivaji from Afzal Khan at the Battle of Pratapgad.

== Religion ==
There are five major temples in the village

- Shree Bhairavanaath Temple
- Hanuman Temple
- Shree Datta Mandir
- Siddheshwar Mandir
- Gorakshanath Mandir

== Special highlights ==
- Kamalgad
- Krishna River
- Ram krishna hari ashram

== Gallery ==
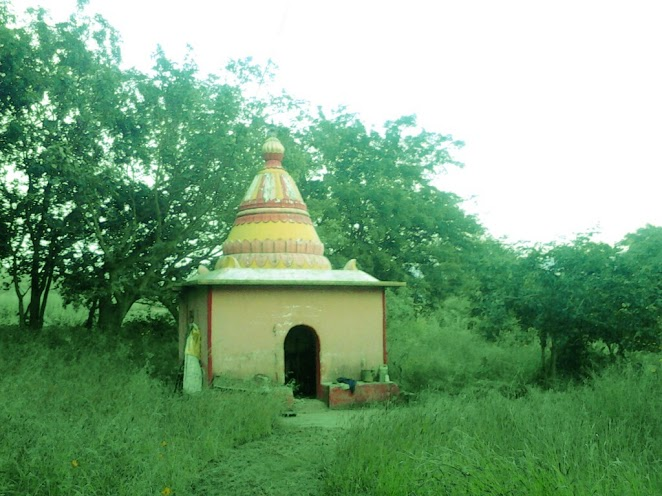
Beauty at winter

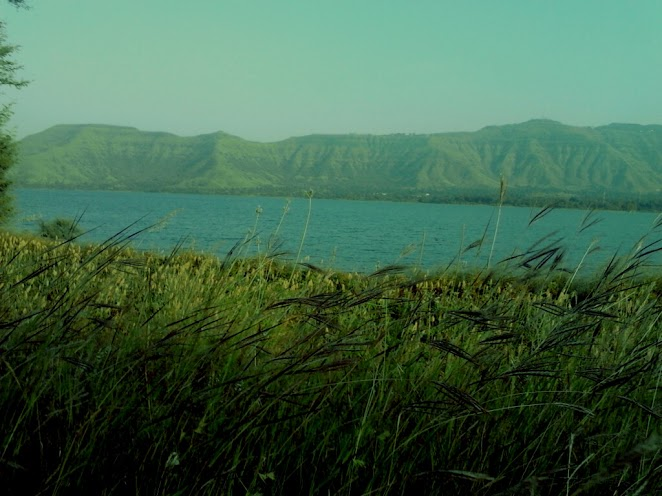
Krishna River

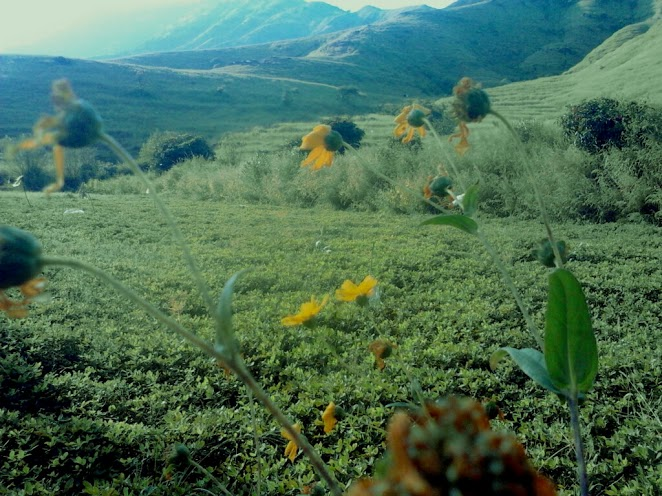
Beauty at winter

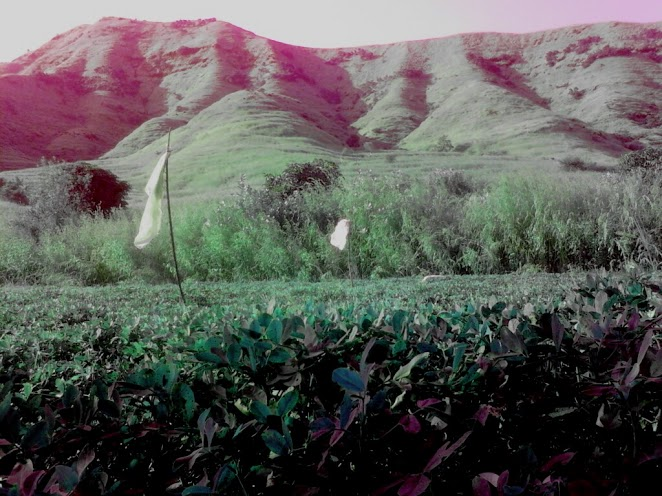
Beauty at winter

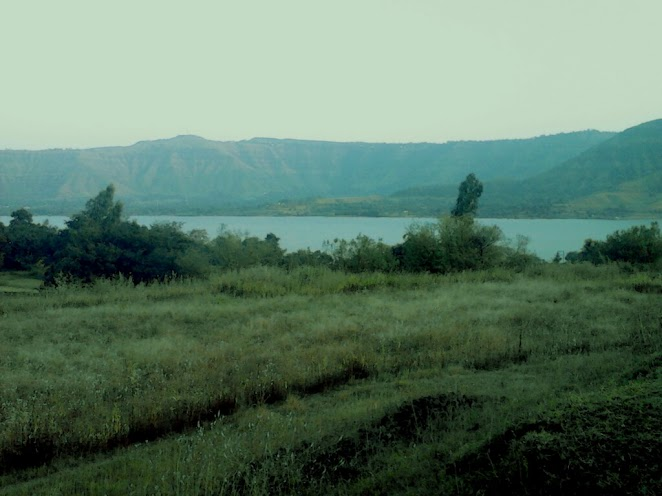
Beauty at winter

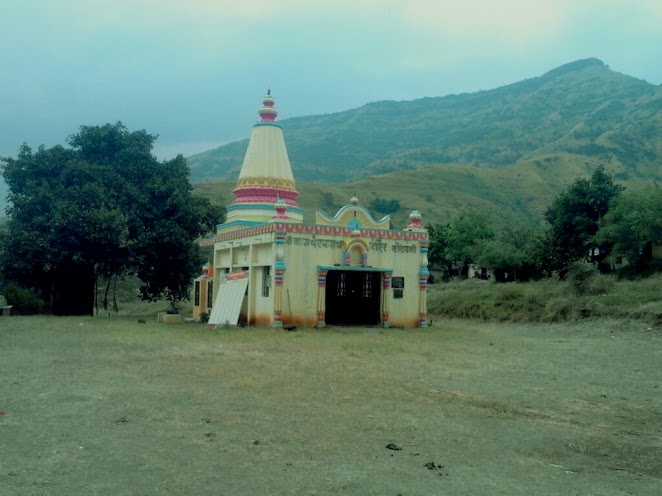
Beauty at winter
