= R. G. Jadhav =

R. G. Jadhav (August 24, 1932 – May 27, 2016) was a Marathi literary critic from Maharashtra, India.

For some years, he served as a professor of Marathi literature, first in a college in Amravati, then in Elphinstone College in Mumbai, and lastly in Milind College in Aurangabad. He next joined the staff of Marathi Vishwakosh (मराठी विश्वकोश) in Wai, and worked in that institution for two decades. During 2001-02, he served as the chairman and chief editor of Vishwakosh. One of his written lessons, "शाल", is published in 10th Marathi textbook. He is a renowned writer.

Jadhav presided over Marathi Sahitya Sammelan at Aurangabad in 2004.
