= Dahyat =

Village in Maharashtra

- village
- Interactive map of Dahyat
- Country: India
- State: Maharashtra
- District: Satara district
- Talukas: Wai

Languages
  - Official: Marathi
- Time zone: UTC+5:30 (IST)

Dahyat is a village in Satara district in the Indian state of Maharashtra.It is situated on the banks of the River Krishna.It is about 21 km from Wai, Maharashtra.

== Demographics ==
As of 2011 India census, Dahyat had a population of 541 in 120 households. Male and female both constitutes 50% of the population. Dahyat has an average literacy rate of 69%, lower than the national average of 74%: male literacy is 57.7%, and female literacy is 42.2%. In Dahyat, 9.6% of the population is under 6 years of age.

== Temples ==
There are 3 major temples in Dahyat:

- Ram Mandir
- Janni Deul
- Bhairoba Mandir
- Mariaai Deul

== Special Highlights ==
- River Krishna
- Kamalgad
- Gothmi hill
- Vetal hill

== Gallery ==
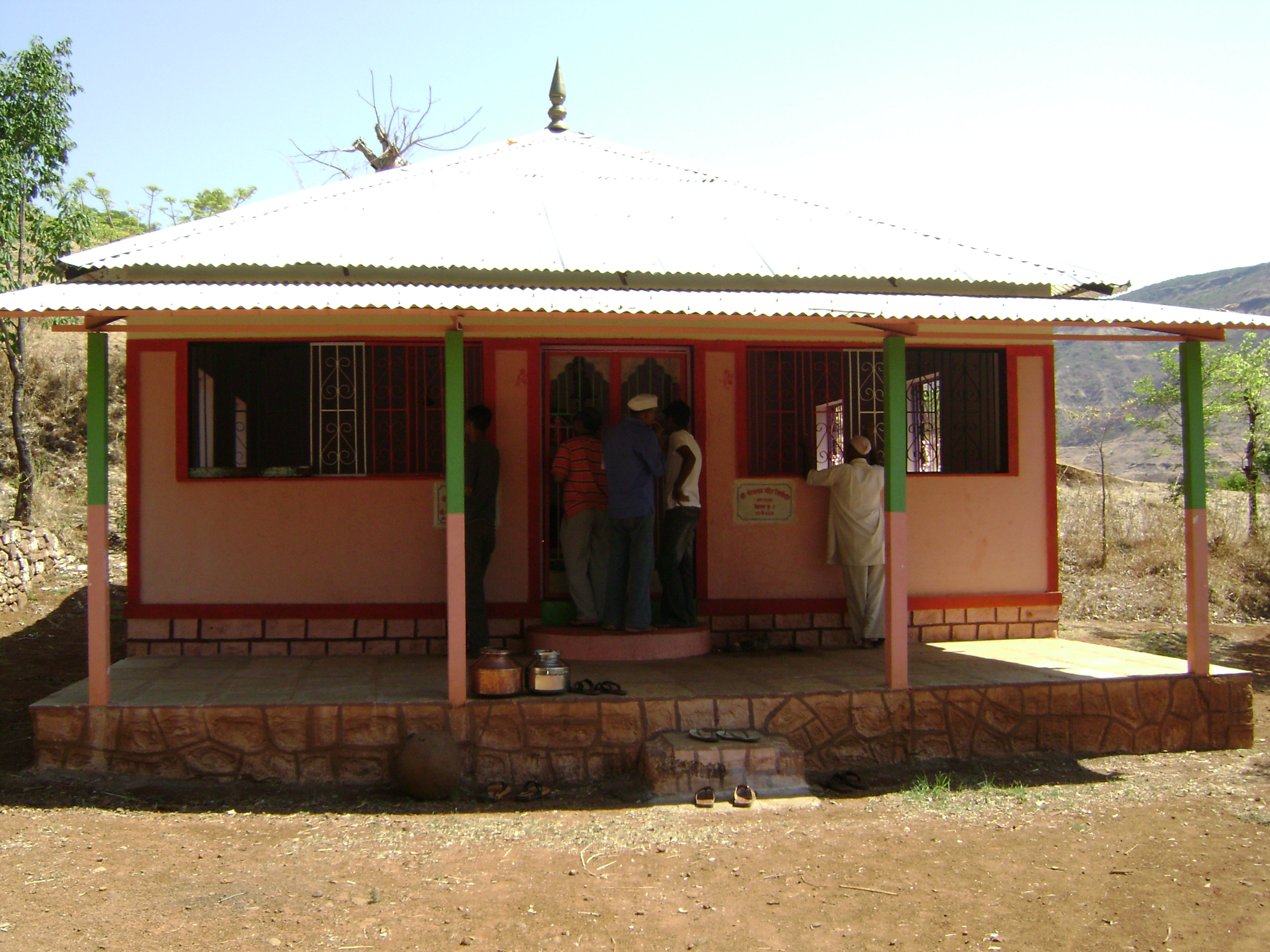
Bhairoba temple in Dahyat

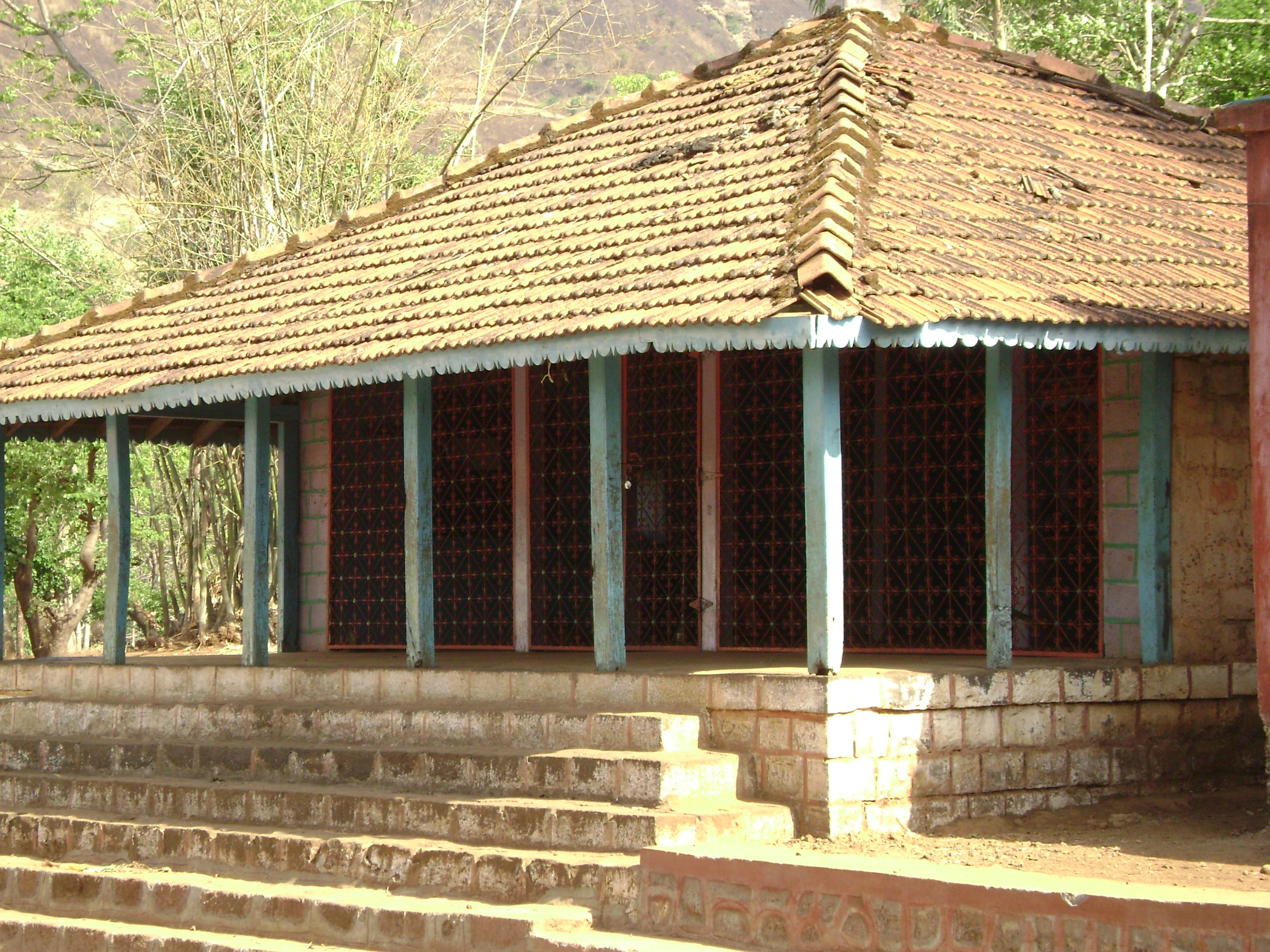
Ram Mandir in Dahyat

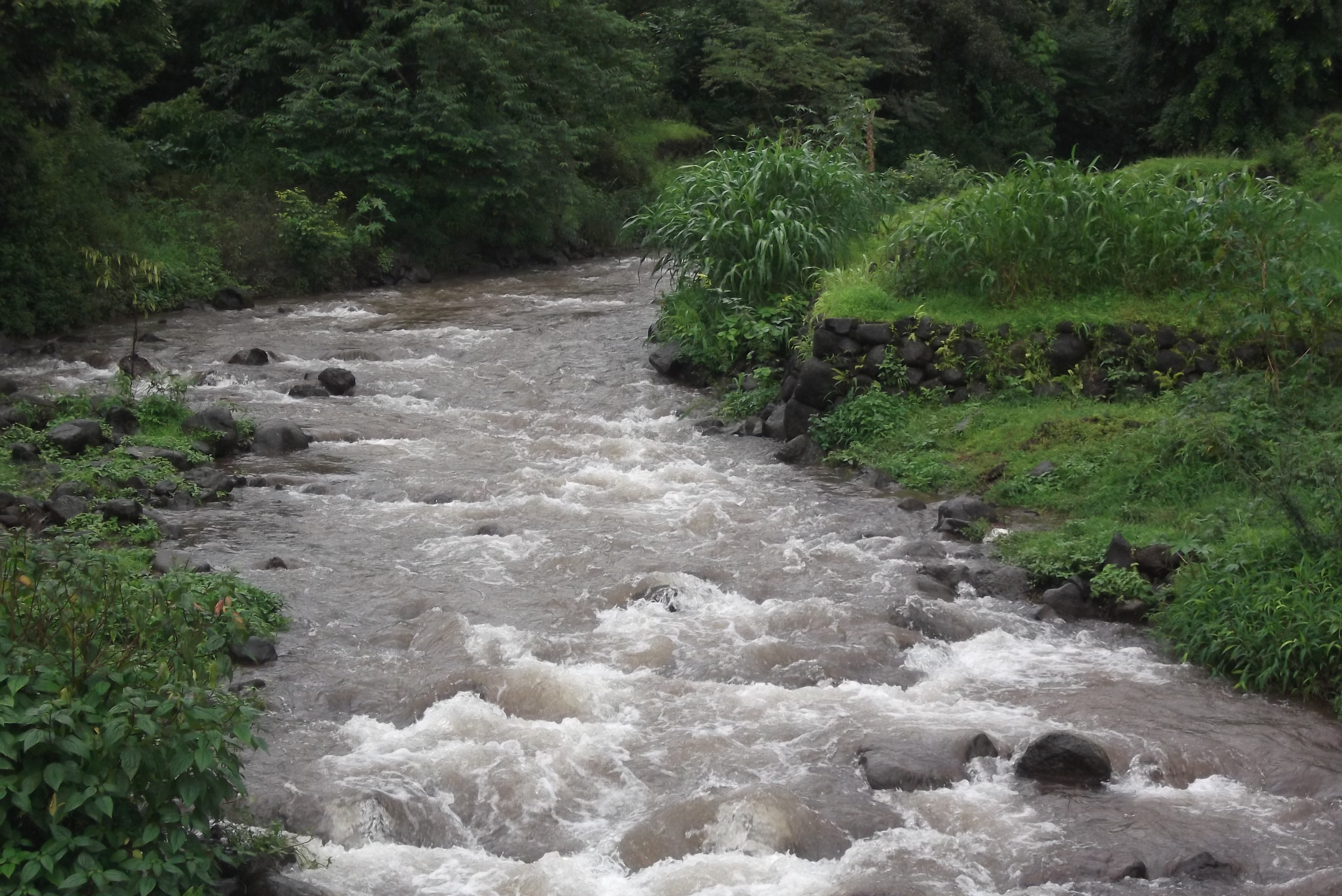
Krishna River in Dahyat

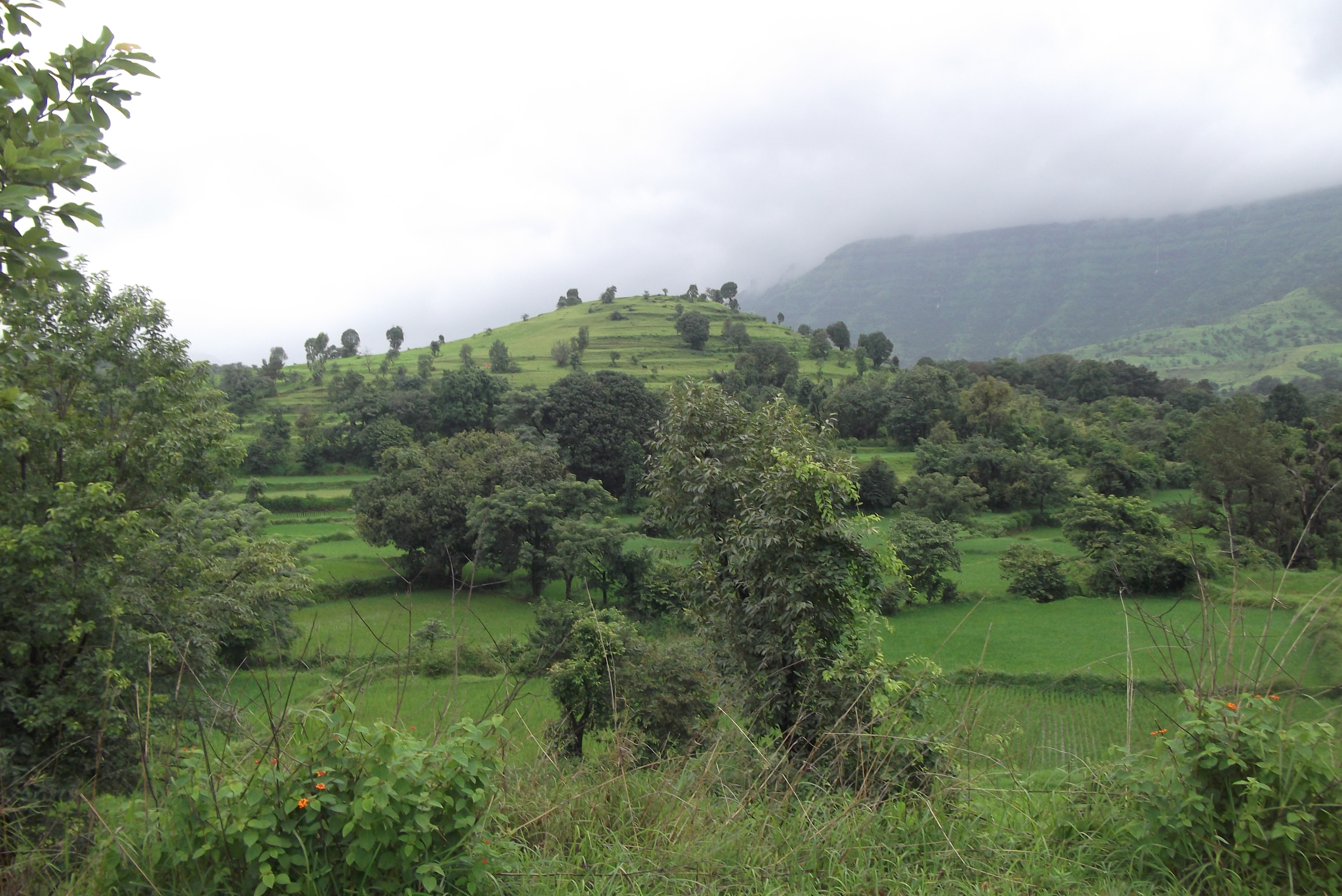
Gothmi hill in Dahyat in rainy season
