= Dhom Dam =

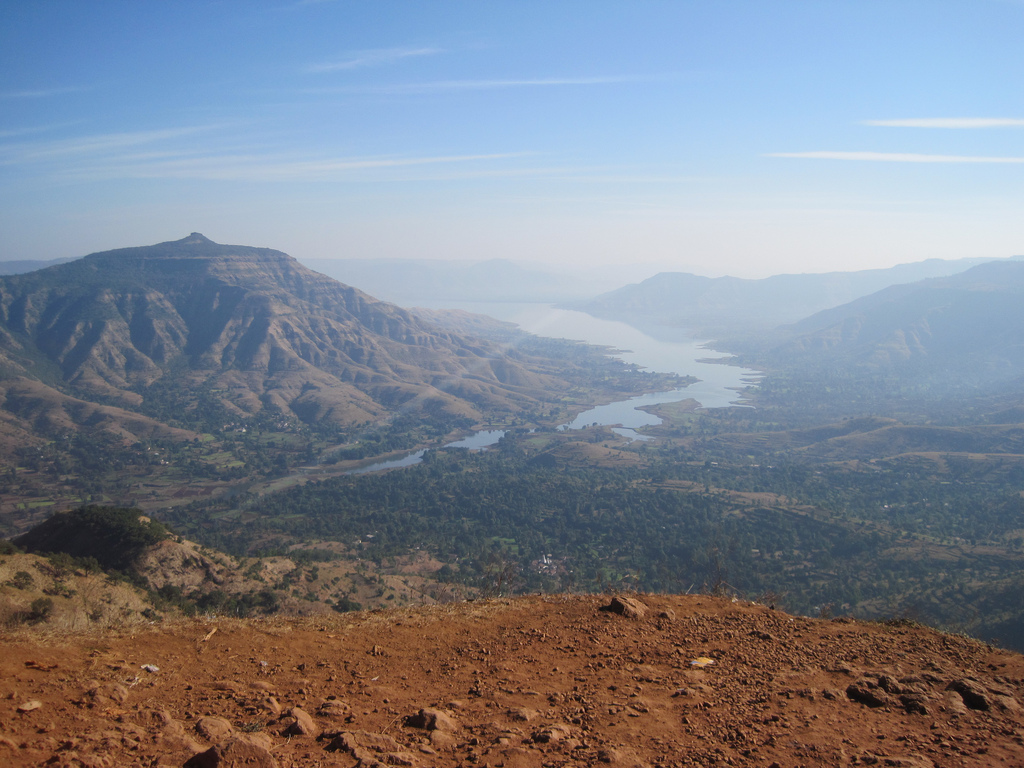
- Dhom Lake, below Balakwadi Dam, viewed from Kate's Point near Mahabaleshwar

- Location within Maharashtra
- Official name: Dhom Dam D02958
- Location: Pachangi, Maharashtra, India
- Coordinates: 17.9814986°N 73.7954449°E
- Opening date: 1977
- Owners: Government of Maharashtra, India

Dam and spillways
- Type of dam: Earthfill; Gravity
- Impounds: Krishna River
- Height: 50 m (160 ft)
- Length: 2,478 m (8,130 ft)
- Dam volume: 6,335 km^{3} (1,520 cu mi)

Reservoir
- Total capacity: 3.82 km^{3} (0.92 cu mi)
- Surface area: 2,498 km^{2} (964 sq mi)

Dhom Dam is an earthfill and gravity dam on Krishna River near Wai in state of Maharashtra in India.

== Specifications ==
The height of Dhom Dam above the lowest foundation is 50 meters (160 ft, see box) while the length is 2,478 m (8,130 ft). The volume of Dhom Dam is 6,335 km^{3} (1,520 cu mi). Gross storage capacity is 13.80 TMC ft or 382.32 MCM (million cubic meters) or 3.82320 km^{3} (0.91723 cu mi).

== Purpose ==
- Irrigation: The construction of the Dhom Dam started in 1976. It was created to supply water for agriculture, for industries, and to supply drinking water for Wai, Panchgani-Mahabaleshwar and the surrounding villages on the bank of the dam. The Dhom Dam also supplied water for agriculture for Wai, Koregaon, Satara, Javli and Khandala talukas. The catchment area dams the Krishna River and forms the Dhom Lake, which is approximately 20 km (11 mi) in length. Completed in 1982, it is one of the largest civil engineering projects commissioned after Indian independence. The Dhom electricity project is run by the Maharashtra State Electricity Board and has a storage capacity of 14 T.M.C.
- Hydroelectricity: The Dhom Dam generates the electricity of 4 MW from the basement electricity house.

== Dhom village accessibility ==
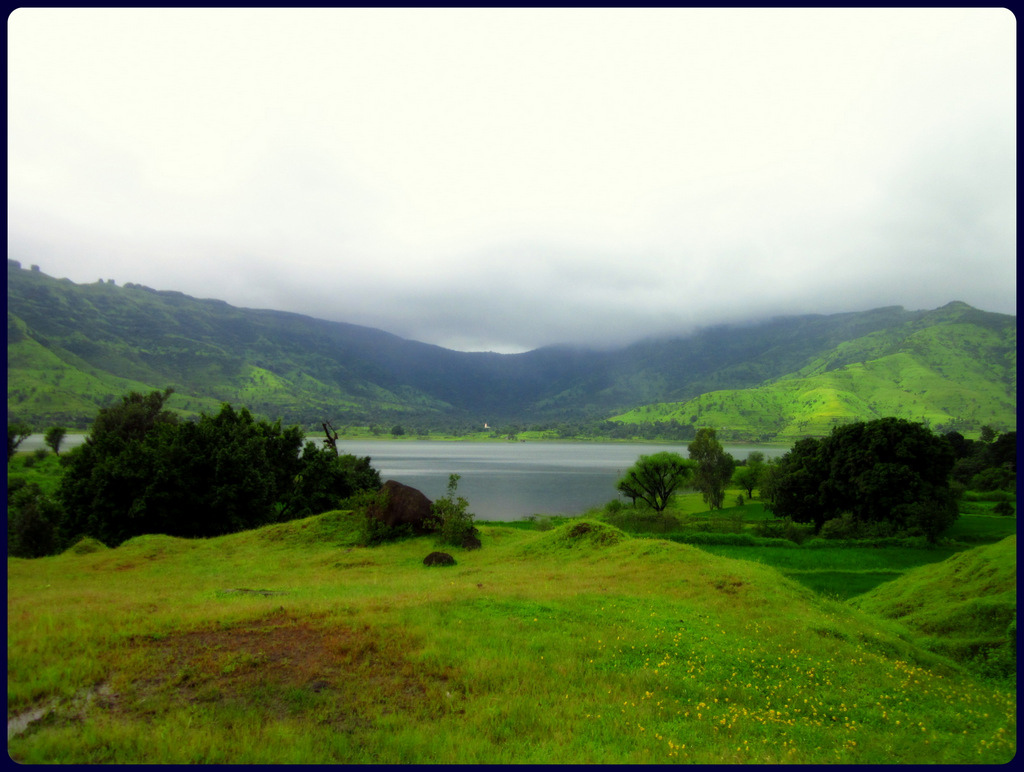
The reservoir for Dhom Dam on Krishna River in Wai, Maharashtra

- Dhom is a village in Wai Taluk, Satara district, Maharashtra state. Dhom is around 7.9 km from the taluk's main town, Wai, around 37.9 km from the district's main city, Satara, and around 228 km from the state capital, Mumbai.

Other villages in the Wai Taluk are Wai, Akoshi, Amrutwadi, Anandpur-Chorachiwadi, Anavadi and Anpatwadi.

Nearby villages are Varkhadwadi (1.5 km), Eksar (1.5 km), Boriv (0.5 km), Abhepuri (1.9 km), Pandewadi (2.5 km) and Velang (2.5 km). Nearby towns are Wai (7.9 km), Jawali (18.5 km), Mahabaleshwar (18.9 km) and Khandala (21.9 km).

Dhom's PIN code is 412803. Other villages in 412803 are Wai, Vasole, Akoshi, Bhogaon and Dhom.

Dhom has the epithetic name "Dakshin Kashi". In old times, it was known as Virat Nagari. Dhom is known in Maharashtra for its ghats on the banks of the Krishna River and its temples, including especially the "Shree Narsinha" temple on the "Kreeshna Ghat". Movies such as Gangaajal, Omkara, Dabangg, Swadesh, Ishqiya, Singham, Deool, Bol Bachchan, Zila Ghaziabad have been filmed in Dhom.

- Dhom is located at 17.94°N 73.88°E, approximately 95 km south of the city of Pune (Devanagari: पुणे). It has an average elevation of 718 metres (2355 feet). It is surrounded by the mountainous region of the Sahyādris; ("Dhom Dam" has been constructed in the vicinity of Dhom). The boundaries of the taluka (sub-district) called Wai are as follows- to the east of Wai are the talukas of Khandala and Koregaon, to the west lies the taluka of Mahabaleshwar, the northern border abuts the Pune district and the north-west border is shared with the district of Raigad. South of Wai are the taluka of Jawali Taluka and Satara. The headquarters of the taluka of Wai is the city by the same name, populated by about 25,000 people. Wai is 35 km from Satara, 95 km from Pune and 250 km from Mumbai. Wai is situated on the Mahad-Pandharpur State Highway. Wai is a major city on the way to the hill stations Mahabaleshwar and Panchgani.

According to the 2001 census in India, Wai had a population of 31,090. Males constituted 51% of the population, and females, 49%. Literacy in Wai was 77% (which is higher than the national average of 59.5%), male and female literacy being 81% and 73%, respectively. As of 2001, 11% of the population was under six years of age. Wai is an old town - the newer part of the town is 200 years old, and the older part, over 350 years.

Afzal Khan, the general who led the troops of the Bijapur Sultan, camped at Wai during his campaign against Shivaji. Locals of Wai helped Afzal Khan and provided their residence in a mansion called Banawdikar Wada. Afzal Khan used this wada as a 'kutchery' or office. Banawdikar Wada was the scene of strategy sessions concerning how to capture or kill Shivaji, until Afzal Khan met his death at the hands of Shivaji at Pratapgarh. The wada still exists in Raviwar Peth of Wai. The wada's main door is a solid wooden structure with beautiful carvings in the fashion of the olden times.

About 200 feet up the road from Banawdikar Wada stands a smaller mansion known as Deshpande Wada. It was built by a disciple of Samarth Ramdas. Wai is also the site of Nana Phadnavis' wada, which stands on the banks of the Krishna. Across Banawdikar wada stands the large wada of the Kathavate family. It is almost 400 years old.

== See also ==
- Dams in Maharashtra
- List of reservoirs and dams in India
