= Mandher Devi temple stampede =

2005 stampede in Wai, Maharashtra, India

The Mandher Devi temple stampede occurred on Tuesday, 25 January 2005 at Mandher Devi temple near Wai in Satara district in Indian state of Maharashtra. The stampede broke out as 300,000 people converged on the Mandher Devi temple to undertake the annual pilgrimage on the full moon day of Shakambhari Purnima, in January and for participation in a 24-hour-long festival that includes ritual animal sacrifices to the goddess. Festivities also include the devotees breaking coconuts at Mangirbaba temple near the entrance and dancing with the Goddess Kalubai's idol held high.

Witnesses said the rush started around midday after some pilgrims slipped on the temple's steep stone steps, which were wet with coconut water spilled from fruit presented as offerings to the goddess Kalubai. A fire then broke out in shops nearby and gas cylinders exploded. Scores were crushed to death on the steep and narrow hill path leading to the temple and many others were charred. It was alleged that some drunk people had created the chaos which led to the disaster, as also mentioned by Justice (retd.) Rajan Kochar of Bombay High Court, in his report. 291 pilgrims died in the stampede.
