= Surur (village) =

Village in Maharashtra

Surur is a village located in Wai taluka at Satara District, Maharashtra, India.
