= Vairatgad Fort =

Fort in Maharashtra, India

Vairatgad
- Satara district, Maharashtra, India

Site information
- Owner: Government of India
- Open to the public: Yes

Location
- Vairatgad in Maharashtra
- Coordinates: 17.878073°N 73.917893°E
- Height: 1018m(3340 ft)

Vairatgad fort is a fort situated near to the town of Wai vyajwadi in Maharashtra, India.

The top of the fort is very small. There are remnants of old buildings. The bastion at the entrance is dilapidated. 5-6 cisterns can be seen to the left of the main gate, on the lower side of the cliff. There is a small cave to the right. At the top there is a Hanuman temple. An idol of Hanuman sits outside the temple.

This fort was under sardar pilaji gole as killedar for 1673 - 1689.

== History ==
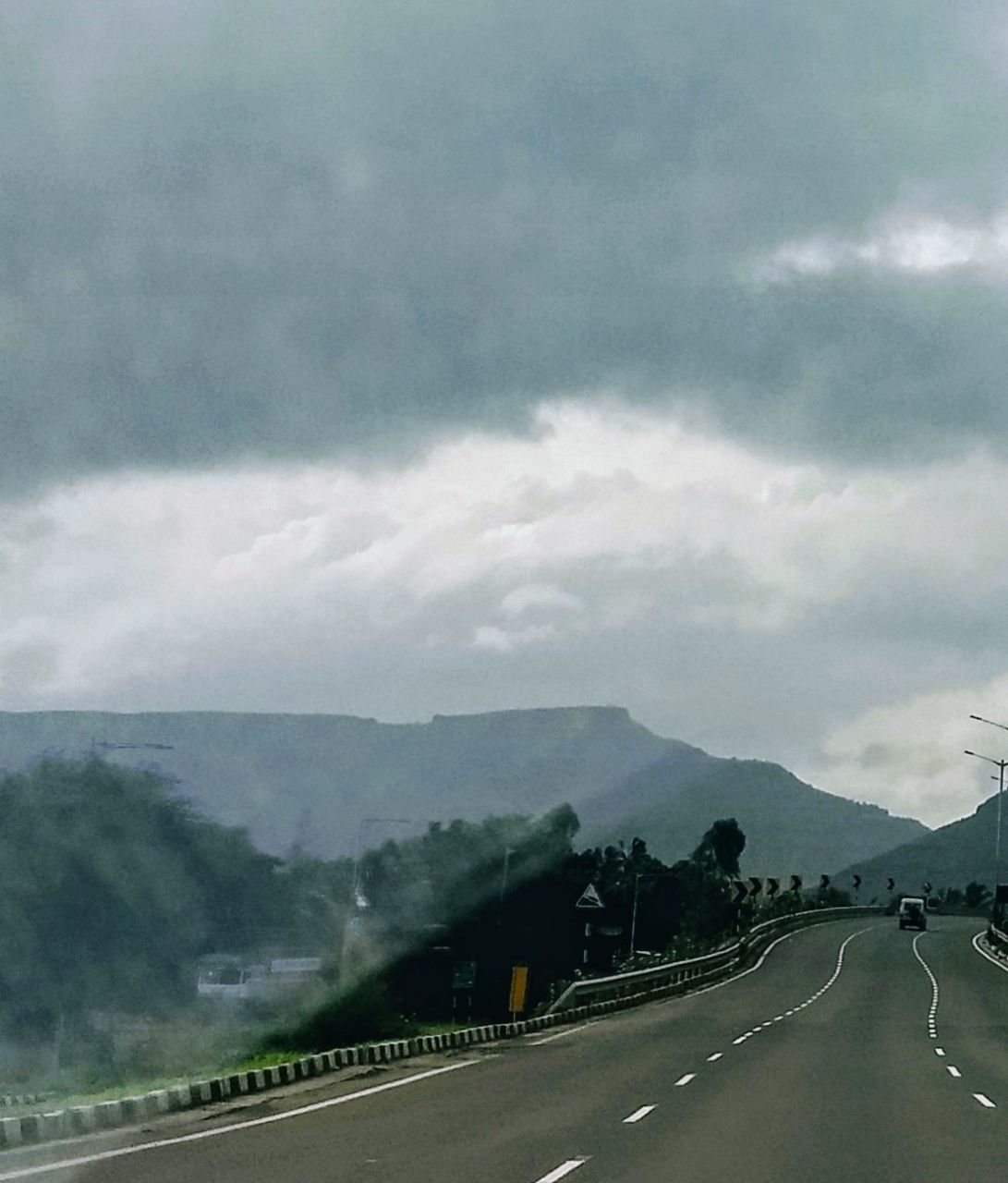
Vairatgad fort as seen from National Highway 48

King Bhoj of the Shilahar Dynasty built Vairatgad in the 11th century. During King Shivaji's reign the fort was used as a military station. King Shivaji conquered the Wai region and included Vairatgad and Pandavgad in his kingdom. The British captured it in 1818.
