= Lakshman Shastri Joshi =

Indian writer

Tarkateertha Lakshman Shastri Joshi
- Born: 27 January 1901; Pimpalner, Dhule, India
- Died: 27 May 1994 (aged 93); Somewhere near the origins of river Krishna, India
- Education: Sanskrit College and University
- Occupations: Independence activist, literary critic, writer
- Known for: • Compiling 20 volumes of Marathi Vishwakosh (Marathi Encyclopaedia) • First to be awarded Sahitya Akademi Award
- Works: वैदिक संस्कृतीचा विकास (The Development of Vedic Culture)
- Spouse: Satyawati Mulherkar
- Children: 4
- Honours: Sahitya Akademi Award (1955); Padma Bhushan (1973); Sahitya Akademi Fellowship (1989); Padma Vibhushan (1992)

Lakshman Shastri Joshi (Note: Due to the conversion from Devanagri to phonetic romanized spellings, he is also alternately referred to as "Laxman Shahstri Joshi". In Marathi articles he is most commonly referred to as "Tarkateertha Laxman Shahstri Joshi". Alternatively, Laxmanshastri Balaji Joshi) (27 January 1901 – 27 May 1994) was an Indian scholar, of Sanskrit, Hindu Dharma, and a Marathi literary critic, and supporter of Indian independence. Joshi was the first recipient of Sahitya Akademi Award in year 1955. He was also awarded with two of the India's highest civilian honours Padma Bhushan in 1973 and Padma Vibhushan in 1992.

== Early life and family ==
Lakshman Shastri was born in a Marathi Deshastha Brahmin family in 1901 to Balaji and Chandrabhaga Joshi, in the village of Pimpalner, tahsil sakri, Dhule district in the present-day state of Maharashtra. He left home at age 14 after studying to be a priest. He finally settled in Wai, a historic temple town on the banks of the Krishna River. In Wai, he studied Sanskrit, Hindu dharma and Indian philosophy at the Pradnya pathshala, a renowned Vedic school. Later in 1923 he earned the degree "Tarkateertha", or literally, "Master of logic" at the Government Sanskrit Mahavidyalaya of Calcutta. In 1927, he married Satyawati Mulherkar. They had two sons and two daughters. Their elder son, Madhukar had a distinguished career at IBM in research and management.

== Career ==
Joshi spent all his life in Wai. He was closely associated with Pradnya pathshala all his life. Although a Brahmin, he spent his life going against tradition. In 1932, at the age of 29, he was jailed by the British for his role in the freedom movement. (Note: The call for determined, but passive resistance that signified the certitude that Gandhi foresaw for the movement is best described by his call to Do or Die, issued on 8 August at the Gowalia Tank Maidan in Bombay, since re-named August Kranti Maidan (August Revolution Ground)) However while in prison, he quickly gained a reputation as a Hindu dharma scholar. Under the tutelage of Vinobha Bhave, he learned English when Bhave came to Wai to study under Kewalananda Saraswati. It was during one of those internments that Mahatma Gandhi, troubled by respectable Brahmin priests shying away from officiating at the intercaste marriage of his son Devdas, a Vania, or merchant class boy, to Lakshmi, the daughter of C. Rajagopalachari, a Brahmin, and later the second Governor General of independent India approached the young Joshi for his opinion on whether such a marriage was against Hindu dharma. With his thorough knowledge of the Shastras, Joshi not only judged the marriage acceptable but also performed the wedding ceremony.

In the 1930s, Joshi came under the influence of radical humanist M. N. Roy and quickly assimilated and embraced western philosophical systems. He questioned whether those that had the knowledge had the wisdom to lead, and recognized those that followed had inadequate knowledge. He was the member of Roy's Radical Democratic party until its dissolution 1948. He wrote a Marathi treatise called Vaidik Sankriti-cha Vikas (Development of Vedic Civilization) in 1951. This treatise was based on six lectures he delivered at the University of Pune, where he traced the evolution of "Vedic" culture and its influence on modern India. He wrote a critique arguing that modern Indians became conflicted between meeting material needs and attaining spiritual enlightenment, thus fostering a collective weakness, disharmony and allowing caste differences to prevail.

In 1954, he presided over Marathi Sahitya Sammelan, which was held in New Delhi. In 1955, he received a Sahitya Akademi Award for his work Waidik Sanskruticha Wikas (वैदिक संस्कृतीचा विकास).

He served as the first president of Maharashtra State Board of Literature and Culture when it was established in 1960, and starting from that year, served for a large number of years as the president of the project of compiling Vishwakosh, a 20-volume Marathi encyclopedia under the sponsorship of the above Board. He also spearheaded compilation of Dharmakosha, a Marathi transliteration of the ancient Vedic/Hindu Sanskritic hymns. In Wai, he also opened a hostel for students of the Dalit castes, a factory for making hand-made paper and a printing press.

== Literature ==
His first book, Shuddhisarvasvam, is a treatise in Sanskrit on the philosophical basis of religious conversion, published in 1934. In that same year, he edited the Dharmakosha, which encompassed twenty-six volumes and 18,000 pages, encoding the basic texts and commentaries on the varied aspects of dharma and dharma-shastras from 1500 BC to the 18th century. In 1938, he wrote Anand-Mimamsa, a critical commentary on the theory or Ras and aesthetics in Marathi literature. Later in 1973, he wrote Adhunik Marathi Sahityachi Samiksha, a study of the tenets of modern Marathi literary criticism. He also wrote Hindu Dharmachi Samiksha, in 1940, critically examining the concepts and foundation of Hinduism, and Jadawad, in 1941, a survey of the history and development of materialism in Indian and Western philosophical traditions. He wrote Vaidik Sanskriticha Vikas in 1958 to much acclaim. Amongst other works are Upanishadanche Marathi Bhashantar, a translation of the 18 principal Upanishads into Marathi.

Other works include:

- Waidik Sanskruticha Wikas
- Wichara-Shilpa
- Samiksha Ani Rasa-Siddhant
- Critique of Hinduism and other Religions
- Descriptive Catalogue of Sanskrit Manuscripts

== Recognition and death ==
For his outstanding contribution, he received the Sahitya Akademi award from India's National Academy of Letters in 1955.

In 1973, he received the National Sanskrit Pandit Award, and in 1976, the government of India conferred on him the Padma Bhushan title, India's third highest honour, for excellence in Literature and Education.

He was awarded an honorary doctorate in literature from Bombay University in 1975.

In 1989, Joshi received a Sahitya Akademi Fellowship, the highest award for lifetime achievement given by the Akademi, which is India's National Academy of Letters.

In 1992 he was awarded the Padma Vibhushan, India's second-highest civilian honor, in recognition of a lifetime of exceptional and distinguished service to India.

He died at the age of 94, near the birth spring of the Krishna river.
