= Mandhradevi =

Temple in Satara, Maharashtra

Mandhardevi

Religion
- Affiliation: Hinduism
- District: Satara District
- Deity: Lord Mandeshwar

Location
- Location: Wai
- State: Maharashtra
- Country: India
- Interactive map of Mandhardevi

Architecture
- Completed: More than 400 years old

The Mandhardevi Kalubai temple is near Wai (Satara District, Maharashtra, India). Located on a hill 4,650 feet above sea level, the temple, some 20 km from Wai, Satara, overlooks the picturesque Pandavgad Fort and Purandar fort. Devotees attribute miraculous properties to a grove around the shrine. Local lore has it that the temple is more than 400 years old but no definite date on the construction is available.

The title of the land is in the name of Lord Mandeshwar and Kaleshwari Devi. Most of the year there is little tourist traffic.

The nearest primary health centre is six kilometres away and a major hospital is at Satara town.

The idol of Kalubai sports two silver masks and silk finery. The masks are carried in a procession by members of the Gurav family, seen as the hereditary custodians of the shrine. Members of this family take turns to conduct rituals.

== Kalubai Jatra pilgrimage ==
The temple is popular among Hindus who undertake the annual Kalubai Jatra pilgrimage over a ten-day period every January. The main event is a 24-hour-long festival on the day of the full moon that includes animal sacrifices to the demons of goddess whom she killed. The goddess is offered nivad of puran poli (a sweet) and curd rice. The religious event usually draws more than 300,000 devotees. The annual fair is in honour of Kaleshwari Devi, fondly called Kalubai by the faithful.

Over 300 devotees died during the pilgrimage in a stampede in 2005.

== See also ==
- Mandher Devi temple stampede
