= Kamalgad =

Fort in Wai Taluka, Maharashtra, India

Kamalgad Fort
- Part of Sahyadri Hill Range
- Satara district, Maharashtra
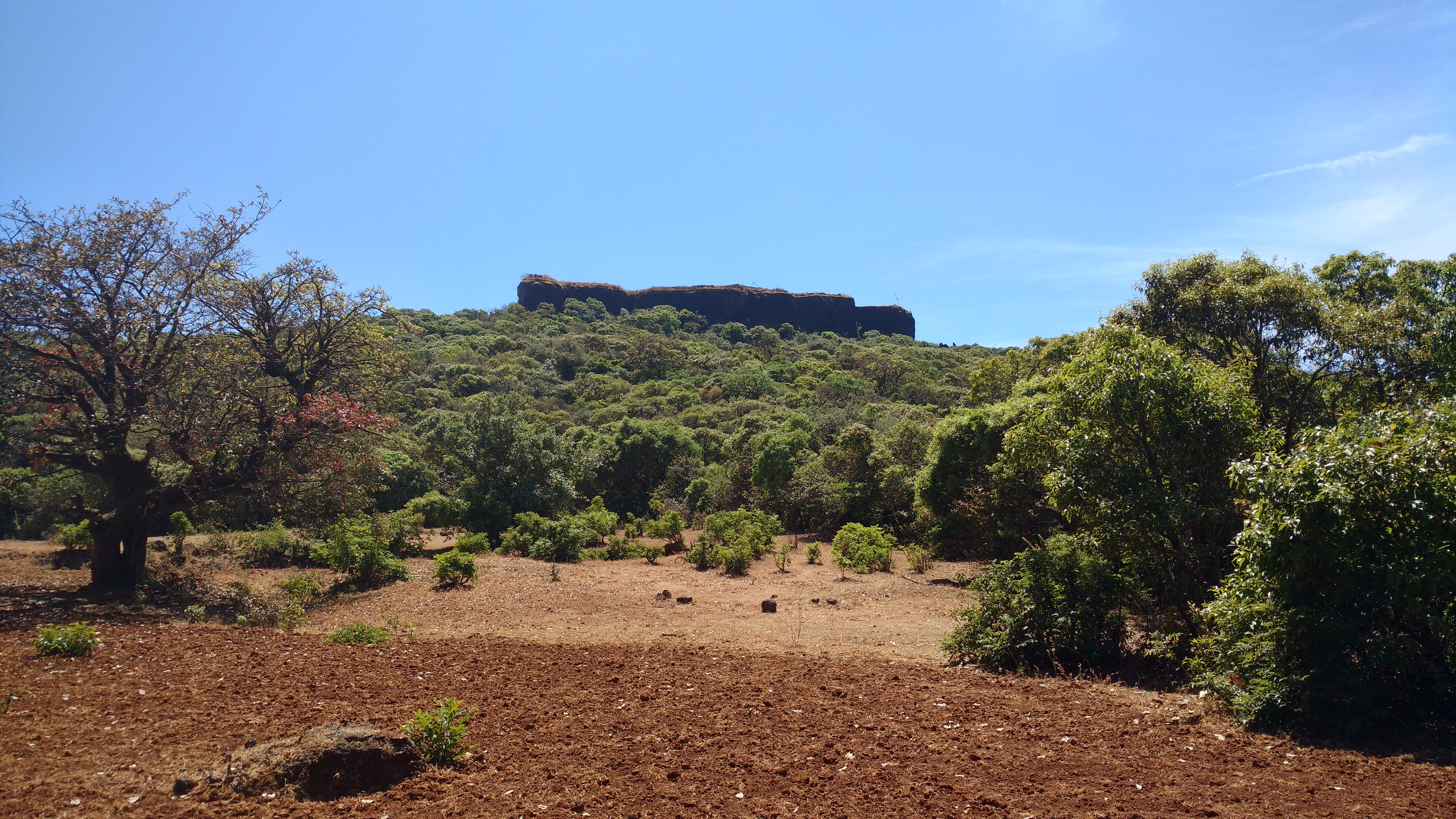
- Kamalgad fort

Site information
- Type: Hill fort
- Owner: Government of Maharashtra
- Open to the public: Yes
- Condition: Ruins

Location
- Shown within Maharashtra
- Coordinates: 17°58′02.2″N 73°44′42.7″E
- Height: 4200 Ft.

Site history
- Materials: Stone

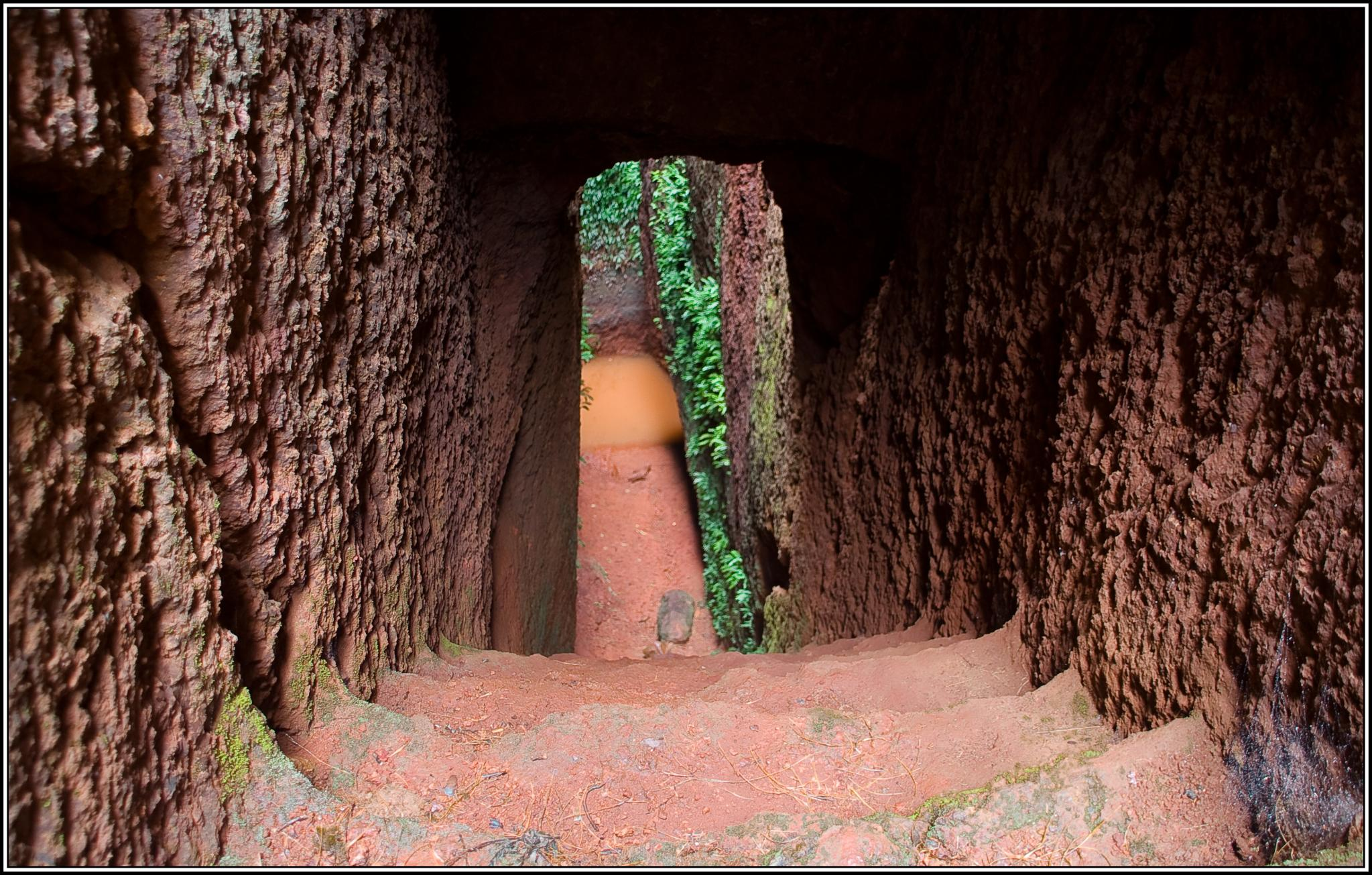
Stairs, Kamalgad fort

Kamalgad (literally lotus fort), also called Bhelanja or Kattalgad (literally death fort) is a square hill fort in Wai Taluka in Maharashtra, India.

== Location ==
It is ten miles (16 km) west of Wai and 32 km from Satara. Its coordinates are 18° 05' N, 74° 00' E. It has an elevation of 4,511 feet (1,375 m) above sea level.

== History ==
The builder of the fort is unknown. During Maratha times, Kamalgad, Pandavgad and other forts in the area were administered by a mokasaddar (manager) from Bijapur. Early documents written in now defunct Modi script of the Marathi language refer to the fort as 'Kattalgad'. A detailed study of these documents is underway. In April 1818, Kamalgad surrendered after resistance to a British detachment commanded by a Major Thatcher. Under the British, it was used to execute prisoners of war.

== Major features ==
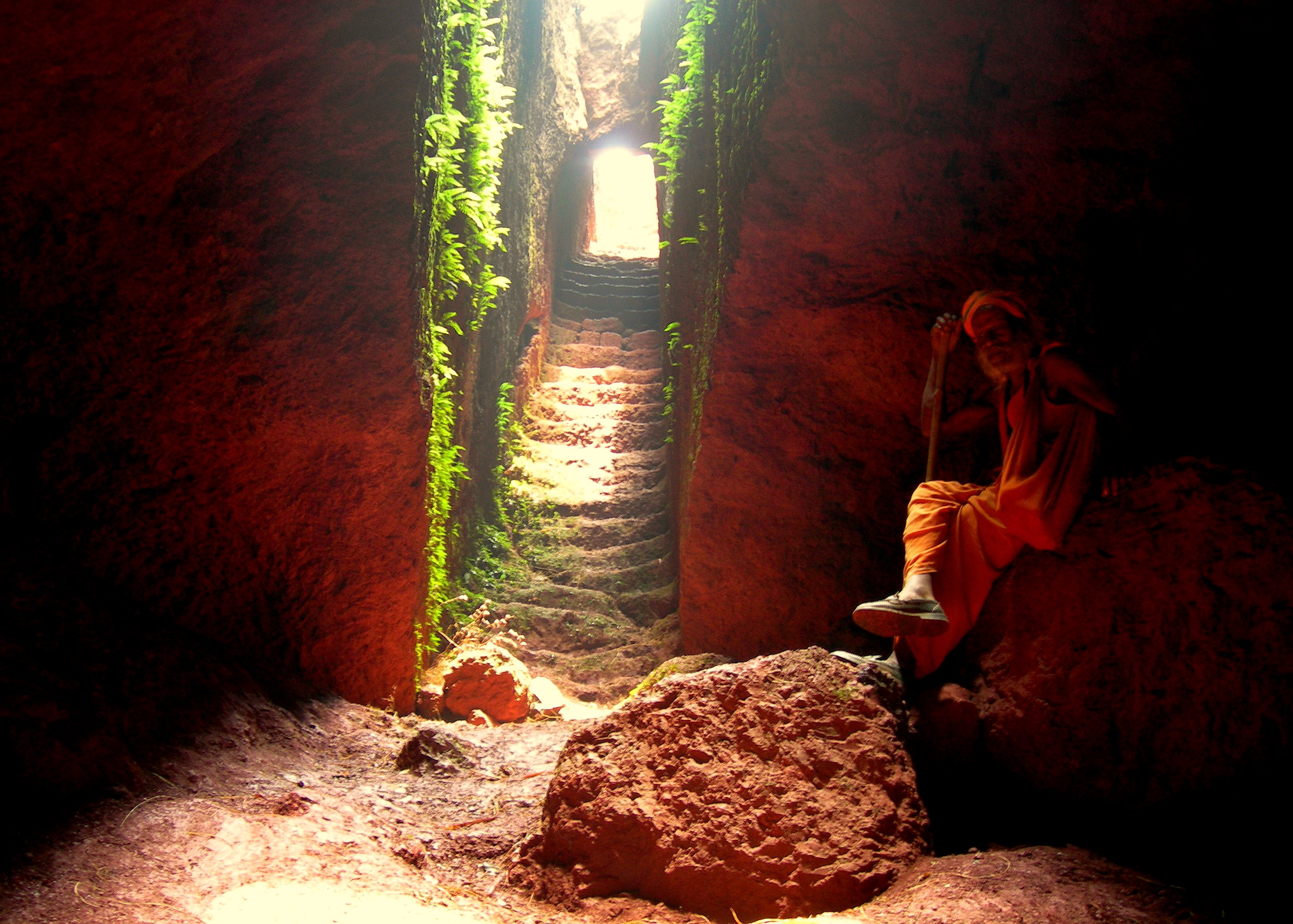
Red ocher in Kamalgad fort

The Map of Kamalgad Fort

The fort covers a flat area, 3-4 acres in size. It is surrounded by steep rock and can only be reached by perilously scaling this rock. Earlier, the approach was by an artificial tunnel, which started at the base of the rock and emerged on the top. Now this tunnel is blocked by a big rock which fell into it and was never removed. There are no buildings on the top nor walls of any kind or even a gateway, which is unusual for a fort in this area. Likely, its height and steep rock around it provided it with enough protection.

== Places to see ==
The only structure on the top is a hole which is the remains of a well sunk right through the rock, into the soil below which still has water. The hole is eighteen to twenty feet deep. The sides of the well which were formed of the natural rock were reported to have contained recesses in which criminals were placed. They had to choose between starvation and drowning. However, none of the recesses can be discerned today. Some reports indicate that this 'hole' might have been a quarry for red stone (geru) which is plentiful in this region (see picture).

== How to reach ==
The nearest town is Bhor or Wai which is easily reachable from Pune. The base village of the fort is Tupewadi which is 30 km from Wai and 46 km from Bhor.There are good hotels at Bhor and Wai for stay and food. The trekking path starts from the hillock south of the Tupewadi. The route is very safe. It takes about 2 hours to reach the machi.The route is well covered with trees. The hill route ends upon an open land called Kamal machi.On the machi there is dense forest of Jambhul and Pisa trees. After reaching the machi the path takes a left turn to reach the lone villager's hut. The lone villager on the machi can make arrangements for night stay and food at very reasonable cost. The balekilla can be reached from Machi within 20mins.Balekilla is a scarp rising 30-40feet above the forest covered area.

== Gallery ==
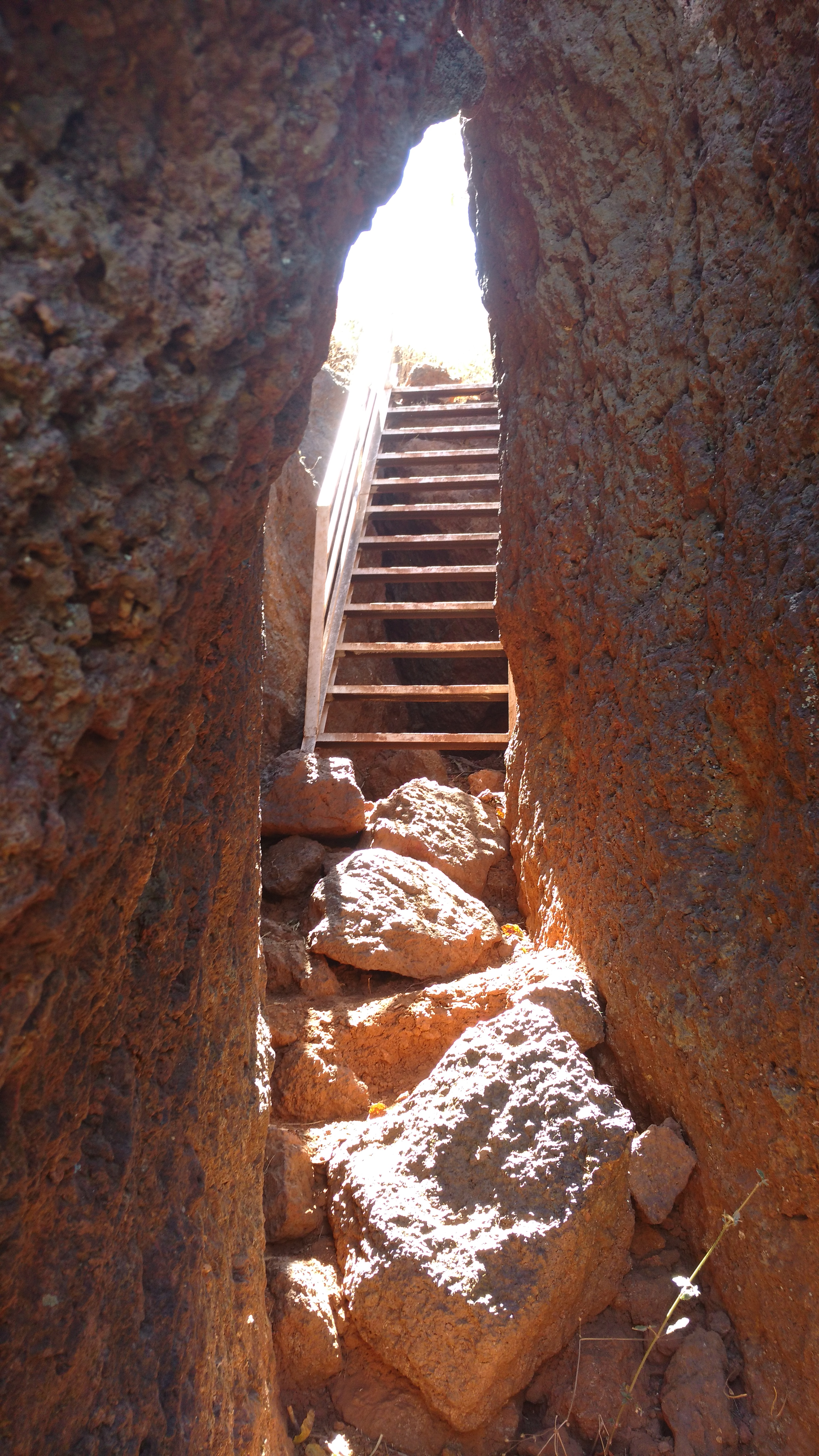
Entrance to balekilla

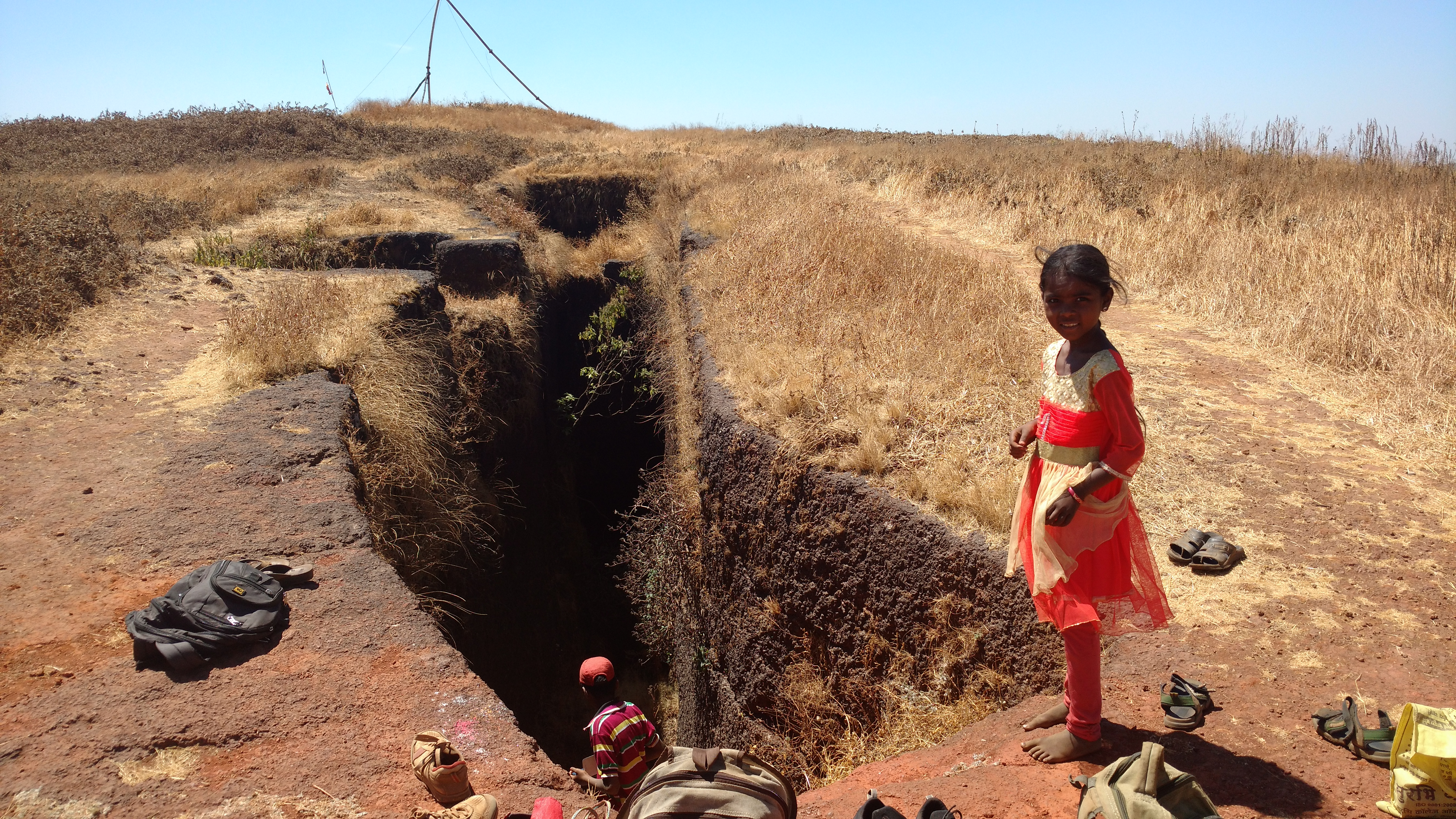
Red Ochre cave entrance

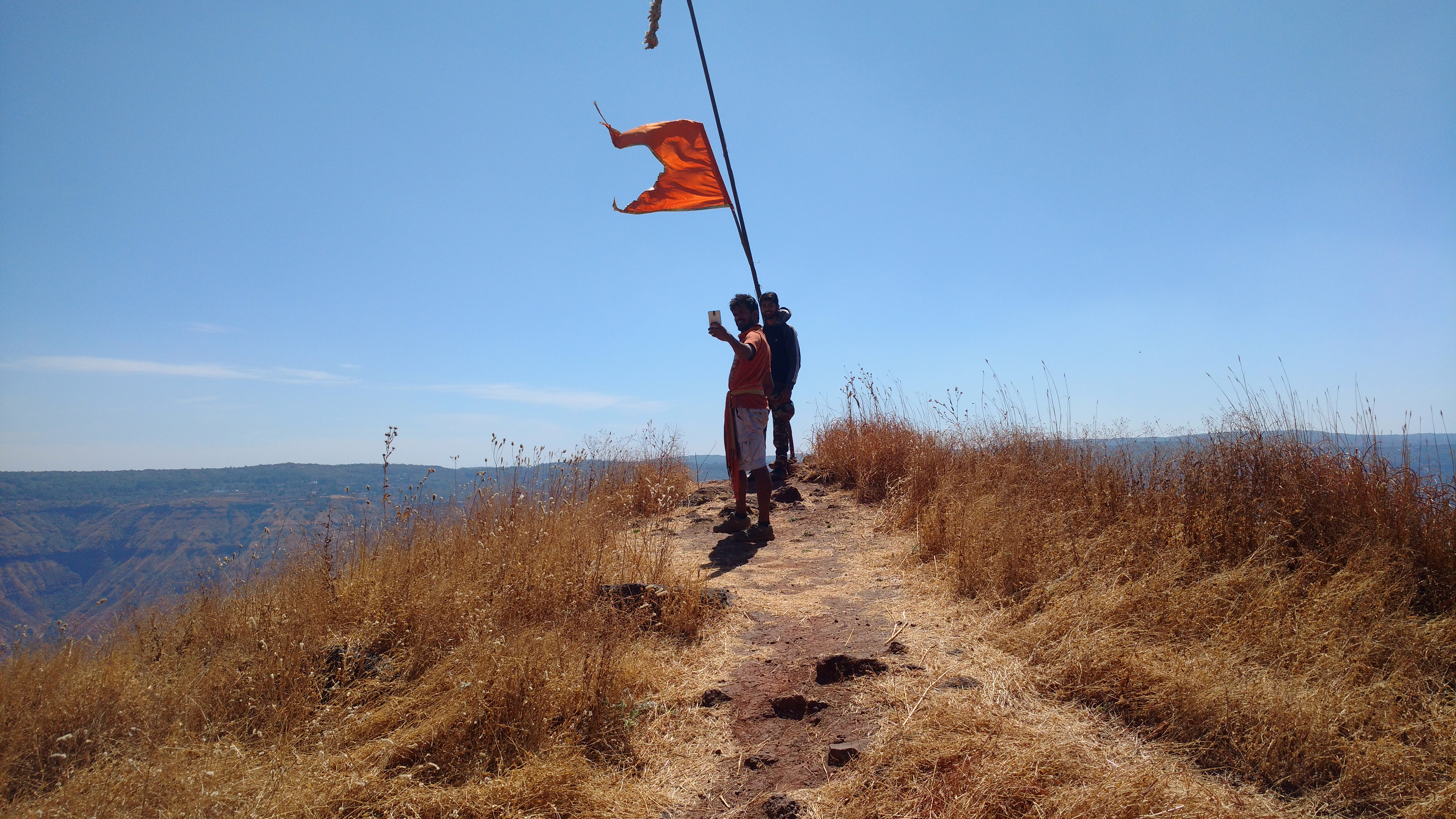
Highest point

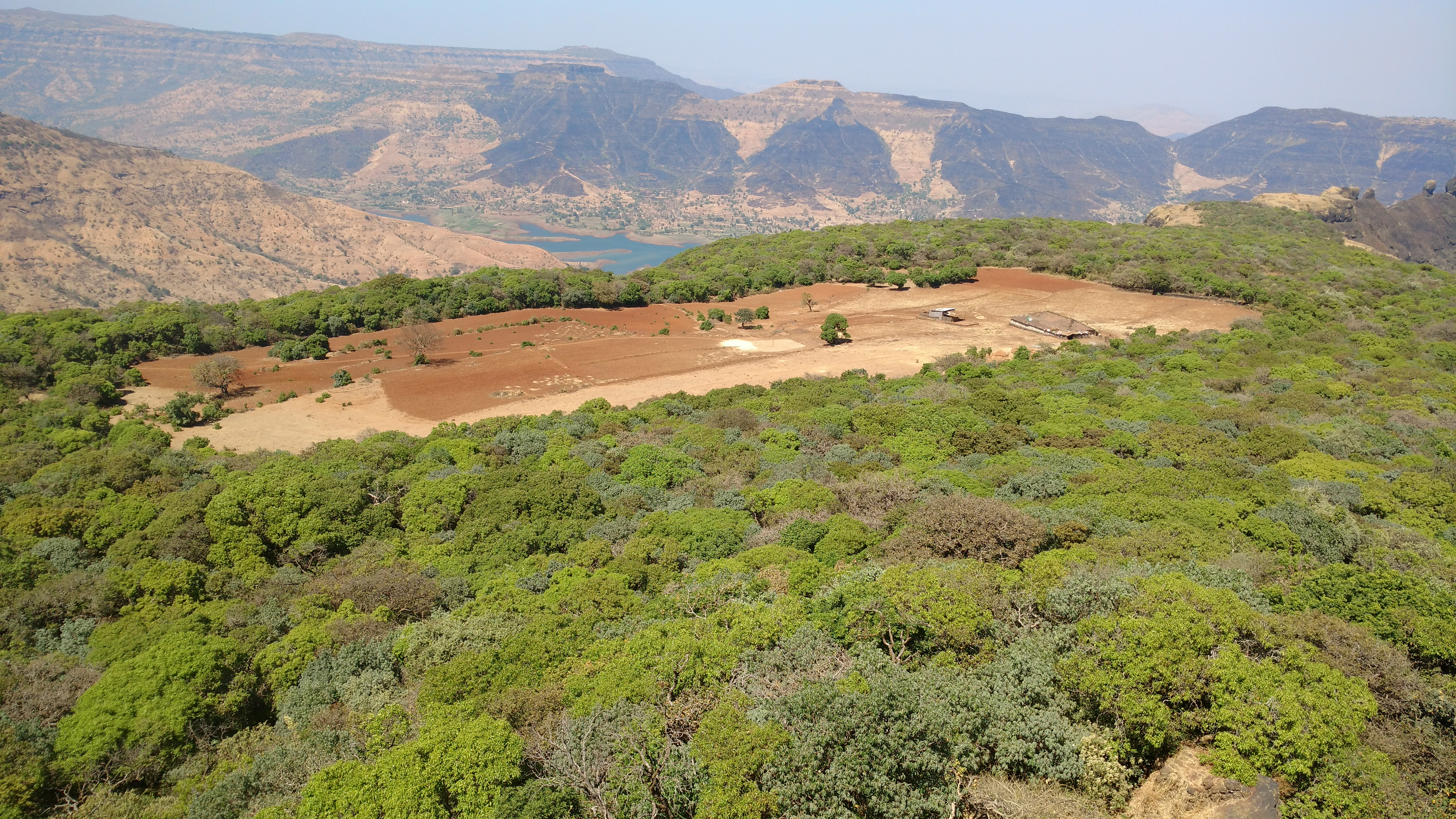
View of machi from Balekilla

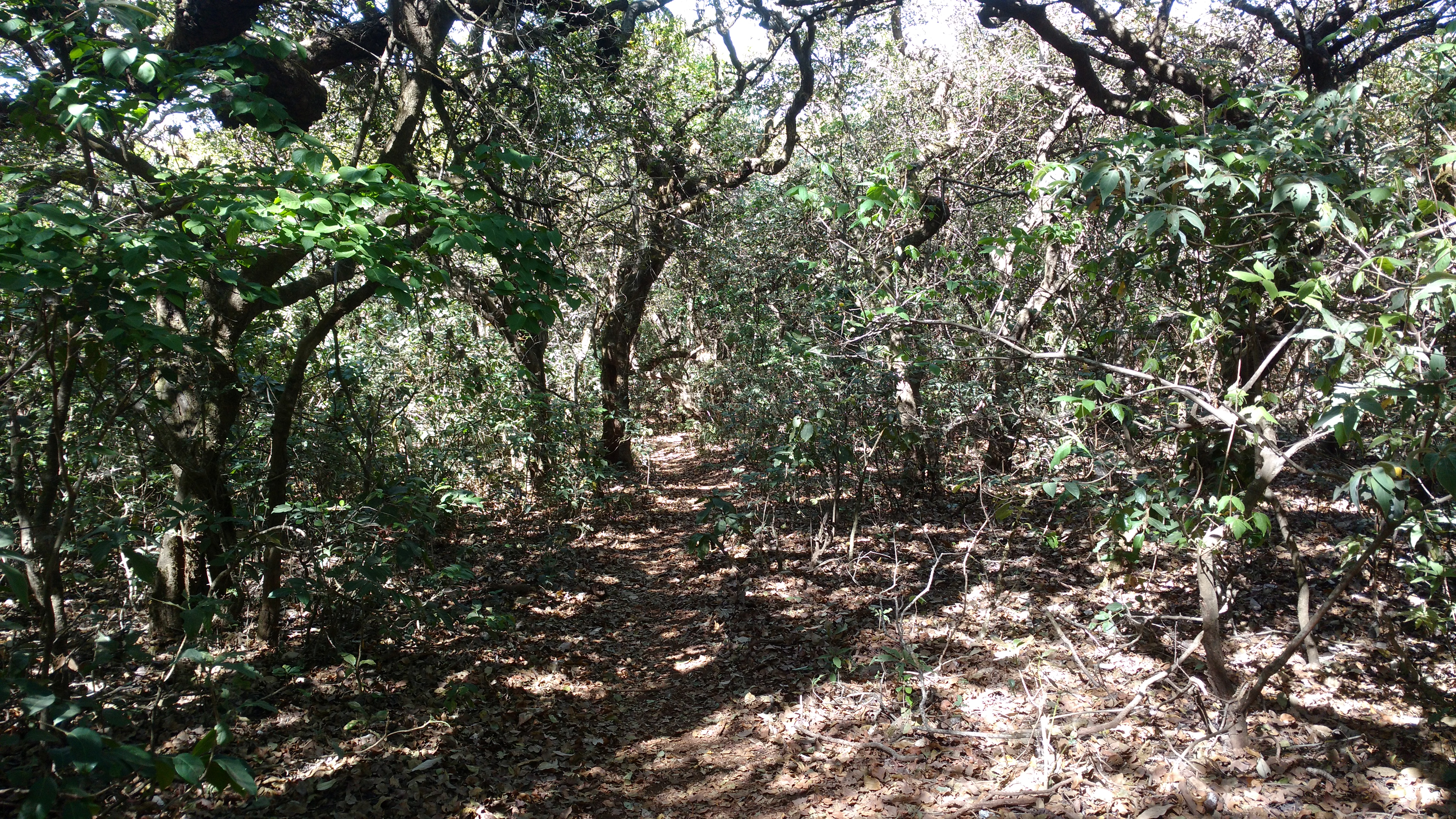
Trekking path

== View of mahabaleshwar Plateau ==
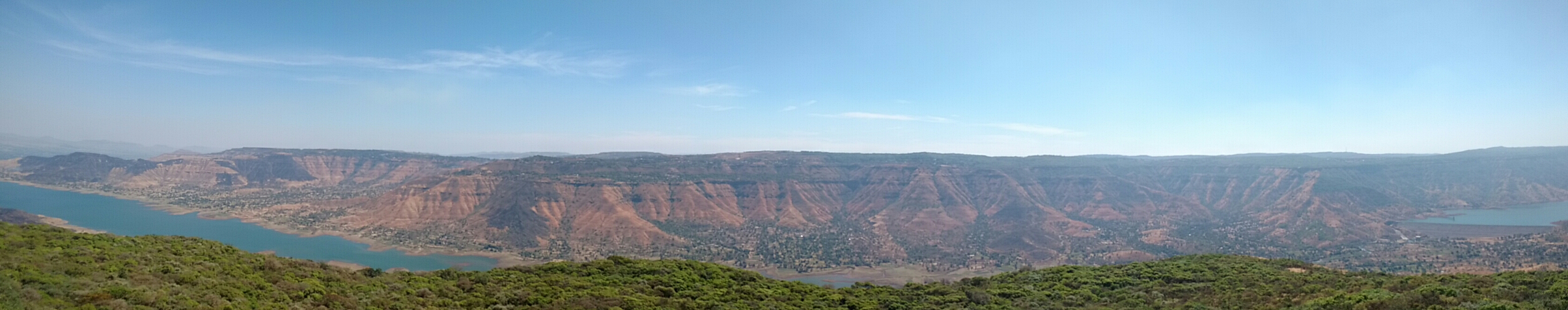
View of Mahabaleshwar and Pachgani Plateau from Kamalgad

== See also ==
- List of forts in Maharashtra
- List of forts in India
- Baji Prabhu Deshpande
- Marathi People
- Maratha Navy
- List of Maratha dynasties and states
- Maratha War of Independence
- Battles involving the Maratha Empire
- Maratha Army
