= Marathi Vishwakosh =

Free online encyclopedia in Marathi language

The Marathi Vishwakosh (lit. 'Marathi Encyclopedia') is an online free encyclopedia in Marathi language, funded by the Government of Maharashtra, India.

The project to create the encyclopedia started as a print project and was inaugurated in 1960, and Lakshman Shastri Joshi was named the first president of the project. The first volumes were published in 1976, and eventually 22 volumes were published by 2010. The encyclopedia began publishing the existing volumes on the internet on October 25, 2011, as announced by the Chief Minister of Maharashtra in Mumbai. Currently nineteen volumes of the encyclopedia are available online on the Internet.

== Editors-in-Chief of Marathi Vishwakosh ==
The editors-in-chief of the Vishwakosh are as follows

Sr No.	Editor	Tenure
1.	Tarkateertha Lakshman Shastri Joshi	November 19, 1960 to May 27, 1994
2.	Prof. M. P. Rege	June 4, 1994 to December 28, 2000
3.	Shri. R. G. Jadhav	January 16, 2001 to February 10, 2003
4.	Dr. Shrikant Jichkar	July 21, 2003 to June 2, 2004
5.	Dr. Vijaya Wad	December 9, 2005 to December 8, 2008, and June 9, 2009, to June 30, 2015
6.	Dilip Karambelkar	August 10, 2015 to January 2, 2020

== See also ==
- Marathi Language
