= National Horticulture Mission =

The National Horticulture Mission (NHM) is an Indian horticulture scheme promoted by the Government of India. It was launched under the 10th five-year plan in the year 2005-06. The Government of India contributes 85%, while 15% is contributed by state governments.

== Objectives ==
The NHM's key objective is to develop horticulture to the maximum potential available in the state and to augment production of all horticultural products (fruits, vegetables, flowers, coco, cashew nut, plantation crops, spices, medicinal aromatic plants) in the state. Other objectives include:

1. To provide holistic growth of the horticulture sector through an area based regionally differentiated strategies
2. To enhance horticulture production, improve nutritional security and income support to farm households
3. To establish convergence and synergy among multiple ongoing and planned programmes for horticulture development
4. To promote, develop and disseminate technologies, through a seamless blend of traditional wisdom and modern scientific knowledge
5. To create opportunities for employment generation for skilled and unskilled persons, especially unemployed youth

== See also ==
- Kerala State Horticulture Mission
