= Tambe =

Tambe is a surname. Notable people with the surname include:

- Bhaskar Ramchandra Tambe (1873–1941), Indian Marathi poet
- Milind Tambe (born 1965), Indian professor
- Pravin Tambe (born 1971), Indian cricketer
- S. B. Tambe, Indian politician
- Y. S. Tambe (1904–?), Indian jurist
- Sudhir Tambe, Indian Politician
- Satyajeet Tambe, Indian Politician
