= Kerala State Horticulture Mission =

Body to promote horticulture, India

Kerala State Horticulture Mission കേരള സംസ്ഥാന ഹോ൪ട്ടിക്ക‍ള്‍ച്ച൪ മിഷന്‍
- Type: Government
- Industry: Horticulture
- Founded: 2005
- Headquarters: Thiruvananthapuram, India
- Key people: Saji John (Mission Director)
- Products: Horticulture Sector
- Number of employees: around 200
- Website: http://shm.kerala.gov.in

Kerala State Horticulture Mission is a registered society set up under the Travancore Cochin Literary Scientific & Charitable Societies Registration Act 1955 to implement the National Horticulture Mission program, a centrally sponsored scheme, introduced during the financial year 2005–2006.

This scheme envisages an end to end development of the horticulture sector covering production, post harvest management, processing and marketing.

== Mission ==
The mission of the Kerala State Horticultural Mission is to discover new knowledge and developing useful methods, applications, and understandings.

National Horticulture Mission has been launched as a Central Sector Scheme to promote holistic growth of the Horticulture sector through an area based regionally differentiated strategies.

The scheme is fully funded by the Kerala Government and different components proposed for implementation will be financially supported on the scales laid down.

As part of the project, mushroom villages were established in about 50 locations and the project also took up the development of medicinal plants and formed a collaboration with the spices board.
