= C. R. Irani =

Indian journalist

Cushrow Russi Irani was an Indian journalist and the editor-in-chief of The Statesman. Over an illustrious career, he held a number of posts including Chairman of the Press Trust of India. Irani was known for his criticism and staunch opposition against Indira Gandhi's policy of press censorship during the state of emergency proclaimed in 1975.

The Statesman, of which he was also the managing director, was among very few newspapers to defy censors during the Emergency. Mr. Irani was known as a fierce defender of press freedoms for criticizing government censorship rules in the 1970s during the Emergency. He published blank spaces in The Statesman where reports or photos had been barred.

== Biography ==
Cushrow Russi Irani, born in 1931, was the chairman of Press Trust of India (PTI) for two terms, and a member of PTI Board for two decades till his death. Irani was the first Indian to be chairman of the International Press Institute in 1980 and 1981. He was again re-elected in 1990.

Irani was also vice-president of the World Press Freedom Committee, the apex body of press freedom organisations all over the world and a member of UNESCO's advisory group on press freedom. He was on the board of the International Press Institute (IPI).

A former insurance lawyer, Irani joined The Statesman as its managing director in 1968. He took over as the Editor-in-Chief in 1991 where he rested on his laurels as a fearless editor always ready to speak truth to power. In 2003, he relinquished the post of managing director but continued to head its board of directors as chairman.

He was author of well written books: 'Pax America-The War That Lost Iraq Its Freedom', 'Ayodhya- Demolishing A Dream` and `Bengal-The Communist Challenge.'

Irani who died of kidney failure at the Rabindranath Tagore Institute of Cardiac Sciences, is survived by his wife Threety Irani, a leading beautician, and three daughters.

The Statesman Print Journalism School was established in 2008 by the C R Irani Foundation, a not-for-profit body, in memory of Cushrow Russi Irani.

== Awards ==
Irani received "Knight Commander of the Order of Isabella Catholica" from the then King of Spain for highest loyalty to democracy in 1983.

He also received the ‘Freedom Award’ of Freedom House, New York, in 1977.
