= Imrana rape case =

2005 Indian sexual assault

The Imrana rape case is a case of sexual assault of a 28-year-old Indian woman by her father-in-law on 6 June 2005 in Charthawal in the Indian state of Uttar Pradesh. Village elders demanded she leave her home and husband because she had been raped by her father-in-law and a fatwa was given which supported this view.

== Timeline ==
- 6 June 2005: Ali Mohammed raped his daughter-in-law Imrana.
- 13 June 2005: A local panchayat declared Imrana's marriage to Nur Ilahi void as she "had sex" with her father-in-law and asked her to treat her husband as her son, which means she would have to stop living with him.
- 13 June 2005: Ali Mohammed is arrested.
- 16 June 2005: Ali Mohammed is sent to judicial custody.
- 30 June 2005: The police filed cases against Ali Mohammed along with a medical report. Imrana's statement is recorded before a magistrate.
- 5 December 2005: The court turned down Ali Mohammed's bail plea.
- 30 December 2005: The charges are framed against Ali Mohammed.
- 19 October 2006: The court sentenced Ali Mohammed to 10 years in prison for raping Imrana. He received a three-year term for a separate charge of criminal intimidation.

== See also ==
- Shah Bano case
