= Jawali, Maharashtra =

Village in Maharashtra

Jawali Jaoli, Javali
- village
- Location in Maharashtra, India Jawali (India)
- Coordinates: 17.99°N 74.42°E
- Country: India
- State: Maharashtra
- District: Satara district
- Talukas: Phaltan Tehsil

Government
  - Body: Gram panchayat

Languages
  - Official: Marathi
- Time zone: UTC+5:30 (IST)
- PIN: 415523
- ISO 3166 code: IN-MH
- Vehicle registration: MH

Jawali is a village in Phaltan, a tehsil of the Satara district of the Indian state of Maharashtra.
