= List of SonyLIV original programming =

SonyLIV is an Indian subscription video on-demand over-the-top Internet streaming platform that has distributed a number of original streaming television shows, including original series, specials and films.

SonyLIV original productions also include licensing or co-producing content from international broadcasters for exclusive broadcast in India and other territories, which is also branded as SonyLIV original content.

== LIV originals ==
These include the TV shows, Mini-Series and films that are partly or fully distributed by SonyLIV, some of which are also produced and co-produced with other digital labs and labelled as an original content.

=== TV shows ===
Title	Genre	Premiere date	Seasons	Language	Status
Kacho Papad Pako Papad	Comedy	18 May 2017	1 season 12 episodes	Gujarati	Completed
The Big Bong Connection	Satire Comedy	27 November 2018	1 season 10 episodes	Hindi	Completed
Muddugare Yashoda	Drama	6 January 2019	1 season, 6 episodes	Telugu	Completed
Gullak	Dramedy	27 June 2019	4 seasons, 20 episodes	Hindi	Renewed
Bhajana Batch	Comedy	20 September 2019	1 season, 12 episodes	Telugu	Completed
Iru Dhuruvam	Crime thriller	29 September 2019	1 season, 9 episodes	Tamil	Pending
Your Honour	Thriller Drama	18 June 2020	2 seasons, 22 episodes	Hindi	Renewed
Undekhi	Crime thriller	10 July 2020	2 season, 20 episodes	Hindi	Renewed
Avrodh	Military drama	30 July 2020	2 seasons, 18 episodes	Hindi	Renewed
JL50	Sci-fi thriller	4 September 2020	1 season, 4 episodes	Hindi	Completed
Scam 1992	Financial thriller	9 October 2020	1 season, 10 episodes	Hindi	Completed
Uncommon Sense with Saloni	Comedy	5 November 2020	1 season, 20 episodes	Hindi	Completed
A Simple Murder	Crime comedy	20 November 2020	1 Season, 7 episodes	Hindi	Completed
Shrikant Bashir	Crime Action	11 December 2020	1 season, 25 episodes	Hindi	Completed
Sandwiched Forever	Sitcom	25 December 2020	1 season, 15 episodes	Hindi	Completed
Love JAction	Romance thriller	11 March 2021	1 season, 6 episodes	Hindi	Completed
Project 9191	Action thriller	26 March 2021	1 season, 7 episodes	Hindi	Completed
Game	Crime thriller	21 April 2021	1 season, 6 episodes	Telugu	Completed
Kathmandu Connection	Crime	23 April 2021	2 season, 12 episodes	Hindi	Completed
Maharani	Drama	28 May 2021	4 season, 36 episodes	Hindi	Pending
Chutzpah	Drama	23 July 2021	1 season, 7 episodes	Hindi	Completed
Shantit Kranti	Dramedy	12 August 2021	1 season, 6 episodes	Hindi	Completed
Chalo Koi Baat Nahi	comedy	20 August 2021	1 season, 6 episodes	Hindi	Pending
Potluck	Sitcom	10 September 2021	1 season, 8 episodes	Hindi	Completed
Tabbar	Thriller	15 October 2021	1 season, 8 episodes	Hindi/Punjabi	Completed
Tryst with Destiny	Anthology	5 November 2021	1 season, 4 episodes	Hindi/English	Completed
The Whistleblower	Crime	16 December 2021	1 season, 9 episodes	Hindi	Completed
Rocket Boys	Biographical	4 February 2022	2 season, 16 episodes	Hindi/English	Completed
Pet Puraan	Social Comedy	6 May 2022	1 Season 7 episodes	Marathi	Completed
Nirmal Pathak Ki Ghar Wapsi	Drama	27 May 2022	1 season, 5 episodes	Hindi	Completed
Salt City	Family Drama	16 June 2022	1 season, 7 episodes	Hindi/English	Pending
Dr. Arora	Comedy Drama	22 July 2022	1 season, 8 episodes	Hindi	Pending
Meme Boys	Drama	22 July 2022	1 season, 8 episodes	Tamil	Pending
Victim	Anthology	4 August 2022	1 season, 4 episodes	Tamil	Pending
Tamil Rockerz	Drama Thriller	19 August 2022	1 season, 8 episodes	Tamil	Pending
Good Bad Girl	Drama	14 October 2022	1 season, 9 episodes	Hindi	Pending
Kaiyum Kalavum	Drama	3 November 2022	1 season, 8 episodes	Tamil	Pending
Tanaav	Action	11 November 2022	1 Season, 12 episodes	Hindi	Pending
Meet Cute	Drama	25 November 2022	1 season, 5 episodes	Telugu	Completed
Faadu: A Love Story	Romantic Drama	9 December 2022	1 Season, 11 episodes	Hindi	Completed
3 C's	Drama Thriller	6 January 2023	1 season, 6 episodes	Telugu	Completed
Story of Things	Anthology	6 January 2023	1 season 5 episodes	Tamil	Completed
Jehanabad - Of Love & War	Thriller	3 February 2023	1 season, 10 episodes	Hindi	Completed
Nijam With Smita	Talk show	9 February 2023	1 season, 10 episodes	Telugu	Completed
Bad Trip	Comedy thriller	10 March 2023	1 season, 8 episodes	Telugu	Completed
Garmi	Crime drama	21 April 2023	1 season, 9 episodes	Hindi	Completed
Kafas	Drama	23 June 2023	1 season, 8 episodes	Hindi	Completed
Charlie Chopra & The Mystery Of Solang Valley	Mystery	30 June 2023	1 season, 6 episodes	Hindi	Completed
The Jengaburu Curse	Climate fiction Thriller	9 August 2023	1 season, 7 episodes	Hindi	Completed
Scam 2003	Financial crime	1 September 2023	1 season, 10 episodes	Hindi	Completed
Chamak	Musical thriller	6 December 2023	1 season, 6 episodes	Hindi	Completed
Raisinghani vs Raisinghani	Drama thriller	12 February 2024	Streaming Now	Hindi	Completed
Family Aaj Kal	Comedy Drama	3 April 2024	1 season, 5 episodes	Hindi	Completed
Adrishyam – The Invisible Heroes	Drama thriller	11 April 2024	Streaming Now	Hindi	Completed
36 Days	crime-thriller	12 July 2024	1 season, 8 episodes	Hindi	
Brinda	Crime thriller	2 August 2024	1 season, 8 episodes	Telugu	Pending
Bench Life	Drama	12 September 2024	1 season, 5 episodes	Telugu	Completed
Manvat Murders	Crime thriller	4 October 2024	1 season, 8 episodes	Marathi	
Zindaginama	Anthology	10 October 2024	1 season, 6 episodes	Hindi	
Raat Jawaan Hai	Comedy Drama	11 October 2024	1 season, 8 episodes	Hindi	
Jai Mahendran	Family Drama	11 October 2024	1 season 6 episodes	Malayalam	
Freedom at Midnight	Historical	15 November 2024	2 season 14 episodes	Hindi	Completed
Bada Naam Karenge	Romantic Drama	7 February 2025	1 season, 9 episodes	Hindi	
The Waking of a Nation	Historical drama	7 March 2025	1 season, 6 episodes	Hindi	
Black, White & Gray - Love Kills	Crime thriller	2 May 2025	1 season, 6 episodes	Hindi	
Kankhajura	Crime thriller	30 May 2025	1 season, 8 episodes	Hindi	
The Hunt: The Rajiv Gandhi Assassination Case	Historical drama	4 July 2025	1 season, 7 episodes	Hindi	
Mayasabha	Political drama	7 August 2025	1 season, 9 episodes	Telugu	
The Chronicles of the 4.5 Gang	Crime Comedy	29 August 2025	1 season, 6 episodes	Malayalam	
13th: Some Lessons Aren't Taught in Classrooms	comedy drama	1 October 2025	1 season, 5 episodes	Hindi	
Kuttram Purindhavan: The Guilty One	crime thriller	5 December 2025	1 season, 7 episodes	Tamil	
Real Kashmir Football Club	sports drama	9 December 2025	1 season, 8 episodes	Hindi	
Jazz City	Historical drama	19 March 2026	1 season, 10 episodes	Bengali	
Awaiting release

=== Films ===
Title	Genre	Runtime	Premiere date	Language
Kadakh	Black comedy	1 hour, 48 minutes	18 June 2020	Hindi
Bhonsle	Drama	2 hour, 8 minutes	26 June 2020	Hindi
Ram Singh Charlie	Neo-noir drama	1 hour, 44 minutes	28 August 2020	Hindi
Welcome Home	Horror	2 hour, 6 minutes	6 November 2020	Hindi
Dithee	Drama	1 hour, 29 minutes	21 May 2021	Marathi
Aavasavyuham	Comedy drama	1 hour, 54 minutes	4 August 2022	Malayalam
Parivarik ManuRanjan	Romantic comedy	1 hour, 54 minutes	13 November 2026	Hindi

== Exclusive programming ==
These include the exclusive digital streaming rights of the TV shows and films sold to SonyLIV by their respective production companies.

=== TV shows ===
Title	Genre	Original network	Original release	Exclusive premiere	Exclusive seasons	Language
Tripling	Drama	TVF	2016	5 April 2019	1 (Season2)	Hindi
Endukila	Romantic drama	YuppTV	19 April 2017	2019		Telugu
Mana Mugguri Love Story	Dramedy	YuppTV	18 October 2017	2019		Telugu
Hey Krishna	Comedy drama	YuppTV	25 January 2018	2019		Telugu
Girls Hostel	Dramedy	TVF and Girliyapa	2018	18 February 2021	1 (Season2)	Hindi
College Romance	Dramedy	TVF	2019	22 April 2019	4 (Season 2, 3 and 4)	Hindi
Gullak	Dramedy	TVF	2019	26 June 2019	3 (Season1, 2 and 3)	Hindi
Cubicles	Social Drama	TVF	2019	12 October 2019	2 (Season1 and 2)	Hindi

=== Documentaries ===
Title	Type	Original network	Original release	Exclusive premiere	Language
Hillary	Docu-series	Hulu	6 March 2020	15 October 2020	English

=== Films ===
Title	First release status	Genre	Exclusive premiere	Runtime	Language
Vaazhl	Direct-to-Digital	Drama	16 July 2021	1 hour, 52 minutes	Tamil
Thittam Irandu	Direct-to-Digital	Crime thriller	30 July 2021	120 minutes	Tamil
Vivaha Bhojanambu	Direct-to-Digital	Comedy	27 August 2021	2 hour, 1 minutes	Telugu
Kasada Tabara	Direct-to-Digital	Drama	27 August 2021	2 hour, 18 minutes	Tamil
Kaanekkaane	Direct-to-Digital	Drama thriller	17 September 2021	2 hours	Malayalam
Naduvan	Direct-to-Digital	Action thriller	24 September 2021	2 hour, 3 minutes	Tamil
Aakashavaani	Direct-to-Digital	Slice-of-life Drama	24 September 2021	2 hour, 4 minutes	Telugu
Priyuraalu	Direct-to-Digital	Romance	27 September 2021	2 hours	Telugu
Aamis	Film Festival	Fantasy Drama	1 October 2021	1 hour, 47 minutes	Assamese
Appathava Aattaya Pottutanga	Direct-to-Digital	Dramedy	8 October 2021	1 hour, 42 minutes	Tamil
Itlu Amma	Direct-to-Digital	Drama	8 October 2021	1 hour, 52 minutes	Telugu
Kaasav	Film Festival	Family Drama	8 October 2021	1 hour, 45 minutes	Marathi
Family Drama	Direct-to-Digital	Neo-noir	29 October 2021	2 hour, 12 minutes	Telugu
Yennanga Sir Unga Sattam	Direct-to-Digital	Drama	29 October 2021	2 hour, 17 minutes	Tamil
Thinkalazhcha Nishchayam	Film Festival	Dramedy	29 October 2021	1 hour, 49 minutes	Malayalam
Churuli	Film Festival	Sci-fi Horror	19 November 2021	1 hour, 54 minutes	Malayalam
Sivaranjiniyum Innum Sila Pengalum	Film Festival	Anthology	26 November 2021	2 hour, 3 minutes	Tamil
Bro	Direct-to-Digital	Romantic drama	26 November 2021	2 hour, 20 minutes	Telugu
WWW: Who Where Why	Direct-to-Digital	Computer screen thriller	24 December 2021	2 hours	Telugu
Madhuram	Direct-to-Digital	Romantic dramedy	24 December 2021	2 hour, 2 minutes	Malayalam
Kothanodi	Film Festival	Drama	2 January 2022	1 hour, 57 minutes	Assamese
Bhoothakaalam	Direct-to-Digital	Horror thriller	21 January 2022	1 hour, 45 minutes	Malayalam
Pandrikku Nandri Solli	Direct-to-Digital	Black Comedy	4 February 2022	1 hour, 47 minutes	Tamil
Freedom Fight	Direct-to-Digital	Anthology	11 February 2022	2 hour, 32 minutes	Malayalam
Clap	Direct-to-Digital	Sports Drama	11 March 2022	2 hour, 9 Minutes	Tamil / Telugu
Salute	Direct-to-Digital	Crime thriller	17 March 2022	2 hour, 25 minutes	Malayalam
Antakshari	Direct-to-Digital	Thriller	22 April 2022	2 hour, 1 minutes	Malayalam
Puzhu	Direct-to-Digital	Psychological drama	13 May 2022	2 hour, 2 minutes	Malayalam
Seththumaan	Direct-to-Digital	Drama	27 May 2022	1 hour, 52 minutes	Tamil
Innale Vare	Direct-to-Digital	Mystery	8 June 2022	2 hour, 16 minutes	Malayalam
Paka	Film Festival	Drama	7 July 2022	1 hour, 40 minutes	Malayalam
Sundari Gardens	Direct-to-Digital	Romantic drama	2 September 2022	1 hour, 51 minutes	Malayalam
Eesho	Direct-to-Digital	Drama thriller	5 October 2022	1 hour, 47 minutes	Malayalam
Appan	Direct-to-Digital	Drama	28 October 2022	2 hour, 9 minutes	Malayalam
Anel Meley Pani Thuli	Direct-to-Digital	Drama	18 November 2022		Tamil

== Exclusive international distribution ==
=== TV shows ===
Title	Genre	Original network	Original release	Exclusive premiere	Exclusive no. of seasons	Language
Lincoln Rhyme: Hunt for the Bone Collector	Crime	NBC	10 January 2020	25 June 2020	1(Season 1)	English
Agatha Christie's Poirot	Drama	I TV	8 January 1983	30 July 2020	13 (Season 1 to 13)	English
Coyote	Crime	CBS	7 January 2021	18 March 2021	1 (Season 1)	English
Woke	Comedy	Hulu	9 September 2020	15 April 2021	2 (Season 1 and 2)	English
Leonardo	Historical drama	Rai 1	6 April 2021	8 April 2021	1 (Season 1)	English
Monsterland	Anthology	Hulu	2 October 2020	30 June 2021	1 (Season 1)	English
Fantasy Island	Drama	Fox	10 August 2021	17 August 2021	1 (Season 1)	English
Magpie Murders	Drama	PBS; BritBox	10 February 2022	17 February 2022	1 (Season 1)	English
The ABC Murders	Crime	BBC One	26 December 2018	28 April 2022	1 (Season 1)	English
Ordeal by Innocence	Drama	BBC	15 April 2018	12 May 2022	1 (Season 1)	English
The Pale Horse	Drama	BBC One	9 February 2020	19 May 2022	1 (Season 1)	English
Why Didn't They Ask Evans?	Drama	BritBox	14 April 2022	26 May 2022	1 (Season 1)	English

== See also ==
- List of Amazon India originals
- List of JioHotstar original films
- List of JioHotstar original programming
- List of Netflix India original programming
- List of ZEE5 original programming
