= AAPI =

AAPI may refer to:

- Asian Americans and Pacific Islanders (Asian Pacific Americans), an ethnic classification in the US
- American Association of Physicians of Indian Origin
- Nazma Aapi (born 1999), the stage name of Indian comedian Saloni Gaur

== See also ==
- Asian American and Pacific Islander Policy Research Consortium (AAPIPRC)
