= Piyush =

Piyush is a Hindu masculine given name that means "milk" or "nectar." It is a Sanskrit word that is often associated with purity, sweetness, and immortality. Notable people with the name include:

- Piyush Chawla (born 1988), Indian cricketer
- Piyush Goyal (born 1964), Indian politician
- Piyush "Bobby" Jindal (born 1971), American politician
- Piyush Jha, Indian author, film director and screenwriter
- Piyush Mishra (born 1963), Indian film and theatre actor, music director, lyricist, singer, and scriptwriter
- Piyush Ranade (born 1983), Indian television and film actor
- Piyush Trivedi (born 1958), Indian academician and educationist
