= Scam 2010: The Subrata Roy Saga =

Upcoming Indian television series

- Genre: Financial thriller; Biography; Drama
- Based on: The Scam 2010: The Subrata Roy Saga
- Country of origin: India
- Original language: Hindi

Scam 2010: The Subrata Roy Saga is an upcoming Indian Hindi-language biographical financial thriller streaming television series. It is based on the life of Indian businessman Subrata Roy, the founder of the Sahara India Pariwar. The series is directed by Hansal Mehta and is part of the Scam franchise, which previously included Scam 1992 and Scam 2003.
