= Uncommon Sense with Saloni =

Indian comedy web series

- Genre: Comedy
- Created by: Yellow Montage
- Written by: Abhishek Yadav; Jasmeet Singh Bhatia; Shubham Gaur; Sunil (Rofl 2.0); Suprith Kundar; Nikhil Vijay
- Directed by: Prem Mistry; Sachin Negi
- Starring: Saloni Gaur; Shubham Gaur; Jasmeet Singh Bhatia; Sachin Negi; Badri Chavan
- Music by: Shane Kahalehau; Deeptanshu Mokashi
- Country of origin: India
- Original language: Hindi
- No. of seasons: 1
- No. of episodes: 20

Production
- Producers: Abhishek Yadav; Shubham Gaur; Prem Mistry
- Cinematography: Ashwin Kadamboor
- Editor: Akash Bundhoo

Original release
- Network: SonyLIV
- Release: 5 November 2020

Uncommon Sense with Saloni is a 2020 Indian comedy show that premiered on SonyLIV on 5 November 2020. It was directed by Prem Mistry and Sachin Negi, starring Saloni Gaur, Shubham Gaur, Jasmeet Singh Bhatia, Sachin Negi and Badri Chavan. Saloni Gaur, commonly known by her comic name Nazma Aapi, is a contemporary comedian and impressionist. She marked her web series debut with this show.

== Cast ==
- Saloni Gaur
- Shubham Gaur
- Jasmeet Singh
- Sachin Negi
- Ramesh Joshi
- Badri Chavan
- Shivani Joshi
- Abhishek Yadav
- Ranjan Raj
- Aashna Haria
- Yash Purohit
- Khushbu Baid
- Abhinav Anand
- Rajesh Yadav
- Sagar Malhan
- Ashish Trivedi
- Ayush Anand
- Rajendra Chawla
- Vaibhav Bundhoo
- Saad Bilgrami
- Arun Kushwah
- Tithi Raaj
- Raju Kher
- Abhishake Jha
- Jaimini Pathak
- Visshesh Tiwari
- Srishti Shrivastava
- Luv Vispute
- Parul Gulati
- Sahil Verma
- Ahsaas Channa
- Ayushi Gupta
- Durin Das
- Komal Chhabria

== Episodes ==
=== Season 1 ===
Series	Episodes	Originally released
1	20	5 November 2020

No. overall	No. in season	Title	Directed by	Original release date
1	1	"Students and Unemployment"	Prem Mistry; Sachin Negi	5 November 2020
2	2	"Uncommon Diwali 2020"	Prem Mistry; Sachin Negi	13 November 2020
3	3	"Journalism and Fake News"	Prem Mistry; Sachin Negi	20 November 2020
4	4	"Healthcare in India"	Prem Mistry; Sachin Negi	27 November 2020
5	5	"Cyber Scams in India"	Prem Mistry; Sachin Negi	4 December 2020
6	6	"Gaming in India"	Prem Mistry; Sachin Negi	11 December 2020
7	7	"Bharatiya Trolling"	Prem Mistry; Sachin Negi	18 December 2020
8	8	"Christmas and New Years Special"	Prem Mistry; Sachin Negi	25 December 2020
9	9	"Women Safety in India"	Prem Mistry; Sachin Negi	31 December 2020
10	10	"Education System in India"	Prem Mistry; Sachin Negi	8 January 2021
11	11	"Toxic Workplaces in India"	Prem Mistry; Sachin Negi	15 January 2021
12	12	"Mental Health in India"	Prem Mistry; Sachin Negi	22 January 2021
13	13	"Infrastructure in India"	Prem Mistry; Sachin Negi	29 January 2021
14	14	"Environmental Issues in India"	Prem Mistry; Sachin Negi	5 February 2021
15	15	"Valentine's Day"	Prem Mistry; Sachin Negi	12 February 2021
16	16	"Corruption in India"	Prem Mistry; Sachin Negi	19 February 2021
17	17	"Artistic Freedom in India"	Prem Mistry; Sachin Negi	26 February 2021
18	18	"Banking in India"	Prem Mistry; Sachin Negi	5 March 2021
19	19	"Parenting in India"	Prem Mistry; Sachin Negi	12 March 2021
20	20	"Parenting in India"	Prem Mistry; Sachin Negi	19 March 2021

== Reception ==
=== Critical reviews ===
The show has received mixed reviews.

A reviewer for Film Companion criticized the show for being "Too Silly For The Serious Topic It Wants To Discuss". She added "For the show to work, it either needs much sharper writing or a full-blown commitment to silliness without the baggage of an ‘issue’ to discuss."

Tatsam Mukherjee of Firstpost said "The first episode of Uncommon Sense with Saloni is well... adequate, also served with a segment featuring Nazma Aapi, Gaur's most popular avatar. In a time, when there are no such shows (barring Kamra's) maybe we should be thankful for this one. It might improve in the episodes to come."

The show received a rating of 6.6/10 on Digit (magazine).

== Controversy ==
Bollywood actress Kangana Ranaut lashed out at Saloni for mimicking her.
