= Scam 2003 =

2023 Indian financial crime television series

- Genre: Financial thriller; Biography; Drama
- Based on: Telgi Scam: Reporter's ki Diary by Sanjay Singh 2003 India Stamp Paper Counterfeiting
- Showrunner: Hansal Mehta
- Written by: Karan Vyas; Kiran Yadnyopavit; Kedar Patankar
- Story by: Sanjay Singh
- Directed by: Tushar Hiranandani
- Creative director: Tanvi Chheda
- Starring: Gagan Dev Riar; Mukesh Tiwari; Sana Amin Sheikh; Bharat Jadhav; Shaad Randhawa; Dinesh Lal Yadav
- Music by: Ishaan Chhabra
- Country of origin: India
- Original language: Hindi
- No. of seasons: 1
- No. of episodes: 10

Production
- Executive producers: Kartik R. Iyer; Tanvi Chheda; Deepak Segal
- Producer: Sameer Nair
- Production location: India
- Cinematography: Stanley Mudda
- Editor: Kunal Walve
- Production companies: Studio NEXT; Applause Entertainment

Original release
- Network: SonyLIV

Scam 2003: The Telgi Story is a 2023 Indian Hindi-language biographical financial thriller streaming television series on SonyLIV directed by Tushar Hiranandani, with Hansal Mehta serving as the co-director. Based on a true story of stamped paper counterfeitings committed by Abdul Karim Telgi in early 2000s, the series is inspired from Sanjay Singh's book Telgi Scam: Reporter's ki Diary. It is the second installment in Scam franchise following Scam 1992.

It stars Gagan Dev Riar as the protagonist Abdul Karim Telgi with Mukesh Tiwari, Sana Amin Sheikh, Bharat Jadhav and Shaad Randhawa in pivotal roles. The first 5 episodes of the series released on 1 September 2023 via SonyLIV and the remaining 5 released on 5 November 2023.

== Premise ==
It follows the real-life story of Abdul Karim Telgi who was involved in the 2003 stamp paper counterfeiting scandal worth of INR 30,000 crores.

== Cast ==
- Gagan Dev Riar as Abdul Karim Telgi
- Aniruddh Roy as Inspector Balekundri
- Hemang Vyas as Kaushal Jhaveri
- Mukesh Tiwari as Suryapratap Gehlot
- Talat Aziz as Shaukat
- Sana Amin Sheikh as Nafisa
- Bharat Jadhav as Durgesh Bharade
- Shaad Randhawa as Sheikh
- Shashank Ketkar as Jayant Karmarkar a.k.a. JK
- Nikhil Ratnaparkhi as Advocate Ganesh Kamble
- Dinesh Lal Yadav as Pramod Jaisingh
- Sameer Dharmadhikari as Tukaram
- Salim Siddiqui as Vitthal
- Bharat Dabholkar as Jadhav
- Aniruddh Roy as Inspector Balekundri
- Bhavana Balsavar as Garima Talpade
- Mohd Yusuf Khan as Suleiman
- Nandu Madhav as Inspector Madhukar Dombe
- Sharad Jadhav as Inspector Rawat
- Vivek Mishra as Madhusudhan Mishra
- Sanjay Borkar as Bapat
- Abhishek Khandekar as Chhetre
- Kirandeep Kaur Sran as bar dancer Parveen
- Aman Verma as Commissioner of Police Jagdish Suri (based on R S Sharma)
- Iravati Harshe as DCP Malti Halani

== Episodes ==
No.	Title	Directed by	Written by	Original release date
Volume 1
1	"Paisa Kamaya Nahin Banaya Jata Hain"	Tushar Hiranandani	Karan Vyas and Kiran Yadnyopavit	1 September 2023
2	"Choomantar"	Tushar Hiranandani	Karan Vyas and Kiran Yadnyopavit	1 September 2023
3	"Khota Sikka"	Tushar Hiranandani	Karan Vyas and Kiran Yadnyopavit	1 September 2023
4	"Mubarak Ho Aapko Stamp Paper Hua Hain"	Tushar Hiranandani	Karan Vyas and Kiran Yadnyopavit	1 September 2023
5	"I Love You"	Tushar Hiranandani	Karan Vyas and Kiran Yadnyopavit	1 September 2023
Volume 2
6	"Abracadabra"	Tushar Hiranandani	Karan Vyas and Kiran Yadnyopavit	3 November 2023
7	"Logic Ka Magic"	Tushar Hiranandani	Karan Vyas and Kiran Yadnyopavit	3 November 2023
8	"Mumbai Ka King"	Tushar Hiranandani	Karan Vyas and Kiran Yadnyopavit	3 November 2023
9	"Bina Daant Ka Sher"	Tushar Hiranandani	Karan Vyas and Kiran Yadnyopavit	3 November 2023
10	"Truth Serum"	Tushar Hiranandani	Karan Vyas and Kiran Yadnyopavit	3 November 2023

== Production ==
=== Development ===
The series was first officially announced on 24 March 2022, by SonyLIV and Applause Entertainment.

=== Filming ===
The series officially started filming from April 2022.

=== Marketing ===
On 25 May 2022, SonyLIV first announced the series officially in their YouTube channel. The teaser with a release date was announced on 4 August 2023.

== Litigation ==
In December 2022, Mumbai Court refused to halt the publication of the web series plead by Sana Irfan Talikoti, Telgi's daughter who filed a lawsuit to get a restraining order against the web series' release. Sana has requested an injunction to prevent its distribution, arguing that the project's makers did not have the family's approval before moving forward. Applause Entertainment Pvt Ltd, its director Hansal Mehta, general manager Prasoon Garg, and Sony Liv were all named defendants in the lawsuit.

Sana claims in her lawsuit that the series is based on a book that contained factual errors. She asserted that the web series infringed the family's rights to secrecy, decency, and respect.

== Release ==
The first part with 5 episodes was released on 1 September 2023 via SonyLIV. The second part with the remaining 5 episodes was released on 3 November 2023.

== Reception ==
The series received generally positive reviews. Review aggregator website Rotten Tomatoes assigned 67% "fresh" rating based on 6 reviews.

== See also ==
- Scam 1992
- List of SonyLIV original programming
