= Boomerang: Travels in the New Third World =

Book by Michael Lewis

Boomerang Travels in the New Third World
- Hardcover edition
- Author: Michael Lewis
- Language: English
- Subject: Finance
- Genre: Financial thriller
- Publisher: W. W. Norton & Company
- Publication date: October 3, 2011
- Publication place: United States
- Media type: Print (Hardback)
- Pages: 224 pp.
- ISBN: 978-0393081817
- Preceded by: The Big Short
- Followed by: Flash Boys

Boomerang: Travels in the New Third World is a non-fiction book by Michael Lewis about macroeconomic consequences of cheap financing available during the 2000s. The book was released on October 3, 2011 by W. W. Norton & Company. The book was published in the UK in 2011 by Allen Lane under the title Boomerang: The Meltdown Tour.

== Overview ==
Boomerang expands on the themes discussed in his previous book, The Big Short, and is based on the articles Lewis wrote for Vanity Fair magazine.

While The Big Short focused on events in the United States, Boomerang emphasized the global consequences of the 2008 financial crisis, with sections on the Greek government-debt crisis, 2008–2011 Icelandic financial crisis and the Post-2008 Irish economic downturn.

Lewis revisited his interviews with hedge fund manager Kyle Bass, which were omitted from The Big Short due to Bass's focus on the possible global consequences of sovereign debt defaults. Bass's predictions were later proved mostly accurate.

== Reception ==
In his new book on the seemingly permanent financial crisis, Boomerang: Travels in the New Third World, Lewis shows again why he is the leading journalist of his generation. He writes about important matters — the most important matters — and he writes about them so amusingly that he can permanently change your point of view, even of things you already had a settled opinion about. Who sees baseball the same way after his Moneyball? Football announcers seldom talked about the immense importance of the left tackle before The Blind Side. And, thanks to “Boomerang,” a collection of financial-disaster reports from Iceland, Ireland, Greece, Germany and California, few will be able to think of Germans without recalling what Lewis memorably describes as a national obsession with excrement. In typical Lewis fashion, a bodily aperture becomes a lens for seeing Germany’s role in the global debt calamity.

—Review by Forbes

Michael Lewis possesses the rare storyteller’s ability to make virtually any subject both lucid and compelling. In his new book, “Boomerang,” he actually makes topics like European sovereign debt, the International Monetary Fund and the European Central Bank not only comprehensible but also fascinating — even, or especially, to readers who rarely open the business pages or watch CNBC. The book could not be more timely given the worries about Europe’s deepening debt crisis and the recent warning issued by Christine Lagarde, managing director of the I.M.F, that “the current economic situation is entering a dangerous phase.”

—Review by The New York Times
