= Abdul Karim Telgi =

Indian convicted counterfeiter (1961–2017)

Abdul Kareem Telgi
- Born: 29 July 1961; Khanapur, Belgaum, India
- Died: 23 October 2017 (aged 56); Bengaluru, Karnataka, India
- Criminal charges: Stamp paper counterfeiting
- Penalty: 13 years rigorous imprisonment.

Abdul Karim Telgi (29 July 1961 – 23 October 2017) was an Indian counterfeiter. He earned money by printing counterfeit stamp paper in India, with the size of the scam estimated to be around ₹200 billion (US$2.1 billion).

== Early life ==
Abdul Karim's mother was Shariefa bee Telgi, and his father Ladsaab Telgi was an employee of Indian Railways. His father died while he was young. Abdul Karim paid for his education at Sarvodaya Vidyalaya Khanapur, an English medium school, by selling fruits and vegetables on trains. He later studied at Gogte College of Commerce, Belgaum. He completed his m.Com in 1984. Eventually, he moved to the Gulf, Saudi Arabia. Seven years later, he returned to India, where he began a counterfeiting career, originally focusing on fake passports. He started a business to export manpower to Saudi Arabia and opened a company, Arabian Metro Travels at New Marine Lines. He used to create several fake documents that would facilitate laborers' smooth passage at the airport even if their passport had an ECR (emigration check required) stamp or other issues that could raise red flags for immigration officials. This practice was called "pushing" in the parlance of manpower exporters.

== Counterfeiting charges ==
Abdul Karim moved to more complex counterfeiting when he began to counterfeit stamp paper. He appointed 300 people as agents who sold the fakes to bulk purchasers, including banks, insurance companies, and stock brokerage firms. The size of the scam was estimated to be around ₹200 billion (US$2.1 billion) One aspect of the scandal that caused much concern was that it required the involvement of many police officers and other government employees including Nikhil Kothari, an Assistant Police Investigator who was found to have a net worth of over ₹1 billion (US$10 million), despite making a salary of only ₹9,000 (US$93) per month. Several police officers were implicated in the case. Pradip Sawant, then Deputy Commissioner of Police, Special Branch, Mumbai, was discharged but subsequently reinstated after being found innocent. Then police officer S M Mushrif, known for the book Who killed Karkare took decisive measures in this case.

On 17 January 2006, Abdul Karim and several associates were sentenced to 30 years rigorous imprisonment. On 28 June 2007, Telgi was sentenced to rigorous imprisonment for 13 years for another aspect of the scandal. He was also fined ₹10 billion (US$100 million). The Income Tax Department requested that Telgi's property be confiscated to pay the fine. He had been in jail for 13 years until his death in 2017 .

== Death ==
Abdul Karim was suffering from HIV, meningitis and died on 23 October 2017 at Victoria Hospital, Bengaluru. He was also suffering from diabetes and hypertension for over 20 years.

== In popular culture ==
- Mudrank: The Stamp is a 2009 Indian Hindi-language thriller film directed by Shakir Shaikh based on the stamp scandal.
- Paper is a 2020 Indian web series by Ullu based on the stamp scandal and stars Rohit Roy as Telgi.
- Money Mafia is a documentary series that showcases the details of eight scandals in India. The first episode, Fake Stamp Papers, is about Telgi's scandal.
- Scam 2003 is an Indian web series directed by Tushar Hiranandani and produced by Applause Entertainment and stars Gagan Dev Riar as Telgi. It is inspired from Sanjay Singh's book Telgi Scam: Reporter's ki Diary.
