= 13th (TV series) =

- Genre: comedy drama
- Created by: Sameer Mishra
- Written by: Sameer Mishra
- Directed by: Nishil Sheth
- Starring: Paresh Pahuja; Gagan Dev Riar; Girija Oak Godbole; Pradnya Motghare
- Music by: Goyell Saab,Praveen Jain,Ashutosh Chaturvedi
- Country of origin: India
- Original language: Hindi
- No. of seasons: 1
- No. of episodes: 5

Production
- Producer: Abhishek Dhandharia
- Cinematography: Pratik Parmar
- Editor: Sruthy Sukumaran
- Production company: About Films

Original release
- Network: SonyLIV
- Release: 1 October 2025 – present

13th is an Indian Hindi-language comedy drama web series created by Sameer Mishra and directed by Nishil Sheth. Produced by Abhishek Dhandharia under the banner of About Films, the series stars Paresh Pahuja and Gagan Dev Riar in lead roles, alongside Girija Oak Godbole, Pradnya Motghare, Abhishek Ranjan, Keshav Mehta, Jai Kishan, Ashish Raghav, Ajay Chakraborty and Rajendra Bhatia. It is premiered on SonyLIV on 1 October 2025.The BGM has been done by Goyell Saab, Ashutosh Chaturvedi & Praveen Jain. Songs have been composed by Praveen Jain & Joy Banerjee.

== Premise ==
The series follows Ritesh, a successful venture capitalist who decides to pause his corporate career to support his mentor MT Sir. Years earlier, MT Sir’s guidance shaped Ritesh’s journey; in return, Ritesh helps him realise his dream of launching an ed-tech start-up. The story explores themes of mentorship, gratitude and lessons that extend beyond traditional classrooms.

== Cast ==
- Paresh Pahuja as Ritesh
- Gagan Dev Riar as MT Sir
- Girija Oak Godbole as Mansi
- Pradnya Motghare as Sheena
- Abhishek Ranjan as Ishaan
- Keshav Mehta as Abhishek
- Jai Kishan as Mudit
- Ashish Raghav as Sahil
- Sahil Sharma as Ranjeet
- Rajendra Bhatia as Bahadur Singh

== Production ==
The series is produced by Abhishek Dhandharia under banner About Films. Sameer Mishra is credited as the creator and writer, and Nishil Sheth as director. The official trailer was released on 19 September 2025.

== Episodes ==
The first season of 13th: Some Lessons Aren't Taught in Classrooms consists of five episodes.

Season 1 (2025)
No.	Title	Directed by	Written by	Length	Original release date
1	Paanch Sawaal	Nishil Sheth	Sameer Mishra	42 minutes	1 October 2025
2	Kuch Bhi Ho Sakta Hai	Nishil Sheth	Sameer Mishra	35 minutes	1 October 2025
3	Cheating	Nishil Sheth	Sameer Mishra	31 minutes	1 October 2025
4	The Clock Is Ticking	Nishil Sheth	Sameer Mishra	29 minutes	1 October 2025
5	Handshake	Nishil Sheth	Sameer Mishra	37 minutes	1 October 2025

== Release ==
The series premiered on SonyLIV on 1 October 2025.

== Reception ==
Archika Khurana of The Times of India rated the series 3 out of 5 stars, calling it "A sincere journey where mentorship meets everyday wisdom".

Abhishek Srivastava of Moneycontrol described the series as "a heartfelt series" and noted that it captured the bond between a mentor and student while also reflecting the pressures of start-up culture.

Simran Khan of Times Now reviewed the series as "a heartfelt drama that struggles to engage".

Asmita Pant of CNBCTV18 called the show “a tender watch with strong performances
