= Gagan Dev Riar =

Indian actor

- Born: New Delhi
- Occupation: Actor
- Years active: 2010–present

Gagan Dev Riar is an Indian actor. He is mainly known for his roles in Scam 2003, A Suitable Boy, Sonchiriya.

== Early life ==
Riar was born in New Delhi and brought up in Pathankot, Punjab.

== Career ==
He started his career as a theatre actor. He played noted roles in plays like Piya Behrupiya, Stories in a Song, Monsoon Wedding: The Musical, Detective 9-2-11, Aaj Rang Hai and Baaghi Albele.

He made his Bollywood debut in the year 2014 with Akarsh Khurana’s directed tv film Sunsilk Real FM and played the role of Jwahar. Then he appeared in Sudev Nair’s directed tv series Not Fit as Raunak.

In 2019, he acted as Khalifa in Abhishek Chaubey’s directed film Sonchiriya. Again, he appeared in Mira Nair and Shimit Amin’s directed tv series A Suitable Boy as Pran Kapoor.

In the year 2023, he came to limelight with playing as the protagonist Abdul Karim Telgi in Tushar Hiranandani’s directed tv series Scam 2003: The Telgi Story. His performance in Scam 2003 praised by audience and critics wrote very positive quotes about him in film's reviews. Shubra Gupta of Indian Express said: "Gagan Dev Riar as Abdul Karim Telgi is terrific". Yatamanyu Narain of News 18 stated: "Gagan Dev Riar as Abdul Telgi is the heart and soul of Hansal Mehta's show". Bhavna Agarwal of India Today stated: "Gagan Dev Riar nails it as Telgi".

== Filmography ==
Year	Movie/TV Series	Roles	Refs.
2014	Sunsilk Real FM	Jwahar	
2015	Not Fit	Raunakk	
2019	Sonchiriya	Khalifa	
2020	A Suitable Boy	Pran Kapoor	
2023	Scam 2003	Abdul Karim Telgi	
2025	Costao	CBI Officer Addnl SP Sameer Narang	
2025	13th: Some Lessons Aren't Taught in Classrooms	MT Sir	

=== Theatre plays ===
- Piya Behrupiya
- Stories in a Song
- Monsoon Wedding:The Musical
- Detective 9-2-11
- Aaj Rang Hai
- Baaghi Albele
