= Pradip Sawant =

Indian Police Officer (born 1962)

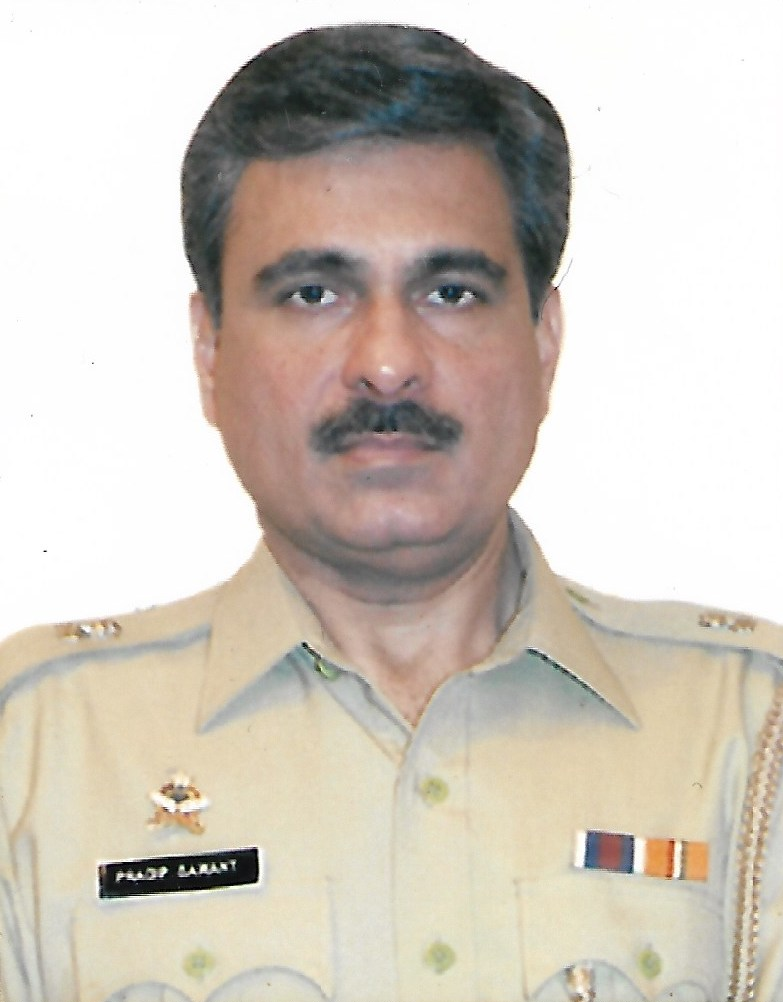
- DCP Pradip Sawant
- Born: 25 January 1962 (age 64); Thane, Maharashtra, India
- Other names: Pradeep Sawant; P.B. Sawant
- Education: Ramnarain Ruia College; University of Mumbai
- Police career
- Country: India
- Department: Mumbai Police
- Rank: Deputy commissioner of police
- Awards: President's Police Medal for Meritorious Service

Pradip Sawant (born 1962) is an Indian Police Officer, retired as the DCP Security Branch in Mumbai Police on 31st Jan 2020. He is a recipient of the President's Police Medal for Meritorious Service in 2002. He was behind more than 300 encounters in Mumbai during his stint as DCP (Detection Crime Branch) between the years 2000 and 2003.

He was suspended in 2004 for his alleged involvement in Telgi stamp paper scam, but was reinstated in 2009, and posted as DCP ATS Mumbai, after he was found innocent in June 2007.

== Early life and education ==
He completed his B.Sc. in Chemistry from Ramnarain Ruia College, Mumbai. He was selected as a Dy.Sp in Maharashtra Police through MPSC exam, in 1986. He is said to have topped his batch at the Maharashtra Police Academy in Nashik, reported by Outlook India.

== Career ==
Sawant was instrumental in breaking the back of several underworld gangs including Chhota Shakeel, Chhota Rajan, Ashwin Naik, Arun Gawli between 1998 and 2003 following a spurt in gangland shoot-outs in 1998.

He also detected the murder case of Bharat Shah, Owner of Roopam chain stores who was shot dead by Dawood gang in 1998.

He was responsible for arresting gangsters, affiliated to Chhota Shakeel (Dawood gang) for attempted murder on Milind Vaidya, former Mayor of Mumbai in March 1999; in the attack, 3 people were killed and 7 others including Vaidya were seriously injured.

In December 1999, his team arrested three alleged terrorists who had abetted the hijacking of the Indian Airlines flight 814 from Kathmandu in Nepal. Pradip Sawant had formed special squads that arrested 486 alleged gangsters and shot dead 156 criminals in encounters.

=== Positions held ===
Tenure	Post
1987–1988	Probationary Deputy Superintendent of Police, Thane Rural, District
1988–1989	Deputy Superintendent of Police, Latur Sub Division
1989–1991	Deputy Superintendent of Police, Alibag Sub Division, Raigad District
1991–1996	Deputation to ONGC, Mumbai as Jt. Director Vigilance
1996– 1997	Additional Deputy Commissioner, C.I.D. Intelligence Mumbai
1997–1998	Assistant Commissioner of Police, Byculla Division, Mumbai
1988–2000	Assistant Commissioner of Police, D-1 South, Detection Crime Branch, Mumbai
2000–2003	Deputy Commissioner of Police, Detection, Crime Branch, Mumbai
2003–2004	Deputy Commissioner of Police, Special Branch, Mumbai
2009–2015	Deputy Commissioner of Police, Anti-Terrorism Squad, Mumbai
2015–2017	Deputy Commissioner of Police, HQ 1, Licensing, Mumbai
May 2017– 2020	Deputy Commissioner of Police, Security, Mumbai

== Controversy ==
In January 2004, Sawant was booked under MCOCA and suspended for his alleged involvement in the multi-crore Abdul Karim Telgi fake stamp paper scam. On 27 June 2007, he along with Mumbai Police Commissioner RS Sharma, was discharged by the special Maharashtra Control of Organised Crime Act court in Pune in the fake stamps and stamp papers case for lack of evidence.

== Awards and recognition ==
- He was conferred with the President's Police Medal for Meritorious Service in 2002.
- He received the Deepak Jog Memorial trophy for the Best Investigating Officer for the year 2000.
- On 12 June 1998, Sawant gets the Best Crime Detection Award from Gopinath Munde, Deputy CM of Maharashtra at the Police Club, Mumbai.

== In popular culture ==
The 1999 Bollywood film Sarfarosh starring Aamir Khan is said to be inspired by Pradip Sawant. Often the character of ACP Ajay Singh Rathod, which was played by Aamir Khan in the film Sarfarosh is closely associated with Sawant.
