= Bharat Bhhagya Viddhaata =

2026 Indian film by Manoj Tapadia

- Theatrical release poster
- Directed by: Manoj Tapadia
- Screenplay by: Manoj Tapadia
- Story by: Manoj Tapadia
- Produced by: Kangana Ranaut; Babita Ashiwal; Shailesh R. Singh; Dhaval Gada; Adi Sharmaa
- Starring: Kangana Ranaut; Girija Oak; Smita Tambe; Esha Dey
- Cinematography: Ayan Sil
- Edited by: Dev Rao Jadhav
- Music by: Songs: G. V. Prakash Kumar; Composition: Krsna Solo; Score: Sanchit Balhara and Ankit Balhara
- Production companies: Pen Studios; Manikarnika Films; Paramhans Creations; Eunoia Films; Floating Rocks Entertainment
- Distributed by: Pen Marudhar
- Release date: 12 June 2026
- Running time: 127 minutes
- Country: India
- Language: Hindi
- Budget: ₹60 crore
- Box office: ₹8.16 crore

Bharat Bhhagya Viddhaata (transl. Dispenser Of India's Destiny) is a 2026 Indian Hindi-language thriller film written and directed by Manoj Tapadia & co-produced by Kangana Ranaut. It stars Kangana Ranaut, Girija Oak and Smita Tambe. Based on true events, the film is inspired by the bravery of doctors, nurses and hospital staff who protected the patients during the 2008 Mumbai attacks at Cama Hospital. It released on 12 June 2026. Movie proved to be a disaster at box office.

== Plot ==
It is being presented in the background of the 26/11 Mumbai terror attacks. The film tries to bring the lives, times, contributions and sacrifices of health workers, including nurses, in the aftermath of the terrorist attacks.

It is based on Mumbai's Cama Hospital.

It has been inspired by lives of many health workers including nurse Anjali Kulthe, who helped save 20 pregnant women.

== Cast ==
- Kangana Ranaut as Geeta Madhav Gandhare
- Girija Oak as Sheetal Revagade
- Smita Tambe as Trupti Takle
- Esha Dey as Babita Adsule
- Prasad Oak as Kedar Thatte
- Sayaji Shinde as Inspector Kamble
- Amruta Namdev as Divya Bansode
- Priya Berde as Harshada Jorvekar
- Zahid Khan as Ajmal Kasab
- Aditya Mishra as Abu Ismail
- Sushama Deshpande as Rupa Gandhare
- Sunil Kumar Palwal as ACP Dayanand Sathe
- Yogesh Kelkar as Harivardhankar
- Vitthal Kale as Subhash Mama
- Vijay Gokhale as Babbanrao Zambre
- Yashodhan Mavlankar as Anand Pauskar
- Jayshree Mehta as Ganga Maushi
- Asha Shelar as Dr. Maya Kadam
- Suhita Thatte as Deena Danghe
- Rasika Agashe as Mohini Mithe

== Production ==
The film is based on the events surrounding the 2008 Mumbai attacks and the efforts of hospital staff at Cama Hospital. During the film's promotion, Kangana Ranaut revealed that actor John Abraham had previously owned the title Bharat Bhhagya Viddhaata and allowed the makers to use it without charge. The film was shot over 28 days on a restrained budget of 15 crores.

== Release ==
=== Theatrical ===
The film was theatrically released on 12 June 2026. It earned around ₹4 crore at the box office on its first weekend. There was reportedly a 45% growth in collections on its second day. Bollywood Hungama reported its worldwide collections to be ₹5.02 crore on its third day. The film was a box office failure, having earned ₹5 crore in its first week.

=== Home media ===
The film began streaming on ZEE5 from 14 August 2026.

== Reception ==
Vinamra Mathur of Firstpost also gave the film 4 out of 5 stars, praising its decision to foreground hope, resilience and humanity rather than focusing solely on the brutality of the attacks. He also commended the performances and the film's emotional restraint. Yatamanyu Narain of News18 rated the film 3.5 out of 5 stars and praised Ranaut's performance while appreciating the film's tribute to the nurses who risked their lives during the siege. He noted that the film effectively balanced emotional drama with the tension of a real-life crisis. Aaj Tak awarded the film 3.5 out of 5 stars and praised its portrayal of courage in the face of terror, highlighting its emotional impact and performances. Devesh Sharma of Filmfare awarded the film 3.5 out of 5 stars and praised its respectful treatment of real events, the performances of the ensemble cast and its tribute to everyday heroes. Dhaval Roy of The Times of India also rated the film 3.5 out of 5 stars, commending its tense narrative and emotional depth while noting that some portions of the screenplay could have been tighter

Shubhra Gupta of The Indian Express gave the film 3 out of 5 stars and described it as a gripping film led by a resurgent Ranaut, appreciating its focus on the bravery of hospital staff during the attacks while praising the film's focus on the hospital staff and its recreation of the tense atmosphere, though she noted shortcomings in its execution. Rishabh Suri of Hindustan Times also awarded the film 3 out of 5 stars, praising the performances and cinematography while criticising aspects of the screenplay and portions of the latter half. Saibal Chatterjee of NDTV rated the film 3 out of 5 stars and observed that Ranaut ensured her character never overshadowed the larger ensemble narrative, appreciating the film's commitment to telling the story of collective heroism. Nandini Ramnath of Scroll.in described the film as "a gripping account of uncommon courage against terror", praising its focus on ordinary individuals displaying extraordinary bravery during the attacks. Writing for Variety India, Adit Ganguly praised the film's humanistic approach and its portrayal of healthcare workers as everyday heroes. He commended the film for shifting attention away from conventional narratives of heroism and towards the resilience, compassion and sacrifice displayed by medical professionals during the attacks.
