= Burey Bhi Hum Bhale Bhi Hum =

- Genre: Comedy drama
- Created by: Hats Off Productions
- Directed by: Sameer Kulkarni
- Starring: see below
- Opening theme: "Burey Bhi Hum Bhale Bhi Hum" by ??
- Country of origin: India
- Original language: Hindi
- No. of episodes: 75

Production
- Executive producer: Harshada Potnis
- Producers: JD Majethia & Aatish Kapadia
- Running time: Approx. 25 minutes

Original release
- Network: StarPlus
- Release: 16 March – 26 June 2009

Burey Bhi Hum Bhale Bhi Hum (transl. Even Though We are Bad, We are Good) is an Indian comedy-drama television series on StarPlus. The series premiered on 16 March 2009 and ended on 26 June 2009. It was produced by JD Majethia and Aatish Kapadia under the banner Hats Off productions.

== Plot ==
Based on Gujarati backdrop, it features the story of two brothers who live together in a same house with their families.

== Cast ==
- Firoz Irani as Ambalal Popat − Head of Popat family; Mansukh and Bhallu's father; Kaivalya, Baabli, Gargi, Jai and Hetal's grandfather; Yashvi's great-grandfather; Pranal's best friend
- Arvind Vaidya as Pranlal − Ambalal's best friend
- Ashiesh Roy as Mansukh Popat − Ambalal's elder son; Bhallu's brother; Rasila's husband; Kaivalya, Baabli and Gargi's father; Yashvi's grandfather
- Harshada Khanvilkar as Rasila Popat − Mansukh's wife; Kaivalya, Baabli and Gargi's mother; Yashvi's grandmother
- Monoj Goel as Bhallu Popat − Ambalal's younger son; Mansukh's brother; Sushila's husband; Jai and Hetal's father
- Priti Joshi as Sushila Popat − Bhallu's wife; Jai and Hetal's mother
- Piyush Ranade as Kaivalya Popat − Mansukh and Rasila's elder son; Baabli and Gargi's brother; Jai and Hetal's cousin; Jyotika's husband; Yashvi's father
- Shital Thakkar as Jyotika Popat − Kaivalya's wife; Yashvi's mother
- Rutu Gaglani as Yashvi Popat − Kaivalya and Jyotika's daughter
- Srman Jain as Baabli Popat − Mansukh and Rasila's younger son; Kaivalya and Gargi's brother; Jai and Hetal's cousin
- Bijal Batvia as Gargi Popat − Mansukh and Rasila's daughter; Kaivalya and Baabli's sister; Jai and Hetal's cousin; Gourang's wife
- Nitin Jain as Gourang − Gargi's husband
- Ashutosh Kulkarni as Jai Popat − Bhallu and Sushila's son; Hetal's brother; Kaivalya, Baabli and Gargi's cousin; Krishna's husband
- Parakh Madan as Krishna Popat − Jai's wife
- Shruti Bapna as Hetal Popat − Bhallu and Sushila's daughter; Jai's sister; Kaivalya, Baabli and Gargi's cousin; Krishna's husband
- Prasad Barve as Barkiya − House servant
- Rocky Verma as Tapori − A thief

== Production ==
Speaking about the series, Vivek Bahl, Senior Creative Director of Star Plus said, "Burey Bhi Hum Bhale Bhi Hum is a Gujarati family drama revolving around characters we will love... and love to hate. With the launch of Burey Bhi Hum, Bhale Bhi Hum, we aim to give our viewers even more variety in our prime time line-up."

In May 2009, some of the cast members were fasting in real during a fasting sequence in the series. In the same month on 27, the series which aired at 7:30 pm (IST) was shifted half an hour early due to low viewership compared to rival shows in the same slot.

== Reception ==
Hindustan Times stated, "One family is very nice, the other family is not at all nice. They all look like they should be in a saas-bahu (mother in law- daughter in law) soap (in terms of their clothes, etc), and they’re not that funny, but hey, it’s a comedy."
