= Girija Oak =

Indian actress (born 1987)

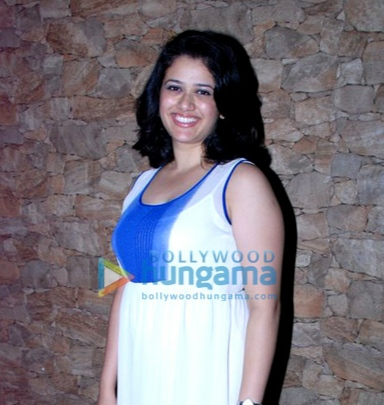
- Oak at Poshter Boyz event
- Born: Girija Oak; 27 December 1987 (age 38); Nagpur, Maharashtra, India
- Education: Thakur College of Science and Commerce
- Occupation: Actress
- Years active: 2005–present
- Spouse: Suhrud Godbole (m. 2011)
- Children: 1
- Father: Girish Oak

Girija Oak Godbole (née Oak) is an Indian actress who appears in Marathi and Hindi cinema and is best known for her performances in Taare Zameen Par (2007), Shor in the City (2010) and Jawan (2023).

== Career ==
Oak made her debut on the big screen at the age of 15. She acted in Marathi movies including Goshta Choti Dongraevadhi, Gulmohar, Manini and Adgule Madgule.

Her first Marathi television show as a lead actress was Zee Marathi's Lajja with Piyush Ranade, Tejaswini Pandit and Mukta Barve. She portrayed scandal victim Manaswini Desai (Manu). She has also played leading roles in Marathi plays.

In 2018, Oak made her short film debut with the film Quarter directed by Navjyot Bandiwadekar. The film was premiered at the 71st Cannes Film Festival in the Court Métrage (Short Film Corner) category and was later showcased at various International Film festivals. For her performance in the film, Oak won her first international award as Best Actress at the European Cinematography Awards 2018 and was nominated as Best International Actress at the Maverick Movie Awards 2018. Quarter was the first Indian short film to launch a poster and trailer at a public event attended by members of the Indian press and Indian film industry personalities. The film was digitally released worldwide on 10 April 2020.

Oak played the lead role in the second season of the Hindi serial Ladies Special on Sony Entertainment Television. She was a finalist in the popular singing contest Singing Star.

In the 2020s, Oak started working in films and web-series. In 2023, she starred in the films Jawan and The Vaccine War.

She starred in the web-series Perfect Family and 13th: Some Lessons Aren't Taught in Classrooms in 2025.

She next starred in Bharat Bhhagya Viddhaata, which released in June 2026. She stars alongside Kangana Ranaut, and Smita Tambe in the film.

== Public image ==
In 2026, Oak gained widespread attention on social media, where a video of her in a blue saree went viral, leading to her being called the "internet's latest crush" and "India's Sydney Sweeney". Oak, however, felt overwhelmed and uncomfortable, criticising internet users for circulating AI generated morphed images of her, which sexualized and objectified her, and sending her distasteful text messages, further advising them to consider the negative impact of the images.

== Personal life ==
Oak is the daughter of Marathi actor Girish Oak. She completed her degree in biotechnology from Thakur College of Science and Commerce Kandivali East, Mumbai. She joined a theatre workshop and started acting in advertisements.

Oak is married to Suhrud Godbole. She is the daughter-in-law of Marathi film actor, dialogue writer and film producer Shrirang Godbole.

== Filmography ==
Key
†	Denotes films that have not yet been released

Television

Year	Film	Role	Language	Notes
2009	CID	Sapna	Hindi	
2018	Ladies Special	Meghna Nikade	Hindi	
2019	Pandu	Mrs Sinha	Marathi	
2021	Cartel	Rama	Hindi	
2022	Nine to Five	Aashika	Marathi	
2022	Modern Love: Mumbai	Kriti	Hindi	
2025	13th: Some Lessons Aren't Taught in Classrooms	Mansi	Hindi	
2025	Perfect Family	Neeti	Hindi	
2026	Hello Bachhon	Alakh's sister	Hindi	

Films

Year	Film	Role	Language	Notes
2004	Manini	Shalimi	Marathi	
2007	Taare Zameen Par	Jabeen	Hindi	
2008	Man Pakharu Pakharu		Marathi	
2009	Goshta Choti Dongraevadhi	Vaidehi	Marathi	
2009	Gulmohar		Marathi	
2009	Chingi		Marathi	
2009	House Full	Neetu	Kannada	
2010	Lajja	Manaswini Desai (Manu)	Marathi	TV series
2010	Manini	Shalini	Marathi	
2010	Huppa Huiyya	Vasanti	Marathi	Nominated -MFK Award for Favourite Actress
2011	Adgula Madgula	Anuja	Marathi	
2011	Shor in the City	Sejal	Hindi	
2011	Cycle Kick	Shrishti	Hindi	
2013	Navra Maza Bhavra		Marathi	
2014	The Journey to Her Smile	Revati Deshmukh	English	
2015	Baji		Marathi	Guest
2015	2 Premi Premache		Marathi	
2017	Baaki Itihaas	Kanak Chakravarthy	Hindi	
2018	Moving Out		Marathi	Web series
2018	Mauli	Mauli's Mother	Marathi	
2020	Quarter	Ashwini Ranade	Marathi	Short film
2020	Goshta Eka Paithanichi	Sheela	Marathi	
2022	Qala	Sudha	Hindi	
2023	Jawan	Iskra	Hindi	
2023	The Vaccine War	Dr. Nivedita Gupta	Hindi	
2025	Inspector Zende	Vijaya Zende	Hindi	
2026	Bharat Bhhagya Viddhaata			
