= Project 9191 =

- Genre: Crime; Drama
- Written by: Charudutt Acharya; Subramanian S. Iyer
- Directed by: Subbu
- Starring: Jagat Rawat; Trishna Mukherjee; Abhishekh Khan; Jagat Rawat; Jaswant Dalal; Vaibhav Tatwawadi; Arun Nalawade
- Music by: Dhaval Tandon
- Country of origin: India
- Original language: Hindi
- No. of seasons: 1
- No. of episodes: 7

Production
- Producer: Indranil Chakraborty
- Cinematography: Chandrakant Yadav; Lucky Yadav
- Editor: Charu Takkar
- Running time: 33–45 minutes
- Production company: Studio NEXT

Original release
- Network: SonyLIV
- Release: 26 March 2021

Project 9191 is a Hindi-language streaming television series produced by Indranil Chakraborty and directed by Subbu. Its stars Satyajit Sharma, Abhishekh Khan, Jagat Rawat, Kappil Shah, Lekha Prajapati, Sandeep Kumaar, Satyen Chaturvedi, Vaibhav Tatwawadi, Trishna Mukherjee and others.

== Cast ==
- Satyajit Sharma as JCP Amitabh Sinha
- Trishna Mukherjee as Deepa Nagpal
- Jaswant Dalal as Sharad Kumar
- Vaibhav Tatwawadi as Pankaj Dhanawade
- Dadhey Pandey as Usman Dastagir
- Abhishekh Khan as Johnny
- Nidhi Dugar as Nisha
- Arun Nalawade as IB Chief Shashank Giri
- Jagat Rawat as Commissioner of Police Raghuveer Jhalan
- Ajay Jairam Patwari as SI Diwakar Pandit
- Abeer Meherish as Inspector Asif Sheikh (Crime Branch)
- Amit Verma as Inspector Neeraj Tripathi (Crime Branch)
- Amit Bhardwaj as Bilal Sayyed
- Harsh Singh as CBI officer SK Raina
- Sandeep Kumaar as Ashfaq Abbasi
- Shivani Rangole as Shruti Khetarpal
- Suhani Popli as Shivani
- Saarvie Omana as Mansi
- Sultan Warsi as Farooq (police informer)
- Satyen Chaturvedi as Haider Moinuddin
- Lekha Prajapati as Arfia Siddiqui
- Mihir Ahuja as Rishabh Chaudhary
- Afia Tayebali as Neha Dixit
- Ajay Raju as police Informer Abbas

== Production and release ==
The series was announced on 18 March 2021. Trailer of the series was released on the same day.

The series was released on 26 March 2021 on SonyLIV.

== Critical response ==
The series was reviewed by News18 India. Binged staff rated the series 5 out 10 and stated series direction is a drawback. IndiaWest stated that the series disappoints.
