= Jagat Rawat =

Indian Film and Television Actor

- Born: Jagat Rawat
- Education: Bhartendu Academy of Dramatic Arts & [[National School of Drama repertry company))
- Occupation: Actor
- Years active: 2004-Present
- Known for: ((Film commando))Kuch Rang Pyar Ke Aise Bhipushpa impossible ((criminal justice))

Jagat Rawat is an Indian film and television actor from a strong theatre background, including his six years in Bhartendu Academy of Dramatic Arts and National School of Drama repertory company, where he acted in many classic and contemporary plays. He is currently portraying Ashutosh Nanavati in Pushpa Impossible.

He has worked in films like Commando: A One Man Army, Ab Tak Chhappan 2, Manjhi – The Mountain Man and many more.

== Filmography ==
=== Films ===
Year	Title	Role	Ref (s)
2008	Hijack	Sajid	
2011	No One Killed Jessica	Dharam Saxena	
2011	Yeh Faasley	Caretaker	
2012	Raaz 3D	Asst. Main Exorcist	
2013	Aurangzeb	Bilal	
2013	Commando - A One Man Army	MP Friend	
2013	Chor Chor Super Chor	Amol	
2014	Mastram	Rajaram's uncle	
2015	Ab Tak Chhappan 2	Keshav	
2015	Manjhi - The Mountain Man	Shuklji	
2016	1920 London	Kaka	
2016	Happy Bhag Jayegi	Fakru	
2022	Laal Singh Chaddha	Father of School	
2022	Double XL	Mausaji	

=== Television ===
Year	Title	Role	Ref (s)
2010	Powder	Gangster Raja	
2010	Seven	Adhyaksh	
2010	Ganga Kii Dheej		
2011	Anhoniyon Ka Andhera	Unknown (cameo)	
2012	Hum Ne Li Hai...Shapath	Crazy criminal	
2013	CID	Unknown (cameo)	
2013	Gutur Gu 2	Jay Ahuja	
2014	Dharmakshetra	Shakuni	
2014-15	Nisha Aur Uske Cousins	Mohan Nemichand Gangwal	
2016-17	Kuch Rang Pyar Ke Aise Bhi	Bijoy Bose	
2018–2019	Roop - Mard Ka Naya Swaroop	Rupesh Patel/Mr. Patel	
2021	Kuch Rang Pyar Ke Aise - Nayi Kahani	Bijoy Bose	
2021	Project 9191	Raghuveer Jhalan	
2022-2023	Pushpa Impossible	Ashutosh Nanavati	
2024	Kuch Reet Jagat Ki Aisi Hai	Ishwar	
2026–present	Shayad Yahi Hai Pyaar	Vinod Arora	
