= Lajja (TV series) =

2010 Indian Marathi language TV series

- Genre: Drama
- Directed by: Jalindar Kumbhar
- Starring: See below
- Country of origin: India
- Original language: Marathi
- No. of episodes: 275

Production
- Producer: Smita Talwalkar
- Production locations: Mumbai, Maharashtra
- Camera setup: Multi-camera
- Running time: 22 minutes
- Production company: Indian Magic Eye Motion Pictures

Original release
- Network: Zee Marathi
- Release: 12 July 2010 – 28 May 2011

Lajja (transl. Shame) is an Indian Marathi language TV series which aired on Zee Marathi. It starred Girija Oak and Piyush Ranade in lead roles. It is produced by Smita Talwalkar and directed by Jalindar Kumbhar under the banner of Indian Magic Eye Motion Pictures. It premiered from 12 July 2010 by replacing Anubandh and ended on 28 May 2011 completing 275 episodes.

== Plot ==
It is the story of Manu, a happy go lucky girl from Alibaug. Manu who plans to move to Mumbai for her ailing mother’s treatment receives a rude shock when her best friend Diksha commits suicide. A visibly upset and shaken Manu shifts to Mumbai and starts living with her relatives. In Mumbai, she meets Mangesh and soon they become friends. But soon certain life changing situations arise.

== Cast ==
- Girija Oak as Manaswini
- Piyush Ranade as Aakash
- Tejaswini Pandit as Neeraja
- Neena Kulkarni as Vasumati
- Vinay Apte as Dushyant
- Mukta Barve as Meera
- Lokesh Gupte as Mangesh
- Sukanya Kulkarni
- Kishori Ambiye
- Vandana Waknis
- Rajan Tamhane
- Shalmali Tolye
