= Perfect Family (Indian TV series) =

- Genre: Comedy-drama
- Created by: Palak Bhambri
- Written by: Adhiraj Sharma Palak Bhambri
- Directed by: Sachin Pathak
- Starring: Gulshan Devaiah; Neha Dhupia; Manoj Pahwa; Seema Pahwa; Girija Oak Godbole; Kaveri Seth
- Country of origin: India
- Original language: Hindi
- No. of episodes: 8

Production
- Producers: Pankaj Tripathi; Ajay Rai; Mohit Chhabra
- Production company: JAR Pictures

Original release
- Network: YouTube
- Release: November 27, 2025

Perfect Family is a 2025 Indian Hindi-language dramedy web series produced by actor Pankaj Tripathi in his debut as a producer. Created by Palak Bhambri and directed by Sachin Pathak, the series premiered on the JAR Series YouTube channel on 27 November 2025. It stars Gulshan Devaiah, Neha Dhupia, Manoj Pahwa, Seema Pahwa, Girija Oak. The eight-episode show blends humor and drama while exploring family dynamics, emotional well-being, and the use of therapy to navigate conflicts.

== Cast ==
- Gulshan Devaiah as Vishnu Karkaria
- Neha Dhupia as Megha
- Manoj Pahwa as Somnath Karkaria
- Seema Pahwa as Kamla
- Girija Oak Godbole as Neeti Karkaria nee Dixit
- Kaveri Seth as Pooja Karkaria
- Hirva Trivedi as Daani
- Abhi Khajuria as Ashok
- Ronav Vaswani as Daksh
- Priyank Tatariya as Sumit Mangtani

== Premise ==
The series follows the Karkaria family, whose outwardly perfect life begins to unravel when their youngest daughter struggles at school. Confronted with emotional challenges and familial tensions, the family attends therapy together, leading to self-reflection, confrontations, and comedic situations. The show addresses themes of mental health, family relationships, and societal expectations through a balance of humor and drama.

== Production ==
Perfect Family marks Pankaj Tripathi’s debut as a producer, co-produced by Ajay Rai of JAR Pictures and Mohit Chhabra. The series was created by Palak Bhambri and directed by Sachin Pathak, produced specifically for YouTube with a structured pay model: the first two episodes were free, and the remaining six were available through a one-time payment.

== Reception ==
The Indian Express rated the series 3.5/5, calling it "beautifully relatable" and praising its introduction to therapy without becoming preachy. India Today praised the ensemble cast especially Manoj Pahwa and Seema Pahwa and noted the series "resists the glossy facade" of a typical family drama, portraying messy relationships and gradual emotional growth. Hindustan Times gave three stars, describing it as "a sincere look at therapy and trauma" but noting overuse of flashbacks and narrative muddiness. The Times of India noted that tighter editing could have improved the storytelling, but praised the cast for bringing emotional depth and believability. Scroll.in highlighted the show’s honesty in portraying family conflicts, calling it "full of home truths about family relationships." Firstpost rated it 2.5/5, praising performances by Manoj Pahwa and Gulshan Devaiah but describing the show as "innocuous and imperfect" and sometimes familiar in its depiction of family dynamics.
