= Piyush Trivedi =

Personal details
- Born: 13 September 1958 (age 68) Indore, Madhya Pradesh
- Spouse: Vandana Trivedi
- Children: 2 daughters, 1 son
- Education: Dr. Hari Singh Gour University
- Profession: Academic

Piyush Trivedi (born September 13, 1958) is an Indian academic. He is the founder and current head of the School of Pharmaceutical Sciences at Rajiv Gandhi Proudyogiki Vishwavidyalaya, also known as State Technological University of Madhya Pradesh, in Bhopal. Trivedi is also the former vice-chancellor of the school.

== Career ==
Trivedi began his teaching career at Holkar Science College in 1981. His tenure at RGPV began as the founder and head of the School of Pharmaceuticals in the year 2003. He was then appointed as the vice-chancellor of the school in July 2008.

During his 8-year stint as vice-chancellor he introduced the Chancellor's Scholarship Award, which is awarded to students with exceptional academic and extracurricular credentials. He also implemented the RGPV service portal for "E-Governance, transparency and convenience." Through the portal approximately 175,000 enrolled students are provided with unique identification. Other initiatives include the introduction of an electronic library, a startup fund for student entrepreneurs, and a scholarship for economically disadvantaged students.

The Government of Madhya Pradesh appointed Trivedi as director of M.P. Power Generating Co. Ltd. in the year 2009.

On 27 December 2012 Trivedi was re-appointed vice-chancellor. He would complete this second tenure as vice-chancellor in December 2016.
