= Saloni Gaur =

Indian comedian and mimic

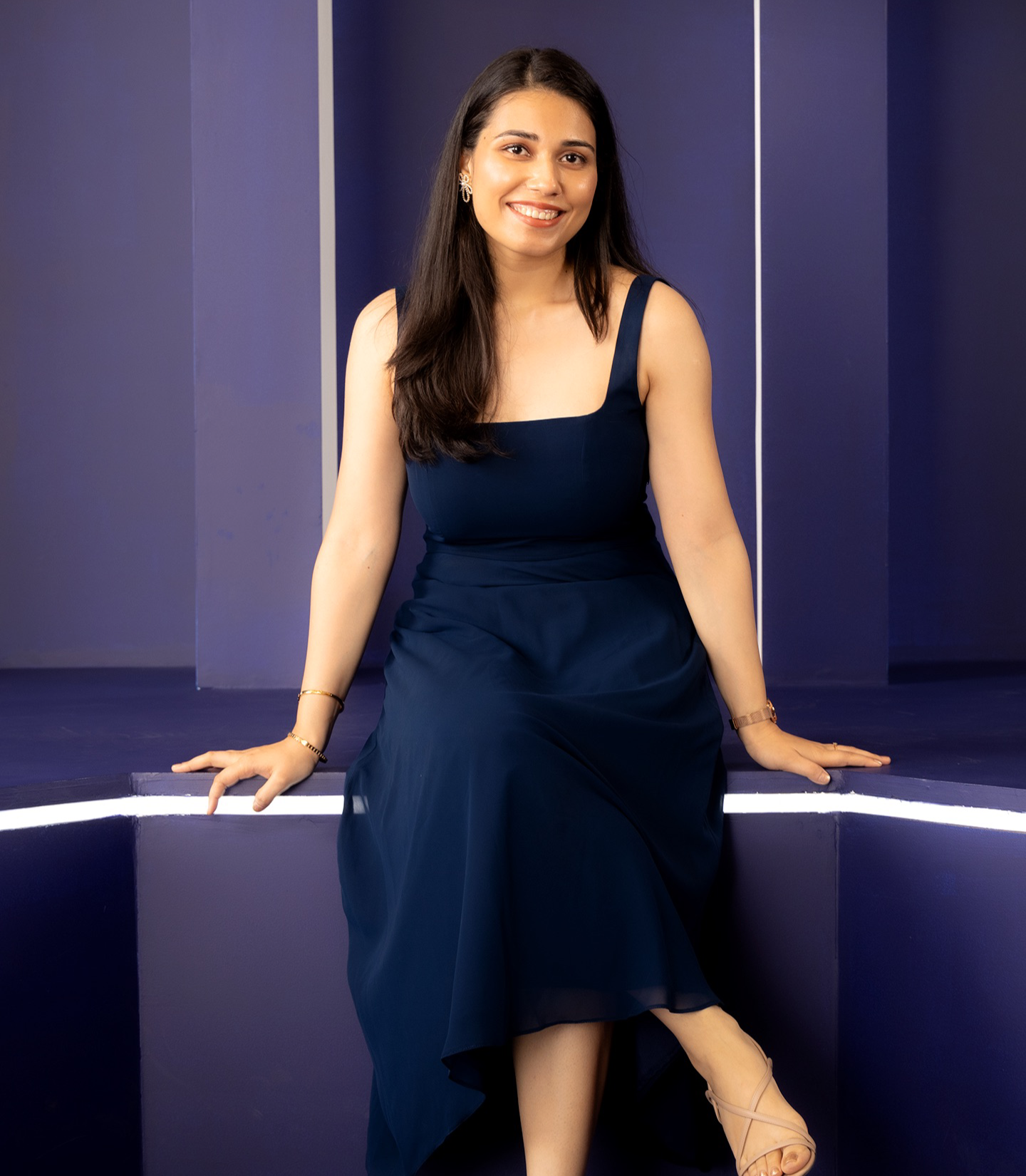
- Gaur in 2022
- Born: 12 December 1999 (age 26); Bulandshahr, Uttar Pradesh, India
- Other name: Nazma Aapi
- Education: Delhi University
- Occupations: Comedian, Mimic
- Spouse: Rajat Sain (m. 2023)

Saloni Gaur (born 12 December 1999), alternately known by her comic name Nazma Aapi, is a contemporary Indian comedian and impressionist. She addresses social issues through her comic videos.

== Biography ==
She completed an undergraduate degree from the Janki Devi Memorial College in political science and economics.

Saloni started her comic career by the character of "Pinky Dogra" and later used the characters of "Kusum Behenji" and "Asha Behenji". She created the "Nazma Aapi" character in 2018 to address contemporary social issues. She uses Instagram and Twitter as the platforms to reach out to people. She has produced videos on the Citizenship Amendment Act, pollution in Delhi and the Union Budget 2020.

In November 2020, Saloni landed her own show Uncommon Sense With Saloni on the OTT platform Sony Liv.

== Personal life ==
In October 2023, she married Rajat Sain, who is a journalist.

== Filmography ==
=== Television ===
Year	Title	Role
2020	Uncommon Sense With Saloni	Self

=== Web series ===
Year	Title	Role
2022	Campus Diaries	Priyanka
