= Asian American and Pacific Islander Policy Research Consortium =

Research organization focused on Asian American and Pacific Islander policy

The Asian American and Pacific Islander Policy Research Consortium (AAPIPRC) focuses on critical policy issues facing the Asian American and Pacific Islander communities. Conceived of as part of the White House Executive Order 13515 (2009) (Increasing Participation of Asian Americans and Pacific Islanders in Federal Programs) the consortium supports, promotes, and conducts applied social science and policy research. In addition, Professor Paul M. Ong proposed two courses of action for AAPIPRC, one which formalizes working relationships among university-based AAPI research institutions and the other which would include publishing the proceedings of the briefs to inform policy.

== Members ==
The consortium comprises four university-based research centers:

- University of California, Los Angeles's Asian American Studies Center
- University of Massachusetts, Boston's Institute for Asian American Studies
- City University of New York's Asian American/Asian Research Institute
- University of California's Asian American and Pacific Islanders Policy Multi-campus Research Program.

== Conferences and advocacy work ==
Since its creation, AAPIPRC has sponsored annual conferences focused on connecting national, state and local agencies to AAPI policy and research. Hosted by the National Education Association in Washington D.C., the 2012 conference focused on "Expanding the Asian American and Pacific Islander Voice in National Policy." The 2013 conference focused on the use of survey and other research methodology to inform AAPI policy.

In addition to the conferences, AAPIPRC issued press releases to the Pew Research Center and Governing Board of the Pew Research Center in response Pew Research Center's report "The Rise of Asian Americans" and sensationalist headlines of the report that caused concerns among the AAPI academic community due to its misrepresentations of AAPI success.
