= Piyush Ranade =

Indian television & film actor

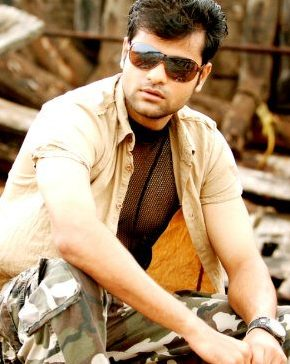
- Born: 28 March 1983 (age 43)
- Occupation: Actor
- Years active: 2005–present
- Spouse(s): Shalmalee Tolye (m. 2010; div. 2014) Mayuri Wagh (m. 2018, separated) Suruchi Adarkar (m. 2023)
- Website: PiyushRanade.blogspot.in

Piyush Ranade (born 28 March 1983) is a Marathi film and television actor. He appeared in Zee Marathi TV series Ekach Hya Janmi Janu, Lajja and Asmita, also in Star Plus's Burey Bhi Hum Bhale Bhi Hum as Kaivalya.

== Career ==
Piyush Ranade's first major Hindi play was Mahanirvan by Satish Alekar when he was still in college. He later performed in Oye Band Baj Gaya! and Sakna Re To Sasu Nahi by National Centre for the Performing Arts (India). Piyush got his first Marathi television show Kata Rute Kunala. His first major Hindi television show was Burey Bhi Hum Bhale Bhi Hum on Star Plus in which he played Kaivalya (Mansukh's elder son).

His first Marathi television show as lead star was Zee Marathi's Lajja along with Girija Oak, Tejaswini Pandit and Mukta Barve. In this show, he portrayed character of a young and dynamic CID Inspector Akash Ketkar. His second Marathi television show as lead was Zee Marathi's Ekach Hya Janmi Janu opposite to Tejaswini Pandit. In Ekach Hya Janmi Janu, he portrayed character named Shrikant, who found his lost wife's reflection in a disabled girl Anjali.

He was also seen in other Marathi, Hindi as well as Gujrati television shows. Pawan in Gunda Purush Dev, Madhu Ithe An Chandra Tithe, Man Udhan Varyache, Manu in Papad Pol, Jasuben Jayantilaal Joshi Ki Joint Family,

== Filmography ==
Year	Film	Role	Language	Notes
2021	Tribhanga	Vinayak	Hindi, English, Marathi	By Director Renuka Shahane
2023	Baipan Bhaari Deva	Ashutosh Deshmukh	Marathi	By Director Kedar Shinde

=== Television ===
Year	Title	Role	Language	Notes
2009	Burey Bhi Hum Bhale Bhi Hum	Kaivalya	Hindi	Television debut
2010-2011	Lajja	Aakash Desai	Marathi	Lead debut
2011	Ekach Hya Janmi Janu	Shrikant Inamdar	Marathi	
2014-2016	Asmita	Abhiman Saranjame	Marathi	
2022	Pinkicha Vijay Aso!	Sameer	Marathi	
2023-2024	Kavyanjali – Sakhi Savali	Vishwajeet	Marathi	
