= Kacho Papad Pako Papad =

Gujarati romantic-comedy web series

- Genre: Romance; Drama; Comedy
- Created by: Pep Figueiredo
- Written by: Hasmukh Gandhi
- Directed by: Chetan Sharma
- Starring: Bhakti Rathod; Sagar Dariyai; Rupa Divatia; Pratap Sachdeo
- Composer: Sukumar Dutta
- Country of origin: India
- Original language: Gujarati
- No. of seasons: 1
- No. of episodes: 12

Production
- Producer: Hasmukh Gandhi
- Production company: M2 Entertainment

Original release
- Network: SonyLIV
- Release: 19 May 2017

Kacho Papad Pako Papad is a 2017 Indian streaming television series created for SonyLIV, the digital platform of Sony Pictures Networks India. It was directed by Chetan Sharma and written and produced by Hamsukh Gandhi under the banner of M2 Entertainment. It was the first Gujarati romantic comedy drama, released on SonyLIV on 19 May 2017. It starred Bhakti Rathod, Sagar Dariyai, Rupa Divatia, and Pratap Sachdeo in the main roles. The series chronicles the dilemmas of an average, middle class joint Gujarati family. The series, featured as Crunchy Tales, is one of Sony's 82 greatest shows on Sony Pictures 2019 coffee table book.

== Plot ==
Kacho Papad Pako Papad is centered on the life of the Maniyar family who over complicate all their daily problems. It all starts when their son Vipul (Sagar Dariyai) introduces the family to a girl (Bhakti Rathod) who is older than him. But, trouble mounts when the girl who is several years younger, expresses her love for their son and intends to marry him.

== Music video ==
In May 2017 SonyLIV announced a romantic music video titled Aadat Che Tu for this series. It was released on 5 June 2017. The lyrics were written by Bharat Kumar Joshi and composed by music director Sukumar Dutta.

== Episodes ==
=== Season 1 ===
Series	Episodes	Originally released
1	10	17 September 2017

No. overall	No. in season	Title	Directed by	Written by	Original release date
1	1	"Vipul ni Laxmi aavi rahi chhe..."	Chetan Sharma	Hamsukh Gandhi	17 September 2017
2	2	"Premma Padyo Chhe Ke Vahem Ma?"	Chetan Sharma	Hamsukh Gandhi	17 September 2017
3	3	"Yeh shaadi nahi ho saktiiiii!"	Chetan Sharma	Hamsukh Gandhi	17 September 2017
4	4	"Sanjanano Saat Varshno Problem"	Chetan Sharma	Hamsukh Gandhi	17 September 2017
5	5	"Sexy kidni love story"	Chetan Sharma	Hamsukh Gandhi	17 September 2017
6	6	"Aa Seduce Karavu Etale Shu?"	Chetan Sharma	Hamsukh Gandhi	17 September 2017
7	7	"Prachi no love attack"	Chetan Sharma	Hamsukh Gandhi	17 September 2017
8	8	"Prachi J Laxmi chhe!"	Chetan Sharma	Hamsukh Gandhi	17 September 2017
9	9	"Sanjananu Secret"	Chetan Sharma	Hamsukh Gandhi	17 September 2017
10	10	"Sanjana ane Prachini Final Match"	Chetan Sharma	Hamsukh Gandhi	17 September 2017
