= Financial thriller =

Subgenre of thriller fiction

Financial thrillers are a subgenre of thriller fiction in which the financial system and economy play a major role.

== History ==
The novel The Financier (1912) by Theodore Dreiser displays elements of a financial thriller and is an early example of the genre. Paul Erdman helped popularize the modern financial thriller, with The Billion Dollar Sure Thing (1973). The former president of a Swiss bank, he penned the novel while in jail awaiting trial on fraud charges related to speculating in the cocoa market.

== Overview ==
In many cases the protagonist of a financial thriller is a financial professional such as Christian Slater’s character in the 2005 film The Deal, or John Kent in Martin Bodenham's 2011 novel, The Geneva Connection. Often, the plot centers on a financial crime. It may be a crime that merely enriches a small number of individuals as with The Millionaires by Brad Meltzer, or one that threatens the entire financial system, as in Tom Clancy’s Debt of Honor (1994). In "Flash Crash," by Denison Hatch the financial crime involves an algorithmic programmer ("quant") who is blackmailed into writing a program that will crash the international gold markets.

Financial thrillers are often used as morality plays to illustrate the evils of greed, as in Black Money (1995), by Michael M. Thomas.

During the 2008 financial crisis, some financial thrillers took on educational roles. The 2011 HBO TV-movie Too Big to Fail is, in the words of Jesse Eisinger, "extraordinarily revealing about the financial crisis" but not always in a helpful way. For example, Eisinger says, "The government gave the banks money but didn't get voting rights and didn't prevent the banks from using the money to pay dividends or bonuses. They wrote what was essentially a blank check...It's left to the hapless PR woman...to wonder why, if the government is saving these institutions, it couldn't impose any limits on how the money be used." Another film in this genre is J. C. Chandor's Academy Award-nominated Margin Call, also from 2011.

In the 2010s, The Big Short was adapted from a non-fiction book into a movie, and it is also a prominent financial thriller.

== List of financial thrillers ==
- Wall Street (1987)
- Rogue Trader (1999)
- Boiler Room (2000)
- The Deal (2005)
- Margin Call (2011)
- The Big Short (2015)
- Money Monster (2016)
- Industry (2020-)
- Fair Play (2023)

== See also ==
- Hyperlink film
- Social thriller
