= SonyLIV =

Indian video streaming service

Sony LIV
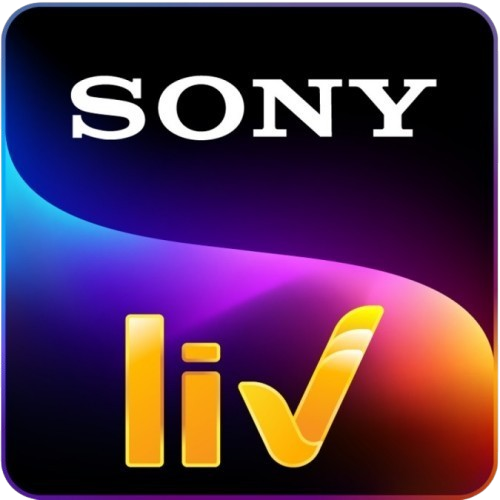
- Company type: Streaming
- Website type: OTT platform
- Available in: Hindi; Bengali; English; Tamil; Telugu; Malayalam; Kannada; Marathi; Punjabi
- Headquarters: Mumbai, India
- Country of origin: India
- Area served: Canada, Europe, Middle East, Indo-Pacific, South Asia, and United States
- Owner: Sony
- Industry: Entertainment; mass media
- Products: Video on demand; digital distribution
- Services: Film production; film distribution; television production
- Parent: Sony Pictures Networks
- Website: www.sonyliv.com
- Commercial: Yes
- Registration: Required (Note: Optional in India, but monthly subscription is required to access additional content.)
- Users: ▲33.3 million (paid; May 2023)
- Launched: 22 January 2013; 13 years ago
- Current status: Active

Sony LIV is an Indian subscription video on-demand over-the-top streaming television service owned by Sony Pictures Networks. Sony LIV was introduced in 2013 as the first OTT service in India. As a streaming service, it provides live sports, original titles, other content titles from its own networks and content titles in India licensed from third-parties such as JioHotstar, Netflix among others. The Sony LIV content library includes films, TV shows and series, and sports.

== History ==
Sony LIV was launched on 23 January 2013.

=== LIV Sports ===
LIV Sports was launched on 1 June 2014 by Culver Max Entertainment (as a new sports streaming service exclusively for sports properties). LIV Sports was the official mobile and internet broadcaster for the 2014 FIFA World Cup starting 12 June 2014. LIV Sports aired both live and video-on-demand match content with statistics and analysis.

=== Sony LIV first revamp (2018) ===
Sony LIV logo from 2016 to 2020

Sony LIV underwent its first revamp and started to stream live television channels. Since then, Sony LIV has added many shows and movies to its portfolio. On 1 November 2018, Sony LIV and Lionsgate entered a multi-year content deal.

=== Sony LIV second revamp (2020) ===
Sony LIV revamped its content and interface in May 2020 using AWS Cloud.

Sony LIV was launched as a streaming service in the United States on Sling TV, streaming all the shows available in India on the app.

On 15 January 2021, WWE Network was launched in India through Sony LIV.

Sony LIV was launched in Canada on 14 October 2021. It was launched in Australia, New Zealand, and Singapore on 25 February 2021. On 12 June 2021, as part of Europe Phase-1, Sony LIV was launched in France, Germany, Netherlands, Norway, Spain, Switzerland, and the UK (9 April 2021). On 1 October 2021, as part of Europe Phase-2, Sony LIV was launched in Austria, Belgium, Denmark, Finland, Greece, Ireland, Italy, Poland, Portugal, and Sweden.

== Content ==
=== Current broadcasting rights ===
- 2022 Asian Games (2023)
- US Open (2022–24)
- Indian Super League (2026-27)

=== Overview ===
Sony LIV's core library consists of 18+ years of content from Culver Max Entertainment's channels including Sony TV, Sony SAB, Sony Aath and Sony Marathi; and more than 700+ movies, which means a total of 40,000+ hours of television show coverage in Hindi and English.

=== History ===
Varieties of anime originals from Animax were available on Sony LIV to stream. After shutting down a linear TV channel on 18 April 2017, Animax was made available exclusively as a digital streaming channel in India from 7 July 2017 to 7 May 2020.

Sony LIV also streamed cricket matches played by Pakistan.

Beginning with the 2022 US Open, Sony Pictures Networks India will have the exclusive live television and digital rights to the US Open in India through 2024. As of August 2023, US Open would livestream on Sony LIV.

SonyLIV forayed into original music producing music for the Sony Pictures blockbuster Passengers (2016 film) starring Jennifer Lawrence and Chris Pratt sung by Shirley Setia, Jubin Nautiyal and Raftaar, composed by Sukumar Dutta.

=== Sony LIV Originals ===
Sony LIV has streamed a number of original streaming television series. The world's first-ever original was a Gujarati web series titled Kacho Papad Pako Papad and it is streaming since 2017.

Sony LIV underwent multiple revamps including a revamp in its appearance in June 2020. Since then, Sony LIV provides their original shows in 5–7 languages.

=== Genres ===
Sony LIV features content in the following key genres: comedy, crime, drama, horror and action.

== Viewership ==
As of August 2015, Sony LIV had reached about 25 million views on a monthly basis.

== Sony LIV security flaw ==
On 20 December 2019, Bengaluru-based security researcher Ehraz Ahmed discovered a security flaw in the Sony LIV app, that allowed to fetch sensitive user information such as profile picture, email address, date of birth, name and phone number of its registered users.

== See also ==
- Sony Pictures Networks
- ZEE5
- Crunchyroll
- Funimation
- Wakanim
- VRV
- Anime on Demand
- Crackle
- Hooq
- Quizzer of the Year
