= Inkollu =

Inkollu Inkina kolanu
- Town
- Interactive map of Inkollu
- Location in Andhra Pradesh, India
- Coordinates: 15.83°N 80.2°E
- Country: India
- State: Andhra Pradesh
- District: Bapatla
- Mandal: Inkollu

Population (2011)
  - Total: 50,000

Telugu
  - Official: Telugu
- Time zone: UTC+5:30 (IST)
- Postal Index Number: 523167
- Telephone code: +91–8594
- Vehicle registration: AP 27

Inkollu is a town in the Bapatla district of the Indian state of Andhra Pradesh. It serves as the administrative centre of Inkollu mandal which is part of the Chirala revenue division.

== Etymology ==
Inkollu was previously known as "Inkina Kolanu", which is believed to mean "sinking of ponds" in Telugu. However, there is no conclusive literary evidence to support this interpretation.

== Geography ==
Inkollu is situated in Inkollu Mandal and serves as its sub-district headquarters. According to 2009 statistics, Inkollu is classified as a major Gram Panchayat. It is located approximately 45 kilometers from its district headquarters in Bapatla and approximately 100 kilometers from the state capital, Amaravati. Nearby villages include Koniki (4.8 kilometers away), Sudivaripalem (8.2 kilometers away), Nagandla (8.5 kilometers away), Idupulapadu (9.1 kilometers away), and Duddukuru.

Inkollu Cheruvu (also known as Nagula Cheruvu) is a large pond situated in the northwest quadrant of the town.

== Climate ==
The town has a tropical climate, with an average temperature of 28.5 °C (83.3 °F). The area experiences hot and humid summers and cool winters due to its proximity to the Bay of Bengal. It receives both the southwest and northeast monsoons. The precipitation rate is high, with an annual rainfall of about 200 mm (7.9 in).

== Demographics ==
According to the 2011 Census of India, the population was 17,581, living in approximately 4,935 houses. The total area is 3,365 hectares. The villages with population as of 2011 in Inkollu mandal are given below.

Villages
Village	Population
Duddukur	3,013
Ganga Varam	2,949
Idupulapadu	5,638
Inkollu	17,581
Koniki	2,812
Nagandla	4,126
Pavulur	5,652
Pusapadu	5,815
Bhimavaram	1,960

== Economy ==
Business is one of the main occupations of the people in Inkollu, with many residents also depending on farming. Cultivation is another major occupation in the town. The NSL textile mill employs around 5,000 people, and most residents depend on its business. The town also has several cold storage facilities, three cinema halls, all major banks and several hospitals including GVK Nursing home famous across districts for eye care.

== Temples ==
The Pavulur Anjenayaswamy Temple is very famous and is located near the border of the rural village Pavulur, about 3 kilometres (1.9 mi) from Inkollu. The town also has several other old temples, including:

- Chenna Kesava Swami Temple (Vishnalayam)
- Sivalayam
- Veerabhadra Swami Temple
- Padmala Ankamma Temple
- Satya Sai Baba Temple
- Shirdi Sai Baba Temple

== Transport ==
The main mode of transport in Inkollu is road transport, with most people preferring APSRTC buses. Towns within 40 kilometers of Inkollu include Ongole, Chirala, Addanki, Parchur, and Martur. The nearest railway stations are Vetapalem (10 kilometers away), Chirala (23 kilometers away), and Ongole (45 kilometers away).

Airports
Airport	Distance from city centre (km)
Hyderabad International Airport	320
Chennai International Airport	340
Tirupati Airport	280
Vijayawada Airport	110

Railway stations
Station	Distance (km)
Vetapalem	12.4
Chinnaganjam	14.5
Chirala	17.4
Stuartpuram	23.7

== Education ==
Primary and secondary school education in Inkollu is provided by the government or private institutions. The languages used in schools are English and Telugu. Schools in Inkollu include:

- Government Elementary School
- NR&VSR Girls High School
- Nivedita English Medium School
- MRR Public School
- Adarsa Public School
- Gowthami Public school
- Universal Techno School
- Vikas Public School
- JVP School
- Adrasa High school
- Zilla Parishad High school
- Bhashyam High school
- Sai Rama School
- Aakridge High School
- Dr DVR’s SAINIK SCHOOL

=== Colleges ===
- DCRM Degree, PG & MBA college
- DCRM Pharmacy college
- DNM Junior college
- Surya Intermediate College
- Maruthi ITI College
