= Keerthivaripalem =

Village in Andhra Pradesh, India

Keerthivaripalem is a small village in Chirala Mandal in Bapatla District in Andhra Pradesh state, India. Chirala, Karamchedu, Bapatla, Vetapalem, are the nearby towns to Keerthivaripalem. Keerthivaripalem is reachable by Ipurupalem railway station, Ipurupalem Halt railway station, Stuartpuram railway station, Chirala railway station. Its main Village Panchayat is Vodarevu Panchayat.
