= Kopperapalem =

- Village
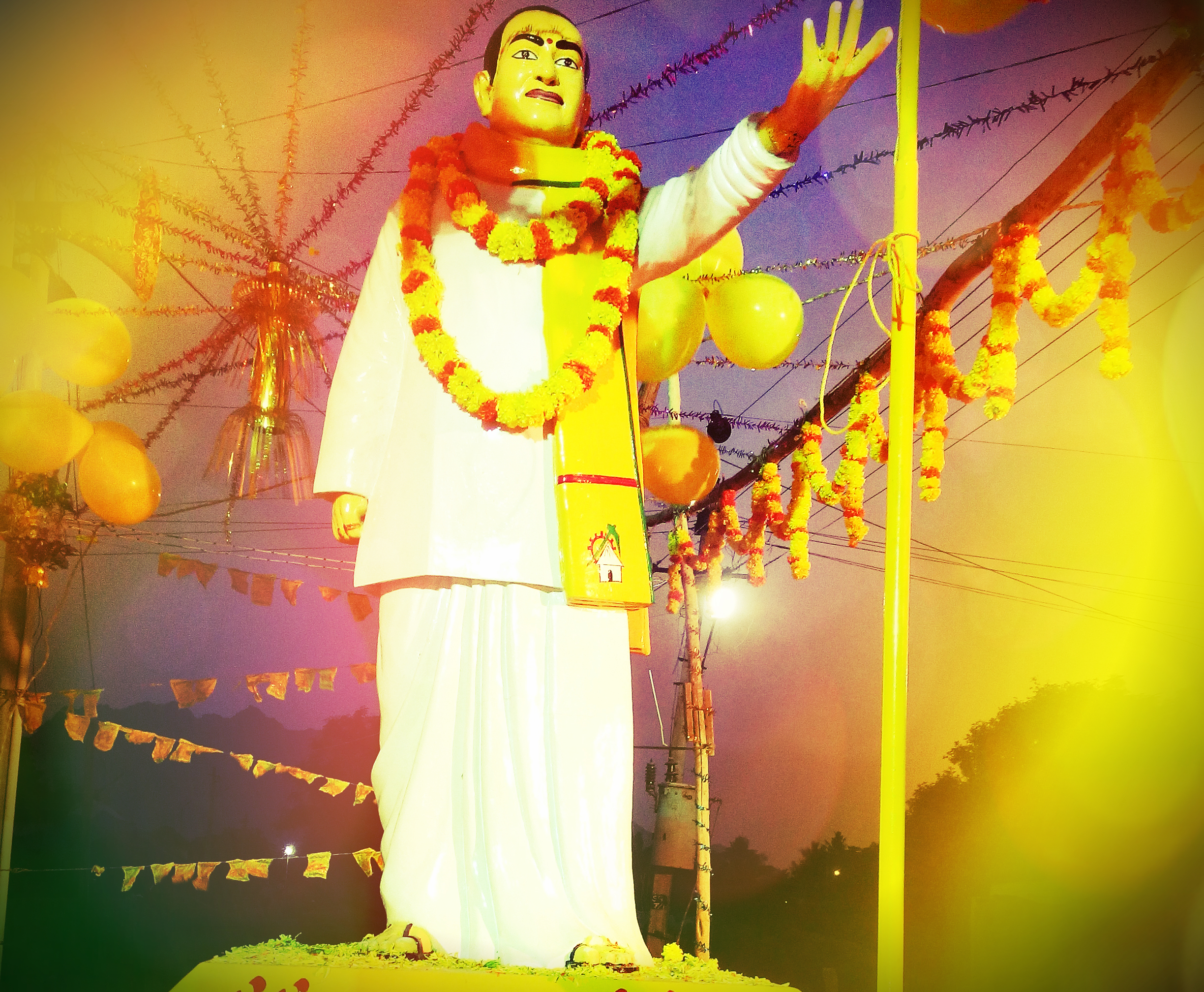
- N. T. Rama Rao statue in Kopperapalem village
- Interactive map of Kopperapalem
- Location in Andhra Pradesh, India
- Coordinates: 16°04′00.5″N 80°00′46.4″E
- Country: India
- State: Andhra Pradesh
- District: Bapatla District
- Mandal: Ballikurava

Government
  - Leading Party: Telugu Desam Party

Population
  - Total: 2,306

Languages
  - Official: Telugu
- Time zone: UTC+5:30 (IST)
- PIN: 523302
- Nearest city: Narsaraopet
- Lok Sabha Constituency: Bapatla

Kopperapalem village is located in Ballikurava mandal of Bapatla district, Andhra Pradesh, India. Its PIN code is 523302.

== Geography ==
Kopperapalem is located on 16.066800°N 80.012901°E Kopperapalem is 74 kilometres from the capital city Amaravathi village, Guntur district

== Politics ==
Kopperapalem belongs to Addanki assembly constituency.

== Near by places ==
Nearest Towns from Kopperapalem are Santhamaguluru(9 kilometres (5.6 mi)), Ballikurava(10 kilometres (6.2 mi)). Nearest railway station is at Narasaraopet - 27 kilometres (17 mi)

== Population ==
The total population of Kopperapalem is 2306. Males are 1,151 and females are 1,155 living in 543 Houses. The total area of Kopperapalem is 800 Hectares. In Kopperapalem, Telugu is the local language.

== Temples & Festivals ==
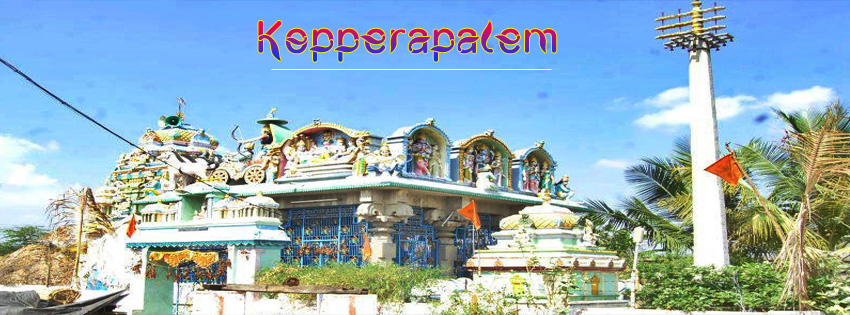
Famous Temple "Ramalayam"

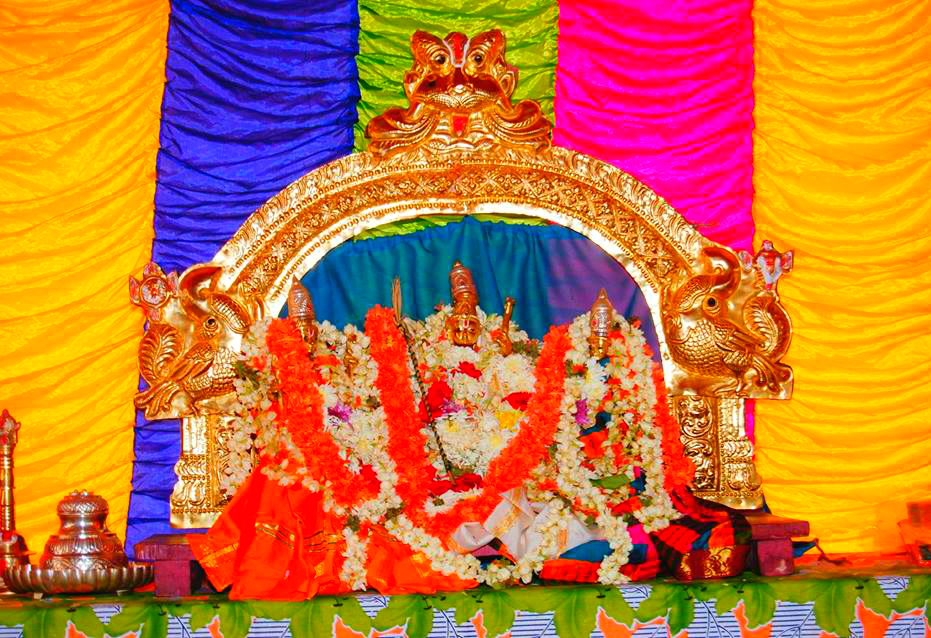
Sriramanavami Celebrations in Kopperapalem Village

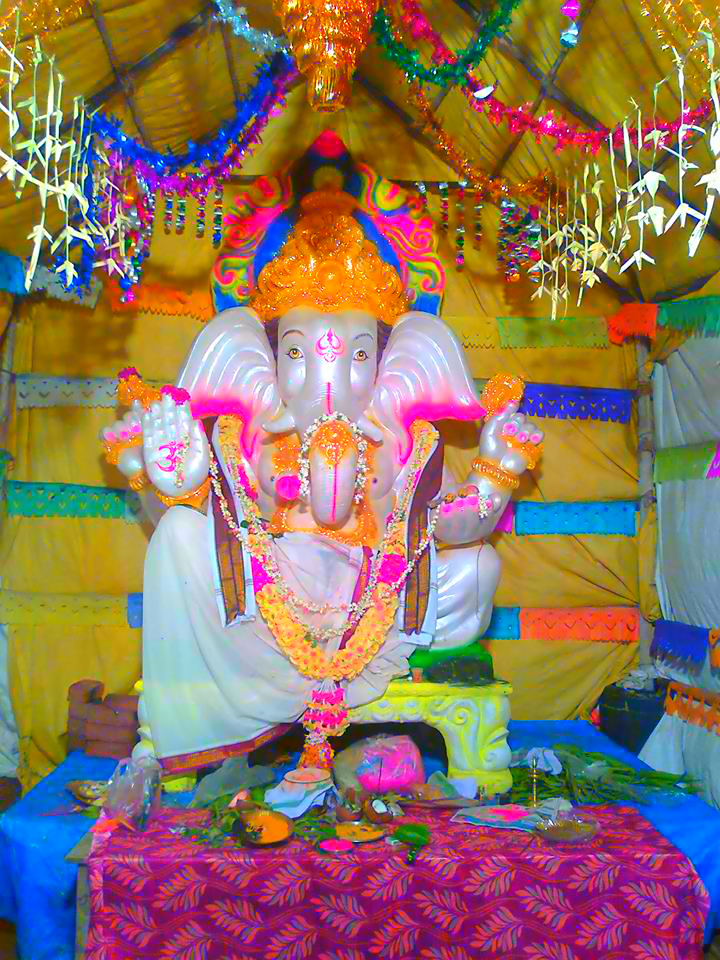
Vinayaka Chaviti Celebrations

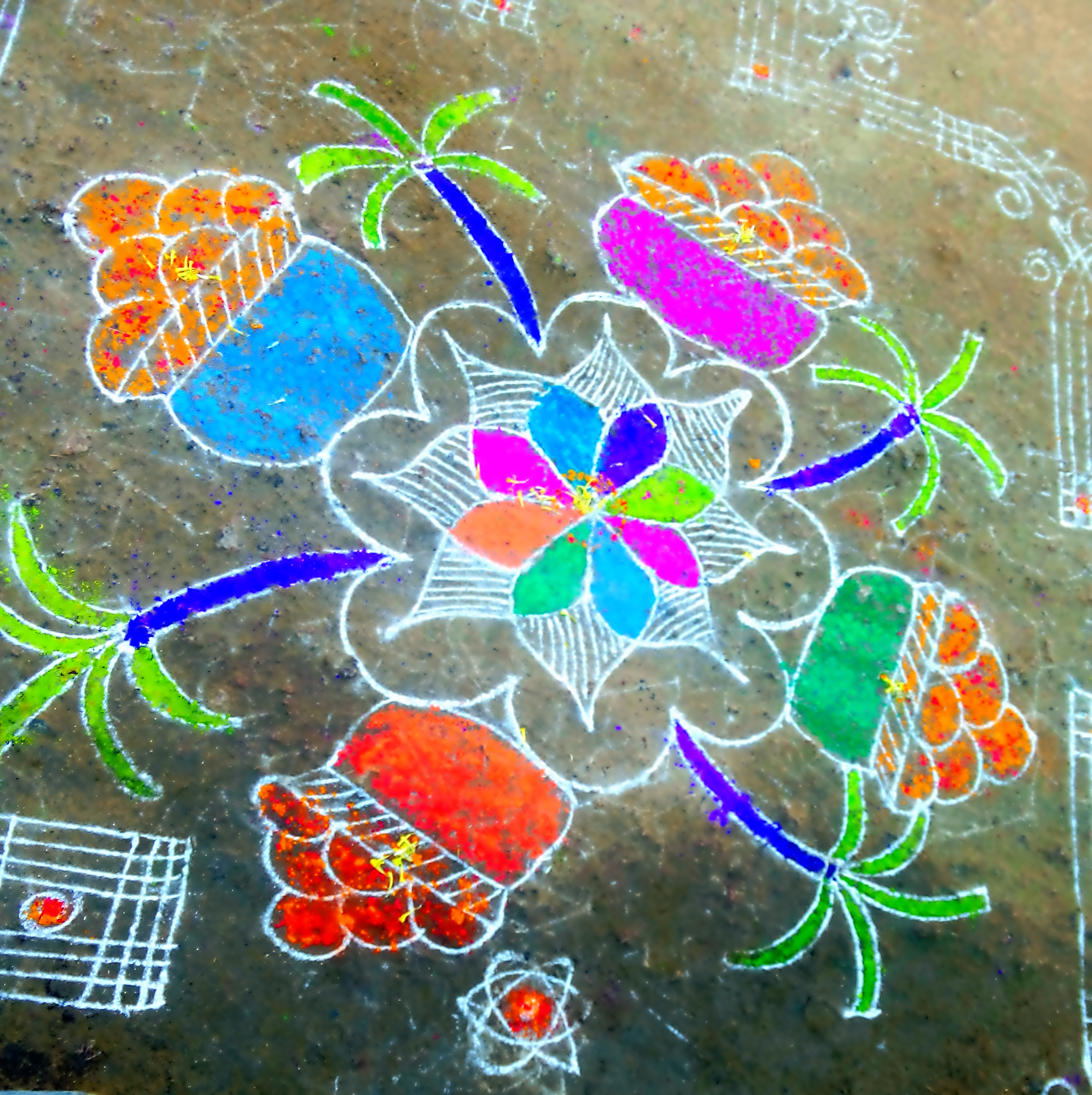
Sankranthi Special Rangoli

In Kopperapalem village, Ramalayam Temple is the famous temple in surrounding areas. Also there is Hanuman Temple and Lord Ganesh Temple in this Village.

== Education ==
There is Mandal Parishat Government School in this village. Zilla parishat High School is located in Ballikurava.

== Agriculture ==
Various crops grown in this village are listed below.

Crops	Vegetables	Leaves	Fruits
Rice (వరి పంట); Cotton (పత్తి); Sorghum (జొన్నలు); Pillipesara (పిల్లి పెసర); Greengram (పెసలు); Bazra (సజ్జలు); Maize (మొక్క జొన్న); Red Gram (కందిపప్పు); Subabulu (శుబాబులు); Sesame (నూగులు)	Tomato (టమోటా); Green Chilly (పచ్చిమిర్చి); Cucumber (దోసకాయ); Brinjal (వంకాయ); Drumsticks(మునగకాయ); Onions (ఉల్లిపాయలు); Ladies Finger (బెండకాయ)	Sorrel (గోంగూర); Amaranth (తోటకూర); Spinach (పాలకూర)	Banana (అరటికాయ); Lemon (నిమ్మకాయ); Watermelon (పుచ్చకాయ)

== Sports ==
Cricket is the most popular game played here and also it is the most followed game than any other game.
