= K. Rajupalem, Prakasam district =

K. Rajupalem
- Village
- Interactive map of K. Rajupalem
- Location in Andhra Pradesh, India
- Coordinates: 16.0074°N 80.09434°E
- Country: India
- State: Andhra Pradesh
- District: Prakasam
- Mandal: Ballikurava

Government
  - Type: State Government
  - Body: TDP

Area
  - Total: 6 km^{2} (2.3 sq mi)
- Elevation: Meters above sea level: 75 m (246 ft)

Population (2011 Census)
  - Total: 5,371
  - Density: 900/km^{2} (2,300/sq mi)

Telugu
  - Official: Telugu
- Time zone: UTC+5:30 (IST)
- Postal code: 523301
- Vehicle registration: AP27

K. Rajupalem is a village in Ballikurava mandal, Prakasam district of Andhra Pradesh in India.

== Geography ==
The villages shares a street border with Rajupalem village, which is part of Martur mandal of Bapatla district. It is located 63 km to the north from the district headquarters Ongole.

== Demographics ==
Around 1,440 families reside in this composite village consisting of K.Rajupalem and Rajupalem. As per constitution of India and Panchyati Raaj Act, K. Rajupalem village is administered by the Sarpanch Gadde MuralidharaRao elected for the five years term. As per the Census India 2011, Rajupalem village ( Sum of the both for K. Rajupalem, Rajupalem ) had a population of 5,371, of whom 2,690 were males and 2,681 were females. The population of children between age 0-6 was 554 which is 10.31% of total population.

The female sex ratio of Rajupalem village is around 997 per 1000 male, compared with the average of Andhra Pradesh state which is 993. The literacy rate of K. Rajupalem village is 53.88% out of whom 62.38% males are literate and 45.36% females are literate. There are 22.47% Scheduled Caste (SC) and 3% Scheduled Tribe (ST) of total population in Rajupalem village.

Population facts

| Particulars | Stats |
|---|---|
| Number of households | 1,440 |
| Population | 5,371 |
| Male population | 2,690 (50.08%) |
| Female population | 2,681 (49.92%) |
| Children population | 554 |
| Sex ratio | 997 w/m |
| Literacy | 53.88% |
| Male literacy | 62.38% |
| Female literacy | 45.36% |
| Scheduled Tribes (ST) % | 3% |
| Scheduled Caste (SC) % | 22.47% |
| Non-working people | 1622 |
| Non-working men | 753 |
| Non-working women | 869 |

== Climate ==
The village experiences tropical climate with the average annual temperatures records at 28.4 °C (83.1 °F). Hot summers and cool winters are observed due to its proximity to the coast of the Bay of Bengal. It receives both Southwest monsoon and Northeast monsoon. It is most affected by the cyclonic storms that occur on the east coast.

Climate data for Rajupalem Village
| Month | Jan | Feb | Mar | Apr | May | Jun | Jul | Aug | Sep | Oct | Nov | Dec | Year |
|---|---|---|---|---|---|---|---|---|---|---|---|---|---|
| Mean daily maximum °C (°F) | 29.8 (85.6) | 32.2 (90.0) | 35.7 (96.3) | 38.8 (101.8) | 39.3 (102.7) | 37.5 (99.5) | 33.3 (91.9) | 36.9 (98.4) | 34.8 (94.6) | 32.7 (90.9) | 30.3 (86.5) | 29.2 (84.6) | 34.2 (93.6) |
| Daily mean °C (°F) | 25.4 (77.7) | 26.2 (79.2) | 28.7 (83.7) | 32.4 (90.3) | 35.6 (96.1) | 35.6 (96.1) | 31.5 (88.7) | 29.2 (84.6) | 29 (84) | 28 (82) | 25.7 (78.3) | 24.1 (75.4) | 29.3 (84.7) |
| Mean daily minimum °C (°F) | 19.1 (66.4) | 20.6 (69.1) | 22.8 (73.0) | 25.8 (78.4) | 28 (82) | 27.7 (81.9) | 25.7 (78.3) | 25.5 (77.9) | 25.3 (77.5) | 24.2 (75.6) | 21.1 (70.0) | 19 (66) | 23.7 (74.7) |
| Average precipitation mm (inches) | 1 (0.0) | 4 (0.2) | 6 (0.2) | 14 (0.6) | 56 (2.2) | 115 (4.5) | 171 (6.7) | 161 (6.3) | 151 (5.9) | 159 (6.3) | 58 (2.3) | 10 (0.4) | 906 (35.6) |
