= Pedaprolu =

- Village
- Interactive map of Pedaprolu
- Location in Andhra Pradesh, India Pedaprolu (India)
- Coordinates: 16.0867°N 80.9133°E
- Country: India
- State: Andhra Pradesh
- District: Krishna

Area
  - Total: 9.62 km^{2} (3.71 sq mi)

Population (2011)
  - Total: 3,769
  - Density: 392/km^{2} (1,010/sq mi)

Languages
  - Official: Telugu
- Time zone: UTC+5:30 (IST)
- PIN: 521125
- Telephone code: 08671
- Vehicle registration: AP16
- Nearest city: Machilipatnam
- Lok Sabha constituency: Machilipatnam
- Vidhan Sabha constituency: Avanigadda

Pedaprolu is a village in Krishna district of the Indian state of Andhra Pradesh. It is located in Mopidevi mandal of Machilipatnam revenue division. It is a part of Andhra Pradesh Capital Region.

== Transportation ==
APSRTC Runs buses to Avanigadda, Ghantasala, Mopidevi, Challapalli, Kuchipudi, Movva, Gudivada, Pamarru, Machilipatnam through Pedaprolu village.

NH216, a main and major spur road of National Highway 16 (India) connects Ongole and kathipudi, passes through this village.

=== Nearest Railway stations ===
Machilipatnam railway station (MTM), Repalle railway station (RAL), Vijayawada Junction railway station (BZA), Gudivada Junction railway station (GDV) are the nearest railway stations to this Pedaprolu village.

== See also ==
- Villages in Mopidevi mandal
