= Perali =

- Village
- Interactive map of Perali
- Location in Andhra Pradesh, India
- Coordinates: 15.886°N 80.547°E
- Country: India
- State: Andhra Pradesh
- District: Bapatla
- Mandal: Karlapalem

Government
  - Type: Panchayati raj
  - Body: Perali gram panchayat

Area
  - Total: 2,640 ha (6,500 acres)

Population (2011)
  - Total: 11,035
  - Density: 418/km^{2} (1,080/sq mi)

Languages
  - Official: Telugu
- Time zone: UTC+5:30 (IST)
- Area code: +91–
- Vehicle registration: AP

Perali is a village in Bapatla district of the Indian state of Andhra Pradesh. It is located in Karlapalem mandal of Tenali revenue division.

== Geography ==
Perali is situated to the north of Nizampatnam Reserved Forest, Bay of Bengal and to the south of the mandal headquarters, Karlapalem, at 15.886°N 80.547°E. It is spread over an area of 2,640 ha (6,500 acres).

== Governance ==
Perali gram panchayat is the local self-government of the village. It is divided into wards and each ward is represented by a ward member.

== Education ==
As per the school information report for the academic year 2018–19, the village has 14 schools. These include 4 private and 10 Zilla/Mandal Parishad schools.
