= Chirala mandal =

- Mandal
- Interactive map of Chirala mandal
- Location in Andhra Pradesh, India
- Coordinates: 15.8246°N 80.3521°E
- Country: India
- State: Andhra Pradesh
- District: Bapatla
- Headquarters: Chirala

Languages
  - Official: Telugu
- Time zone: UTC+5:30 (IST)

Chirala mandal is one of the 25 mandals in Bapatla district of the Indian state of Andhra Pradesh. It is administered under Chirala revenue division and its headquarters are located at Chirala. The mandal is situated at the shore of Bay of Bengal and is bounded by Parchur, Karamchedu and Vetapalem mandals.

== Towns and villages ==
As of 2011 census, the mandal has 5 settlements. It includes 2 towns and 4 villages. Chirala is the municipality and its adjoining area was classified as a census town with the same name.

1. Chirala (CT)
2. Chirala (M)
3. Gavinivaripalem
4. Ipurupalem
5. Vodarevu
6. Jandrapeta

Note: M: Municipality, CT: Census town, OG: Out Growth

== See also ==
- Prakasam district
