= Yazali =

- Village
- Interactive map of Yazali
- Location in Andhra Pradesh, India
- Coordinates: 15.886°N 80.547°E
- Country: India
- State: Andhra Pradesh
- District: Bapatla
- Mandal: Karlapalem

Government
  - Type: Panchayati raj
  - Body: Yazali gram panchayat

Area
  - Total: 2,423 ha (5,990 acres)

Population (2011)
  - Total: 7,975
  - Density: 329.1/km^{2} (852.5/sq mi)

Languages
  - Official: Telugu
- Time zone: UTC+5:30 (IST)
- Area code: +91–
- Vehicle registration: AP

Yazali is a village in Bapatla district of the Indian state of Andhra Pradesh. It is located in Karlapalem mandal of Tenali revenue division.

== Geography ==
Yazali is situated to the south of the mandal headquarters, Karlapalem, at 15.886°N 80.547°E. It is spread over an area of 2,423 ha (5,990 acres).

== Demographics ==
As of 2001 India census, Yazali had a population of 3,103. Males constituted 51% of the population and females 49%. Yazali has an average literacy rate of 23%, lower than the national average of 59.5%; with 35% of the males and 15% of females literate. 10% of the population is under six years of age. The majority occupation of the village is agriculture.

== Governance ==
Yazali gram panchayat is the local self-government of the village. It is divided into wards, and each ward is represented by a ward member.

== Education ==
As per the school information report for the academic year 2018–19, the village has 11 schools. These include 2 private and 9 Zila/Mandal Parishad schools.
