= Chintayapalem =

- Village
- Interactive map of Chintayapalem
- Location in Andhra Pradesh, India
- Coordinates: 15.923657°N 80.554491°E
- Country: India
- State: Andhra Pradesh
- District: Bapatla

Languages
  - Official: Telugu
- Time zone: UTC+5:30 (IST)

Chintayapalem is a village in Bapatla district of the Indian state of Andhra Pradesh. It is located in Karlapalem mandal of Tenali revenue division.
