= Ramalingeswara Swamy Temple =

Hindu temple in Andhra Pradesh, India

Ramalingeswara Swamy Temple, located in Santharavuru, Chinnaganjam Mandal Bapatla district, Andhra Pradesh is dedicated to the deity Ramalingeswara (the Hindu god Shiva). The temple dates back to the Chola period (12th century AD). According to The Hindu the temple administrators claim that the temple has a bell that reverberates 108 times when struck once, and that there are only two such bells the other being at Kashi.
