= Venkanna =

Venkanna refers to Lord Venkateswara.

Venkanna is one of the Indian personal names:

- Balakrishna Venkanna Naik, famous Member of Indian Parliament.
- Gorantla Venkanna was a well-known philanthropist, lover and patron of Sanskrit language.
- Goreti Venkanna is a popular Indian poet and folk singer.
