= Chinaganjam =

Chinnaganjam ganjam
- Village
- Location in Andhra Pradesh, India Chinnaganjam (India)
- Coordinates: 15.7°N 80.25°E
- Country: India
- State: Andhra Pradesh
- District: Bapatla
- Mandal: Chinnaganjam
- Founder: PEEKA SAIKUMAR
- Boroughs: Ambedkar Nagar, Chinnaganjam

Area
  - Total: 10,000 km^{2} (3,900 sq mi)
  - Rank: 1

Languages
  - Official: Telugu
- Time zone: UTC+5:30 (IST)
- Postal code: 523135
- Vehicle registration: AP

Chinnaganjam is a village in Bapatla district of the Indian state of Andhra Pradesh. It is the mandal headquarters of Chinaganjam mandal in Chirala revenue division.

== Geography ==
Chinnaganjam is located at 15.7°N 80.25°E.
