= Kokkiligadda =

Kokkiligadda - Kothapalem
- Village
- Interactive map of Kokkiligadda - Kothapalem
- Location in Andhra Pradesh, India Kokkiligadda - Kothapalem (India)
- Coordinates: 16°5′41″N 80°53′39″E
- Country: India
- State: Andhra Pradesh
- District: Krishna

Area
  - Total: 12.78 km^{2} (4.93 sq mi)

Population (2011)
  - Total: 4,893
  - Density: 382.9/km^{2} (991.6/sq mi)

Languages
  - Official: Telugu
- Time zone: UTC+5:30 (IST)
- PIN: 521125
- Vehicle registration: AP

Kokkiligadda-Kothapalem is a village in Krishna district of the Indian state of Andhra Pradesh. It is located in Mopidevi mandal of Machilipatnam revenue division. The village is a part of the Andhra Pradesh Capital Region under the jurisdiction of APCRDA. The nearest towns are Challapalli and Avanigadda which are 5 km away and the famous Subrahmanyeswara Swamy temple, Mopidevi is also located 5 km away from this village .

It comes under Avanigadda Assembly constituency .

== See also ==
- List of villages in Krishna district
