= Ravipudi Venkatadri =

Indian writer and activist (1922–2023)

- Born: 9 February 1922; Nagandla, Prakasam District, Andhra Pradesh, India
- Died: 21 January 2023 (aged 100)
- Occupation(s): Writer and activist
- Years active: 1940–2023

Ravipudi Venkatadri (9 February 1922 – 21 January 2023) was an Indian activist in the rationalist and humanist movements.

Venkatadri was born into a middle-class peasant family in 1922 at Nagandla, a village in Prakasam district in Andhra Pradesh, turned to rationalist ideas in 1940 after reading Sambukavada written by Tripuraneni Rama Swamy. Ravipudi was the founder director of Kavirajasram, Nagandla (1943). He propagated rationalist ideas in and around Nagandla. He attended the study camps organised by M. N. Roy at Dehradun (1946) and Mussorie (1949). He was the founder president of Rationalist Association of Andhra Pradesh. He was elected president of Rationalist Associations of India (RAI) in 1989, and Radical Humanist Association (Andhra Pradesh) in 1993. He established Hetuvada Manavavada – HEMA (acronym from Hetuvada-Manavavada, meaning Rationalist-Humanist) – Foundation and was the founder editor of Hetuvadi – a rationalist periodical in Telugu language which was established in September 1982.

Venkatadri conducted and headed a number of study camps to educate the cadre on rationalist and humanist lines. He has written extensively in Telugu on science, religion, rationalism, Marxism, materialism, atheism and other subjects. He wrote over 90 books, edited them into 23 Volumes, translated six of them into English and published them through Hetuvada Manavavada Publication (popularly mentioned as HEMA Publication), from Chirala, Andhra Pradesh. Some of his books have been translated into Hindi, Punjabi, Gujarati, Malayalam and English. He started Hetuvadi, a Telugu monthly magazine, to propagate the aims of the Andhra Pradesh Rationalist Association for which he had been elected president since 1979. He led Rationalist Associations of India (RAI) for over two decades. He was the chairman of it. He is supposed to be the first author to write a book on rationalism with the title Rationalism. It was published in 1978. He toured America and Europe to participate in the Humanist Conferences held there in the year 1993.

Venkatadri extensively and frequently toured to attend rationalist conferences and study classes. He had visited Kerala, Mumbai, Delhi and other places in the country to strengthen rationalist movement.

Venkatadri delivered speeches on rationalism and humanism at various universities, including Andhra University, Vizag Telugu University and Telugu Academy in Hyderabad. He had received award from the then vice-president of India in 1996 for his remarkable intellectual life.

== Political life ==
In 1945, Ravipudi Venkatadri joined the Radical Democratic Party founded by M. N. Roy. He contested the combined Madras State elections in 1946 from Bapatta-Ongole constituency but was defeated. He was unanimously elected as Nagandla village president and continued in the post for 40 years from 1956 to 1996. He brought about radical changes in the village on rationalist and humanist lines while he was holding this position.

== Personal life and death ==
Venkatadri turned 100 in February 2022. Even at the advanced age of 100 he continued writing, proof reading, editing and publishing Hetuvadi and Rationalist-Humanist literature on behalf of the organizations he was a part of.

Venkatadri died on 21 January 2023.

== Awards ==
In 2021 he received Dr A T Kovoor National Award instituted by Bharatheeya Yukthivadi Sangham on his 100th birthday. The award was to appreciate his activism and achievement, spreading free-thought and rationalism. One of the previous recipients of Dr A T Kovoor Award was superstar Kamal Haasan. A prolific rationalist author Ravipudi Venkatadri has also received the Kondaveeti Venkatakavi Sahitya Peetham Lifetime Achievement Award in 2021. He received "Modern Charwaka National Award" from Charvaka Kala Peetham, Nellore, Andhra Pradesh in 2021. He received Tripuraneni Ramaswamy National Award from Kaviraju Trust, Hyderabad which was presented through the hands of K. R. Narayanan, then Vice President of India. He was also given the "Bharateeyudu" Award from Bharateeyam, Ongole.

== Radical Humanist Centre ==
Radical Humanist Centre at Inkollu, Andhra Pradesh was founded by Ravipudi. It constructed a building on the land donated by Ravi Subbarao, a retired post master. This building houses a conference hall, rooms for guests including amenities for them and a well stocked library with back issues of the monthly magazine Hetuvadi, books on rationalism, humanism and atheism – mostly written by Ravipudi Venkatadri himself.

== Hetuvadi ==
Hetuvadi – a monthly journal, meaning of the title in English The Rationalist – is devoted to Science, Rationalism and Humanism was being edited by Ravipudi Venkatadri. This periodical in Telugu was started in the year 1982.

== Quote of Ravipudi ==
"If we hang on to the concept of Godhood, that has been drowning mankind in the deep waters of ignorance for thousands of years – in spite of the fact that it is unfounded, useless and unproven – evidently it shows that we do not accept evolution of ideas."

== Books by Ravipudi ==
Books authored by Ravipudi Venkatadri
