= Rajupalem =

Rajupalem may refer to:

- K. Rajupalem, Prakasam district, in the state of Andhra Pradesh, India
- Rajupalem, Guntur district, in the state of Andhra Pradesh, India
- Rajupalem, Kadapa district, in the state of Andhra Pradesh, India
