= Upputuru =

Coordinates: 15°57′3.6″N 80°17′20.4″E

- village
- Interactive map of Upputuru
- Country: India
- State: Andhra Pradesh
- District: Bapatla district

Area
  - Total: 27.21 km^{2} (10.51 sq mi)

Population (2011)
  - Total: 7,448
  - Density: 273.7/km^{2} (708.9/sq mi)

Languages
  - Official: Telugu
- Time zone: UTC+5:30 (IST)
- PIN: 523169
- Vehicle registration: AP-26

Upputuru, also known as Upputur, is a small village located in Parchur mandal, Bapatla district, Andhra Pradesh, India.
