= Garikapadu =

Garikapadu may refer to the following places in Andhra Pradesh, India:

- Garikapadu, Guntur district
- Garikapadu, Krishna district, a village in Krishna district
