= Gorantla Venkanna =

Gorantla Venkanna Choudary (1871–1947) was a well-known philanthropist, lover and patron of Sanskrit language.

== Introduction ==
Gorantla Venkanna Chowdary was born in 1871 in a small village, Timmasamudram, in Prakasam district, in what is now the state of Andhra Pradesh, India. His ancestors migrated from Murikipudi (near Narasaraopeta) to Timmasamudram. His parents were Veeranna and Punnamma. The family owned a large estate of 1,200 acres (5 km^{2}) of agricultural land.

== Education ==
From an early age Venkanna showed inclination towards Sanskrit language and literature, Ayurveda and yoga. Sanskrit scholar Achyutanna Srirama Sastri was instrumental in influencing the interests of Venkanna.

Venkanna made many donations to Sanskrit schools, libraries and scholars. He established a high school and Oriental school (GVS High School) in Ongole and a Sanskrit school in Timmasamudram. All the students of these schools receive free accommodation and boarding facilities. The well-known library in Vetapalem known as Saraswata Niketanam received substantial contributions from him.

Venkanna also donated 268 acres (1.08 km^{2}) of land to a trust meant for the encouragement of Sanskrit teaching and preparation of Ayurveda products.

== Freedom movement ==
Venkanna was an ardent follower of Tanguturi Prakasam Pantulu, the freedom fighter and first chief minister of the state of Andhra Pradesh. Mahatma Gandhi was impressed by the selfless service, generosity and philanthropy of Mr Venkanna and visited Timmasamudram twice. A large donation of lands was made to Harijans in the presence of Gandhi. Thousands of homeless people affected by the cyclone of 1936 were fed and liberally helped to make new homes.

Having given up his lands and property for the public good and Sanskrit language, he became an ascetic and led a life of austerity.

He died on 21 November 1947.
