= Marripudi, Bapatla district =

Marripudi
- Village
- Interactive map of Marripudi
- Location in Andhra Pradesh, India
- Coordinates: 15.9882783°N 80.5037402°E
- Country: India
- State: Andhra Pradesh
- District: Bapatla

Languages
  - Official: Telugu
- Time zone: UTC+5:30 (IST)
- Vehicle registration: AP

Marripudi is a village in the Bapatla district of the Indian state of Andhra Pradesh.
