= Yadavuru =

- Village
- Interactive map of Yadavuru
- Location in Andhra Pradesh, India
- Coordinates: 16.19100°N 80.68250°E
- Country: India
- State: Andhra Pradesh
- District: Bapatla district
- Mandal: Amruthallur

Government
  - Type: Panchayati raj
  - Body: Yadavuru Gram Panchayat
  - Sarpanch: Kurra Nagamalleswar

Languages
  - Official: Telugu
- Time zone: UTC+5:30 (IST)
- Vehicle registration: AP

Yadavuru is a village in Bapatla district of the Indian state of Andhra Pradesh. It is located in Amruthallur mandal of Tenali revenue division.

== Government and politics ==
Yadavuru gram panchayat is the local self-government of the village. The panchayat has a total of 10 wards and each ward is represented by an elected ward member. The present sarpanch of the gram panchayat is Kurra Nagamalleswari, who got elected in the year 2013.
