= Vetapalem railway station =

Railway station in Andhra Pradesh, India

Vetapalem

General information
- Location: National Highway 216, Vetapalem, Andhra Pradesh; India
- Coordinates: 15°46′48″N 80°19′12″E
- System: Indian Railways station
- Owner: Indian Railways
- Operator: South Coast Railway zone
- Line: Vijayawada–Chennai section
- Platforms: 5[total] 1 side platform 2 island platform
- Tracks: 6

Construction
- Structure type: Standard (on-ground station)
- Parking: Yes
- Cycle facilities: Yes
- Accessible: Yes

Other information
- Station code: VTM
- Zone(s): South Coast Railway zone
- Division(s): Vijayawada
- Fare zone: Indian Railways

History
- Opened: Yes
- Former names: South Central Railway zone

Services
Preceding station	Indian Railways	Following station
Jandrapeta towards ?	South Central Railway zone Vijayawada–Chennai section of Howrah–Chennai main line	Kottapandillapalli towards ?
Location
- Location within Andhra Pradesh Location within India
- Interactive map

Vetapalem railway station (station code:VTM), is located at Vetapalem town of Prakasam district, in the Indian state of Andhra Pradesh. It is under the administration of Vijayawada Railway Division of South Central Railway zone. This station was well connected to Chennai, Bilaspur, Puri, Tirupati, Visakhapatnam, Vizianagaram, Nizamabad, Adilabad, Secunderabad, Bhimavaram, Guntur, Vijayawada, Chirala.

== History ==
The Vijayawada–Chennai link was established in 1899. The Chirala–Elavur section was electrified in 1980–81.

== Classification ==
In terms of earnings and outward passengers handled, Vetapalem is categorized as a Non-Suburban Grade-6 (NSG-6) railway station. Based on the re–categorization of Indian Railway stations for the period of 2017–18 and 2022–23, an NSG–6 category station earns nearly ₹1 crore and handles close to 1 million passengers.
