= Nayudamma =

Nayudamma may refer to:

- Yarlagadda Nayudamma, Indian pediatric surgeon
- Yelavarthy Nayudamma (1922–1985), Indian chemical engineer and a scientist killed on Air India Flight 182
