= COVID-19 pandemic in Arunachal Pradesh =

Ongoing COVID-19 viral pandemic in Arunachal Pradesh, India

- Disease: COVID-19
- Pathogen: SARS-CoV-2
- Location: Arunachal Pradesh, India
- First outbreak: Wuhan, Hubei, China
- Arrival date: 2 April 2020 (6 years, 7 months, 2 weeks and 6 days)
- Confirmed cases: 95 (15 June 2020)
- Active cases: 88
- Recovered: 7 (15 June 2020)
- Deaths: 0
- Fatality rate: 0%

The first case of the COVID-19 pandemic in India was reported on 30 January 2020, originating from China. Slowly, the pandemic spread to various states and union territories including the state of Arunachal Pradesh. The first case was recorded in this region on 2 April 2020.

As of 2 February 2022, more than 1.26million cases of COVID-19 have been confirmed in Arunachal Pradesh.

== Timeline ==
=== 2020 ===
==== June 2020 ====
- As of 5 June 2020, the total number of cases in Arunachal Pradesh is 42. There are 41 active cases and one has fully recovered from the virus.
- As of 7 June, the total number of cases was 50, including 49 active cases and one recovery.
- As of 13 June, the total number of cases is 87, including 83 active cases and four recoveries.
- On 19 June, total cases in Arunachal Pradesh crossed 100 mark.
- As of 25 June, the total number of cases was 172, including 129 active cases and 42 recoveries.

==== July 2020 ====
- As of 4 July, the total number of cases in Arunachal were 259, including 182 active cases, 76 cures and 1 death.
- As of 7 July, the total number of cases was 276, including 169 active cases, 105 recoveries and 2 deaths.
- As of 15 July, the total number of cases was 491, including 335 active cases and 153 recoveries. Three persons died from the virus.
- As of 19 July, the total number of cases in Arunachal was 740, including 455 active cases and 282 recoveries and 3 fatalities.
- On 24 July, total cases in Arunachal Pradesh crossed tally of 1000.
- As of 25 July, the total number of cases was 1126, including 695 active cases and 428 cures and 3 deaths.

==== August 2020 ====
- As of 1 August, the total number of cases in Arunachal Pradesh was 1674, including 702 active cases, 969 cures and 3 deaths.
- As of 5 August, the total number of cases was 1790, including 682 active cases, 1105 recoveries and 3 deaths.
- As of 8 August, the total number of cases was 2049, including 720 active cases, 1326 cures and 3 deaths.
- As of 12 August, the total number of cases was 2430, including 768 active cases, 1659 cures and 3 fatalities.
- As of 18 August, the total number of cases was 2875, including 921 active cases, 1949 recoveries and 5 deaths.
- As of 19 August, the total number of cases was 2950, including 923 active cases, 2022 cures and 5 deaths.
- As of 20 August, the total number of cases was 3066, including 968 active cases, 2093 recoveries and 5 deaths.
- As of 25 August, the total number of cases was 3412, including 899 active cases, 2508 cures and 5 fatalities.
- As of 28 August, the total number of cases was 3745, including 1029 active cases, 2709 cures and 7 deaths.

==== September 2020 ====
- Kurung Kumey district reported its first case on 1 Sep, before 1 Sep Kurung Kumey district & Lakshadweep district remained the only two districts of India (out of total 741 districts) not to report any COVID-19 cases, now only Lakshadweep left with zero cases.
- On 7 September, Arunachal Pradesh passed a grim milestone of 5000 total covid cases.
- As of 12 September, the total number of cases in Arunachal Pradesh was 5961, including 1698 active cases, 4253 cures and 10 deaths.
- As of 13 September, the total number of cases was 6121, including 1732 active cases, 4379 recoveries and 10 deaths.
- As of 17 September, the total number of cases was 6851, including 1871 active cases, 4967 cures and 13 deaths.
- As of 21 September, the total number of cases was 7595, including 1939 active cases, 5643 recoveries and 13 deaths.
- As of 28 September, the total number of cases was 9332, including 2725 active cases, 6592 recoveries and 15 deaths.

==== October 2020 ====
- On 2 October, Arunachal Pradesh reached a grim milestone of 10000 total covid cases. As of 2 October, the total number of cases in Arunachal Pradesh was 10720, including 3019 active cases, 7183 cures and 18 deaths.
- As of 7 October, the total number of cases in Arunachal Pradesh was 11267, including 2850 active cases, 8396 cures and 21 fatalities.
- As of 11 October, the total number of cases was 12147, including 2891 active cases, 9232 cures and 24 deaths.
- As of 13 October, the total number of cases was 12561, including 2960 active cases, 9573 recoveries and 28 fatalities.
- As of 27 October, the total number of cases was 14472, including 2139 active cases, 12297 cures and 36 fatalities.
- As of 31 October, the total number of cases was 14852, including 1856 active cases, 12959 cures and 37 deaths.

==== November 2020 ====
- As of 4 November, the total number of cases in Arunachal Pradesh was 15160, including 1645 active cases, 13472 cures and 43 deaths.
- As of 10 November, the total number of cases was 15581, including 1484 active cases, 14051 recoveries and 46 deaths.
- As of 23 November, the total number of cases was 16092, including 1007 active cases, 15036 cures and 49 deaths.
- As of 25 November, the total number of cases was 16174, including 968 active cases, 15157 cures and 49 have died.
- As of 29 November, the total number of cases in the state was 16269, including 851 active cases, 15364 cures and 54 fatalities.

==== December 2020 ====
- As of 3 December, the total number of cases in Arunachal Pradesh was 16348, including 769 active cases, 15525 cures and 54 deaths.
- As of 6 December, the total number of cases was 16395, including 735 active cases, 15605 cures and 55 fatalities.
- As of 11 December, the total number of cases was 16479, including 685 active cases, 15739 recoveries and 55 deaths.
- As of 13 December, the total number of cases was 16513, including 252 active cases, 16206 cures and 55 deaths.
- As of 16 December, the total number of cases was 16574, including 241 active cases, 16278 cures and 55 deaths.
- As of 28 December, the total number of cases was 16696, including 119 active cases, 16521 recovered and 56 have died.
- As of 31 December, the total number of cases was 16719, including 99 active cases, 16564 recovered and 56 have died.

=== 2021 ===
==== January 2021 ====
- As of 3 January, the total number of cases in Arunachal Pradesh was 16732, including 93 active cases, 16583 cures and 56 deaths.
- As of 10 January, the total number of cases was 16772, including 66 active cases, 16650 cures and 56 deaths.
- As of 14 January, the total number of cases was 16798, including 68 active cases, 16674 cures and 56 deaths.
- As of 19 January, the total number of cases was 16815, including 52 active cases, 16707 cures and 56 fatalities.
- As of 24 January, the total number of cases was 16819, including 18 active cases, 16745 cures and 56 deaths.
- As of 28 January, the total number of cases was 16827, including 15 active cases, 16756 recoveries and 56 deaths.

==== February 2021 ====
- As of 1 February, the total number of cases in Arunachal Pradesh was 16828, including 10 active cases, 16762 recoveries and 56 deaths. There wasn't any Covid related death in the state in the entire month of January.
- As of 7 February, the total number of cases was 16830, including 7 active cases, 16767 recoveries and 56 deaths. For the first time since April 2020, the state has number of active cases in a single digit.
- As of 11 February, the total number of cases was 16832, including 5 active cases, 16771 recoveries and 56 deaths.
- As of 20 February, the total number of cases was 16836, including 5 active cases, 16775 recoveries and 56 fatalities.
- As of 28 February, there were no active cases left, without any increase in the total number of 16836 cases. There were 16780 recoveries with 56 fatalities.

==== March 2021 ====
- As of 2 March, a fresh case was reported with rise in the total number of 16837 cases. There were total of 16780 recoveries with 56 fatalities. There wasn't any Covid related death in the state in the entire month of January and February.
- As of 3 March, the total number of cases in Arunachal Pradesh was 16838, including 2 active cases, 16780 recoveries and 56 fatalities.
- As of 6 March, the total number of cases was 16839, including 3 active cases, 16780 recoveries and 56 deaths.
- As of 22 March, the total number of cases was 16842, including 2 active cases, 16784 cures and 56 deaths.
- As of 29 March, the total number of cases was 16845, including 4 active cases, 16785 recoveries and 56 deaths.

==== April 2021 ====
- As of 1 April, the total number of cases in Arunachal Pradesh was 16845, including 4 active cases, 16785 recoveries and 56 deaths.
- As of 3 April, the total number of cases was 16849, including 8 active cases, 16785 recoveries and 56 deaths.
- As of 9 April, the total number of cases was 16873 with 12 new cases reported, including 29 active cases, 16788 recoveries and 56 deaths.
- As of 18 April, the total number of cases was 16967 with addition of 19 new cases, including 105 active cases, 16806 recoveries without any change in deaths at 56.
- As of 24 April, the total number of cases was 17430 with addition of 134 new cases, including 453 active cases, 16921 recoveries without any increase in death toll at 56.

==== May 2021 ====
- As of 8 May, the total number of cases in Arunachal Pradesh was 20048, including 2005 active cases, 17983 recoveries and 60 deaths.
- As of 11 May, the total number of cases was 20575, including 1924 active cases, 18583 recoveries and 68 fatalities.
- As of 17 May, the total number of cases was 22106, including 2346 active cases, 19675 cures and 85 deaths.
- As of 19 May, the total number of cases was 22799, including 2585 active cases, 20125 recoveries and 89 deaths.
- As of 25 May, the total number of cases was 24573, including 3127 active cases, 21344 cures and 102 deaths.
- As of 30 May, the total number of cases was 26778 with addition of 471 new cases, including 3918 active cases, 22746 recoveries and 114 deaths. The Capital Complex Region - Itanagar, Naharlagun, Nirjuli and Banderdewa areas had the highest number of active cases at 724, followed by Changlang (471), Tawang (467) and Namsai (308). The State Disaster Management Authority, in a meeting with Chief Minister Pema Khandu on 28 May, decided to extend the existing lockdown in these seven districts for seven days, until 7 June.

==== June 2021 ====
- As of 7 June, the total number of cases reported in Arunachal Pradesh was 29336, with addition of 223 fresh cases, including 3593 active cases, 25618 recoveries and 125 deaths. The Capital Complex Region – Itanagar, Naharlagun, Nirjuli and Banderdewa areas had the highest number of active cases at 690, followed by Tawang (368), Changlang (338), Namsai (260), Lower Subansiri (226), Lohit (225) and West Kameng with 217 cases. The Yazali administration in Lower Subansiri district started giving away free 20 kg rice to those who came forward to take the COVID-19 jab.
- As of 14 June, the total number of cases was 31382, with addition of 134 new cases, including 2885 active cases, 28252 recoveries and 145 deaths. The recovery rate increased to 90.31% while the active percentage stood at 9.22% and the positivity rate at 3.58%. The Capital Complex Region continued to report increasing number of fresh cases with 35, followed by West Kameng (19), Anjaw (18), Changlang (15) and Lower Subansiri at 11.
- As of 18 June, the total number of cases was 32483, including 2713 active cases, 29612 recoveries and 158 deaths.
- As of 21 June, the total number of cases was 33081, including 2515 active cases, 30407 cures and 159 deaths.
- As of 24 June, the total number of cases was 33916, with addition of 252 fresh cases, including 2567 active cases, 31189 recoveries and without increase in fatalities at 160. The recovery rate stood at 91.96%.
- As of 26 June, the total number of cases was 34480, with addition of 266 new cases, including 2523 active cases, 31792 recoveries and the death toll rose to 165 with 3 new deaths.
- As of 30 June, the total number of cases was 35571, with addition of 344 new cases, including 2687 active cases, 32716 recoveries and the death toll slightly rose to 168 with 1 new death. The recovery rate stood at 91.97% and the positivity rate was at 7.01%.

==== July 2021 ====
- As of 5 July, the total number of cases reported in Arunachal Pradesh was 37105, with addition of 168 fresh cases, including 2961 active cases, 33967 recoveries and death toll pushed to 177 with 1 new death. The recovery rate stood at 91.54% with the active percentage at 7.98% and the positivity rate was at 4.6%.
- As of 10 July, the total number of cases reported was 39085, with addition of 403 fresh cases, including 3557 active cases, 35342 recoveries with 305 patients recovered and death toll pushed to 186 with 1 new death. The recovery rate slightly decreased at 90.42% with increase in the active percentage at 9.10% and the positivity rate was at 6.79%.
- As of 13 July, the total number of cases in the state was 40383, including 3918 active cases, 36274 recoveries and 191 deaths.
- As of 15 July, the total number of cases reported was 41279, with addition of 465 fresh cases, including 4181 active cases, 36903 recoveries with 286 patients recovered and death toll pushed to 195 with 2 new fatalities. The recovery rate remained decreasing at 89.40% with increase in the active percentage at 10.13% and the positivity rate was at 9.28%.
- As of 20 July, the total number of cases reported was 43328, with addition of single-day highest 508 fresh cases, including 4260 active cases, 38865 recoveries with 458 patients recovered and death toll climbed to 203 fatalities with an 80-year-old man dying from East Siang. The positivity rate remained at 7.73%. Major new COVID-19 cases reported from Capital Complex at 140, followed by Lohit (49), Papumpare (35), Lower Subansiri (34) and East Siang (33).
- As of 26 July, the total number of cases reported was 45867, with addition of 164 fresh COVID cases, including 4266 active cases, 41385 recoveries with 360 patients recovered and death toll climbed to 216 fatalities with each death from Capital Complex and Tawang. The positivity rate decreased to 4.39% and the recovery rate remained at 90.23%.
- As of 31 July, the total number of cases reported was 47856, with addition of 379 fresh cases, including 4142 active cases, 43488 recoveries with 488 patients recovered and death toll climbed to 226 fatalities with one new death. The positivity rate increased to 6.13%, active percentage to 8.65% and the recovery rate slightly increased to 90.87%.

==== August 2021 ====
- As of 7 August, the total number of cases reported in Arunachal Pradesh was 49668, with the addition of 227 fresh cases, including 3032 active cases, 46399 recoveries and death toll pushed to 237 with 1 new death. The recovery rate stood at 93.42% with the active percentage at 6.1% and the positivity rate was at 4.68%.
- As of 16 August, the total number of cases reported in Arunachal Pradesh was 51348, with the addition of 48 fresh cases, including 1920 active cases, 49176 recoveries and death toll climbed to 252 fatalities. The recovery rate increased to 95.77% with the active percentage decreased at 3.74% and the positivity rate was at 3.85%.
- As of 26 August, the total number of cases reported in Arunachal Pradesh was 52525, with the addition of 116 new cases, including 1162 active cases, 51104 recoveries and death toll climbed to 259 fatalities. The recovery rate improved to 97.29% with the active percentage decreased at 2.21% and the positivity rate was at 3.25%.
- As of 27 August, the total number of cases was 52634, including 1150 active cases, 51224 recoveries and 260 deaths.

==== September 2021 ====
- As of 2 September, the total number of cases reported in Arunachal Pradesh was 53102, with addition of 71 fresh cases, including 873 active cases, 51969 recoveries and death remained to 260 fatalities. The recovery rate improved at 97.87% and the positivity rate was decreased to 2.49%.
- As of 19 September, the total number of cases reported in Arunachal Pradesh was 54060, with addition of 32 fresh cases, including 461 active cases, 53328 recoveries and death remained to 271 fatalities. The recovery rate improved at 98.64% and the positivity rate hanged to 1.07%. The active cases tally sank below 1%, with single-day recoveries outnumbering fresh infections.
- As of 23 September, the total number of cases was 54241, including 442 active cases, 53526 recoveries and 273 deaths. The recovery rate was 98.68%, the active cases percentage was 0.81% (<1%) and the positivity ratio remained at 1.77%.

==== October 2021 ====
- As of 5 October, the total number of cases reported in Arunachal Pradesh was 54752, with addition of 27 fresh cases, including 414 active cases, 54061 recoveries and 277 deaths. The recovery rate was 98.74%, the active cases percentage was 0.76% (<1%).
- As of 9 October, the total number of cases was 54881, including 285 active cases, 54316 recoveries and 280 deaths.
- As of 20 October, the total number of cases was 55043, with addition of 12 fresh cases, including 138 active cases, 54625 recoveries and 280 deaths without any change. The recovery rate increased to 99.24%. The active cases percentage (0.25%) and the death rate (0.51%) together remained less than 1%.
- As of 23 October, the total number of cases was 55089, including 142 active cases, 54667 cures and 280 deaths.

==== November 2021 ====
- As of 1 November, the total number of cases in Arunachal Pradesh was 55155, including 101 active cases, 54774 cures and 280 deaths.
- As of 4 November, the total number of cases reported in Arunachal Pradesh was 55161, with addition of 6 fresh cases, including 85 active cases, 54796 recoveries and death toll remained at 280. The recovery rate was 99.34%.
- As of 15 November, the total number of cases reported was 55220, with addition of 4 fresh cases, including 44 active cases, 54896 recoveries and death toll remained at 280. The recovery rate was 99.41% and the positivity rate was 1.79%.
- As of 27 November, the total number of cases was 55260, with addition of 2 fresh cases, including 33 active cases, 54947 recoveries and death toll remained at 280. The recovery rate stood at 99.43% and the positivity rate stood at 0.73% (<1%).

==== December 2021 ====
- As of 1 December, the total number of cases in Arunachal Pradesh was 55276, with addition of 3 fresh cases, including 35 active cases, 54961 cures and 280 deaths without any change. The recovery rate was 99.43%, while the active ratio was 0.06% with the positivity rate at 1.32%.
- As of 12 December, the total number of cases was 55305, with addition of 1 fresh case, including 28 active cases, 54997 cures and 280 deaths with no change. The recovery rate stood at 99.44%.
- As of 22 December, the total number of cases was 55322, with addition of 2 fresh cases, including 22 active cases, 55020 cures and death toll remained at 280.
- As on 29 December, total number of cases was 55334, including 18 active cases, 55036 cures and 280 deaths.

=== Jan to Mar 2022 ===
- As of 1 January, the total number of cases in Arunachal Pradesh was 55343, including 21 active cases, 55040 recoveries and 282 deaths.
- As of 5 January, the total number of cases is 55375, including 45 active cases, 55048 cures and 282 deaths.
- As of 15 January, the total number of cases in the UT was 56493, including 1070 active cases, 55141 cures and 282 fatalities.
- As of 22 January, the total number of cases was 59162, including 2890 active cases, 55990 cures and 282 fatal cases.
- As of 11 February, the total number of cases was 63940, including 850 active cases, 62796 recoveries and 294 deaths.
- As of 16 February, the total number of cases was 64159, including 521 active cases, 63444 cures and 294 deaths.
- As of 1 March, the total number of cases was 64439, including 100 active cases, 64044 cures and 295 deaths.
- As of 19 March, the total number of cases was 64483, including 11 active cases, 64176 recoveries and 296 deaths.

=== Apr to Jun 2022 ===
- As of 11 April, the total number of cases in Arunachal Pradesh was 64490, including 3 active cases, 64190 recoveries and 296 deaths.
- As of 18 April, the total number of cases was 64495, including 6 active cases, 64193 recoveries and 296 deaths.
- As of 1 May, the total number of cases was 64495, including zero active case, 64199 cures and 296 deaths.
- As of 11 May, the total number of cases was 64502, including 5 active cases, 64201 cures and 296 fatalities.
- As of 29 May, the total number of cases was 64505, including 1 active case, 64208 recoveries and 296 deaths.
- As of 9 June, the total number of cases was 64509, including 1 active case, 64212 cures and 296 deaths.
- As of 21 June, the total number of cases was 64512, including 2 active cases, 64214 cures and 296 fatal cases.
- As of 27 June, the total number of cases was 64517, including 5 active cases, 64216 cures and 296 deaths. There hasn't been even a single Covid related death in the region in the last three months

=== July to September 2022 ===
- As of 8 July, the total number of cases in Arunachal Pradesh was 64648, including 125 active cases, 64227 cures and 296 deaths.
- As of 26 August, the total number of cases was 66635, including 90 active cases, 66249 recoveries and 296 deaths.
- As of 31 August, the total number of cases was 66691, including 74 active cases, 66321 cures and 296 fatal cases.
- As of 10 September, the total number of cases was 66772, including 59 active cases, 66417 cures and 296 deaths.
- As of 24 September, the total number of cases was 66830, including 19 active cases, 66515 recoveries and 296 deaths.

=== 2023 ===
- As of 22 March 2023, the total number of cases in Arunachal Pradesh was 66891, including no active cases, 66595 cures and 296 deaths.

== COVID-19 Vaccines with Approval for Emergency or Conditional Usage ==
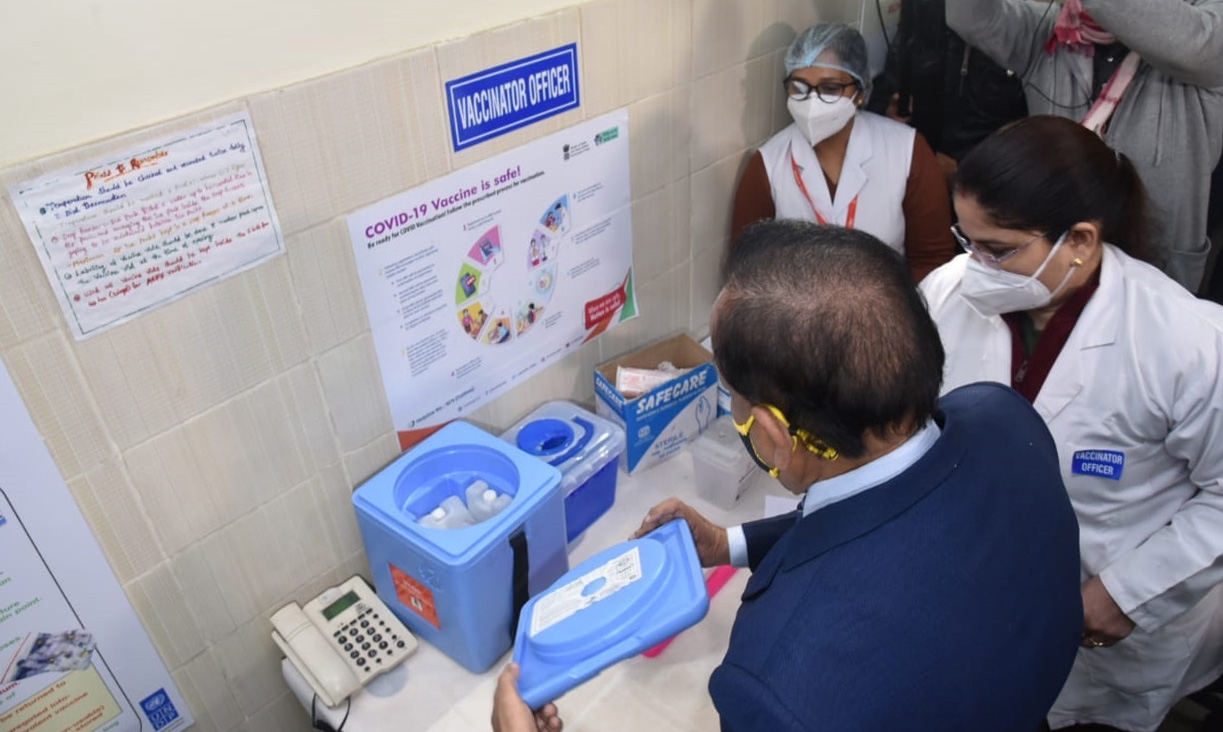
Union Minister for Health & Family Welfare, Dr. Harsh Vardhan visiting the GTB Hospital, Shahdara to review the preparedness of Dry Run of COVID-19 vaccine, in Delhi on January 02, 2021.

=== Covishield ===
On 1 January 2021, the Drug Controller General of India, approved the emergency or conditional use of AstraZeneca's COVID-19 vaccine AZD1222 (marketed as Covishield). Covishield is developed by the University of Oxford and its spin-out company, Vaccitech. It's a viral vector vaccine based on replication-deficient Adenovirus that causes cold in Chimpanzees. It can be stored, transported and handled at normal refrigerated conditions (2-8 °C or 36-46 °F). It has a shelf-life of at least six months.

On 12 January 2021 first batches of Covishield vaccine was despatched from the Serum Institute of India.

=== Covaxin ===
On 2 January 2021, BBV152 (marketed as Covaxin), first indigenous vaccine, developed by Bharat Biotech in association with the Indian Council of Medical Research and National Institute of Virology received approval from the Drug Controller General of India for its emergency or conditional usage.

On 14 January 2021 first batches of Covaxin vaccine was despatched from the Bharat Biotech, albeit it was still in the third phase of testing.

=== Others ===
On 19 May 2021, Dr Reddy's Labs received Emergency Use Authorisation for anti-COVID drug 2-DG. On 21 February 2022, Drugs Controller General of India granted approval to Biological E's COVID-19 vaccine Corbevax, that can be used for children between 12 and 18 years of age.

On 21 October 2021, India completed administering of one billion Covid vaccines in the country.

On 8 January 2022, India crossed 1.5 billion Covid vaccines milestone in the country.

On 19 February 2022, India crossed 1.75 billion Covid vaccines milestone in the country.

== See also ==
- COVID-19 pandemic in India
- COVID-19 pandemic
