= Nagulapalem =

- Village
- Interactive map of Nagulapalem
- Location in Andhra Pradesh, India Nagulapalem (India)
- Coordinates: 15.95454°N 80.2742°E
- Country: India
- State: Andhra Pradesh
- District: Bapatla

Languages
  - Official: Telugu
- Time zone: UTC+5:30 (IST)
- Postal code: 523 169
- Telephone code: 08594 std code

Nagulaplem is a village in Parchur Mandal in Bapatla district in the state of Andhra Pradesh, India. This village is situated at a distance of 42 km (26 mi) south of Guntur on old national highway between Guntur and Ongole. This village is famous for Putta which is close to Parchur. Devotees living vicinity visits this temple and offer their prayers to Lord Subramanyeswara and Lord Anjaneya. This village boasts of a good primary school education system in the region, producing scholars in the region since the 1950s, which led to the all round development in the village with the current generation in prominent positions all through the world. One of the earliest English medium schools in the region has been opened in the 1980s, where the MSFS (missionaries of Saint Francis De Sales) opened a school in this village. This village, is among the well planned villages in the area, with a pond running almost through the length of the village, giving it a cooler breeze even during the hot Indian summer.

== Geography ==
Nagulapalem is located at 15.914°N 80.1184°E. It has an average elevation of 8 meters (32 feet) above sea-level. The annual rainfall due to the southwest monsoon. It has a tropical savanna climate (Köppen climate classification Aw) with hot summers and moderate winters. The hottest months are between April and June.

== Assembly constituency ==
- Constituency:Parchur
- Loksabha: Bapatla

List of Elected Members of assembly constituency:

- 1955 - Kolla Ramaiah Chowadary (INC)
- 1962 - Naraharisetty Venkataswamy (CPI)
- 1967- Gade Venkata Reddy (INC)
- 1972- Maddukuri Narayana Rao (IND)
- 1978 - Maddukuri Narayana Rao(INC)
- 1983 - Daggubati Choudary (TDP)
- 1994 - Gade Venkata Reddy (INC)
- 1999 - Jagarlamudi Lakshmi Padmavathi (TDP)
- 1985(TDP), 1989(TDP), 2004(INC) and 2009(INC) - Daggubati Venkateswara Rao
- 2014 - Yeluri Sambasiva Rao (TDP)

List of Elected Members of Loksabha:

Lok Sabha	Duration	Name of M.P.	Party affiliation
Sixth	1977-80	P. Ankineedu Prasada Rao	Indian National Congress
Seventh	1980-84	P. Ankineedu Prasada Rao	Indian National Congress
Eighth	1984-89	Chimata Sambu	Telugu Desam Party
Ninth	1989-91	Salagala Benjamin	Indian National Congress
Tenth	1991-96	Daggubati Venkateswara Rao	Telugu Desam Party
Eleventh	1996-98	Ummareddy Venkateswarlu	Telugu Desam Party
Twelfth	1998-99	Nedurumalli Janardhana Reddy	Indian National Congress
Thirteenth	1999-2004	Daggubati Ramanaidu	Telugu Desam Party
Fourteenth	2004-09	Daggubati Purandareswari	Indian National Congress
Fifteenth	2009-2014	Lakshmi Panabaka	Indian National Congress
Sixteenth	2014 – present	Sriram Malyadri	Telugu Desam Party
