= National Highway 167A (India) =

National highway in India

National Highway 167A
- Map of the National Highway in red

Route information
- Length: 107 km (66 mi)

Major junctions
- North end: Pondugala village
- South end: Vodarevu

Location
- Country: India
- States: Andhra Pradesh

Highway system
- Roads in India; Expressways; National; State; Asian
← NH 167	→ NH 216

National Highway 167A, commonly called NH 167A is a national highway in India. It is a spur road of National Highway 167. NH-167A traverses the state of Andhra Pradesh in India.

== Route ==
AP/Telangana border (Pondugala), Piduguralla, Narsaraopet, Chilakaluripet, Chirala, Vodarevu

== Junctions ==
Junction with National Highway 216 near Chirala and AH 16 at Chilakaluripeta.

== See also ==
- List of national highways in India
