= Sudivari palem =

Sudivaripalem
- village
- Interactive map of Sudivaripalem
- Location in Andhra Pradesh, India
- Coordinates: 15°53′27″N 80°10′00″E
- Country: India
- State: Andhra Pradesh
- District: Bapatla

Languages
  - Official: Telugu
- Time zone: UTC+5:30 (IST)
- PIN: 523190
- Telephone code: +91-8404
- Vehicle registration: AP-27
- Nearest city: Chirala, Ongole, Guntur, Chilakaluripet, Addanki
- Lok Sabha constituency: Bapatla
- Vidhan Sabha constituency: Parchur

Sudivaripalem is a village in Inkollu Mandal in the Bapatla District of the state of Andhra Pradesh, India.
