= National Highway 216 (India) =

National highway in India

National Highway 216
- Map of the National Highway in red

Route information
- Length: 391.3 km (243.1 mi)

Major junctions
- North end: Kattipudi, Andhra Pradesh
- List: NH 16 at Kathipudi; NH 165 at Palakollu; NH 65 at Machilipatnam; NH 16 at Ongole
- South end: Ongole, Andhra Pradesh

Location
- Country: India
- States: Andhra Pradesh
- Primary destinations: Kakinada, Yanam, Amalapuram, Razole, Palakollu, Narasapuram, Bantumilli, Machilipatnam, Repalle, Cherukupalle, Bapatla, Chirala

Highway system
- Roads in India; Expressways; National; State; Asian
← NH 16	→ NH 216

National Highway 216 (NH 216) (previously: NH 214 and NH 214A) is a National Highway in the Indian state of Andhra Pradesh. The former highways of NH 214 and 214A were merged and renumbered as NH 216. It starts from NH 16 junction at Kattipudi and passes through Kakinada, Amalapuram, Digamarru (Palakollu), Narasapuram, Bantumilli, Machilipatnam, Repalle, Cherukupalle, Bapatla, Chirala before it junctions NH 16 again at Ongole. Visakhapatnam–Kakinada Petro Chemical Corridor, is a proposed project along the highway.

== Route ==
The highway has a total route length of 391.3 kilometres (243.1 mi). It passes through the districts of Kakinada, Konaseema, East Godavari, West Godavari, Krishna, Bapatla and Prakasam of Andhra Pradesh.

National Highway 216 starts from NH16 at Kathipudi village and it passes through towns and cities like Gollaprolu, Pithapuram, Kakinada, Yanam, Mummidivaram, Amalapuram, Razole, Digamarru (Palakollu), Narsapuram, Bantumilli, Pedana, Machilipatnam, Repalle, Cherukupalle, Bapatla, Chirala and connects with NH 16 at Ongole.

== Project details ==
The National Highway-216 stretches from Kathipudi in East Godavari to Ongole in Prakasam district, covering a distance of 456 kilometers along the seacoast and passing through West Godavari, Krishna, and Guntur districts. This highway is considered a boon for the transport needs of these regions. It begins at Kathipudi, intersects NH-16 between Visakhapatnam and Rajamahendravaram, and reconnects to NH-16 at Ongole after traversing the five coastal districts.

As far as East Godavari is concerned, the NH passes from Kathipudi to Kakinada and from there to Yanam(Union Territory), Amalapuram, Bodasakurru and Chinchinada (Palakollu) to Narasapuram in West Godavari. From there it passes through Bantumilli, Machilipatnam, Odalarevu in Guntur district and there to Ongole in Prakasam district.

As far as the road development is concerned, the stretch between Kathipudi and Kakinada for a distance of about 38 kilometres has been widened as four-lane road of 10 metres each stretch. From Kakinada suburbs a bypass road is under progress from Atchampeta in Kakinada rural to Uppalankamondi in Karapa mandal for a distance of about 20 kilometres touching Madhavapatnam, Kovvada, Turangi villages in Kakinada rural, Chollangi village and from there to culvert at Uppalam Kamondi with ROB near Sarpavaram junction railway station with an estimated cost of Rs 150 crore.

As far the road widening is concerned, the process is going on in Amalapuram area as four- lane road. Besides this, the flyover at Bodasakurru near P Gannavaram is under progress. The NH 216 authorities are hoping to complete the four-lane road by last quarter of 2019 and the flyover works for both bypass roads at Kakinada rural and at Bodasakurru by 2020-end.

NH 216 will benefit immensely for the people of these parts for transportation of agriculture produce, fish products and industrial produces. This region needs the highway as there is no rail connectivity to Konaseema region in East Godavari.

== See also ==
- List of national highways in Andhra Pradesh
