= Bapatla revenue division =

Revenue division in Bapatla district, Andhra Pradesh, India

- Revenue division in Bapatla district
- Country: India
- State: Andhra Pradesh
- District: Bapatla
- Formed: 4 April 2022
- Founder: Government of Andhra Pradesh
- Time zone: UTC+05:30 (IST)

Bapatla revenue division is an administrative division in the Bapatla district of the Indian state of Andhra Pradesh. It is one of the three revenue divisions in the district and comprises 6 mandals. It was formed on 4 April 2022 along with the newly formed Bapatla district.

== Administration ==
The revenue division comprises 6 mandals which include Bapatla mandal, Karlapalem mandal, Martur Mandal, Parchur Mandal, Pittalavanipalem mandal, Yeddanapudi mandal.
