= Mopidevi =

Village in Krishna district (Andhra Pradesh), India

- Village
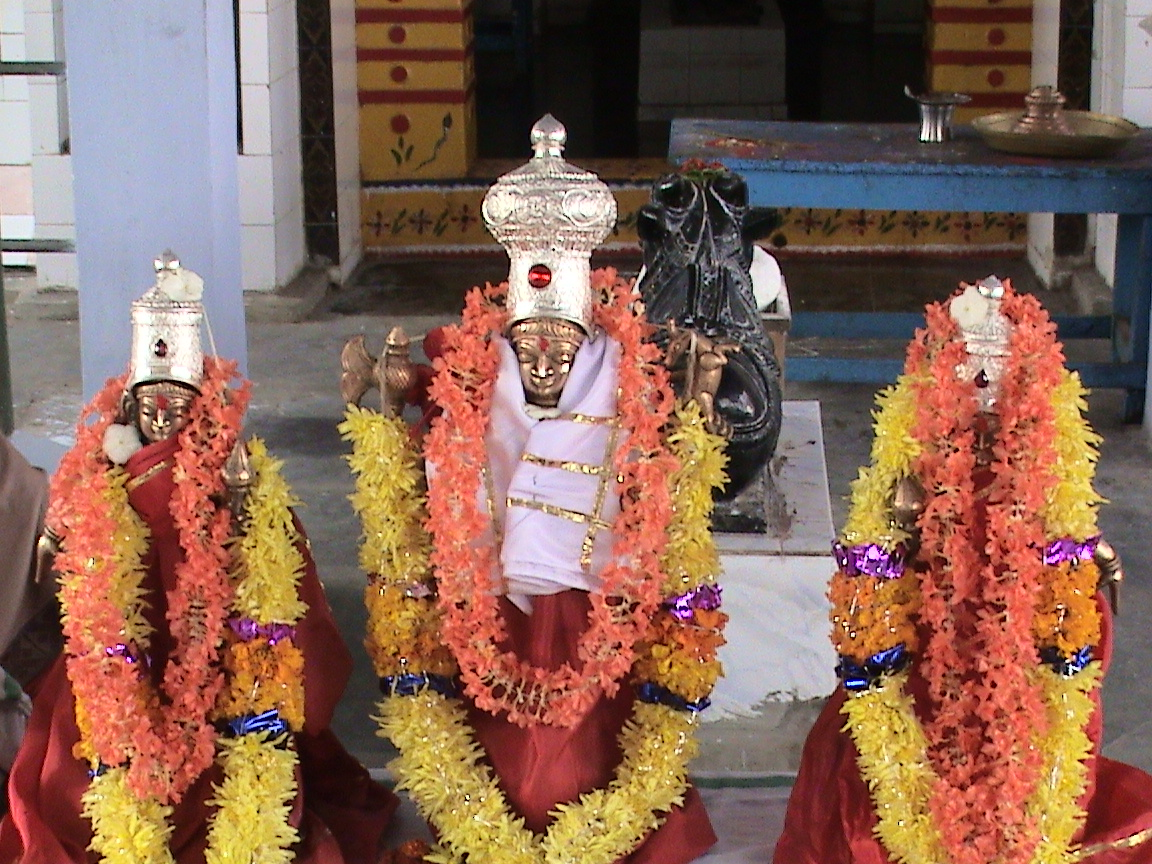
- Utsav Idols of Sri Sakaleshwara Swamy
- Interactive map of Mopidevi
- Location in Andhra Pradesh, India Mopidevi (India)
- Coordinates: 16°03′51″N 80°55′33″E
- Country: India
- State: Andhra Pradesh
- District: Krishna
- Mandal: Mopidevi

Government
  - Type: Panchayat

Area
  - Total: 10.15 km^{2} (3.92 sq mi)

Population (2011)
  - Total: 7,438
  - Density: 732.8/km^{2} (1,898/sq mi)

Languages
  - Official: Telugu
- Time zone: UTC+5:30 (IST)
- PIN: 521125
- Telephone code: +91–8671
- Vehicle registration: AP

Mopidevi is a village in Krishna district of the Indian state of Andhra Pradesh. It is the mandal headquarters of Mopidevi mandal in Machilipatnam revenue division. It is one of the villages in the mandal to be a part of Andhra Pradesh Capital Region. The village is known for its famous Lord Subrahmanyeswar Swamy Temple. The village is situated 80Km from Vijayawada and 30Km from Machilipatnam.

== Transportation ==
NH216, a spur road of NH16 passes through this village. This road connects ongole and Kathipudi village in East godavari district .

APSRTC runs buses from Avanigadda, Gudivada, Kuchipudi, Movva, challapalli, Machilipatnam, Repalle, Ghantasala by connecting mopidevi village.

=== Nearest Railway Stations ===
Machilipatnam railway station (MTM), Gudivada Junction railway station (GDV), Repalle railway station (RAL), Vijayawada Junction railway station (BZ) are the nearest railway stations to this village.

== Economy ==
Paddy is the main cultivated crop in the village.

== See also ==
- Villages in Mopidevi mandal
- Mopidevi Temple
