= Bantumilli mandal =

Bantumilli
- Mandal
- Interactive map of Bantumilli
- Location in Andhra Pradesh, India
- Coordinates: 16.3500°N 81.2833°E
- Country: India
- State: Andhra Pradesh
- District: Krishna
- Headquarters: Bantumilli

Government
  - Body: Mandal Parishad

Area
  - Total: 125.31 km^{2} (48.38 sq mi)

Population (2011)
  - Total: 46,370
  - Density: 370.0/km^{2} (958.4/sq mi)

Languages
  - Official: Telugu
- Time zone: UTC+5:30 (IST)
- Vehicle registration: AP 16

Bantumilli mandal is one of the 25 mandals in Krishna district of the Indian state of Andhra Pradesh. The headquarters of this mandal is located at Bantumilli town. The mandal is bordered by Kalidindi mandal to the north, Kruthivennu mandal to the east, Machilipatnam mandal to the south and Pedana mandal to the west.

== Demographics ==
As of 2011 census, the mandal had a population of 46,370 living in 13,335 households. The total population constituted 23,116 males and 23,254 females, for a sex ratio of 1006 females per 1000 males. There were 4,349 children in the age group of 0–6 years, of which 2,217 were boys and 2,132 were girls, for a sex ratio of 962. The average literacy rate stands at 67.68% with 28,439 literates, of which 14,986 are males and 13,453 are females. There were 6,638 members of Scheduled Castes and 898 members of Scheduled Tribes.

=== Labor Statistics ===
As per the report published by Census of India in 2011, 23,217 people were engaged in work activities, including 14,364 males and 8,853 females. In the census, 19,505 workers describe their work as main work, 2,274 as cultivators, 13,535 as agricultural labourers, 204 in household industry and 3,492 were involved in other works. Of these, 3,712 were marginal workers.

== Administration ==
Bantumilli mandal is administered under the Pedana Assembly constituency of the Machilipatnam Lok Sabha constituency. It is one of the twelve mandals those falls under Machilipatnam revenue division.

== Towns and villages ==
As of 2011 census, there are a total of 18 settlements in the mandal. Bantumilli is the largest and Narayanapuram is the smallest in terms of population.

The settlements in the mandal are:

1. Amudalapalle
2. Arthamuru
3. Bantumilli
4. Barripadu
5. Chinatummidi
6. Chorampudi
7. Kanchadam
8. Korlapadu
9. Maddetipalle
10. Malleswaram
11. Manimeswaram
12. Mulaparru
13. Munjuluru
14. Narayanapuram
15. Peda Pandraka
16. Pedatumidi
17. Pendurru
18. Ramavarapumodi
19. Satuluru

== Education ==
The mandal plays a major role in education for the rural students of nearby villages. The primary and secondary school education is imparted by government, aided by private schools, under the School Education Department of the state. As per the school information report for the academic year 2015–16, the mandal has more than 6,525 students enrolled in over 69 schools.

== See also ==
- List of mandals in Andhra Pradesh
- Vijayawada
