= Parchur mandal =

- Mandal
- Interactive map of Parchur mandal
- Location in Andhra Pradesh, India
- Coordinates: 15.967°N 80.264°E
- Country: India
- State: Andhra Pradesh
- District: Bapatla
- Headquarters: Parchur

Area
  - Total: 225.13 km^{2} (86.92 sq mi)

Population (2011)
  - Total: 53,269
  - Density: 236.61/km^{2} (612.83/sq mi)

Languages
  - Official: Telugu
- Time zone: UTC+5:30 (IST)

Parchur mandal is a mandal in Bapatla revenue division of the Bapatla district Andhra Pradesh, India. Parchur is its headquarter.

== Demographics ==
Religions in Parchur mandal (2011)
Religion	Percent
Hinduism	89.20%
Islam	10.19%
Christianity	0.43%
Other or not stated	0.18%
Distribution of religions

As of 2011 census, the mandal had a population of 53,269 in 15,531 households. The total population constitutes 26,622 males and 28,046 females — a sex ratio of 1053 females per 1000 males. 4,833 children are in the age group of 0–6 years, of which 2,406 are boys and 2,427 are girls — a sex ratio of 1009 per 1000. The average literacy rate stands at 67.71% with 33,741 literates. Scheduled Castes and Scheduled Tribes make up 14,000 (26.28%) and 3,691 (6.93%) of the population respectively.

Languages of Parchur mandal (2011)
1. Telugu (89.4%)
2. Urdu (9.67%)
3. Others (0.89%)

At the time of the 2011 census, 89.44% of the population spoke Telugu and 9.67% Urdu as their first language.
