= Chiruvolu =

- Village
- Interactive map of Chiruvolu
- Location in Andhra Pradesh, India Chiruvolu (India)
- Coordinates: 16.0634583°N 80.9193912°E
- Country: India
- State: Andhra Pradesh
- District: Krishna

Area
  - Total: 0.83 km^{2} (0.32 sq mi)

Population (2011)
  - Total: 755
  - Density: 910/km^{2} (2,400/sq mi)

Languages
  - Official: Telugu
- Time zone: UTC+5:30 (IST)

Chiruvolu is a village in Krishna district of the Indian state of Andhra Pradesh. It is located in Mopidevi mandal of Machilipatnam revenue division. It is one of the villages in the mandal to be a part of Andhra Pradesh Capital Region.
