= Nagandla =

Village in Bapatla district, Andhra Pradesh, India

Coordinates: 15°53′N 80°09′E

Nagandla (Village ID 590735) is a Panchayat village in Inkollu mandal of Bapatla district, Andhra Pradesh. Its pin code is 523190. According to the 2011 census it has a population of 4126 living in 1082 households. Its main agriculture product is rice growing.
