= Yarlagadda Nayudamma =

Indian surgeon

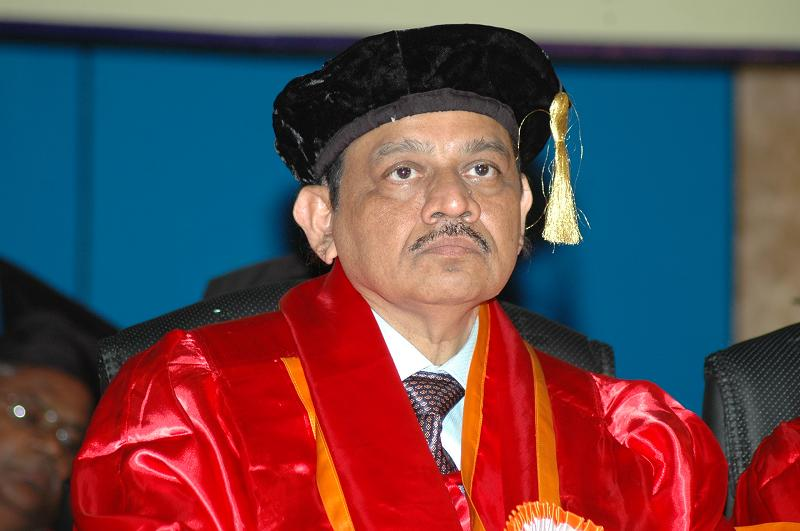
- Nayudamma at the Acharya Nagarjuna University Convocation where he was conferred the Doctor of Science degree in March 2008.
- Born: 1 June 1947 (age 79); Karamchedu, Madras Presidency, British India (now Prakasam District, Andhra Pradesh, Republic of India)
- Occupation: Paediatric Surgeon
- Spouse: Krishna Bharati
- Awards: Padma Shri
- Website: http://www.drynayudamma.org

Yarlagadda Nayudamma (born 1 June 1947) is a consultant paediatric surgeon from Guntur, India. Previously, he operated at the Guntur General Hospital where he was the head of the paediatric surgery department.

He is the only Indian surgeon to have successfully separated three sets of conjoined twins fused at three different locations - head, thorax-abdomen and pelvis.

== Biography ==
Yarlagadda Nayudamma was born to parents Yarlagadda Subba Rao and Rangamma in Karamchedu of Prakasam District (then part of Guntur district), A.P. He graduated in medicine in 1970 from Guntur Medical College, acquired the degree of Master of Surgery in General Surgery in 1974 from Rohtak Medical College, specialized in Paediatric Surgery and obtained the degree of M.Ch. in 1977 from All India Institute of Medical Sciences, New Delhi (AIIMS).

== Awards ==
- Rotary Vocational Excellence Award - 2006 Rovex - 2006
- He was conferred the degree of Doctor of Science by the Acharya Nagarjuna University in March 2008.
