= Bobbarlanka, Krishna District =

Bobbarlanka
- Village
- Interactive map of Bobbarlanka
- Location in Andhra Pradesh, India Bobbarlanka (India)
- Coordinates: 16°04′51″N 80°53′48″E
- Country: India
- State: Andhra Pradesh
- District: Krishna
- Mandal: Mopidevi

Area
  - Total: 7.69 km^{2} (2.97 sq mi)

Population (2011)
  - Total: 754
  - Density: 98.0/km^{2} (254/sq mi)

Languages
  - Official: Telugu
- Time zone: UTC+5:30 (IST)
- PIN: 522264
- Telephone code: +91–8648
- Vehicle registration: AP

Bobbarlanka is a village in Krishna district of the Indian state of Andhra Pradesh. It located in Mopidevi mandal of Machilipatnam revenue division. It is one of the villages in the mandal to be a part of Andhra Pradesh Capital Region.
