= Uppumaguluru =

Uppumaguluru is a gram panchayat in Ballikurava mandal, Prakasam District of Andhra Pradesh, India. The gram panchayat includes Somavarappadu and Kotavaripalem villages. A majority of people depend on agriculture and a few people are involved in granite mining related work. It is in between the towns of Chilakaluripet and Narasaraopet in the Guntur district.

== Local Government ==
It falls into Addanki Constituency for state assembly and Bapatla Constituency for Lok Sabha.

== Education ==
Uppumaguluru has primary and secondary schools, educating students from the three villages in the gram panchayat.

== Transport ==
It has bus services from Chilakaluripet.

== Services ==
Bank of Baroda has started its services in Uppumaguluru along with ATM services. A brick factory operates from this village. The famous Hindu pilgrimage centre Kotappakonda, is 15 km away from the village.
