= Nagayathippa =

- Village
- Interactive map of Nagayathippa
- Location in Andhra Pradesh, India
- Country: India
- State: Andhra Pradesh
- District: Krishna

Area
  - Total: 2.35 km^{2} (0.91 sq mi)

Population (2011)
  - Total: 1,643
  - Density: 699/km^{2} (1,810/sq mi)

Languages
  - Official: Telugu
- Time zone: UTC+5:30 (IST)
- Vehicle registration: AP–16

Nagayatippa is a village in Krishna district of the Indian state of Andhra Pradesh. It is located in Mopidevi mandal of Machilipatnam revenue division.

== See also ==
- Villages in Mopidevi mandal
