= Mopidevi mandal =

- Mandal
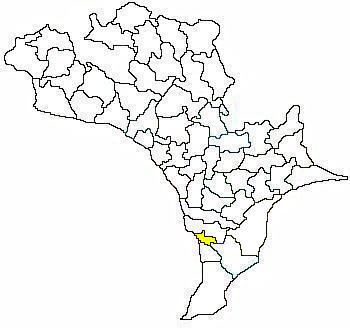
- The Mopidevi mandal within the Krishna district of Andhra Pradesh
- Interactive Map Outlining mandal
- Location in Andhra Pradesh, India
- Coordinates: 16.0667°N 80.9277°E
- Country: India
- State: Andhra Pradesh
- District: Krishna
- Headquarters: Mopidevi

Languages
  - Official: Telugu
- Time zone: UTC+5:30 (IST)

Mopidevi mandal is one of the 25 mandals in Krishna district of the Indian state of Andhra Pradesh. It is under the administration of Machilipatnam revenue division and the headquarters are located at Mopidevi. The mandal is bounded by Challapalli, Koduru and Avanigadda mandals.

== Administration ==
The mandal is partially a part of the Andhra Pradesh Capital Region under the jurisdiction of APCRDA.

== Towns and villages ==
As of 2011 census, the mandal has 18 settlements and all are villages.

The settlements in the mandal are listed below:

1. Annavaram
2. Ayodhya
3. Bobbarlanka
4. Chiruvolu
5. Kaptanupalem
6. Kokkiligadda
7. Kosuruvaripalem
8. Mellamarru
9. Mellamarthi Lanka
10. Merakanapalle
11. Mopidevi *
12. Mopidevi Lanka
13. Nagayathippa
14. North Chiruvolulanka
15. Pedakallepalli
16. Pedaprolu
17. Tekupalle
18. Venkatapuram

Note: M-Municipality, *–Mandal headquarter

== See also ==
- List of villages in Krishna district
