= Garikapadu, Kakumanu mandal =

Garikapadu
- Village
- Interactive map of Garikapadu
- Location in Andhra Pradesh, India
- Coordinates: 16.080438°N 80.429967°E
- Country: India
- State: Andhra Pradesh
- District: Bapatla
- Mandal: Kakumanu

Government
  - Type: Panchayati raj
  - Body: Garikapadu gram panchayat

Area
  - Total: 2,407 ha (5,950 acres)

Population (2011)
  - Total: 4,218
  - Density: 175.2/km^{2} (453.9/sq mi)

Languages
  - Official: Telugu
- Time zone: UTC+5:30 (IST)
- Area code: +91–
- Vehicle registration: AP

Garikapadu is a village in Bapatla district of the Indian state of Andhra Pradesh. It is located in Kakumanu mandal of Tenali revenue division.

== Geography ==
Garikapadu is situated to the northeast of the mandal headquarters, Kakumanu, at 16.080438°N 80.429967°E. It is spread over an area of 2,407 ha (5,950 acres).

== Governance ==
Garikapadu gram panchayat is the local self-government of the village. It is divided into wards and each ward is represented by a ward member.

== Education ==
As per the school information report for the academic year 2018–19, the village has 8 Zilla/Mandal Parishad schools.
