= Chirala revenue division =

Revenue division in Bapatla district, Andhra Pradesh, India

- Revenue division in Bapatla district
- Country: India
- State: Andhra Pradesh
- District: Bapatla
- Formed: 4 April 2022
- Revised: 31 December 2025
- Founder: Government of Andhra Pradesh
- Time zone: UTC+05:30 (IST)

Chirala revenue division is an administrative division in the Bapatla district of the Indian state of Andhra Pradesh. It is one of the three revenue divisions in the district and comprises 5 mandals.

== History ==
It was established on 4 April 2022 along with the newly formed Bapatla district. Initially, Chirala revenue division was created with 13 mandals. However, after the review of the 2022 reorganisation, the division was reduced to its present 5 mandals as of December 31, 2025.

== Administration ==
The revenue division comprises 33 villages across the following 5 mandals:

- Chirala mandal (Chirala)
- Chinaganjam mandal (Chinaganjam)
- Inkollu mandal (Inkollu)
- Karamchedu mandal (Karamchedu)
- Vetapalem mandal (Vetapalem)
