= Mopidevi Lanka =

- Village
- Interactive map of Mopidevi Lanka
- Location in Andhra Pradesh, India Mopidevi Lanka (India)
- Coordinates: 16.0932°N 80.9161°E
- Country: India
- State: Andhra Pradesh
- District: KRISHNA

Area
  - Total: 1.50 km^{2} (0.58 sq mi)

Population (2011)
  - Total: 615
  - Density: 410/km^{2} (1,060/sq mi)

Languages
  - Official: Telugu
- Time zone: UTC+5:30 (IST)
- PIN: 521125
- Vehicle registration: AP–07

Mopidevi Lanka is a village in Krishna district of the Indian state of Andhra Pradesh. It is located on the banks of Krishna River in Mopidevi mandal of Machilipatnam revenue division. It is a part of Andhra Pradesh Capital Region.

== Demographics ==
As of 2011 census of India, the village had a population of 615. The total population consists of 311 males and 304 females —a sex ratio of 978 females per 1000 males. 63 children are in the age group of 0–6 years, of which 34 are boys and 29 are girls. The average literacy rate stands at 65.76% with 363 literates.

== Transport ==
NH 214A passes through Mopidevi Lanka.
