= Bantumilli =

- Village
- Nickname: Bantumilli - The Town Of Traffic
- Interactive map of Bantumilli
- Location in Andhra Pradesh, India
- Coordinates: 16°22′15″N 81°16′20″E
- Country: India
- State: Andhra Pradesh
- District: Krishna
- Mandal: Bantumilli
- Established: Ancient Indian times

Government
  - Type: Panchayat

Area
  - Total: 3.94 km^{2} (1.52 sq mi)
- Elevation: 0.5 m (1.6 ft)

Population (2011)
  - Total: 6,867
  - Density: 1,740/km^{2} (4,510/sq mi)

Languages
  - Official: Telugu
- Time zone: UTC+5:30 (IST)
- Postal code: 521324
- Vehicle registration: AP–39,40

Bantumilli is a village in the Krishna district of the Indian state of Andhra Pradesh. It is the mandal headquarters of Bantumilli mandal of Machilipatnam revenue division. It is well connected by road. It is located at 28 km (17 mi) from Machilipatnam, 50 km (31 mi) from Bhimavaram, 34 km (21 mi) from Gudivada, and 55 km (34 mi) from Narasapuram.

== Transportation ==
=== Public Transportation ===
Bantumilli has an extensive bus network operated by APSRTC. Bantumilli also has a Bus stand with Major Bus Routes to Machilipatnam, Gudivada, Narasapuram, Palakollu, Vijayawada, Kakinada, Amalapuram, Visakhapatnam, Bhimavaram, Avanigadda, Nagayalanka and more bus services to local villages.

APSRTC Will Also Run Special Bus Services On This Route Like Every Saturday Special Bus Service To Vadapalli - Venkateswara Swamy Temple Etc.

Private buses also run to Bangalore, Tirupati, Hyderabad, Visakhapatnam, and other Towns/Cities.

=== Roads and Highways ===
Bantumilli has NH-216 Highway connecting to Coastal Andhra Pradesh Towns and Cities, plus several state roads to some Towns/Villages.

Bantumilli Town Has Small Wide Roads In Inner Of The Town If You Go On Busy Hours You Will Stuck In Traffic If It Will Clear Easyily But Sometimes It Will Take Upto 15+Minutes

== Demographics ==
As of 2011 census, the village had a population of 6,867 with 1,922 households. The total population constitute 3,411 males and 3,456 females, a sex ratio of 1019 females per 1000 males. 673 children are in the age group of 0–6 years, of which 338 are boys and 335 are girls. The average literacy rate stands at 79.17% with 10,001 literates, significantly higher than the state average of 67.41%.

== See also ==
- Villages in Bantumilli mandal
