= Koniki =

- Village
- Interactive map of Koniki
- Location in Andhra Pradesh, India Koniki (India)
- Coordinates: 16.5677°N 81.0323°E
- Country: India
- State: Andhra Pradesh
- District: Eluru

Government
  - Body: Gram Panchayat

Population (2011)
  - Total: 2,097

Languages
  - Official: Telugu
- Time zone: UTC+5:30 (IST)
- PIN: 534 437

Koniki is a village in Eluru district of the Indian state of Andhra Pradesh. It is located in Pedapadu mandal of Eluru revenue division. The nearest railway station is located at Chirala which is more than 10 km from Koniki.

== Demographics ==
As of 2011 Census of India, Koniki had a population of 2097. The total population constitutes 1081 males and 1016 females with a sex ratio of 940 females per 1000 males. 212 children are in the age group of 0–6 years with sex ratio of 767. The average literacy rate stands at 64.99%.
