= Saraswata Niketanam =

Saraswata Niketanam Library
- Saraswata Niketanam
- Location: Vetapalem, Andhra Pradesh, India
- Established: 1918
- Reference to legal mandate: Societies Registration Act, 1920

Collection
- Size: 1 lakh

Other information
- Employees: 10

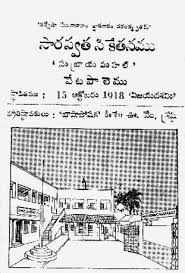
Saraswata Niketanam, Vetapalem

Saraswata Niketanam Library is located in Vetapalem, Chirala mandal, Andhra Pradesh, India. It is one of the oldest libraries in India, and has on display a rare collection of Palm leaf manuscripts and paper written in Hindi, Telugu, Sanskrit and a few other languages indigenous to India. The collection comprises well over 90,000 volumes, with a majority of these on display. The library has a complete catalogue of holdings, which is being made available online. Some rare holdings can be viewed on site by prior arrangement.

== History ==
It is one of the foremost research oriented libraries of Andhra Pradesh. This library, founded by late V.V. Shreshti in 1918 and later on "Pantulu Garu" (Adusumalli Srinivasa Rao) anchored the library, had the rare privilege and good fortune of its foundation stone being laid by The Father of the Nation, Mahatma Gandhi, in 1929. In 1935, then president Babu Rajendra Prasad visited the library. The buildings were opened by Seth Jamnalal Bajaj and Tanguturi Prakasam Pantulu. It has been the fountain of inspiration to the youth during the freedom struggle.

The Saraswata Niketanam library was started with the following objectives: To promote and propagate Literature, Morality, Character, Patriotism, Humanity, Philanthropy, Devotion etc., in all possible ways by establishing and maintaining Stationary as well as Travelling Libraries equipped with all-sided books on Sanskrit; Telugu and English literatures (both ancient and modern); by organizing Reading Rooms furnished with newspapers and magazines; by starting and maintaining Free Schools for the poor; by reading out books and papers to the illiterate; by delivering open air lectures and magic lantern lectures; and by educating and enlightening the people at large in all the ways and means conducive to the country's cause.

Since 1918 the Saraswata Niketanam Library has been a privately run non-profit organization.

Initially named Hindu Yuvajana Sangham, since it was backed by the youth in the freedom movement, it gained popularity very quickly and became a major meeting place during freedom struggle.

The library enjoyed the patronage of persons like Mahatma Gandhi, Rajendra Prasad, Chilakamarti Lakshmi Narasimham, Kasinathuni Nageswara Rao, Cattamanchi Ramalinga Reddy and Pathuri Nagabhushanam. It had the reputation of quenching the literary thirst of people from foreign origin as well.

== Efforts ==
Rajupalepu Venkata Seshagiri Rao was the last secretary of the library under the committee. K.V.D. Mallikarjuna Rao is the president.

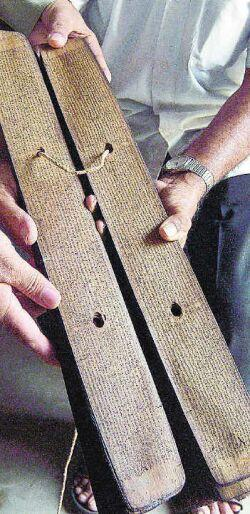
Secretary R.V.Seshagiri Rao displaying the palm leaf manuscripts.

== Some of the rare books and manuscripts ==
- Books from the 12th century
- The 100 volumes of Gandhi’s words
- Writings on revolutionary Alluri Sitaramaraju at the IIC
- Silver coated stylus for writing on palm leaves
- Gandhis original broken stick
- Independence day edition of news paper 1947
- Palm leaf manuscripts
- 20,000+ rare books. Of them, 1,800 books were published prior to 1900, around 18,115 books by 1943 and 25,000 books up to 1950.

== Collection ==
As of 2013 the library is having approximately 90,000 books, including 60000 of Telugu, 20,974 of English, 1,011 of Hindi, 302 Urdu books, 1687 other books, 121 palm leaf manuscripts and 20 unpublished manuscripts.

After the Gowthami Grandhalayam in Andhra Pradesh, the biggest in the region is Saraswata Niketanam Library.
