= Chirala =

- City
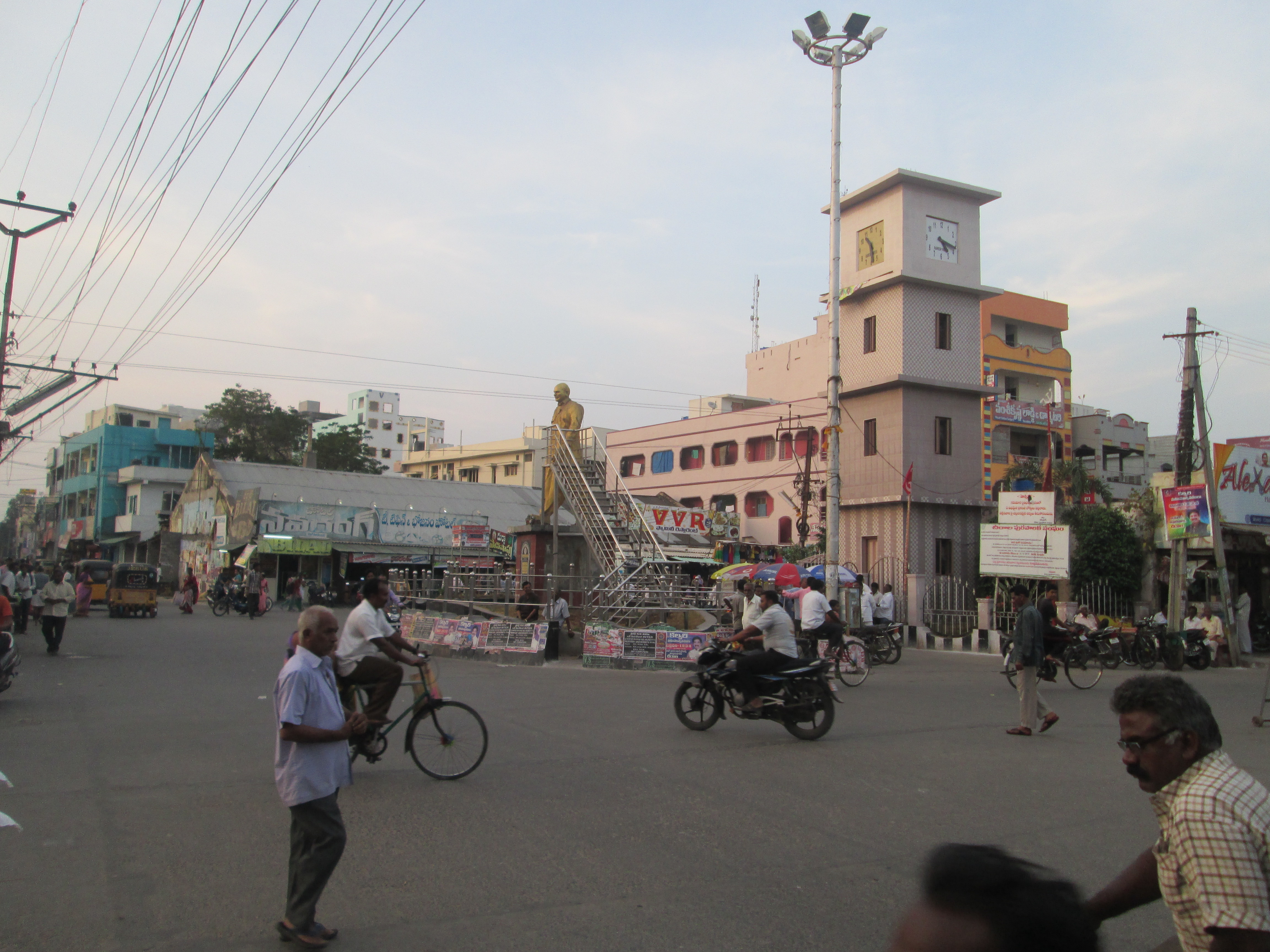
- Clock Tower Centre in Chirala
- Nicknames: Chirala; Kshirapuri; Chinna Bombay or Small Mumbai
- Location in Andhra Pradesh, India
- Coordinates: 15.8246°N 80.3521°E
- Country: India
- State: Andhra Pradesh
- District: Bapatla

Government
  - Type: Municipal council
  - Body: Chirala Municipality

Area
  - Total: 13.26 km^{2} (5.12 sq mi)
- Elevation: 3 m (9.8 ft)

Population (2011)
  - Total: 172,000
  - Density: 13,000/km^{2} (33,600/sq mi)

Languages
  - Official: Telugu
- Time zone: UTC+5:30 (IST)
- PIN: 523 155
- Telephone code: +91–8594
- Vehicle registration: AP-27
- Website: Chirala Municipality

Chirala, is a coastal city in Bapatla district of the Indian state of Andhra Pradesh. It is a municipality and the headquarters of Chirala mandal in Chirala revenue division. As of 2011, it had a population of above 170,000.

Chirala is the most populated city in Bapatla Lok Sabha Constituency.

== Climate ==
The City experiences tropical climate with the average annual temperature records at 28.5 °C (83.3 °F). Hot summers and cool winters are observed due to its proximity to the coast of Bay of Bengal. It receives both South west monsoon and North-east monsoon as well. The precipitation is very high with an annual rainfall of about 200 millimetres (8 in) and the month of October receives a maximum rainfall of 197 millimetres (8 in).

== Demographics ==
As of 2011 census of India, the city had a population of 172,826 with 23,070 households. It shows 2.04% growth in population, compared to 2001 Census of India which was recorded as 100,455. The total population constitute, 52,927 males and 47,528 females —a sex ratio of 1031 females per 1000 males, higher than the national average of 940 per 1000. 8,389 children are in the age group of 0–6 years, of which 4,253 are boys and 4,136 are girls —a ratio of 973 girls per 1000 boys. The average literacy rate stands at 78.80% with 62,099 literates, higher than the national average of 73.00%.

The urban agglomeration population of the city is 162,471.

== Economy ==
Handloom weaving industry is one of the main industries the city. Chirala Mandal consists of various villages in which Agriculture is the main source of income. Paddy, Maize are the crops majorly cultivated across villages of Chirala. Coastal Villages of Chirala get their income by Fishery.

Chirala also boasts a long coastline, with a number of beaches. Vodarevu and Ramapuram are the most famous, with the hospitality industry blooming in their vicinity owing to the State Government's increasing focus.

== Geography ==
The coordinates of the city are 15.8246°N 80.3521°E and is located at an altitude of 3 m (9.8 ft) from the coast of Bay of Bengal.

== Governance ==
Chirala retained its position as municipal town since 1871 As of 1981 census of India except for a short period of about two years from 1938 to 1940 when it was suspended and it was converted in to Panchayat, due to political reason. Its position as municipal town was again restored in December, 1940.At present Chirala Municipality is the civic governing body of the city. It is a first grade municipality, constituted on 1 December 1940 and has a jurisdictional area of 13.57 km^{2} (5.24 sq mi) with 33 election wards. The present Municipal Commissioner of the city is P.Sreenivasa Rao. The constituents of Chirala urban agglomeration include, Chirala Municipality, census City of Chirala, Vetapalem; out growths of Ipurupalem, Ramakrishna Puram and Kothapeta.

== Education ==
The primary and secondary school education is imparted by government, aided and private schools, under the School Education Department of the state.

== Transport ==
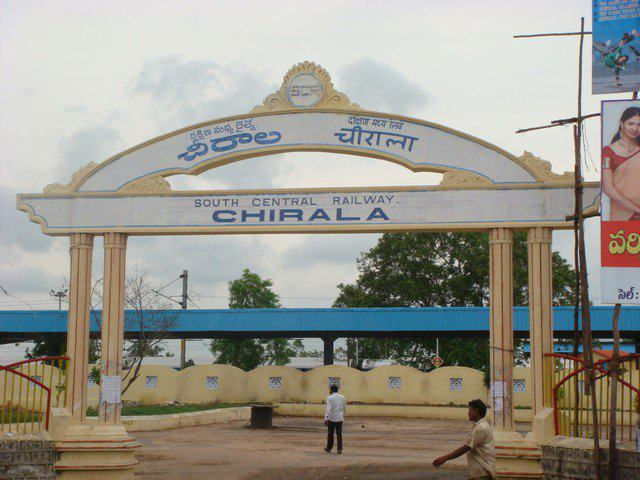
Chirala railway station main entrance

The town is also well connected with National and State highways. The National Highway 216 passes through the town, which connects Ongole with Kattipudi . State Highway 48, also referred as Guntur-Bapatla-Chirala Road, connects the city with Guntur. National Highway 167A connects it with Piduguralla, which passes through Narasaraopet and Chilakaluripet.

Public transport includes the buses operated by state-run APSRTC services. Chirala railway station is an A–Category station in Vijayawada railway division of South Central Railway zone and it is located on the Howrah-Chennai main line of Indian Railways.

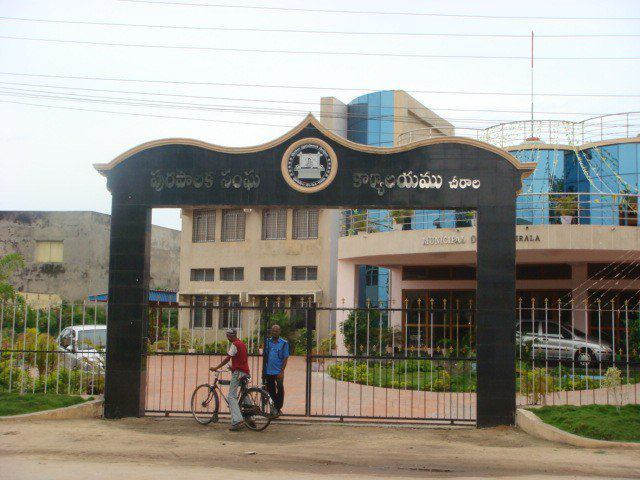
Municipal office

== See also ==
- List of towns in Andhra Pradesh
- List of municipalities in Andhra Pradesh
