= Santhamaguluru =

Santhamaguluru సంతమాగులూరు
- Village
- Location in Andhra Pradesh, India
- Coordinates: 16°07′49″N 79°56′55″E
- Country: India
- State: Andhra Pradesh
- District: Prakasam
- Mandal: Santhamaguluru
- Villages in Mandal: Multiple villages under Santhamaguluru Mandal

Government
  - Type: Gram Panchayat and Mandal Parishad
  - Body: Santhamaguluru Gram Panchayat

Population (2011)
  - Total: 9,687
- Time zone: UTC+5:30 (IST)

Santhamaguluru is a village in the Prakasam district of the Indian state of Andhra Pradesh. It is under the jurisdiction of the Santhamaguluru Mandal within the Addanki revenue division.

== Demographics ==
According to the 2011 Census of India, Santhamaguluru has a total population of 9,687. Of this, 5,049 were males and 4,638 were females. The village is 23.92% Scheduled Caste (SC) population and 4.57% Scheduled Tribes (ST). The literacy rate of Santhamaguluru was 59.67%, the male rate being 71.08%, while the female literacy rate being 47.35%.
