= Ipurupalem =

- Out growth
- Location in Andhra Pradesh, India Ipurupalem (India)
- Coordinates: 15.8495°N 80.3861°E
- Country: India
- State: Andhra Pradesh
- District: Bapatla

Population (2011)
  - Total: 40,482

Languages
  - Official: Telugu
- Time zone: UTC+5:30 (IST)
- PIN: 523166
- Telephone code: 08594

Ipurupalem is a village in Chirala mandal, Bapatla district of the Indian state of Andhra Pradesh.

== Government and politics ==
It is administered by gram panchayat. The elected members of the gram panchayat is headed by a sarpanch.
