= Parchur =

Parchur Paruchuru
- Village
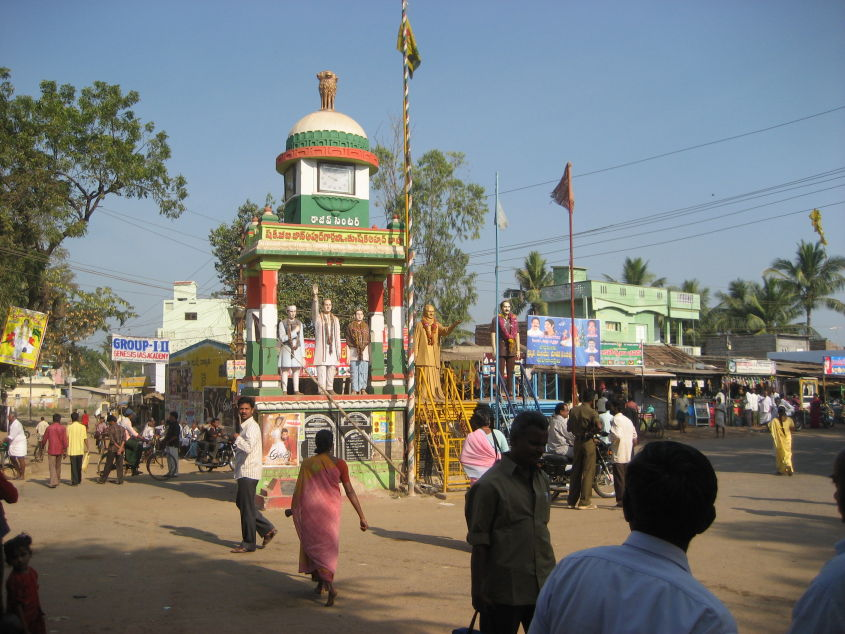
- Parchur Centre
- Interactive map of Parchur
- Location in Andhra Pradesh, India Parchur (India)
- Coordinates: 15.967°N 80.275°E
- Country: India
- State: Andhra Pradesh
- District: Bapatla
- Mandal: Parchur

Government
  - Type: democratic

Population (2011)
  - Total: 13,375

Languages
  - Official: Telugu
- Time zone: UTC+5:30 (IST)
- Telephone code: +91–8594
- Vehicle registration: AP

Parchur, natively known as Paruchuru, is a village and an Assembly constituency in Bapatla district of Andhra Pradesh, India. It is also the mandal headquarters of Parchur mandal in Bapatla revenue division.

== Geography ==
Parchur is located at 15.9667°N 80.2667°E.

According to the 2011 Census of India, the total population of Parchur was then 13,379, of which 6,628 were male and 6,751 were female.

== Transport ==
Guntur-Parchur Road connects the village with Guntur and Ongole.

== See also ==
- Vupputur
- Nagulapalem
