= Martur =

Martur మార్టూరు Marturu
- village
- Interactive map of Martur మార్టూరు
- Location in Andhra Pradesh, India Martur మార్టూరు (India)
- Coordinates: 15.9862446°N 80.1040948°E
- Country: India
- State: Andhra Pradesh
- District: Bapatla
- Mandal: Martur

Government
  - Type: state government(AP)
  - Body: CM

Population
  - Total: 21,434

Languages
  - Official: Telugu
- Time zone: UTC+5:30 (IST)
- PIN: 523301
- Vehicle registration: AP

Martur, also known as Marturu, is a village in Bapatla district of the Indian state of Andhra Pradesh. It is the mandal headquarters of Martur mandal in Bapatla revenue division. As of 2011 Census of India, Martur had a population of 21,437 with average literacy rate of 67.48%. Martur is famous for granite polishing industries, vegetable market and also an educational hub for surrounding villages.

== Geography ==
Martur is located at 15.98615°N 80.10405°E. It has an average elevation of 30 meters (101 feet).

== Assembly constituency ==
Martur was an assembly constituency in Andhra Pradesh since 1952 to 2004 except few years in between. The Assembly constituency was abolished in the year 2009 due to delimitation of Assembly and parliamentary constituencies.
