= Martur mandal =

- Mandal
- Interactive map of Martur mandal
- Location in Andhra Pradesh, India
- Coordinates: 15.988°N 80.102°E
- Country: India
- State: Andhra Pradesh
- District: Bapatla
- Headquarters: Martur

Area
  - Total: 180.71 km^{2} (69.77 sq mi)

Population (2011)
  - Total: 73,862
  - Density: 408.73/km^{2} (1,058.6/sq mi)

Languages
  - Official: Telugu
- Time zone: UTC+5:30 (IST)

Martur mandal is a mandal in the Bapatla district in the Coastal Andhra region of Andhra Pradesh, India. Its headquarters are in Martur.

== Demographics ==
Religions in Martur mandal (2011)
Religion	Percent
Hinduism	87.33%
Islam	12.18%
Other or not stated	0.49%
Distribution of religions

As of 2011 census, the mandal had a population of 73,862 in 19,317 households. The total population constitutes 37,083 males and 36,779 females — a sex ratio of 992 females per 1000 males. 7,787 children are in the age group of 0–6 years, of which 3,937 are boys and 3,850 are girls — a sex ratio of 978 per 1000. The average literacy rate stands at 61.08% with 40,358 literates. Scheduled Castes and Scheduled Tribes make up 18,278 (24.75%) and 4,123 (5.58%) of the population respectively.

Languages of Martur mandal (2011)
1. Telugu (85.9%)
2. Urdu (11.6%)
3. Lambadi (1.26%)
4. Others (1.21%)

At the time of the 2011 census, 85.94% of the population spoke Telugu, 11.59% Urdu and 1.26% Lambadi as their first language.
