= Karamchedu =

- Village
- Interactive map of Karamchedu
- Location in Andhra Pradesh, India Karamchedu (India)
- Coordinates: 15°52′56.42″N 80°19′1.24″E
- Country: India
- State: Andhra Pradesh
- District: Bapatla
- Mandal: Karamchedu

Languages
  - Official: Telugu
- Time zone: UTC+5:30 (IST)
- Postal code: 523168
- Lok Sabha constituency: Bapatla
- Assembly constituency: Parchur

Karamchedu is a village in Bapatla district of the Indian state of Andhra Pradesh. It is also the headquarters of Karamchedu mandal in Chirala revenue division.

There are seven villages under Karamchedu mandal:

Village	Population
Audi Pudi	4,597
Daggubadu	5,387
Karamchedu	11,667
Kesavarappadu	814
Kodavalivari Palem	3,472
Kunkalamarru	4,719
Swarna	8,260
Pothinavaripalem
Yarramvaripalem	1,400

== See also ==
- Karamchedu massacre
