= Karlapalem =

- Village
- Interactive map of Karlapalem
- Location in Andhra Pradesh, India
- Coordinates: 15°56′N 80°33′E
- Country: India
- State: Andhra Pradesh
- District: Bapatla
- Mandal: Karlapalem

Government
  - Type: Panchayati raj
  - Body: Karlapalem gram panchayat

Area
  - Total: 2,623 ha (6,480 acres)

Population (2011)
  - Total: 19,874
  - Density: 757.7/km^{2} (1,962/sq mi)

Languages
  - Official: Telugu
- Time zone: UTC+5:30 (IST)
- Area code: +91–
- Vehicle registration: AP

Karlapalem is a village in Bapatla district of the Indian state of Andhra Pradesh. It is the headquarters of Karlapalem mandal in Tenali revenue division.

== Geography ==
Karlapalem is situated at 15°56′N 80°33′E. It is spread over an area of 2,623 ha (6,480 acres). The irrigation water for the village and its surrounding areas is drawn from Prakasam Barrage reservoir, through the Kommamuru and Poondla channels of Krishna Western Delta system.

== Governance ==
Karlapalem gram panchayat is the local self-government of the village. It is divided into wards and each ward is represented by a ward member.

== Education ==
As per the school information report for the academic year 2018–19, the village has 28 schools. These include 10 private and 18 Zilla/Mandal Parishad schools.
