= Karlapalem mandal =

- Mandal
- Interactive map of Karlapalem mandal
- Location in Andhra Pradesh, India
- Coordinates: 15.943°N 80.536°E
- Country: India
- State: Andhra Pradesh
- District: Bapatla
- Headquarters: Karlapalem

Area
  - Total: 105.08 km^{2} (40.57 sq mi)

Population (2011)
  - Total: 50,320
  - Density: 478.9/km^{2} (1,240/sq mi)

Languages
  - Official: Telugu
- Time zone: UTC+5:30 (IST)

Karlapalem is a mandal in the Bapatla district in the Coastal Andhra region of Andhra Pradesh, India. Its headquarters are in Karlapalem.

== Demographics ==
Religions in Karlapalem mandal (2011)
| Religion | Percent |
| Hinduism | 90.54% |
| Islam | 6.88% |
| Christianity | 2.29% |
| Other or not stated | 0.29% |
Distribution of religions

As of 2011 census, the mandal had a population of 50,320 in 14,361 households. The total population constitutes 25,232 males and 25,088 females — a sex ratio of 994 females per 1000 males. 4,684 children are in the age group of 0–6 years, of which 2,401 are boys and 2,283 are girls — a sex ratio of 951 per 1000. The average literacy rate stands at 60.68% with 27,692 literates. Scheduled Castes and Scheduled Tribes make up 8,499 (16.89%) and 3,309 (6.58%) of the population respectively.

Languages of Karlapalem mandal (2011)
1. Telugu (94.0%)
2. Urdu (5.83%)
3. Others (0.17%)

At the time of the 2011 census, 94.00% of the population spoke Telugu and 5.83% Urdu as their first language.
