= Ballikurava =

- Village
- Interactive map of Ballikurava
- Location in Andhra Pradesh, India Ballikurava (India)
- Coordinates: 15°59′46″N 80°01′32″E
- Country: India
- State: Andhra Pradesh
- District: Prakasam
- Mandal: Ballikurva

Languages
  - Official: Telugu
- Time zone: UTC+5:30 (IST)
- PIN: 523301
- Vehicle registration: AP

Ballikurava is a village in Prakasam district of the Indian state of Andhra Pradesh. It is the mandal headquarters of Ballikurava mandal in Addanki revenue division.
