= Ballikurava mandal =

- Mandal
- Interactive map of Ballikurava mandal
- Location in Andhra Pradesh, India
- Coordinates: 16.000°N 80.022°E
- Country: India
- State: Andhra Pradesh
- District: Prakasam
- Headquarters: Ballikurava

Area
  - Total: 225.13 km^{2} (86.92 sq mi)

Population (2011)
  - Total: 53,269
  - Density: 236.61/km^{2} (612.83/sq mi)

Languages
  - Official: Telugu
- Time zone: UTC+5:30 (IST)

Ballikurava mandal is a mandal in the Prakasam district of Andhra Pradesh, India. Its headquarters are in Ballikurava.

== Demographics ==
Religions in Ballikurava mandal (2011)
Religion	Percent
Hinduism	94.62%
Islam	5.05%
Other or not stated	0.33%
Distribution of religions

As of 2011 census, the mandal had a population of 53,269 in 13,661 households. The total population constitute, 26,942 males and 26,327 females — a sex ratio of 977 females per 1000 males. 5,839 children are in the age group of 0–6 years, of which 3,058 are boys and 2,781 are girls — a sex ratio of 909 per 1000. The average literacy rate stands at 56.26% with 26,682 literates. Scheduled Castes and Scheduled Tribes make up 14,258 (26.77%) and 3,331 (6.25%) of the population respectively.

Languages of Ballikurava mandal (2011)
1. Telugu (93.8%)
2. Urdu (4.62%)
3. Lambadi (1.28%)
4. Others (0.29%)

At the time of the 2011 census, 93.81% of the population spoke Telugu, 4.62% Urdu and 1.28% Lambadi as their first language.
