= Kattipudi =

- Village
- Interactive map of Kattipudi
- Location in Andhra Pradesh, India Kattipudi (India)
- Coordinates: 17°15′0″N 82°20′0″E
- Country: India
- State: Andhra Pradesh
- District: Kakinada
- Elevation: 47 m (154 ft)

Population (2011)
  - Total: 10,680

Languages
  - Official: Telugu
- Time zone: UTC+5:30 (IST)
- Vehicle registration: AP
- Coastline: 0 kilometres (0 mi)

Kattipudi is a village in the Kakinada district of Andhra Pradesh State, India.

== Geography ==
The main village is centered at 17°15′0″N 82°20′0″E, which is approximately 47 m above sea level.

Kattipudi is the origin of National Highway NH 216.
