= Vetapalem =

- Census Town
- Location in Andhra Pradesh, India
- Coordinates: 15.78°N 80.32°E
- Country: India
- State: Andhra Pradesh
- District: Bapatla
- Mandal: Vetapalem

Area
  - Total: 11.14 km^{2} (4.30 sq mi)

Population (2011)
  - Total: 38,671
  - Density: 3,471/km^{2} (8,991/sq mi)

Languages
  - Official: Telugu
- Time zone: UTC+5:30 (IST)
- PIN: 523187
- Vehicle registration: AP

Vetapalem is a census town in Bapatla district of the Indian state of Andhra Pradesh. It is the mandal headquarters of Vetapalem mandal in Chirala revenue division. Vetapalem has one famous library "Saraswatha Library". Also Vetapalem is famous for its cashew processing industry.

== Demographics ==
As of 2011 India census, Vetapalem had a population of 38,671. Males constituted 49% of the population and females 51%. Vetapalem had an average literacy rate of 59%, lower than the national average of 59.5%: male literacy was 68%, and female literacy was 50%. In Vetapalem, 11% of the population was under 6 years of age.

== Government and politics ==
Vetapalem gram panchayat is the local self-government of the town. The elected members of the gram panchayat are headed by a sarpanch.

== Education ==
The primary and secondary school education is imparted by government, aided and private schools, under the School Education Department of the state. Schools use English and Telugu as the medium of instruction.
