= Bapatla district =

District in Andhra Pradesh, India

- District
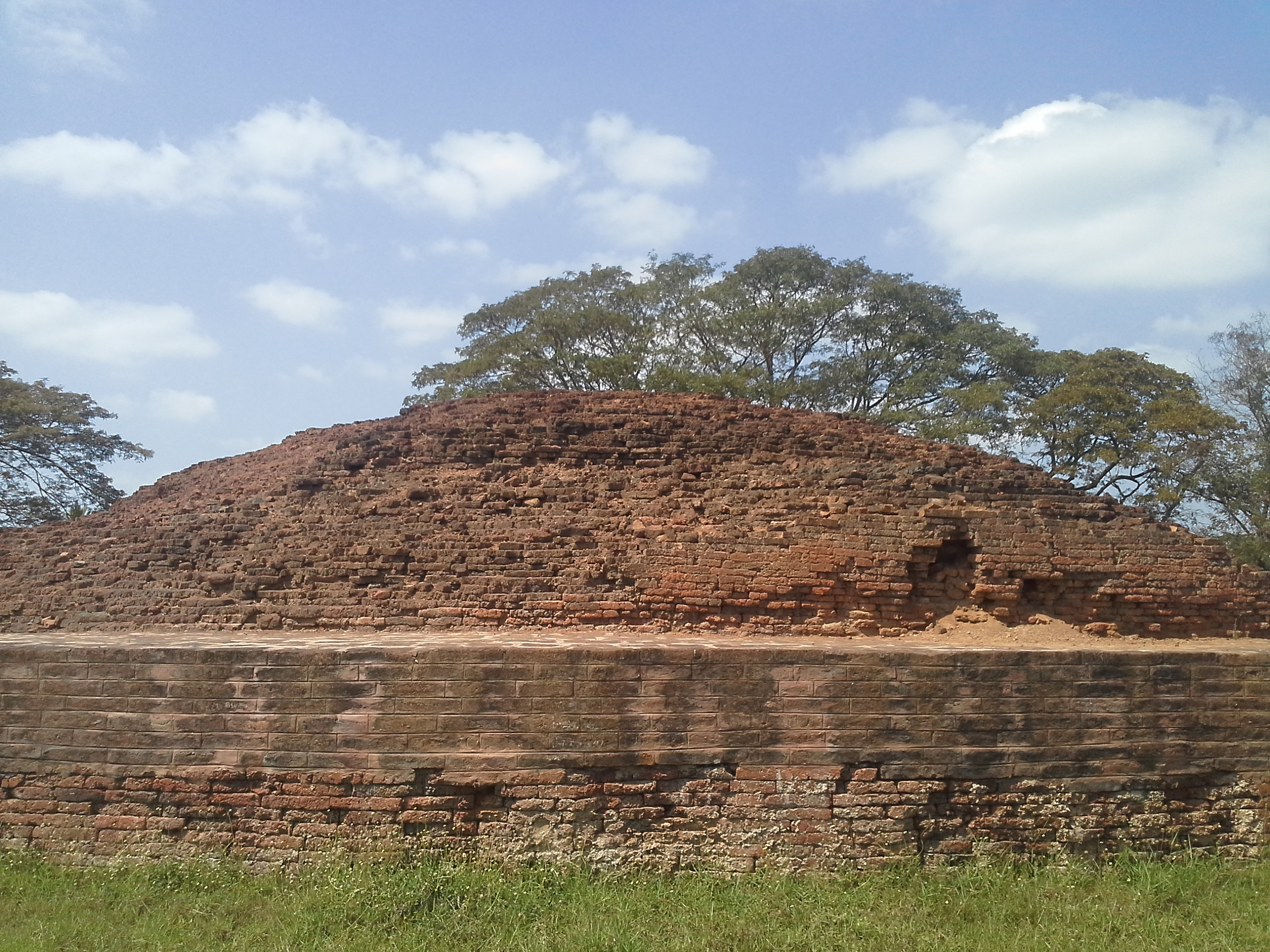
- Stupa at Bhattiprolu

- Location of Bapatla district in Andhra Pradesh
- Interactive map of Bapatla district
- Coordinates: 15.905°N 80.468°E
- Country: India
- State: Andhra Pradesh
- Region: Kosta Andhra
- Established: 4 April 2022
- Revised: 31 December 2025
- Headquarters: Bapatla
- Administrative divisions: 03 revenue divisions; 20 mandals

Government
  - Collector & District Magistrate: Dr.V Vinod Kumar, I.A.S.
  - Superintendent of Police: Tushar Dudi, I.P.S.
  - Lok Sabha constituency: Bapatla
  - MP: Krishna Prasad Tenneti
  - Assembly constituencies: 05

Area
  - Total: 3,828.84 km^{2} (1,478.32 sq mi)

Population (2011)
  - Total: 1,586,918
  - Density: 414.464/km^{2} (1,073.46/sq mi)
- Time zone: UTC+05:30 (IST)
- District LGD code: 750
- District abbreviation: BPT
- Website: bapatla.ap.gov.in

Bapatla district is a district in Kosta Andhra in the Indian state of Andhra Pradesh (AP) established on 4 April 2022. The administrative headquarters are in Bapatla. It has an Indian Air Force station and several universities.

== Etymology ==
Named after Bhavanarayana Swamy temple, it was originally called Bhavapuri, and later to Bhavapatla and finally, Bapatla, in due course.

== History ==
Bapatla Taluka was created in 1794. During May 26–27, 1913 meeting of the first Andhra Mahasabha at the townhall, the foundation for separate state for Andhras was mooted. During Independence movement, Chirala-Perala movement of 1919 led by Duggirala Gopalakrishnaiah became prominent at national level. In 1977, a proposal to form Bapatla district was made by Kolla Venkaiah, communist leader.

On April 4, 2022, as part of forming districts with parliamentary constituencies as the basis, the district was created with parts from erstwhile Prakasam district and Guntur districts. Following the review of the 2022 boundaries, the Addanki Assembly constituency was transferred from Bapatla back to Prakasam district. This included the Addanki, Ballikurava, Santhamaguluru, J. Panguluru, and Korisapadu mandals from Chirala revenue division, changing the total number of mandals in Bapatla district from 25 to 20. The changes came into effect on December 31, 2025.

== Geography ==
This district is surrounded to the north by Guntur district and Palnadu district, south by the Bay of Bengal, west by the Prakasam district and east by the Krishna district.

=== Natural resources ===
Sand reaches occur in Bhattiprolu and Kollur Mandals. Gravel is present in Amarthalur, Kollur, Bhattiprolu, Karlapalem and Bapatla mandals.

Good deposits of coloured granites occur around Uppumaguluru and Konidena.

== Demographics ==
Religions in Bapatla district as of 2025 based on 2011 census (Note: Most Christians in the district identify themselves as Hindus to avail reservation benefits, the real proportion of Christians being around 15-20% of the population)
Religion	Percent
Hinduism	91.45%
Islam	6.99%
Christianity	1.21%
Other or not stated	0.35%

Based on 2011 census, Bapatla district as of the 2025 reorganisation had a population of 1,290,893, of which 284,114 (22.01%) lived in urban areas. It had a sex ratio of 1016 females per 1000 males. Scheduled Castes and Scheduled Tribes made up 284,114 (21.78%) and 62,100 (4.81%) of the population respectively.

Languages of Bapatla district, as of 2025 based on 2011 Census
1. Telugu (92.8%)
2. Urdu (6.30%)
3. Others (0.89%)

At the time of the 2011 census, 93.00% of the population spoke Telugu and 6.12% Urdu as their first language. Hinduism is a majority in the district, while Christians are a significant (underreported) minority of around 15-20% in the district. Muslim make up around 7% of the population.

== Administrative divisions ==
The district is divided into Bapatla, Chirala and Repalle, which are further subdivided into a total of 20 mandals.

=== Mandals ===
The list of 20 mandals in Bapatla district, divided into 3 revenue divisions, is given below.

1. Bapatla revenue division
  1. Bapatla
  2. Karlapalem
  3. Martur
  4. Parchur
  5. Pittalavanipalem
  6. Yeddanapudi
2. Chirala revenue division
  1. Chinaganjam
  2. Chirala
  3. Inkollu
  4. Karamchedu
  5. Vetapalem
3. Repalle revenue division
  1. Amruthalur
  2. Bhattiprolu
  3. Cherukupalle
  4. Kollur
  5. Nagaram
  6. Nizampatnam
  7. Repalle
  8. Tsunduru
  9. Vemuru

== Cities and towns ==
Municipal Bodies in Bapatla District
Ciy/Town	Civil status	Revenue Division	Population
Chirala	Municipality	Chirala	1,62,471
Bapatla	Municipality	Bapatla	70,777
Repalle	Municipality	Repalle	50,866
Martur	Nagar Panchayat	Bapatla	21,434
Inkollu	Nagar Panchayat	Chirala	17,585
Parchur	Nagar Panchayat	Bapatla	13,375

== Politics ==
The district forms part of Bapatla Lok Sabha constituency and has five assembly constituencies.

Constituency number	Name	Reserved for (SC/ST/None)	Parliament
89	Vemuru	SC	Bapatla
90	Repalle	None	Bapatla
92	Bapatla	None	Bapatla
104	Parchur	None	Bapatla
106	Chirala	None	Bapatla

== Economy ==
Agriculture contributes to major share of gross district domestic product. Agriculture and allied services based industries such as cotton spinning mills, oil mills and shrimp processing are present in the district

=== Irrigation ===
- Krishna western delta is a major irrigation project Tanks, Tube Wells, Dug Wells, Lift

Irrigation are other sources of irrigation.

== Education ==
The first agricultural College in South India was started on 11 July 1945 in Bapatla by the Government of Composite Madras State India. It became part of Acharya N. G. Ranga Agricultural University, Andhra Pradesh in 1964.

== Military institutions ==
Airforce station at Suryalanka of Southern Air Command is a major defence establishment in the district. It has carried out Emergency Landing Facility trials on National Highway 16 near Addanki on 29 Dec 2022.

== Tourism ==
Baptla district tourist places (After zoom, move mouse to get more details)

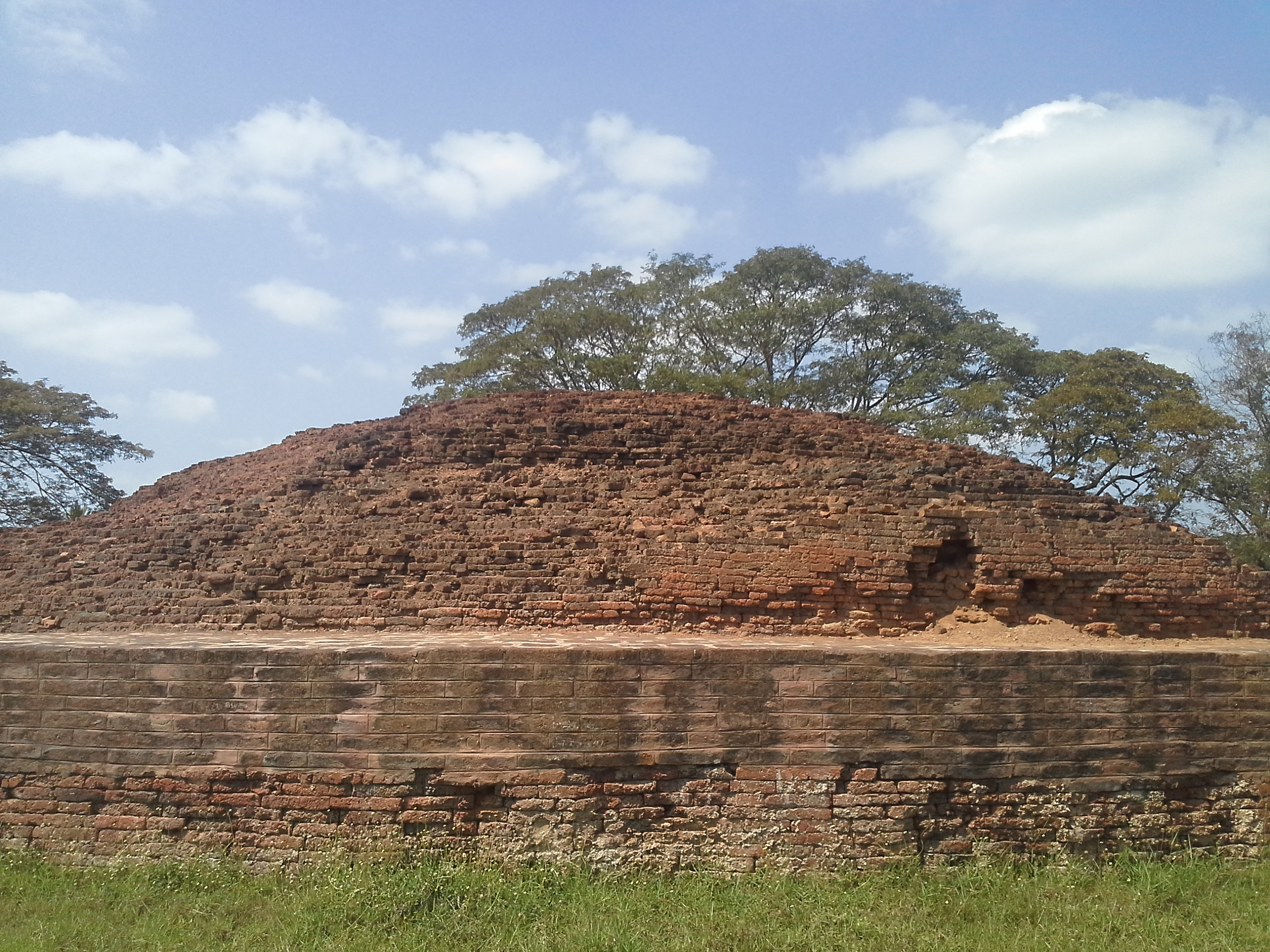
Stupa at Bhattiprolu

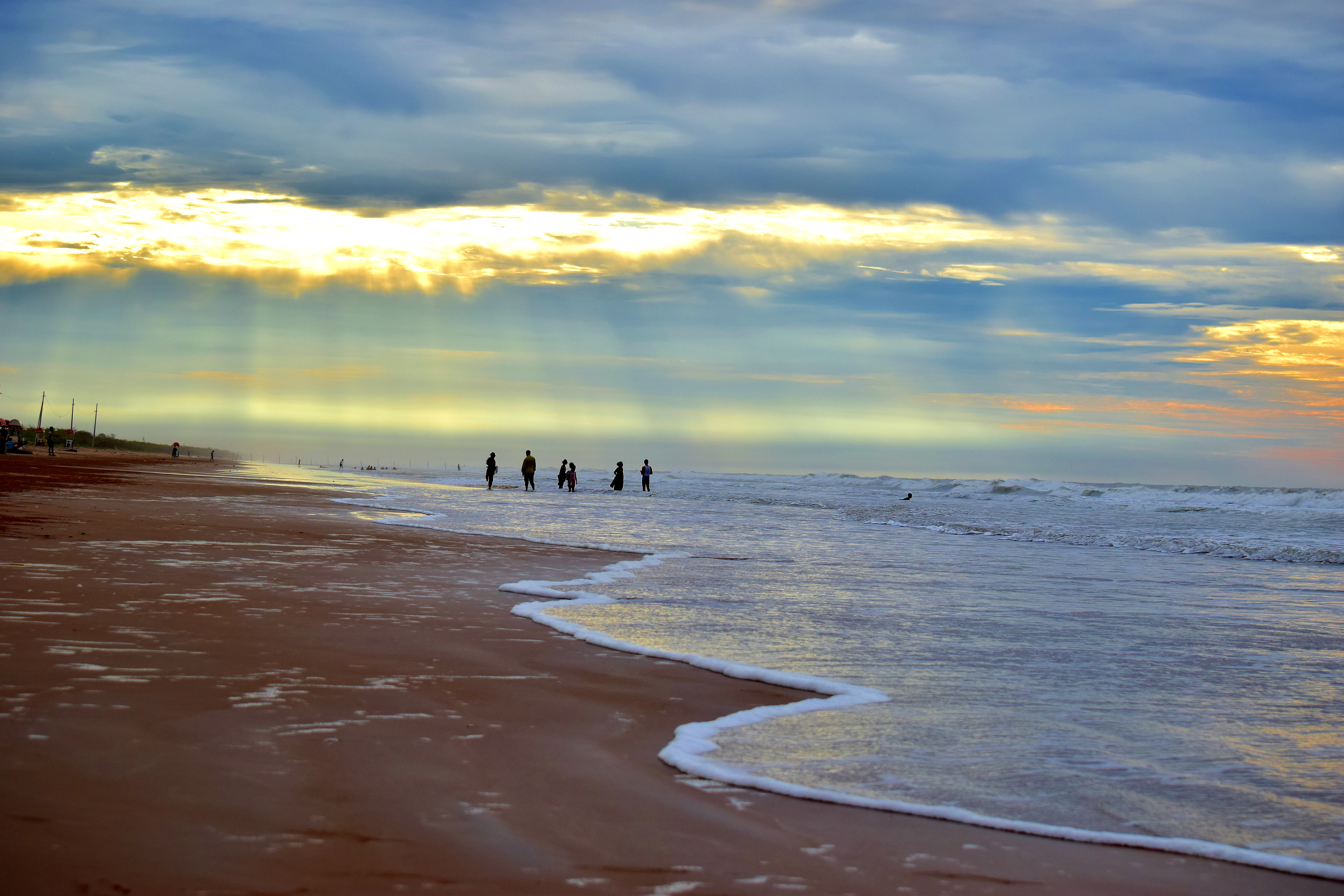
Sunrise at Suryalanka Beach

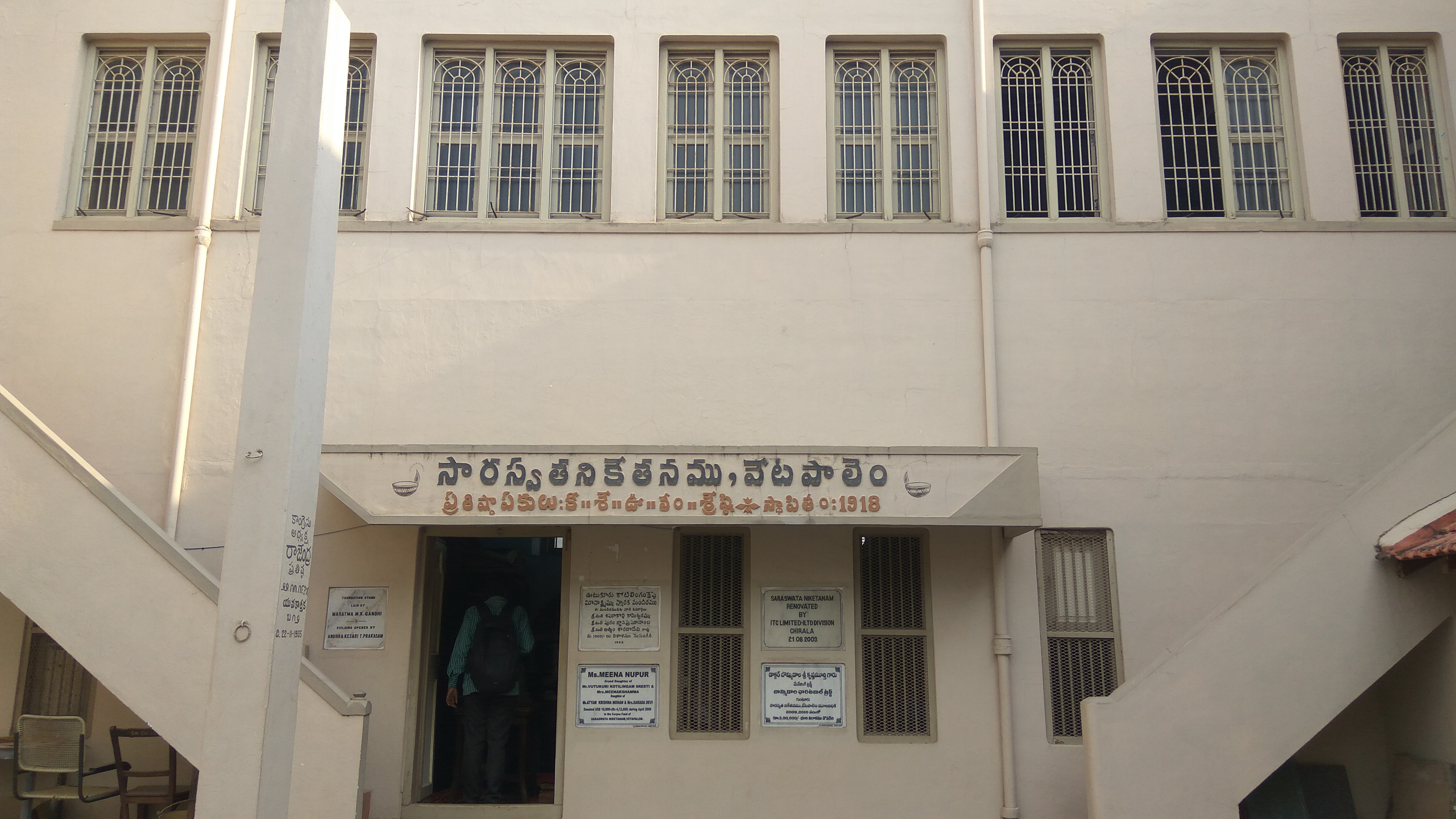
Saraswata Niketanam at Vetapalem

Bhavanarayana Swamy Temple in Bapatla is a 5th Century CE temple dedicated to Ksheera Bhavanarayanaswamy and Sundaravalli. This temple is under the administration control of Archaeological Survey of India. Chariot procession and other festivals are celebrated.

One of the earliest evidence of Brahmi script, origin of most scripts in India, is written on an urn containing Buddha's relics placed in the Stupa of Bhattiprolu. The script has been named Bhattiprolu script.

Saraswata Niketanam at Vetapalem is a library founded in 1918. It is known for its large collection of palm leaf manuscripts, newspapers and books.

=== Beaches ===
Nallamada, East Tungabhadra, Gundamthippa, Romperu(right) rivers meet the sea at Kappalavaripalem, Pinniboyinavaripalem. Suryalanka beach, about 9 km from Bapatla is suitable for sea bathing. Vadarevu and Ramapuram beaches near Chirala are also popular tourist attractions.

== Notable people ==
Kasinadhuni Viswanath who won the prestigious Dadasaheb Phalke Award for his contribution to films as director, screenwriter, lyricist and actor hails from Repalle. D. Ramanaidu, Guinness Book of World Records holder for the most films produced by an individual hailed from Karamchedu near Chirala. Pawan Kalyan born in Bapatla is a famous film actor and founder of Jana Sena Party. Daggubati Venkatesh known as Victory Venkatesh a notable Telugu actor hailed from Karamchedu. Pullela Gopichand former Indian Badminton player and title holder of All England Open Badminton Championships winner hails from Nagandla village of Inkollu Nagar Panchayat.

Konijeti Rosaiah elected as MLA of Chirala assembly constituency several times rose to become Chief Minister of Andhra Pradesh and Governor of Tamil Nadu. Kona Prabhakara Rao represented Bapatla assembly constituency several times and served as Andhra Pradesh Assembly Speaker, State Minister and Governor.
