= Pedapudi, Krishna district =

Pedapudi
- Village
- Interactive map of Pedapudi
- Location in Andhra Pradesh, India
- Country: India
- State: Andhra Pradesh
- District: Krishna

Area
  - Total: 2.14 km^{2} (0.83 sq mi)

Population (2011)
  - Total: 3,264
  - Density: 1,530/km^{2} (3,950/sq mi)

Languages
  - Official: Telugu
- Time zone: UTC+5:30 (IST)
- Vehicle registration: AP

Pedapudi is a village in Krishna district of the Indian state of Andhra Pradesh. It is located in Movva mandal of Machilipatnam revenue division. It is one of the villages in the mandal to be a part of Andhra Pradesh Capital Region.
