= Avanigadda mandal =

- Mandal
- Interactive map of Avanigadda mandal
- Location in Andhra Pradesh, India
- Country: India
- State: Andhra Pradesh
- District: Krishna
- Headquarters: Avanigadda

Area
  - Total: 80.08 km^{2} (30.92 sq mi)

Population (2011)
  - Total: 40,986
  - Density: 511.8/km^{2} (1,326/sq mi)

Languages
  - Official: Telugu
- Time zone: UTC+5:30 (IST)

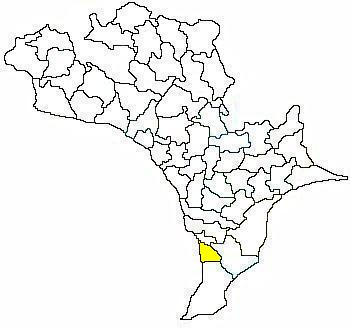
Mandal map of Krishna district showing Avanigadda mandal (in yellow)

Avanigadda mandal is one of the 25 mandals in Krishna district of the Indian state of Andhra Pradesh. It is under the administration of Machilipatnam revenue division and the headquarters are located at Avanigadda. The mandal is bounded by Mopidevi, Koduru and Nagayalanka mandals.

== Towns and villages ==
As of 2011 census, the mandal has 7 settlements and all are villages.

The settlements in the mandal are listed below:

1. Aswaraopalem
2. Avanigadda †
3. Chiruvolu Lanka
4. Edlanka
5. Modumudi
6. Puligadda
7. Vekanuru

Note: M-Municipality, †–Mandal headquarter

== See also ==
- List of villages in Krishna district
