= Gudapadu =

- Village
- Interactive map of Gudapadu
- Location in Andhra Pradesh Gudapadu (India)
- Coordinates: 16.222°N 80.901°E
- Country: India
- State: Andhra Pradesh
- District: Krishna

Area
  - Total: 3.20 km^{2} (1.24 sq mi)

Population (2011)
  - Total: 1,131
  - Density: 353/km^{2} (915/sq mi)

Languages
  - Official: Telugu
- Time zone: UTC+5:30 (IST)
- PIN: 521135
- Telephone code: 08671
- Vehicle registration: AP–16

Gudapadu is a village in Krishna district of the Indian state of Andhra Pradesh. It is located in Movva mandal of Machilipatnam revenue division. It is one of the villages in the mandal to be a part of Andhra Pradesh Capital Region.

== See also ==
- Villages in Movva mandal
