= Avanigadda =

Avanigadda అవనిగడ్డ
- Village
- Interactive map of Avanigadda
- Location in Andhra Pradesh, India
- Coordinates: 16°1′11″N 80°55′12″E
- Country: India
- State: Andhra Pradesh
- District: Krishna
- Mandal: Avanigadda

Government
  - Type: Gram Panchayat
  - Body: Avanigadda Gram panchayat
  - MLA: Mandali Buddha Prasad
  - MP: Vallabhaneni Balashowry

Area
  - Total: 13.39 km^{2} (5.17 sq mi)
- Elevation: 57 m (187 ft)

Population (2011)
  - Total: 23,737
  - Density: 1,773/km^{2} (4,591/sq mi)

Languages
  - Official: Telugu
- Time zone: UTC+5:30 (IST)
- Postal code: 521121
- Area code: +91-08671
- Lok Sabha constituency: Machilipatnam

Avanigadda is a village in Krishna district of the Indian state of Andhra Pradesh. It is the mandal headquarters of Avanigadda mandal in Machilipatnam revenue division.

This area compromises the old area of Diviseema.

== Geography ==
Avanigadda is located on the banks of the Krishna River. It is located 30 km away from the delta of Krishna River and Bay of Bengal.

=== Climate ===
Due to its proximity to the Bay of Bengal, Avanigadda and its surrounding villages are prone to cyclones and floods. It is devastated by 1977 Andhra Pradesh cyclone which had a velocity over 200 kmph. A memorial, at the point of furthest advance of the Storm surge was built near this village in memory of the people who died in the storm.

== Culture and tourism ==
The main religious destinations in town are temples such as Sri Addanki Nancharamma Temple at Viswanadhapalli, Sri Lankamma Ammavari Temple and Sri Lakshmi Narayana Swamy Temple.

Other tourism attractions are Penumudi–Puligadda Bridge, Srikakulam Srikakulandhra Vishnu Temple, Mopidevi Sri Subrahmanyeswara Swamy Temple and Hamasaladeevi beach.

== Politics ==
Buddha Prasad Mandali, who was also MLA of Avanigadda Andhra Pradesh Assembly in JSP government, has won over Simhadri Ramesh Babu in 2024 elections.

== Transport ==
Repalle is the nearest town from Avanigadda which is 10 km away. State-run APS RTC has a bus depot in this village and runs buses to nearest towns and Vijayawada, Visakhapatnam and Hyderabad, among other places. APS RTC runs Palle Velugu, Express, Deluxe, Super Luxury, Indra and Night Rider class of buses.

Private players also run their services from Avanigadda to major cities, and compete with the state run APSRTC, by plying buses to the places where the state-run transport corporation does not. Although the town lacks direct rail connectivity, it is still a popular choice of transport. The nearest railway station (Repalle railway station) lies 10 km away, in Repalle.

== Gallery ==
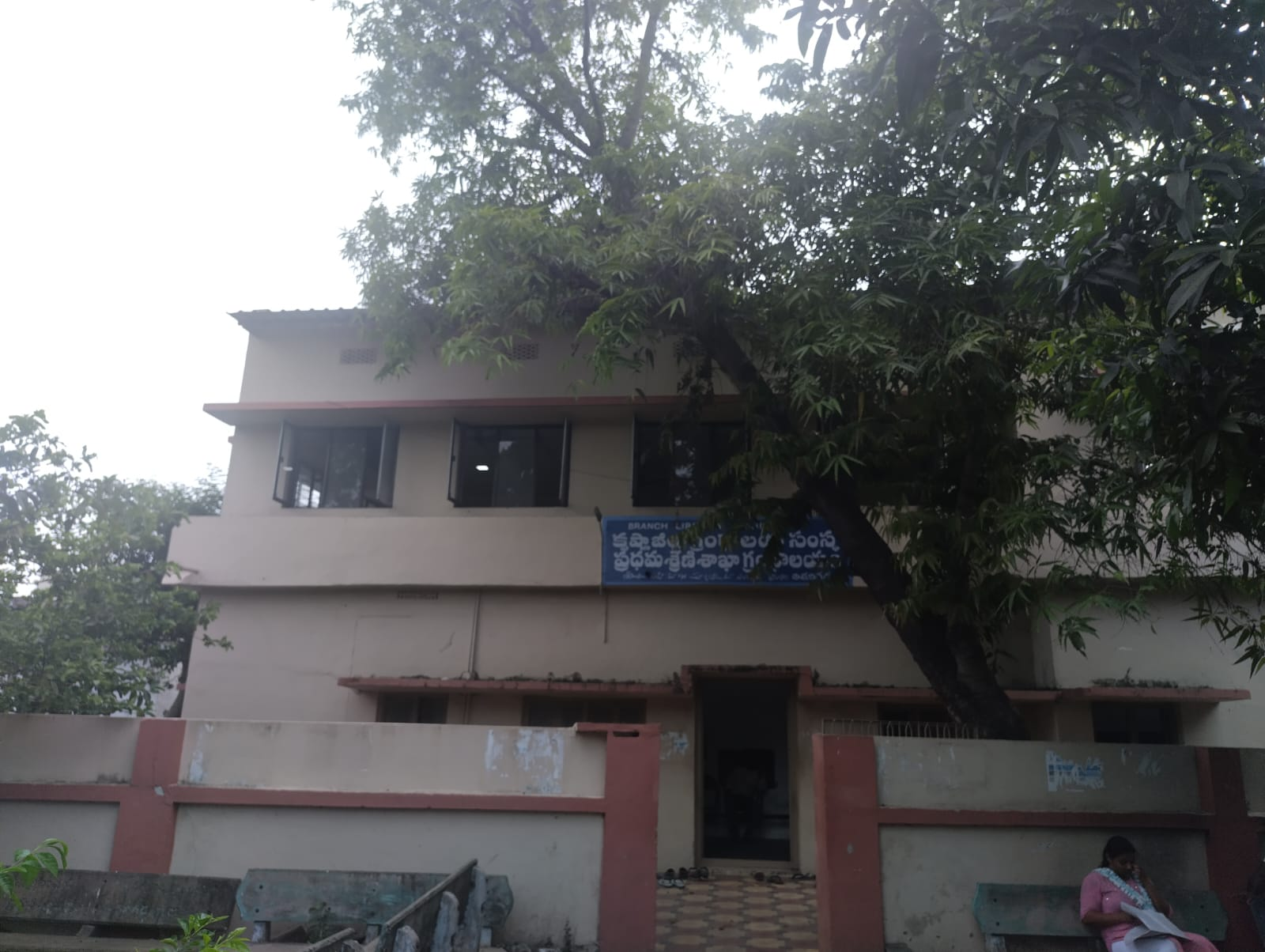
Library in Avanigadda

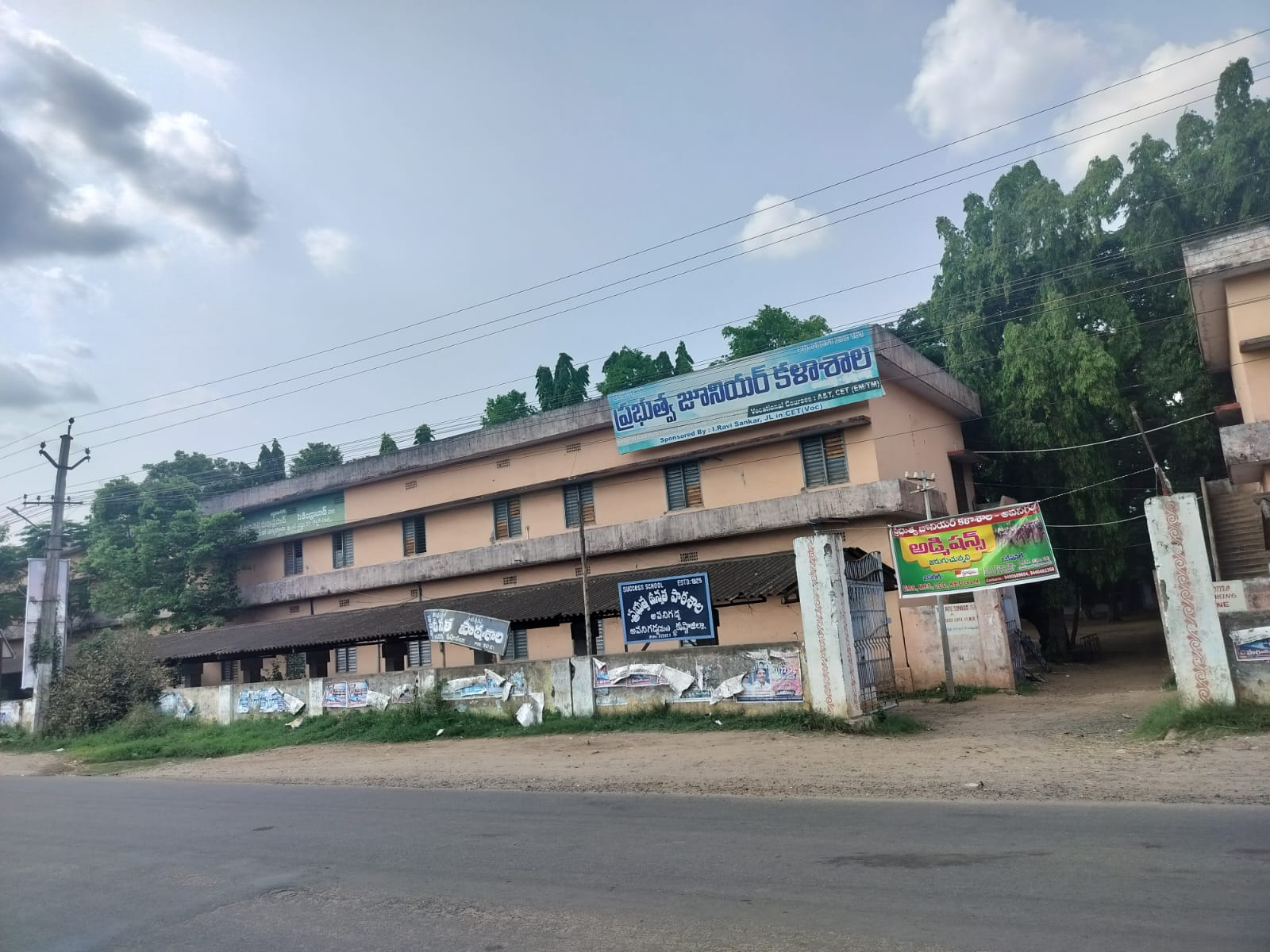
Govt Junior College in Avanigadda

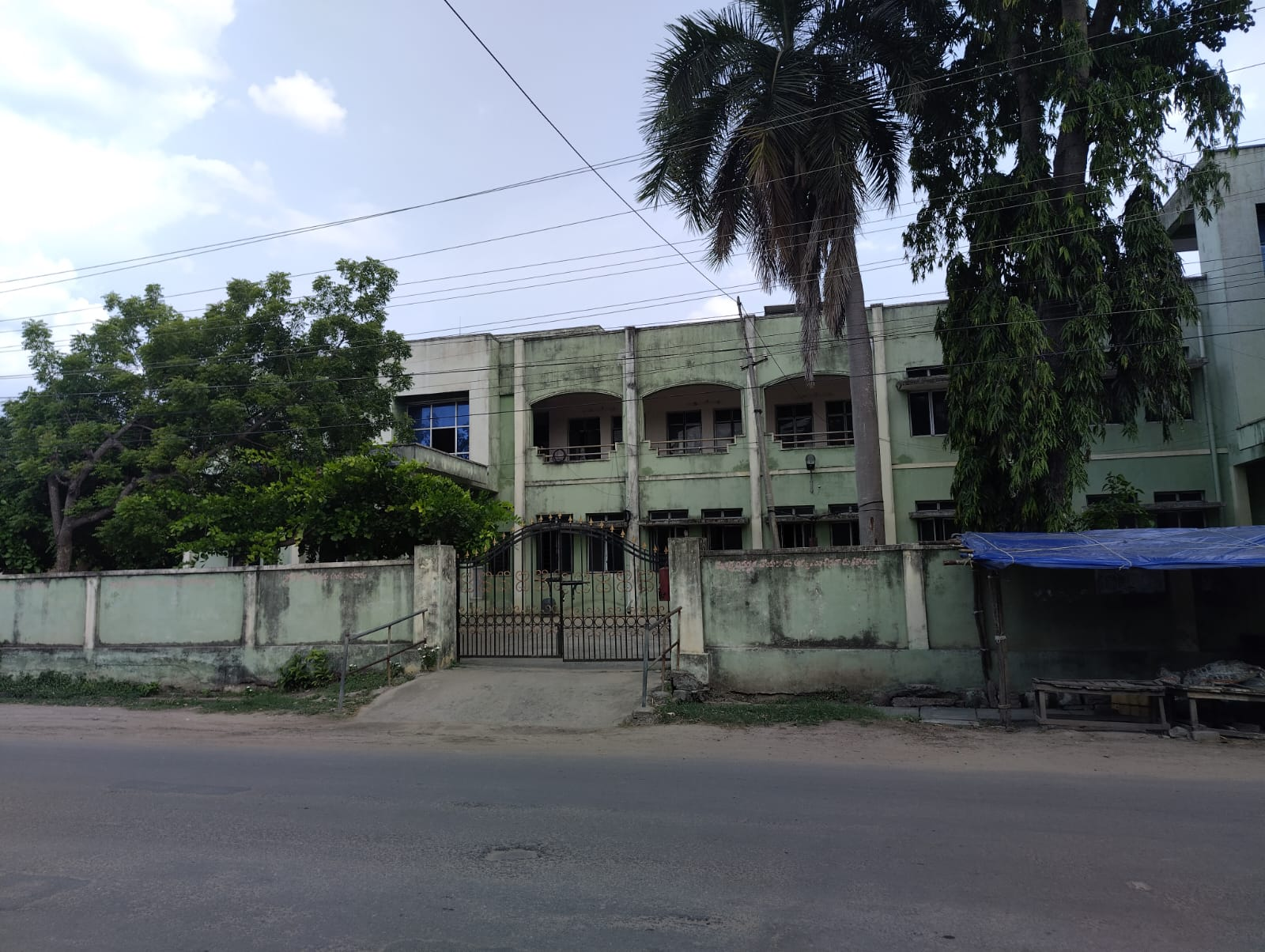
Court in Avanigadda

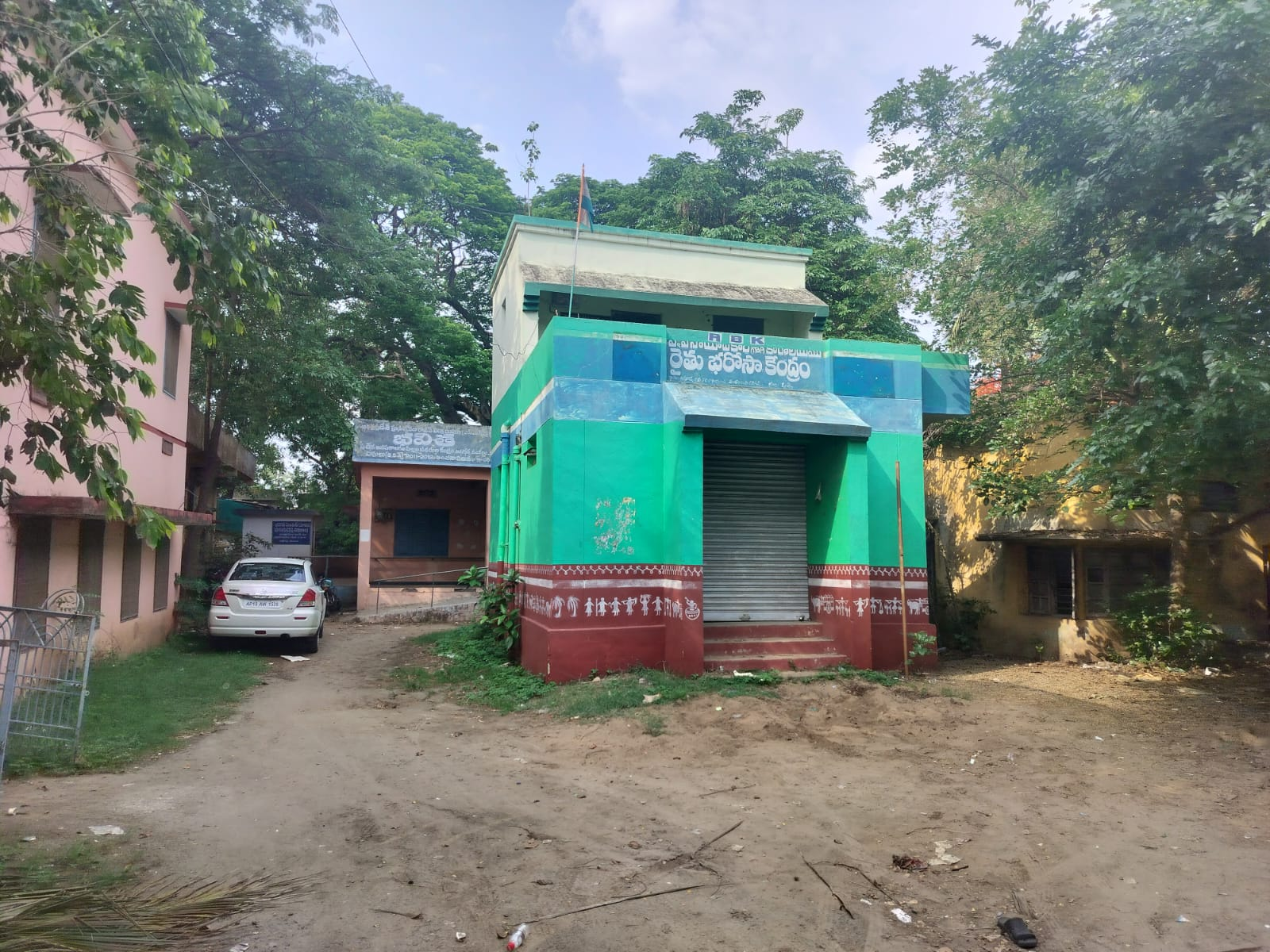
Office of Raitu Barosa Kendram

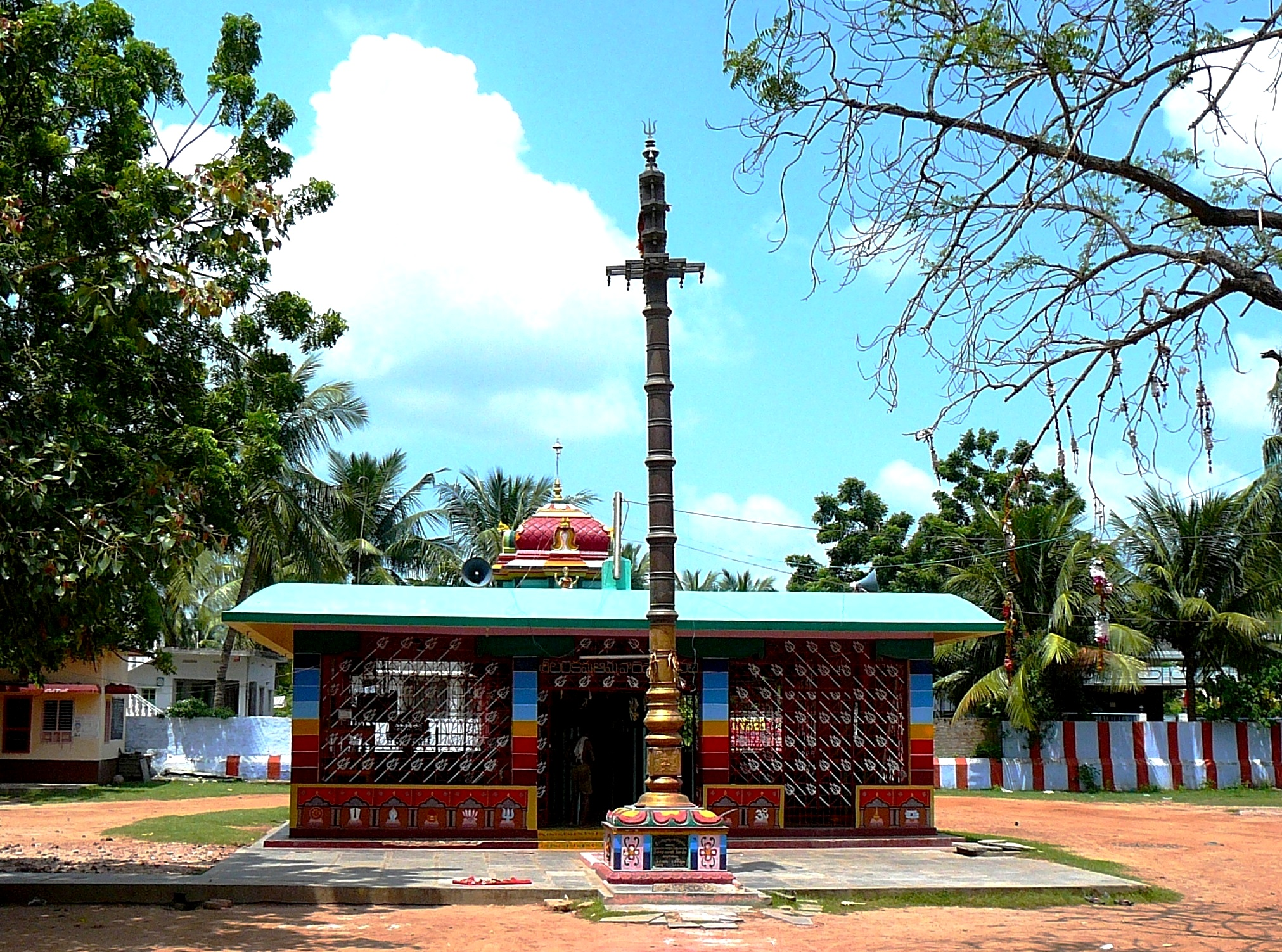
Holy Goddess Sri Lankamma Ammavari Temple at Avanigadda

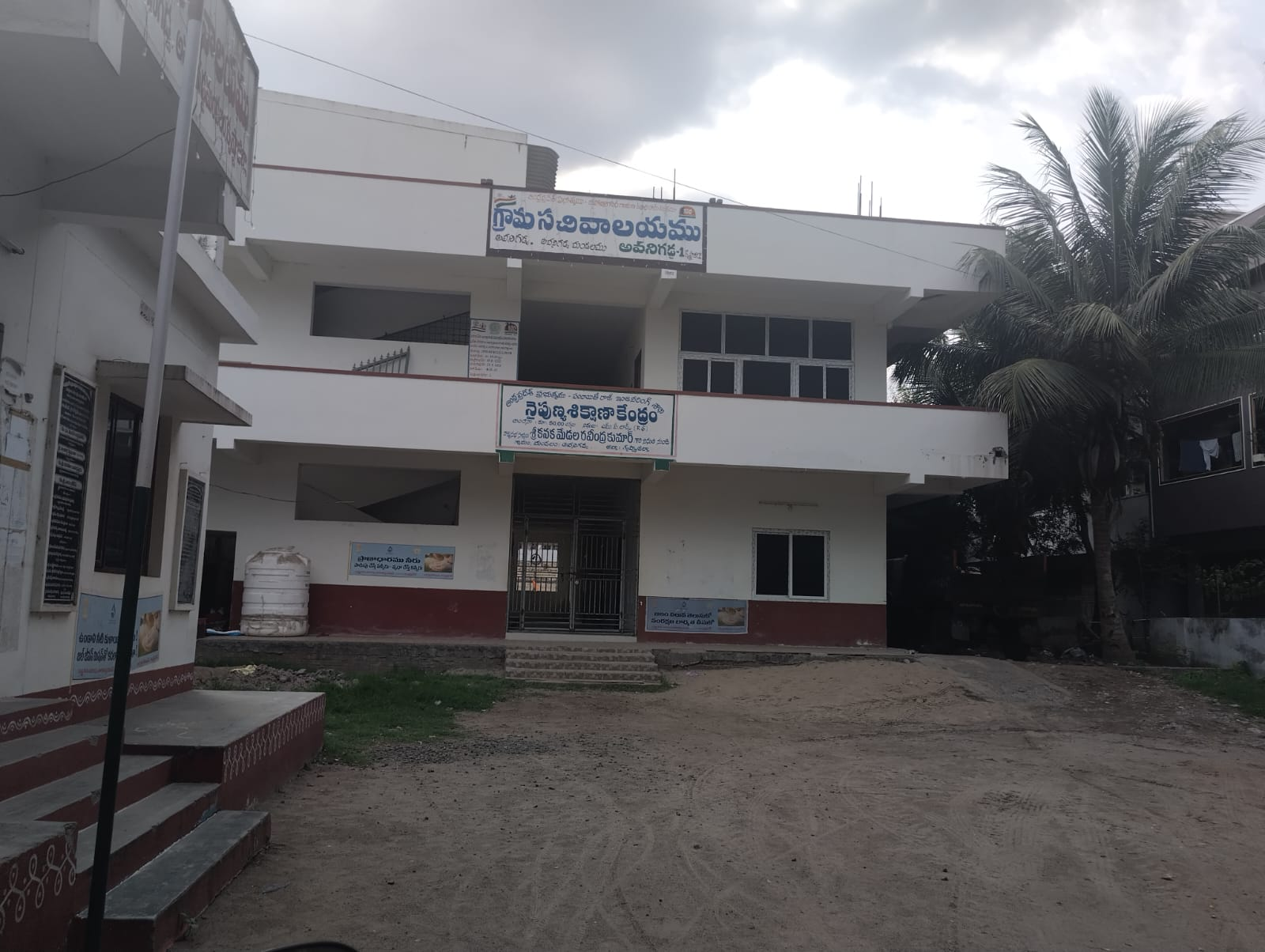
Sachivalayam and Skill Center

== See also ==
- Villages in Avanigadda mandal
