= Koduru, Krishna district =

Koduru కోడూరు
- Village
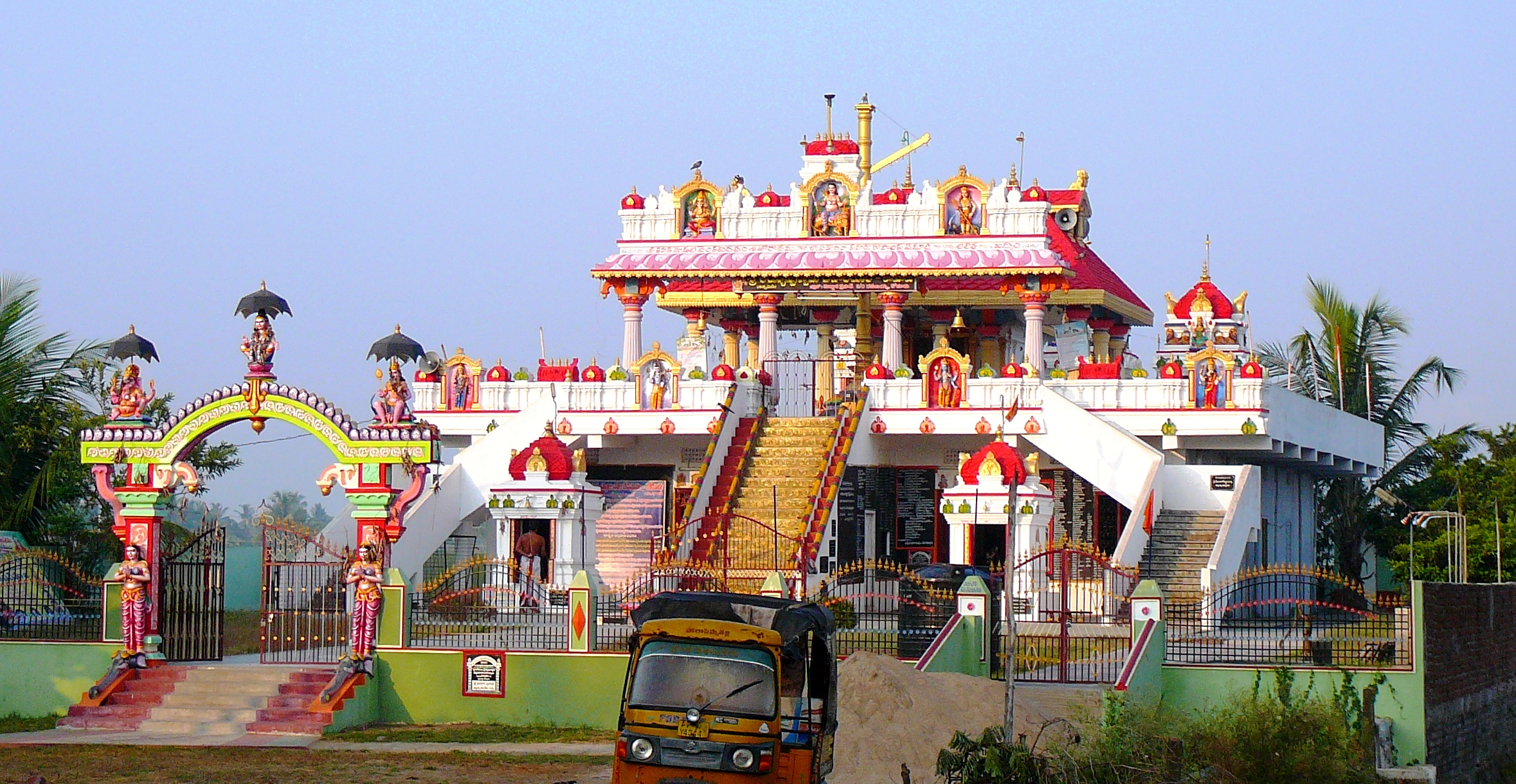
- Ayyappa Swamy Temple
- Interactive map of Koduru
- Location in Andhra Pradesh, India
- Coordinates: 16°00′08″N 81°02′30″E
- Country: India
- State: Andhra Pradesh
- District: Krishna
- Mandal: Koduru

Government
  - Type: Gram panchayat

Area
  - Total: 35.33 km^{2} (13.64 sq mi)
- Elevation: 7 m (23 ft)

Population (2011)
  - Total: 20,000
  - Density: 570/km^{2} (1,500/sq mi)

Languages
  - Official: Telugu
- Time zone: UTC+5:30 (IST)
- PIN: 521 328
- Telephone code: +91–8671
- Vehicle registration: AP 16 U
- Website: www.koduru.com (under construction)

Koduru is a village in Krishna district of the Indian state of Andhra Pradesh. It is the Mandal headquarters of Koduru Mandal in Machilipatnam Revenue Division. Nearby villages are V. Kothapalem, Machavaram, Jayapuram.

== Demographics ==
The town had a population of approximately 6000 in the 2015 Census of India. The total population constituted 3,023 males and 2,977 females — a sex ratio of 987 females per 1000 males, higher than the national average of 940 per 1000. 1,252 children were in the age group of 0–6 years, of which 646 were boys and 606 were girls—a ratio of 938 per 1000. The literacy rate was 73.68% with approximately 4,000 literates, approximately equal to the national average of 73.00%.

Famous places nearby include "Sagara Sangam beach" and "Venu Gopala Swami Temple".

== See also ==
- Villages in Koduru mandal
