= Edlalanka =

Edlanka
- Village
- Interactive map of Edlanka
- Location in Andhra Pradesh, India Edlanka (India)
- Coordinates: 16°0′0″N 80°54′7″E
- Country: India
- State: Andhra Pradesh
- District: Krishna

Area
  - Total: 9.04 km^{2} (3.49 sq mi)
- Elevation: 57 m (187 ft)

Population (2011)
  - Total: 1,002
  - Density: 111/km^{2} (287/sq mi)

Languages
  - Official: Telugu
- Time zone: UTC+5:30 (IST)
- Postal code: 521121

Edlanka, also known as Yedlanka or Patha Edlanka, is a village in Avanigadda Mandal, Krishna district, Andhra Pradesh, India. Its pincode is 521121.

== Geography ==
Edlalanka, located at 16°0'20"N and 80°54'7"E, is an island in the Krishna river delta and is separated from Diviseema by Chinnaravuru. The village has no embankments or levees to protect itself from floods.

=== 2005 floods ===
Villages were evacuated during the 2005 floods.

=== 2009 floods and relief efforts ===
The flood in river Krishna submerged the entire island except for a few pockets. Most of the villagers were evacuated to Avanigadda, but in the process one of the boats overturned and two children lost their lives.

== Demographics ==
Edlanka Village Population Census (2005)

- Households: 256
- Total Population: 894
- Male Population: 426
- Female Population: 468
- Kids Under 6 Yrs: 134
- Boys under 6 Yrs: 50
- Girls Under 6 Yrs: 84
- Total Literates: 380
- Total Illiterates: 514

== Government ==
The village does not have proper facilities for portable drinking water. The village does not conform to ARWSP norms.

== Notable personalities ==
- Padmashree Myneni Hariprasada Rao (Scientist)
- Sharwanand (Actor)
