= Diviseema =

River island in india

Coordinates: 15.77°N 80.94°E

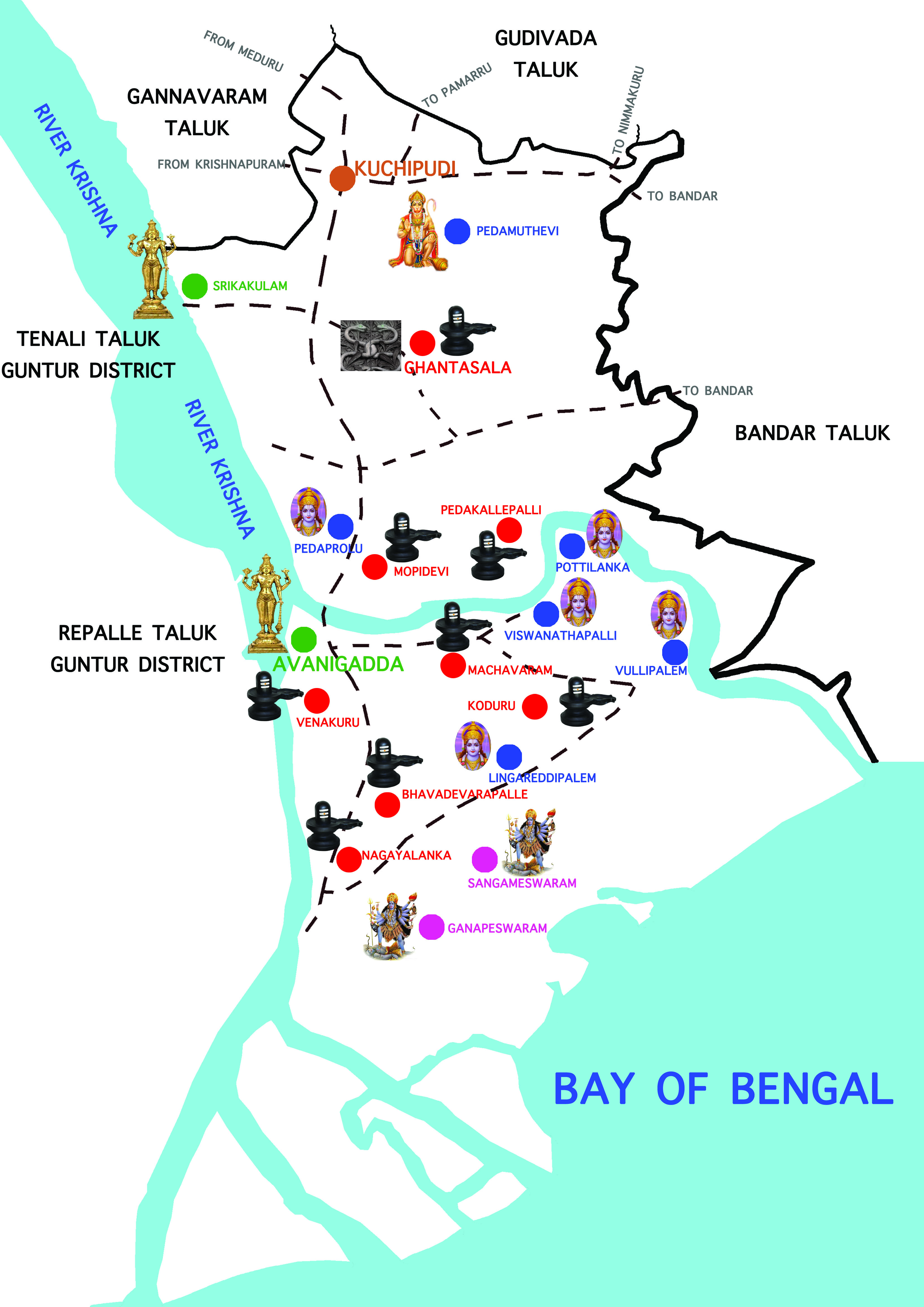
Map showing important temples in Divi Taluk

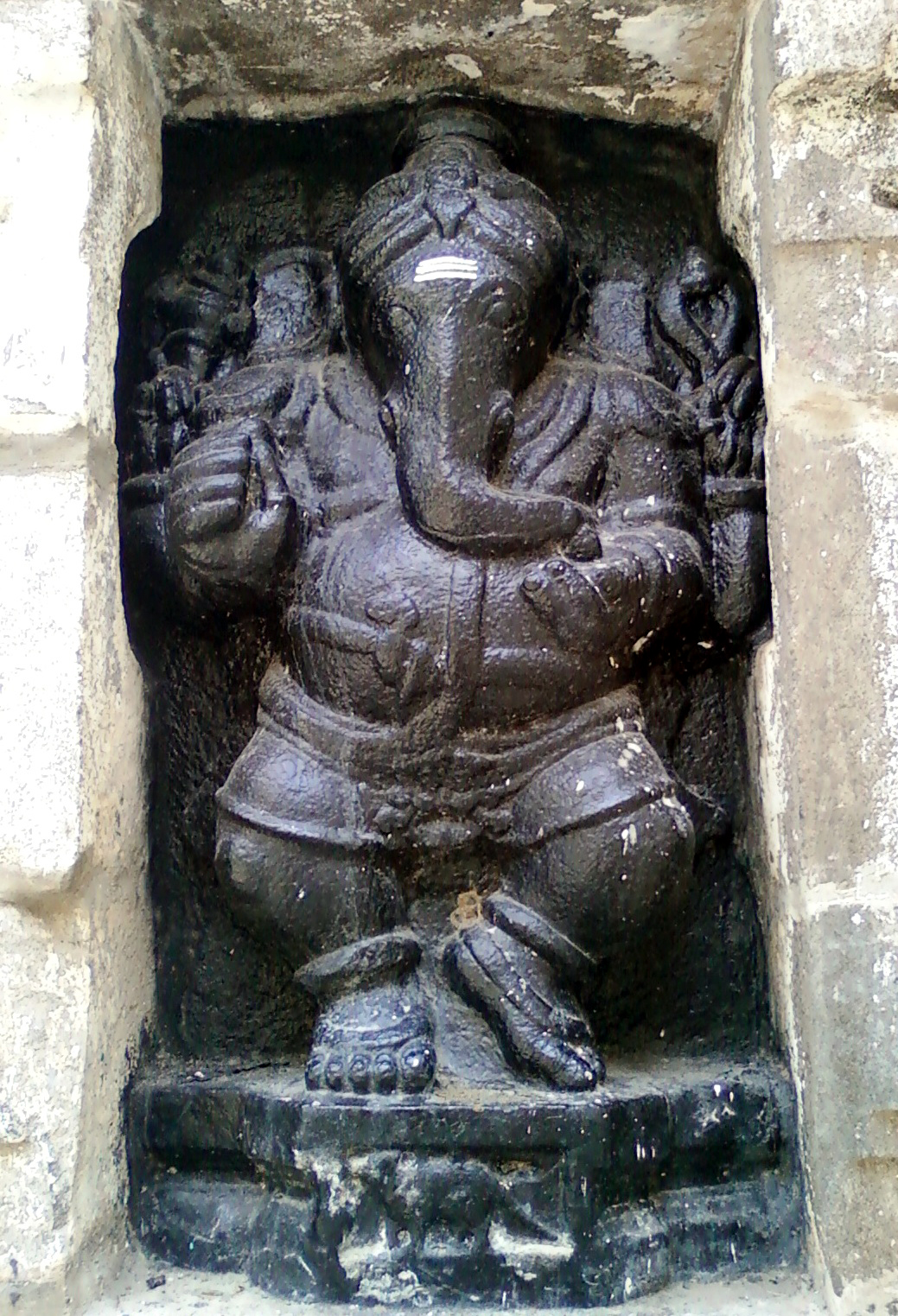
Ganesa stone carved Relief at Srikakula Andhra Mahavishnu Temple

Diviseema is a small and deltaic island in Krishna District of the Indian state of Andhra Pradesh. It comprises seven Mandals in total - Avanigadda, Challapalli, Mopidevi, Nagayalanka, Koduru, Ghantasala and Movva . Diviseema was also known as Divi Taluk in the past.

Avanigadda and Challapalli are the major towns in Diviseema. This area was formerly ruled by the Yarlagadda kings of Deverakota estate. Modern Day Diviseema area comes under Avanigadda Assembly constituency .

== Etymology ==
Diviseema is obtained from the two words Deevi meaning 'island' and seema meaning 'country' or 'region' in Telugu. Diviseema (pronounced as Deeviseema) means "Region of the Island". The famous Hamsaladeevi beach is present in Diviseema.

== Geography ==
Diviseema is located in the delta area formed at Puligadda (Avanigadda), where the Krishna River is divided into two before merging into the Bay of Bengal. One merges in Bay of Bengal at Hamsaladeevi (Koduru mandal) and the other near to Gullalamoda (Nagayalanka mandal).

It is a fertile low lying plain interspersed with Krishna river and its distributaries. It is irrigated by canal irrigation drawn from Prakasam Barrage at Vijayawada. The confluence of Krishna River and Bay of Bengal at Palakayatippa is a weekend getaway and also a pilgrimage center. Towards the sea, Diviseema has rich mangroves and is notified as Krishna Wildlife Sanctuary.

== Cyclone ==
The unprecedented loss of human life suffered during the 1977 Andhra Pradesh cyclone across this region on 19 November 1977. It is estimated that 10,000 people and 10,00,000 animals died as a result of this natural disaster. The survivors have recouped, due largely to voluntary organizations and governmental efforts.

== Notable people ==
- Yarlagadda Sivarama Prasad - Last ruler of Deverakota estate (Diviseema) and Mla of Avanigadda Assembly constituency till 1972
- Pingali Venkayya - National Flag designer
- Ghantasala (singer) - Famous musician
- Myneni Hariprasada Rao - Former director of NPCL, Padma Shri awardee and grandfather to actor Sharwanand
- Meka Srikanth- Senior Star actor
- Nani (actor) – Star Actor in Tollywood
- Sharwanand – Actor in Tollywood
- Mandali Venkata Krishna Rao - Famous mla and minister
- Simhadri Satyanarayana Rao - Famous mla and minister
- Mandali Buddha Prasad - Mla and Former Deputy Speaker
- Bondada Raghavendra Rao - Industrialist and founder of Bondada Engineering Ltd
