= Myneni =

Myneni (Telugu: మైనేని) is a Telugu surname notable people with the surname include:

- Myneni Hariprasada Rao (1927–2016), Indian engineer
- Myneni Saketh (born 1987), Indian tennis player known professionally as Saketh Myneni
- Myneni Sharwanand (born 1984), Indian actor known professionally as Sharwanand
