= Majeru =

- Village
- Interactive map of Majeru
- Location within Andhra Pradesh
- Coordinates: 16.137°N 81.007°E
- Country: India
- State: Andhra Pradesh
- District: Krishna district
- Mandal: Challapalli
- Elevation: 811 m (2,661 ft)
- Time zone: UTC+5.30 (IST)
- Post code: 521131

Majeru is a village in Challapalli mandal in Krishna District, Andhra Pradesh, India.

Majeru's assigned post office is in Lakshmipuram (Krishna).
