= Modumudi =

- Village
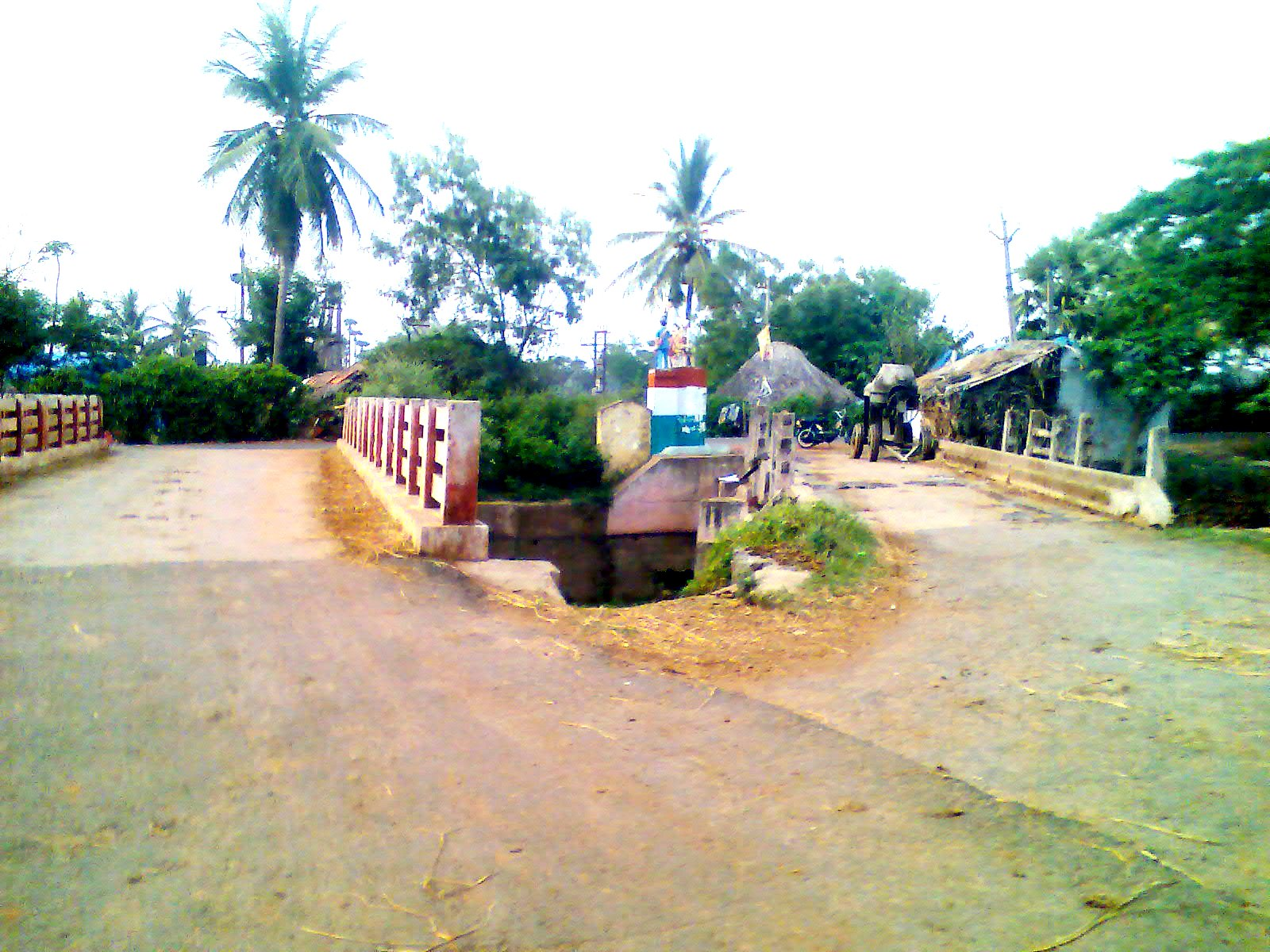
- Interactive map of Modumudi
- Location in Andhra Pradesh, India
- Coordinates: 16°0′0″N 80°54′7″E
- Country: India
- State: Andhra Pradesh
- District: Krishna
- Mandal: Avanigadda

Government
  - Type: Panchayat Raj
  - Body: Gram panchayat
  - MLA: Mandali Buddha Prasad
  - MP: Vallabhaneni Balashowry

Area
  - Total: 13.76 km^{2} (5.31 sq mi)
- Elevation: 11 m (36 ft)

Population (2011)
  - Total: 4,256
  - Density: 309.3/km^{2} (801.1/sq mi)

Languages
  - Official: Telugu
- Time zone: UTC+5:30 (IST)
- PIN: 521121
- Area code: +91-8671
- Lok Sabha constituency: Machilipatnam

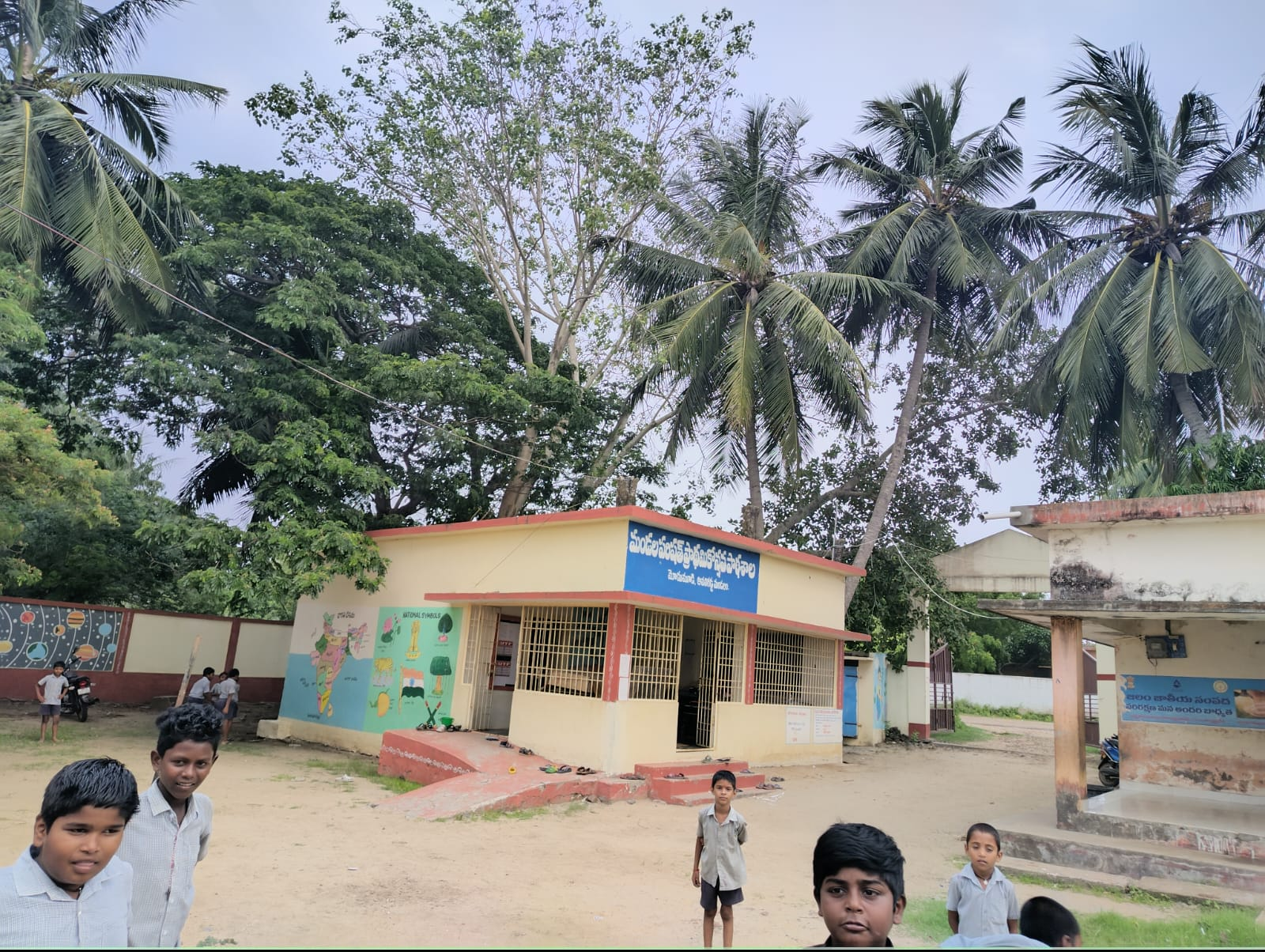
MPUP School in Modumudi.

Modumudi is a village in the Krishna district of Indian state of Andhra Pradesh. It is located in Avanigadda mandal of Machilipatnam revenue division.

== Demographics ==
As of 2011 Census of India, Modumudi had a population of 4256 with 2490 households. The total population constitute, 2127 males and 2129 females with a sex ratio of 1001 females per 1000 males. 340 children are in the age group of 0–6 years, with a sex ratio of 969 per 1000. Child population constitute 7.99% of the total population. The average literacy rate stands at 73.32%, significantly higher than the state average of 67.41%.
