= Gurazada =

- Village
- Interactive map of Gurazada
- Location in Andhra Pradesh, India Gurazada (India)
- Coordinates: 16.37836°N 80.8728°E
- Country: India
- State: Andhra Pradesh
- District: Krishna
- Mandal: Pamidimukkala

Area
  - Total: 4.52 km^{2} (1.75 sq mi)

Population (2011)
  - Total: 1,970
  - Density: 436/km^{2} (1,130/sq mi)
  - Summer (DST): GMT+5.30 HOURS
- Postal code: 521256

Gurazada (or Gurajada) is a village in Krishna district of the Indian state of Andhra Pradesh. It is located in Pamidimukkala mandal of Nuzvid revenue division. It is famous for the ancestors of the poet Gurazada Apparao
