= Myneni Hariprasada Rao =

Indian civil servant

- Born: 21 July 1927, Edlalanka
- Awards: Padma Shri (1984); Sanjay Gandhi Award

Myneni Hariprasada Rao, (Edlalanka, 21 July 1927 – 5 April 2016) was a retired Director of the Nuclear Power Board (now known as NPCL) of the DAE, Mumbai, India. He served for many years as a member of Southern, Western and Northern Indian Regional electricity boards.

Rao was considered as the architect of the Madras Atomic Power Station (MAPS) and its first project director. He has done lot of service to the people of Diviseema. His grandson Sharwanand is an actor in Tollywood.

== Biography ==
Rao had a master's degree in Power Systems Engineering from the Illinois Institute of Technology.

== Awards ==
During his career, MHP Rao received several awards, including the Padma Shri (1984) and the Sanjay Gandhi Award for contribution in Science and Technology (1983).

== Social service ==
Through his YEMKAY trust, he has conducted free homeopathy clinics in Avanigadda, Edlalanka, Mynenivaripalem, Challapalli, repalle and Gudivada.

The recent spate of floods from the Krishna River has left the village of Edlalanka submerged. Flood relief efforts under his direction are underway to restore proper drinking water and medicines to the villagers.
