= 1977 Andhra Pradesh cyclone =

1977 weather event

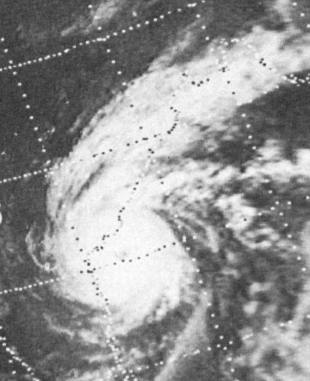
- Satellite image of the storm on 19 November, prior to making landfall in Andhra Pradesh

Meteorological history
- Formed: 14 November 1977
- Remnant low: 20 November 1977
- Dissipated: 21 November 1977

Super cyclonic storm
- 3-minute sustained (IMD)
- Highest winds: 230 km/h (145 mph)
- Lowest pressure: 943 hPa (mbar); 27.85 inHg

Category 3-equivalent tropical cyclone
- 1-minute sustained (SSHWS/JTWC)
- Highest winds: 205 km/h (125 mph)

Overall effects
- Fatalities: 10,000 (official); Estimated up to 50,000
- Damage: $196 million (1977 USD)
- Areas affected: Andhra Pradesh
- IBTrACS
- Part of the 1977 North Indian Ocean cyclone season

The 1977 Andhra Pradesh cyclone was a devastating tropical cyclone that hit Andhra Pradesh in November 1977, killing at least 10,000 people. The worst affected areas were in the Krishna River delta region. The island of Diviseema, which was hit by a seven-metre-high (23-foot) storm surge, experienced a loss of life running into the thousands. The large loss of life prompted the establishment of early warning meteorological stations on the coast of Andhra Pradesh. Cyclone shelters and other measures for disaster management were also taken. A memorial, at the point of furthest advance of the tidal wave, near the town of Avanigadda, was built in memory of the people who died in the storm.

== Meteorological history ==
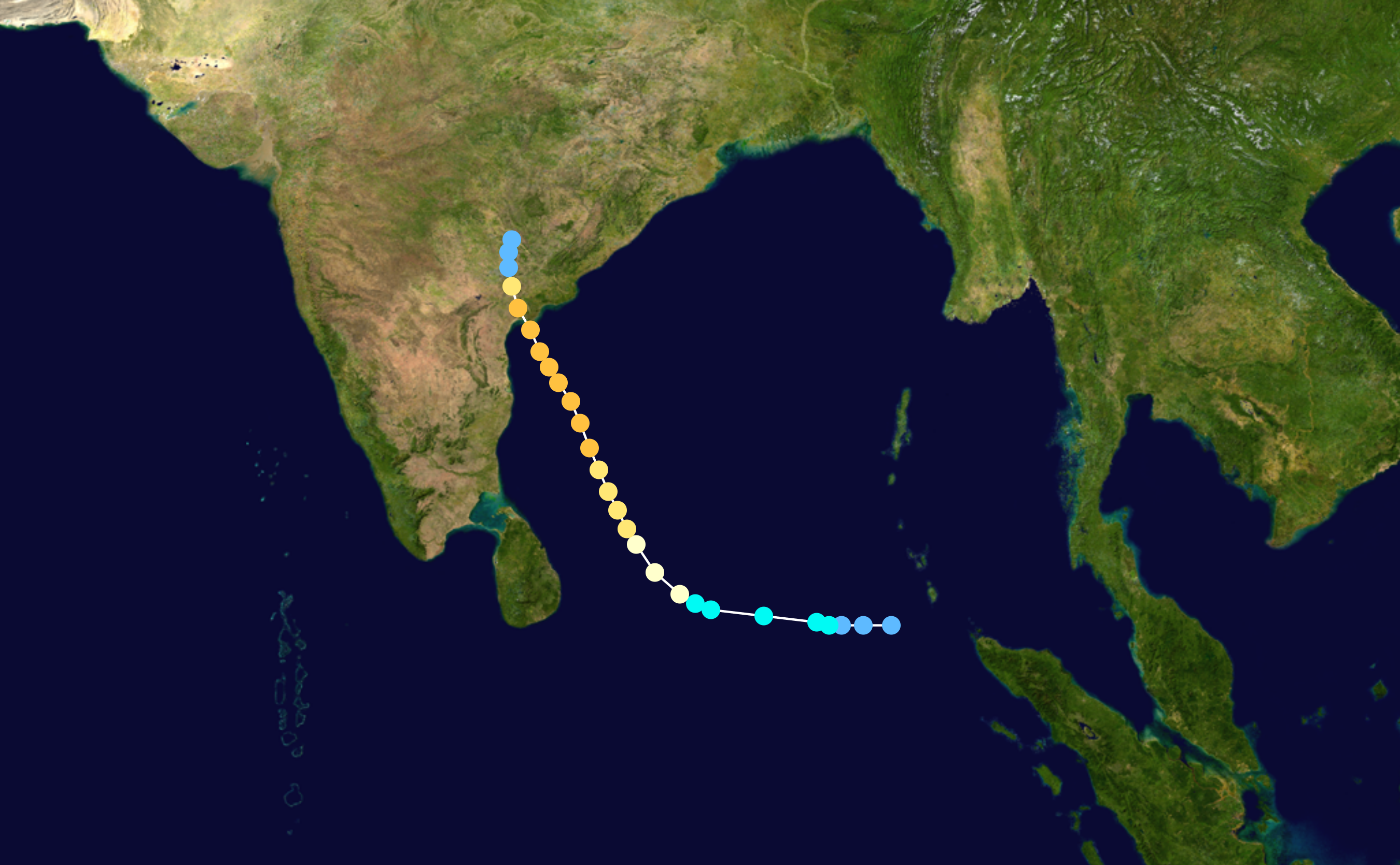
Map plotting the storm's track and intensity, according to the Saffir–Simpson scale Map key Saffir–Simpson scale Tropical depression (≤38 mph, ≤62 km/h) Tropical storm (39–73 mph, 63–118 km/h) Category 1 (74–95 mph, 119–153 km/h) Category 2 (96–110 mph, 154–177 km/h) Category 3 (111–129 mph, 178–208 km/h) Category 4 (130–156 mph, 209–251 km/h) Category 5 (≥157 mph, ≥252 km/h) Unknown Storm type Tropical cyclone Subtropical cyclone Extratropical cyclone, remnant low, tropical disturbance, or monsoon depression

The origins of the 1977 Andhra Pradesh cyclone can be traced to a weak tropical disturbance which was first noted on satellite imagery on the morning of 14 November while located roughly 520 km (320 mi) southwest of the Nicobar Islands. (Note: All dates are based on Coordinated Universal Time unless otherwise noted.) Traveling due west at 25 km/h (16 mph) along the southern periphery of the mid-tropospheric subtropical ridge, the disturbance steadily organized, with increased banding noted on satellite imagery. This increase in organization prompted the India Meteorological Department (IMD) to report that the disturbance had intensified into a deep depression later that morning, (Note: The India Meteorological Department is the official Regional Specialized Meteorological Center for the northern Indian Ocean.) and the Joint Typhoon Warning Center (JTWC) to issue a Tropical Cyclone Formation Alert for the system at 13:10 UTC that afternoon. (Note: The Joint Typhoon Warning Center is a joint United States Navy – United States Air Force task force that issues tropical cyclone warnings for the western Pacific Ocean and other regions.) At 08:00 UTC on 15 November, the JTWC issued its first advisory on the system as satellite data indicated that the storm had continued to strengthen, with estimated one-minute sustained wind speeds of 75 km/h (47 mph).

While the system was initially developing, an upper tropospheric trough had formed over northern and central India and produced a break in the subtropical ridge. As the storm traveled towards this break in the ridge on 15 November, the mid-tropospheric anticyclone over the system weakened, reducing the storm's steering flow and causing the system to slow to a 7 km/h (4.3 mph) northwestwards movement. In addition, the divergent southwesterly flow produced by the trough resulted in the system beginning a period of rapid intensification. Early on 16 November, the system intensified into a Category 1-equivalent tropical cyclone on the Saffir-Simpson Hurricane Scale; an eye was observed on satellite imagery later that morning.

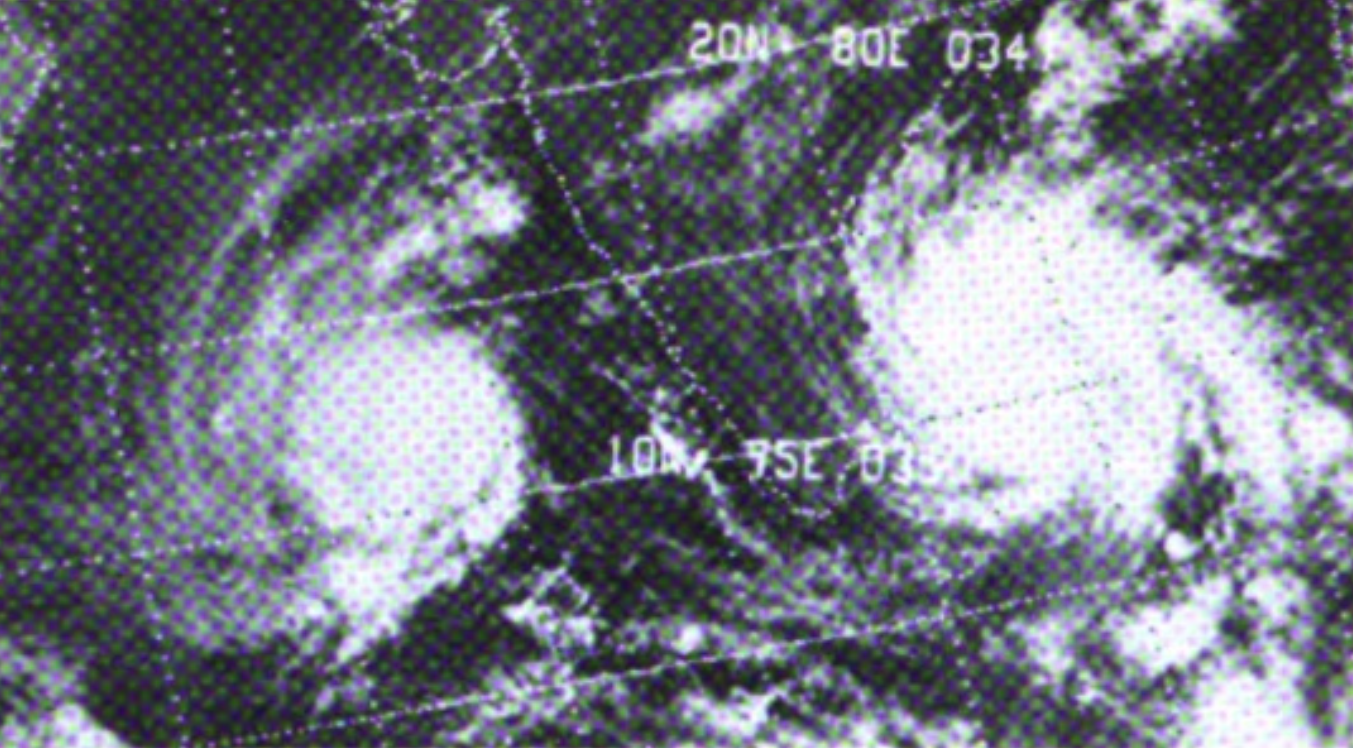
The cyclone alongside 05B on 17 November

For the next two days, the tropical cyclone continued to strengthen while traveling generally towards the north-northwest. During this time period, increased organization, such as tighter banding features and a progressively more distinct eye, were observed on satellite imagery. At 10:30 UTC on 17 November, the ship Jagatswami reported winds of 195 km/h (121 mph) and a minimum barometric pressure of 948 hPa (27.99 inHg) off the Indian coast. The next evening, the JTWC estimated that the system had attained its peak intensity as a Category 3-equivalent tropical cyclone, with one-minute sustained winds of 205 km/h (127 mph), while located roughly 140 km (87 mi) off the coast of Andhra Pradesh. Around this time, the IMD estimated that the system had three-minute sustained winds of 230 km/h (140 mph)—which would classify the system as a modern-day super cyclonic storm—and a minimum barometric pressure of 943 hPa (27.85 inHg).

As the cyclone approached the Indian coast, it accelerated to 17 km/h (11 mph) while slightly weakening from its peak intensity. The storm made landfall near Chirala, in the Prakasam district of central Andhra Pradesh, around 11:00 UTC on 19 November with one-minute sustained winds of 195 km/h (121 mph). Moving northwards over flat agricultural lands, the storm weakened, with the JTWC issuing its final warning at 20:00 UTC that evening. The IMD continued tracking the system, reporting that it weakened into an area of low pressure on the evening of 20 November before dissipating over southeastern Madhya Pradesh and Odisha the next evening.

== Impact ==
The worst affected areas were in the Krishna River delta region. The island of Diviseema, which was hit by a seven-metre-high (23-foot) storm surge, experienced a loss of life running into the thousands. Hundreds of bodies were floating in the waters and bodies bloated beyond recognition were consigned to mass pyres. Landslides ripped off the railway lines in the Waltair-Kirandal route. About 100 people who had left their homes to seek shelter in a church in Bapatla town were killed when the building collapsed. Fields of paddy and cash crops were submerged by the tidal waves. Thirteen sailing vessels, including some foreign ones, went missing in the storm.

About 100 villages were marooned or washed away by the cyclonic storms and the ensuing floods and a total of 10,841 killed or missing, and 34 lakh rendered homeless. According to the Janata party, at least 50,000 people were believed to have been killed by the storm, substantially higher than reported by the government.

== Aftermath ==
The large loss of life prompted the establishment of early warning meteorological stations on the coast of Andhra Pradesh. Cyclone shelters and other measures for disaster management were also taken. A memorial, at the point of furthest advance of the tidal wave, near the town of Avanigadda, was built in memory of the people who died in the storm.

The next cyclone (1990) that also occurred in Andhra Pradesh, showed that there was a large improvement in disaster management, effective warnings ahead of time, and better meteorological equipment which dramatically reduced the death rate (compared to the cyclone in 1977).

In the wake of the disaster, officials in India were accused of covering up the scale of damage and loss of life. Members of the Janata party, an opposing political group to the state government in place at the time, claimed that the cover up was to hide criminal negligence which resulted in tens of thousands of fatalities. Following these accusations, five high-ranking government officials resigned from their positions.

== See also ==
- 1984 Sriharikota cyclone
- Typhoon Gay (1989)
- 1996 Andhra Pradesh cyclone
