= Munjuluru =

- Village
- Interactive map of Munjuluru
- Location in Andhra Pradesh, India
- Country: India
- State: Andhra Pradesh
- District: Krishna
- Mandal: Bantumilli

Area
  - Total: 9.63 km^{2} (3.72 sq mi)

Population (2011)
  - Total: 1,996
  - Density: 207/km^{2} (537/sq mi)

Languages
  - Official: Telugu
- Time zone: UTC+5:30 (IST)

Munjuluru is a village in Bantumilli mandal strategically located in the state of Andhra Pradesh of India. The population of the village is around three thousand.
