= Zamidintakurru =

- Village
- Interactive map of Zamidintakurru
- Location in Andhra Pradesh, India
- Coordinates: 16.438°N 80.93794°E
- Country: India
- State: Andhra Pradesh
- District: Krishna

Area
  - Total: 2.89 km^{2} (1.12 sq mi)

Population (2011)
  - Total: 616
  - Density: 213/km^{2} (552/sq mi)

Languages
  - Official: Telugu
- Time zone: UTC+5:30 (IST)

Zamidintakurru is a village in Krishna district of the Indian state of Andhra Pradesh. It is the mandal headquarters of Pedaparupudi mandal in Nuzvid revenue division.
