= Hamsaladeevi =

Hamsaladeevi హంసలదీవి
- Village
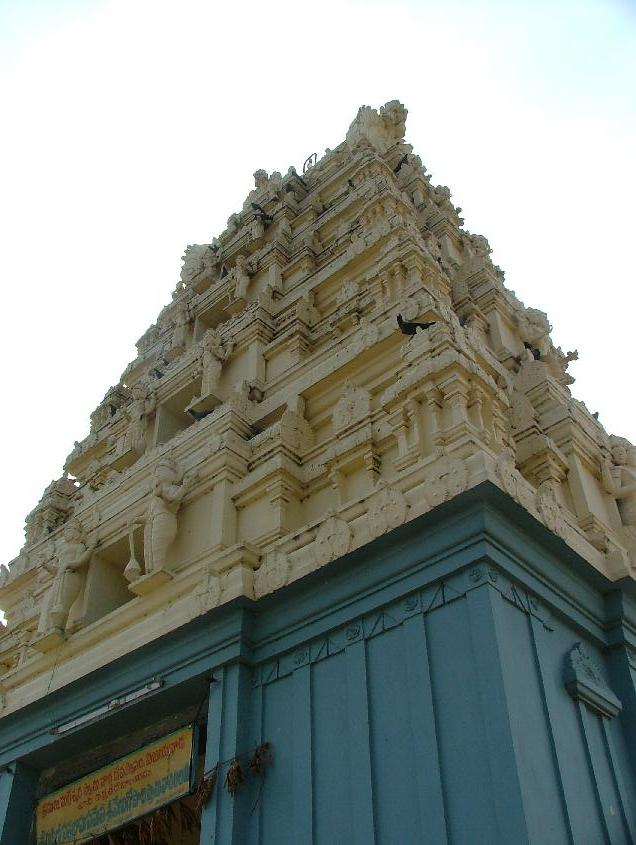
- Venugopalaswamy temple at Hamsaladeevi village
- Interactive map of Hamsaladeevi
- Location in Andhra Pradesh, India
- Coordinates: 15°58′39″N 81°05′59″E
- Country: India
- State: Andhra Pradesh
- District: Krishna

Government
  - Body: Andhra Pradesh Legislative Assembly
- Elevation: 6.5 m (21 ft)

Languages
  - Official: Telugu
- Time zone: UTC+5:30 (IST)
- PIN: 521328
- Telephone code: 276
- Vehicle registration: AP
- Nearest city: Machilipatnam, Avanigadda

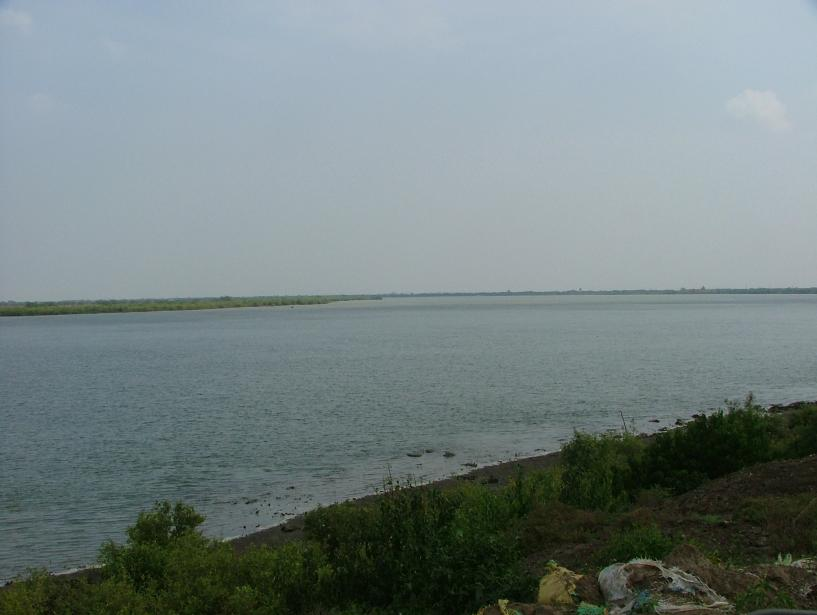
Hamsaladeevi

Hamsaladeevi (Telugu: హంసలదీవి, romanized: Hamsaladeevi, lit. 'Swans Island') is a village in Diviseema, Koduru Mandal, Krishna District of the Indian state of Andhra Pradesh.

It is about 88 km from Vijayawada and 40 kilometres (25 miles) from Machilipatnam. The nearest city is Avanigadda.

Hamsaladeevi hosts an old temple of Lord Krishna (Venugopalaswamy), constructed during the rule of Chola kings. It is one of the 108 Vishnu temples.

The Krishna River converges into the Bay of Bengal right outside the village. The confluence is known as Sagara Sangamam; three colours of water can be seen there.
