= Penumudi–Puligadda Bridge =

- Coordinates: 16°2′22″N 80°53′25″E
- Crosses: Krishna River
- Locale: Andhra Pradesh
- Owner: Andhra Pradesh Road Development Corporation

Characteristics
- Total length: 2.95 km (1.83 mi)

History
- Constructed by: Navayuga Engineering Company Ltd.
- Construction cost: ₹71 crore (US$7.4 million)

Location
- Interactive map of Penumudi–Puligadda Bridge

Penumudi–Puligadda Bridge is located on the Krishna River on National Highway 214. It spans the river from Penumudi in Bapatla district to Puligadda in Krishna district, and hence the name. The bridge became operational on 27 May 2006, and was inaugurated by the then Chief Minister YS Rajasekhara Reddy. It reduces the travel between the districts by approximately 100 km (62 mi). The total cost of construction was estimated as ₹71 crore (US$7.4 million) on a build, operate and transfer (BOT) basis completed by Navayuga Engineering Company Limited.
