= Pedayerukapadu =

- Village
- Interactive map of Pedayerukapadu
- Location in Andhra Pradesh, India
- Country: India
- State: Andhra Pradesh
- District: Krishna

Population
  - Total: 128

Languages
  - Official: Telugu
- Time zone: UTC+5:30 (IST)
- PIN: 521 xxx
- Literacy: 86.89%
- Lok Sabha constituency: Machilipatnam

Pedayerukapadu is one of the oldest areas of Gudivada. Gudivada is a census town in Krishna district in the Indian state of Andhra Pradesh.

== Population ==
As per census 2011, Pedayerukapadu has a population of 13014. Among them, 6576 are males and 6438 females.
