= Kallamvaripalem =

Village in Andhra Pradesh, India

Kallamvaripalem is a village located in Janakavaram Panguluru mandal Prakasam district, Andhra Pradesh, India 521163. The village population is less than 1200.

== Language ==
The local language of Kallamvaripalem is Telugu.
