= Challapalli mandal =

Challapalli
- Mandal
- Interactive map of Challapalli
- Location in Andhra Pradesh, India
- Coordinates: 16.116°N 80.933°E
- Country: India
- State: Andhra Pradesh
- District: Krishna
- Headquarters: Challapalli

Government
  - Body: Mandal Parishad

Area
  - Total: 89.73 km^{2} (34.64 sq mi)

Population (2011)
  - Total: 53,540
  - Density: 596.7/km^{2} (1,545/sq mi)

Languages
  - Official: Telugu
- Time zone: UTC+5:30 (IST)
- Vehicle registration: AP 16

Challapalli mandal is one of the 25 mandals in the Krishna district of the Indian state of Andhra Pradesh. The headquarters of this mandal are located in Challapalli.

== Demographics ==
As of the 2011 census of India, the mandal had a population of 53,540 living in 16,430 households. The total population consisted of 26,947 females and 26,593 males, for a sex ratio of 1,013 females to 1,000 males. There were 4,716 children aged 0–6 years, which consisted of 2,218 girls and 2,498 boys, for a sex ratio of 888 females to 1,000 males. The average literacy rate stands at 74.63% with 36,439 literates, of which 17,645 are females and 18,794 are males. There were 11,963 members of Scheduled Castes and 1,448 members of Scheduled Tribes.

=== Labor statistics ===
According to the 2011 census of India, 25,201 people were employed, including 9,304 females and 15,897 males. 23,060 workers described their work as manual labor, 2,294 as cultivators, 12,335 as agricultural laborers, 1,002 as household industry, and 7,429 as involved in other. Of these, only 2,141 were marginal workers.

== Administration ==
Challapalli mandal is administered under the Avanigadda Assembly constituency of the Machilipatnam Lok Sabha constituency. It is one of the 10 mandals which fall under the Machilipatnam revenue division.

== Towns and villages ==
According to the 2011 census, there are a total of 11 settlements in this mandal. Challapalli is the largest, and Nimmagadda is the smallest in terms of population.

The settlements in the mandal are:

1. Challapalle
2. Cheedepudi
3. Lakshmipuram
4. Majeru
5. Mangalapuram
6. Nadakuduru
7. Nimmagadda
8. Pagolu
9. Puritigadda
10. Vakkalagadda
11. Velivolu
12. Yarlagadda
13. Nukala Vaari Palem

== Education ==
This mandal plays a major role in education for the rural students of nearby villages. Primary and secondary school education is administered by the School Education Department of the state, aided by private schools. As per the school report for the 2015–2016 academic year, the mandal has more than 8,998 students enrolled in over 66 schools.

== See also ==
- List of mandals in Andhra Pradesh
- Vijayawada
