= Vadali, Eluru district =

Vadali Chinna Puri
- Village
- Interactive map of Vadali
- Location in Andhra Pradesh, India
- Coordinates: 16.428635°N 81.132998°E
- Country: India
- State: Andhra Pradesh
- District: Eluru

Area
  - Total: 2 km^{2} (0.77 sq mi)

Population
  - Total: 25,000
  - Density: 12,000/km^{2} (32,000/sq mi)

Languages
- Time zone: UTC+5:30 (IST)
- PIN: 521325
- Vehicle registration: AP16
- Nearest city/Town: Gudivada
- Sex ratio: 3:2 ♂/♀
- Literacy: 80%
- Vidhan Sabha constituency: Kaikalur
- Climate: cool, (Köppen)

Vadali is an Indian village located 2 kilometers away from Mudinepalli mandal, Eluru district, Andhra Pradesh, situated near Machilipatnam.

== See also ==
- Mudinepalli
- Eluru district
- Andhra Pradesh
