= Movva mandal =

Movva Mandal
- mandal
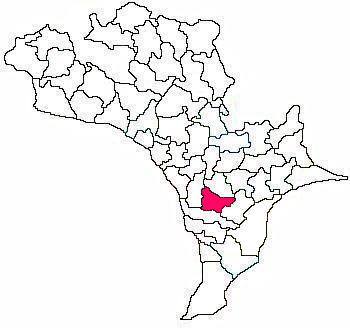
- Interactive Map Outlining mandal
- Location in Andhra Pradesh, India Movva Mandal (India)
- Coordinates: 16.2264°N 80.9166°E
- Country: India
- State: Andhra Pradesh
- District: Krishna
- Mandal: Movva

Languages
  - Official: Telugu
- Time zone: UTC+5:30 (IST)
- Postal code: 521 135
- Vehicle registration: AP 16

Movva mandal is one of the 50 mandals in the Krishna district of the Indian state of Andhra Pradesh. Movva Mandal is the birth place of Siddendra Yogi, hailed from Kuchipudi, founder of Kuchipudi Dance.
