= Krishna district =

District in Andhra Pradesh, India

- District of Andhra Pradesh
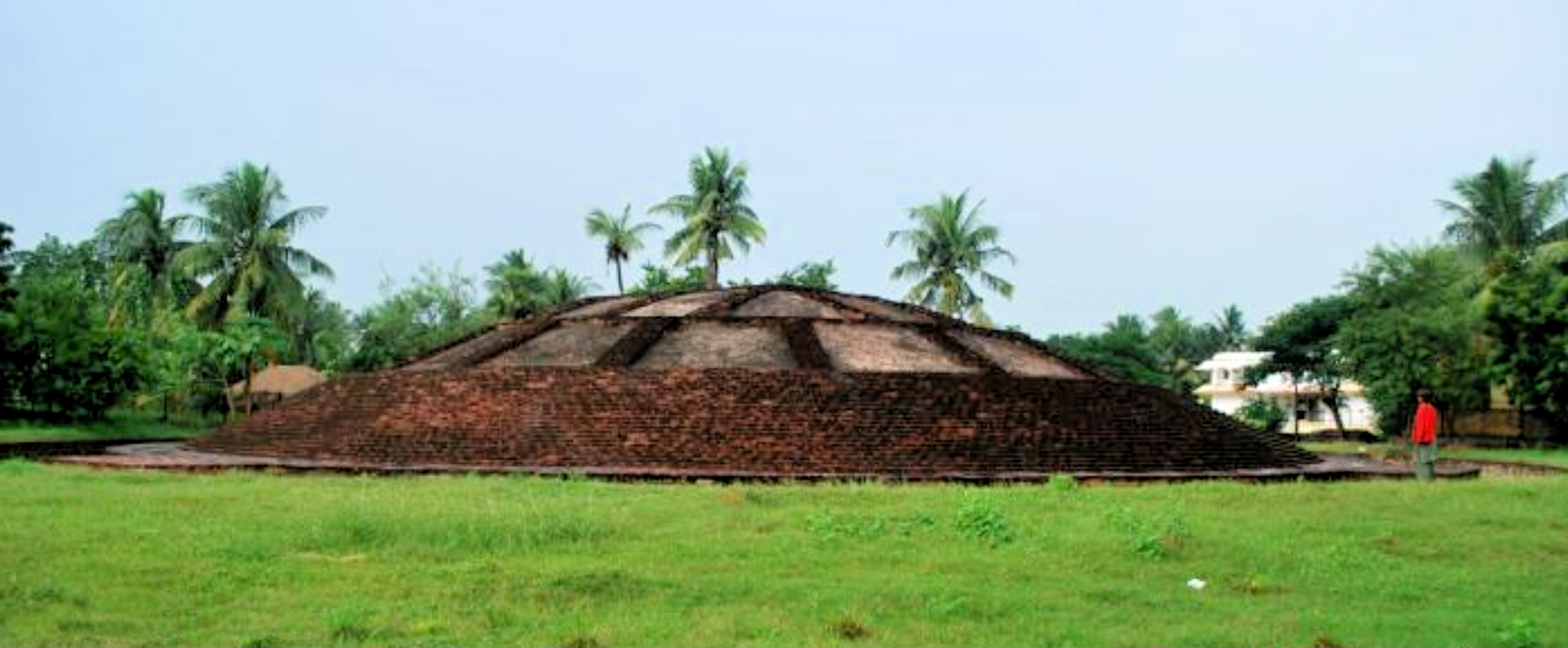
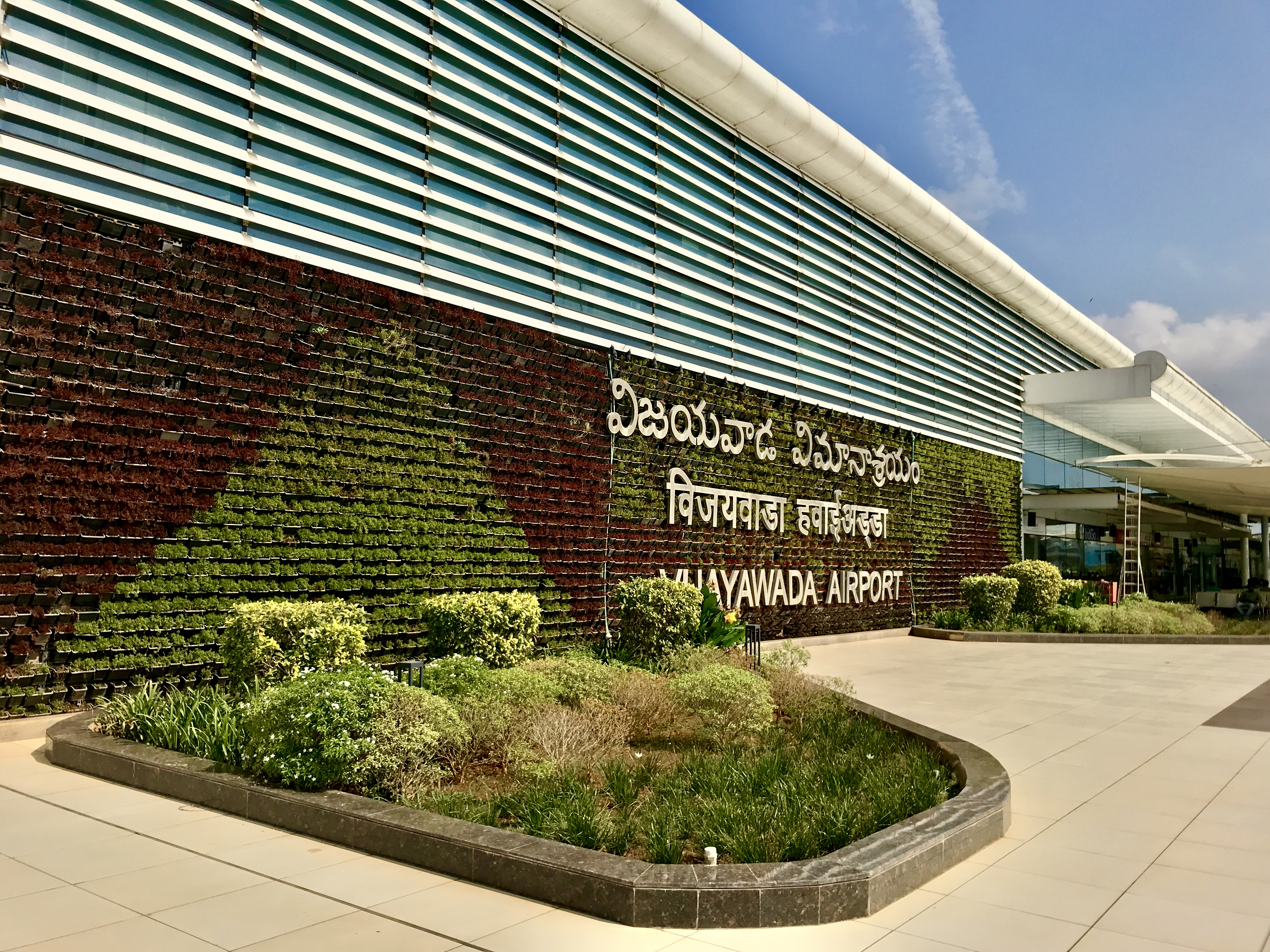
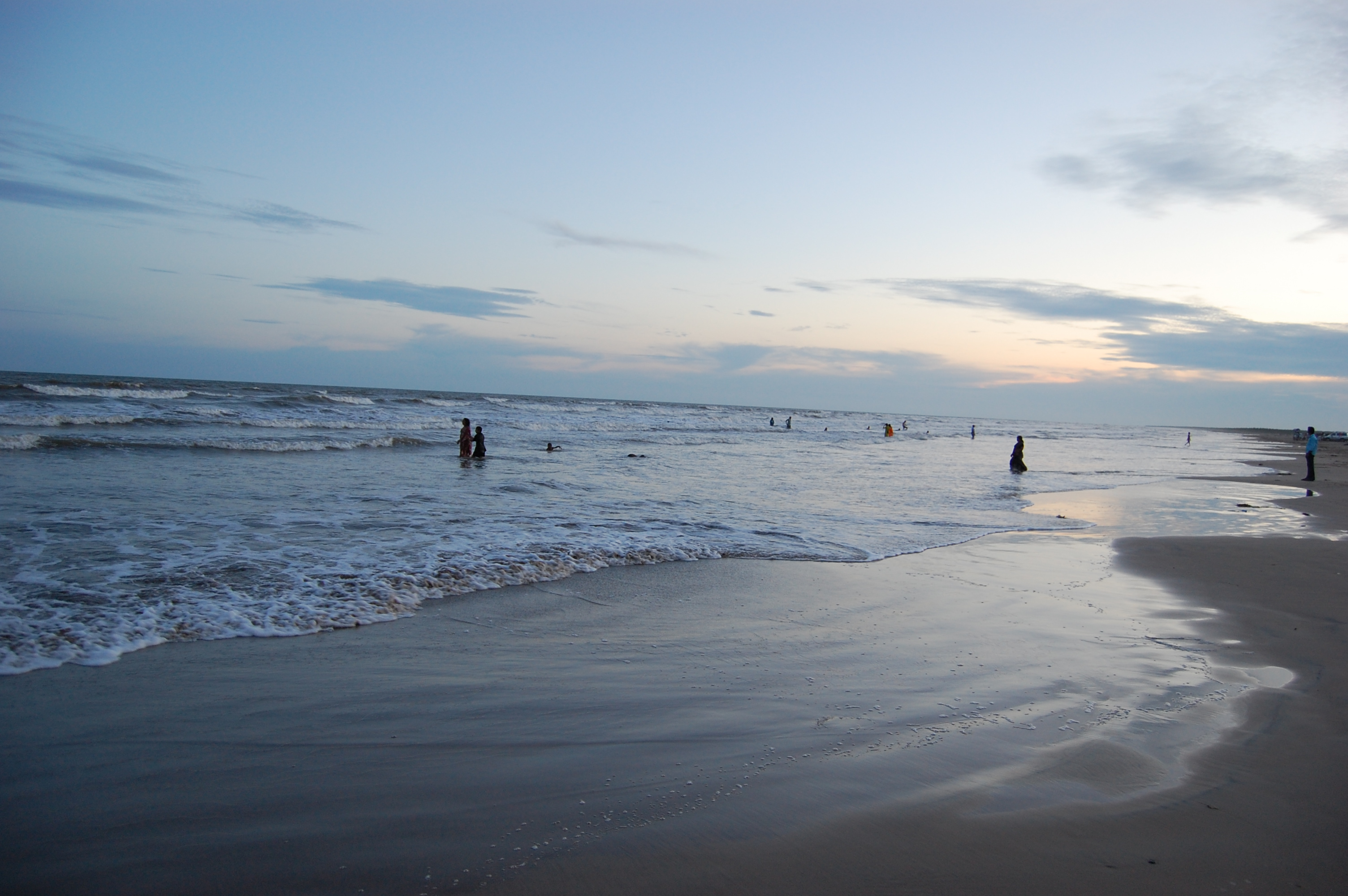
- Ghantasala stupa Vijayawada Airport Machilipatnam beach
- Interactive map of Krishna district
- Coordinates (Machilipatnam): 16°11′40″N 81°08′58″E
- Country: India
- State: Andhra Pradesh
- Region: Coastal Andhra
- Headquarters: Machilipatnam
- Administrative divisions: 03 revenue divisions; 26 mandals

Government
  - District collector and magistrate: D. K. Balaji, IAS
  - Superintendent of Police: V. Vidhya Sagar Naidu, IPS
  - Lok Sabha constituencies: 01 constituency
  - Assembly constituencies: 07 constituencies

Area
  - Total: 3,773 km^{2} (1,457 sq mi)

Population (2011)
  - Total: 1,735,079
  - Density: 459.9/km^{2} (1,191/sq mi)

Demographics
  - Literacy: 73.74%
  - Sex ratio: 996
- Time zone: UTC+5:30 (IST)
- Vehicle registration: AP-16 (former); AP–39, AP–40 (from 30 January 2019)
- Major highways: NH-65, NH-216
- District LGD code: 510
- District abbreviation: KRS
- Website: krishna.ap.gov.in

Krishna district is a district in the Coastal Andhra region in Indian state of Andhra Pradesh, with Machilipatnam as its administrative headquarters. It is surrounded on the east by Bay of Bengal, west by Guntur, Bapatla and north by Eluru and NTR districts and south again by Bay of Bengal.

== Etymology ==
It was named after the Krishna River (also known as Krishnaveni in literature) the third longest river in India. The river flows through the district before it empties itself into Bay of Bengal, near Hamsaladevi village.

== History ==
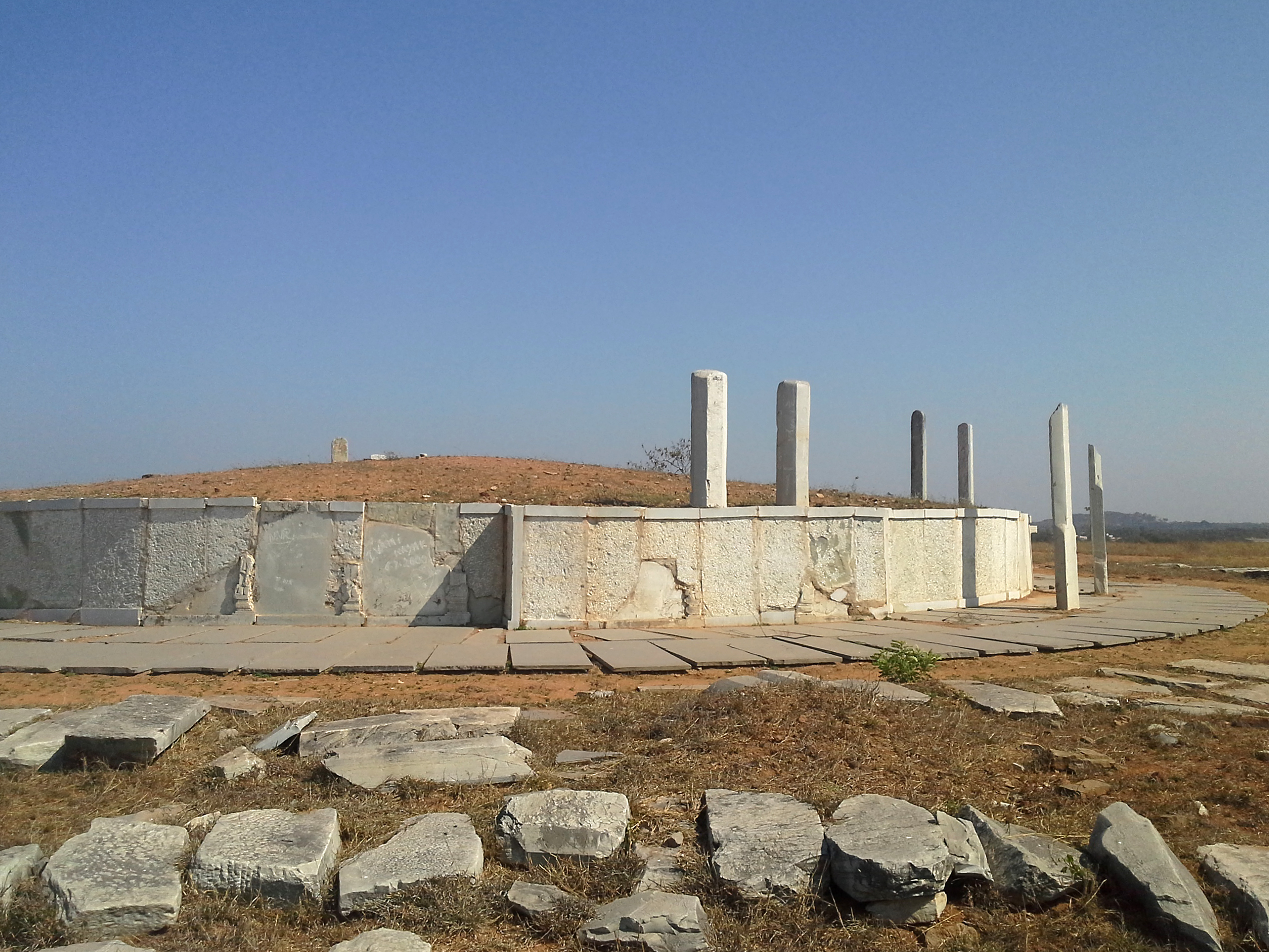
A view of the famous Jaggayyapeta Buddhist stupa

The history of this region dates back to the 2nd century BCE. The area was ruled by the Satavahanas (230 BC – AD 227); Pallavas (AD 340 – AD 500), Chalukyas (AD 615 – 1070 AD) and later by Cholas, Kakatiyas, Musunuri Nayaks, Reddy dynasty and Gajapati kings of Odisha.

Satavahana period (230 BC – AD 227): The Satavahanas ruled this region with headquarters at Srikakulam, at present a village in Ghantasala mandal of the district. Prominent rulers during this period were Srimukha (founder), Gotamiputra Satakarni and Yajnasri Satakarni (last Satavahana king). The Satavahanas imparted more stability and security to the life of the people of the region for more than four centuries.

Pallava Kingdom (AD 340 – AD 500), spread over from Krishna river to Tungabhadra, including Amaravati in the East, Bellary in the West and Kancheepuram in the South with capital cities at Venginagar near Eluru and Pithapuram, both in Vengidesa. Bruhitpalayanas, the contemporaries of Pallavas ruled the district with Koduru as their capital. Vishnukundinas (AD 6th century) rulers created cave temples at Mogalrajapuram (now in Vijayawada) and Undavalli.

Eastern chalukyas (AD 615 – AD 1070), the entire Andhra country was under the control of a single ruler under their reign. The Eastern Chalukyas were credited with the excavations of the cave temple at Undavalli, rock cut shrines, and Shiva temples.

Cholas ruled this region with their capital located at Rajamahendri. It was during Rajaraja Narendra's reign that Nannayya Bhattu translated the Mahabharata into Telugu. Kakatiyas ruled this region up to the early 14th century with Orugallu as their capital. They are followed by Musunuri Nayaks who rebelled against Delhi sultanate and won. Musunuri Nayaks constructed various forts in South India including Hampi and ruled many states of India independently. Reddy dynasty a subordinate of Musunuri Kapaya Naidu established himself in the hill fort of Kondaveedu. The Kondaveedu Reddis were great patrons of Telugu literature. The poet Srinadha and his brother-in-law Bammera Pothana flourished at his court.

Gajapathis of Odisha: Kapileswarapuram named in honour of Kapileswara Gajapathi now in Pamidimukkala mandal exists to this day. He was succeeded by Vidyadhara Gajapathi who built Vidyadharapuram (now in Vijayawada) and constructed a reservoir at Kondapalli. Krishnadevaraya of Vijayanagara Empire conquered this region in the early 16th century. Then this region became part of the Kingdom of Golconda in 1550 which was founded by Sultan Quli Qutub Shah as part of the Qutb Shahis in 1512. Abu-l-Hussain Shah known as Tanisha was the last ruler of Qutab Shahi dynasty.

=== Medieval period ===
Aurangazeb ruled this region as part of the province of Golconda. Asaf Jah who was appointed as subedar or viceroy of the Deccan in AD 1713 with the title of Nizam-ul-Mulk. The province of Golconda comprised five Nawabs’ charges viz. Arcot, Cuddapah, Kurnool, Rajahmundry and Chicacole (Srikakulam). This region was part of the Nawab of Rajahmundry.

The British: In the year 1611 the English founded their settlement at Masulipatnam which remained their headquarters until they finally moved to Madras in 1641. The Dutch and French also had settlements at Masulipatnam. Upon the death of the old Nizam-ul-Mulk in June 1748, his heirs strove for the succession with the support of the English and the French. When Nizam Ali Khan was proclaimed ruler of Golconda in 1761, the British secured at first the divisions of Masulipatnam, Nizampatnam and part of Kondaveedu and later the entire Circars. At first the district was administered by a chief and council at Masulipatnam but in 1794 Collectors, directly responsible to the Board of Revenue, were appointed at Masulipatnam.

The Krishna district was formed from the district of Rajahmundry in 1859, by adding certain taluks of the abolished Guntur district. It also included West Godavari districts of united Andhra Pradesh. Guntur district was created from Krishna district in 1904. Similarly West Godavari district was created from Krishna district in 1925. There are no changes in its jurisdiction except some minor changes (in Divi taluk and Munagala paragana).

=== After 1947 ===
Krishna district had 10 talukas in 1971. In 1978 they were increased to 21 talukas. In 1985, mandal system was created and 50 mandals were formed in the district. In 2022 the district was divided into Krishna and NTR districts.

=== Historical demographics ===
As of 2011 census of India, the district had a population of 4,517,398 with a density of 518 persons per km^{2}. The total population constitute, 2,267,375 males and 2,250,023 females –a ratio of 992 females per 1000 males. The total urban population is 1,843,660 (40.81%). There are 3,009,718 literates with a literacy rate of 73.74%.

Historical population
Year	Pop.	±% p.a.
1901	861,068	—
1911	993,086	+1.44%
1921	1,059,731	+0.65%
1931	1,229,176	+1.49%
1941	1,413,516	+1.41%
1951	1,736,429	+2.08%
1961	2,076,956	+1.81%
1971	2,493,574	+1.84%
1981	3,048,463	+2.03%
1991	3,698,833	+1.95%
2001	4,187,841	+1.25%
2011	4,517,398	+0.76%

== Geography ==
Krishna district is surrounded on the east by Bay of Bengal, west by Guntur and Bapatla districts and north by Eluru and NTR districts and south by Bay of Bengal. It occupies an area of 3,775 square kilometres (1,458 sq mi). It has a total coastline of 88 km (55 mi).

=== Flora and fauna ===
The forest occupies only 9 percent of the total undivided district area. However, it contains reserved forest areas in Nandigama, Vijayawada, Tiruvuru, Nuzvid, Gannavaram, Machilipatnam and Divi Seema Talukas. A type of light wood known as ‘Ponuku’ (Gyrocapus Jacquini) is found in the Kondapalli hills. The wood is used for the manufacture of the well known Kondpalli toys. The most noticeable trees are pterocarpus, Terminalia, Anogeissus and Logustroeinai and Casuarina.

Panthers, dholes, jungle cats, foxes, bears and other carnivorous mammalian fauna are found here. Deer, spotted deer, sambar, blackbuck and other herbivorous animals are found in the inland forests. The district has a large number of Murrah buffaloes and cows.

=== Climate ===
The climatic conditions of the district consist of extremely hot summers and moderately hot winters and may be classified as tropical. The period starting from April to June is the hottest. The annual rainfall in the region is about 1047.68 mm and 66% of it is contributed to by the Southwest monsoon.

Black Cotton (57.6 percent), Sand clay loams (22.3 percent), Red loams (19.4 percent), and sandy soils account for balance 0.7% in the district.

== Demographics ==
Religions in Krishna district based on the 2011 Census
Religion	Percent
Hinduism	89.72%
Islam	6.49%
Christianity	3.18%
Other or not stated	0.61%
Distribution of religions

After reorganisation the district had a population of 17,35,079, of which 482,513 (27.81%) live in urban areas. The district has a sex ratio of 996 females per 1000 males and a literacy rate of 73.75%. Scheduled Castes and Scheduled Tribes make up 346,989 (20.00%) and 37,716 (2.17%) of the population respectively.

Languages of Krishna district based on the 2011 Census
1. Telugu (93.3%)
2. Urdu (5.97%)
3. Others (0.73%)

Based on the 2011 census, 93.30% of the population spoke Telugu and 5.97% Urdu as their first language.

== Politics ==
The parliamentary constituency is Machilipatnam Lok Sabha constituency

It comprises the following legislative assembly segments:

Constituency number	Name	Reserved for (SC/ST/None)	Parliament
71	Gannavaram	None	Machilipatnam
72	Gudivada	None	Machilipatnam
74	Pedana	None	Machilipatnam
75	Machilipatnam	Nona	Machilipatnam
76	Avanigadda	None	Machilipatnam
77	Pamarru	SC	Machilipatnam
78	Penamaluru	None	Machilipatnam

The district is divided into 3 revenue divisions: Gudivada, Machilipatnam and Vuyyuru, which are further subdivided into a total of 26 mandals, each headed by a sub-collector.

=== Mandals ===
The list of 26 mandals in Krishna district, divided into 3 revenue divisions, is given below.

1. Gudivada revenue division
  1. Bapulapadu
  2. Gannavaram
  3. Gudivada
  4. Gudlavalleru
  5. Nandivada
  6. Pedaparupudi
  7. Unguturu
2. Machilipatnam revenue division
  1. Avanigadda
  2. Bantumilli
  3. Challapalli
  4. Ghantasala
  5. Guduru
  6. Koduru
  7. Kruthivennu
  8. Machilipatnam North
  9. Machilipatnam South
  10. Mopidevi
  11. Nagayalanka
  12. Pedana
3. Vuyyuru revenue division
  1. Kankipadu
  2. Movva
  3. Pamarru
  4. Pamidimukkala
  5. Penamaluru
  6. Thotlavalluru
  7. Vuyyuru

== Cities and towns ==
There are one municipal corporation and four municipalities in the district.

Municipal Bodies in Krishna District
Ciy/Town	Civil status	Revenue Division	Population
Machilipatnam	Municipal Corporation	Machilipatnam	169,892
Gudivada	Municipality Grade – Special	Gudivada	118,167
Tadigadapa	Municipality Grade – Special	Vuyyuru	126,190
Vuyyuru	Municipality Grade – 2	Vuyyuru	49,521
Pedana	Municipality Grade – 3	Machilipatnam	30,721

== Villages ==
- Gudapadu
- Gurazada
- Kallamvaripalem
- Majeru
- Munjuluru
- Pedayerukapadu
- Vadali
- Zamidintakurru

== Economy ==
Agriculture is the main stay of economy. Paddy is the main food crop cultivated. Based on 2019–20 data, the gross cropped area of the district was 3.76 lakh hectares of which gross irrigated area was 2.42 lakh hectares. Other products produced include sugarcane, mango, tomato, milk, meat and fisheries.

== Transport ==
=== Road ===
NH 65 from Pune to Machilipatnam, NH 165 from Pamarru to Palakollu, NH 216 from Ongole to Kathipudi pass through the district.

=== Rail ===
There exists 97 km (60 mi) of rail network in the district. Gudivada Junction railway station and Machilipatnam railway station are prominent railway stations in the district. Nearest major railway station is Vijayawada Junction railway station at a distance of 80Km from Machilipatnam by train.

=== Water ===
The Machilipatnam Port is currently under construction. The port will have an initial cargo capacity of 35 million tonnes (35 MMTPA), through four berths-three general cargo berths and one coal terminal. The port is scheduled to be completed in two years. In the future, the capacity of the four-berth deep water port will be increased to 116 million tonnes (116 MMTPA) as the cargo traffic increases gradually.

=== Air ===
Krishna district is served by Vijayawada International airport located in Gannavaram at a distance of 67.9 km from Machilipatnam.

== Education ==
Dr.Gururaju Government Homoeo Medical college and Regional research institute for Homoeopathy are located in Gudivada. Krishna University is located in Machilipatnam.

== Culture ==
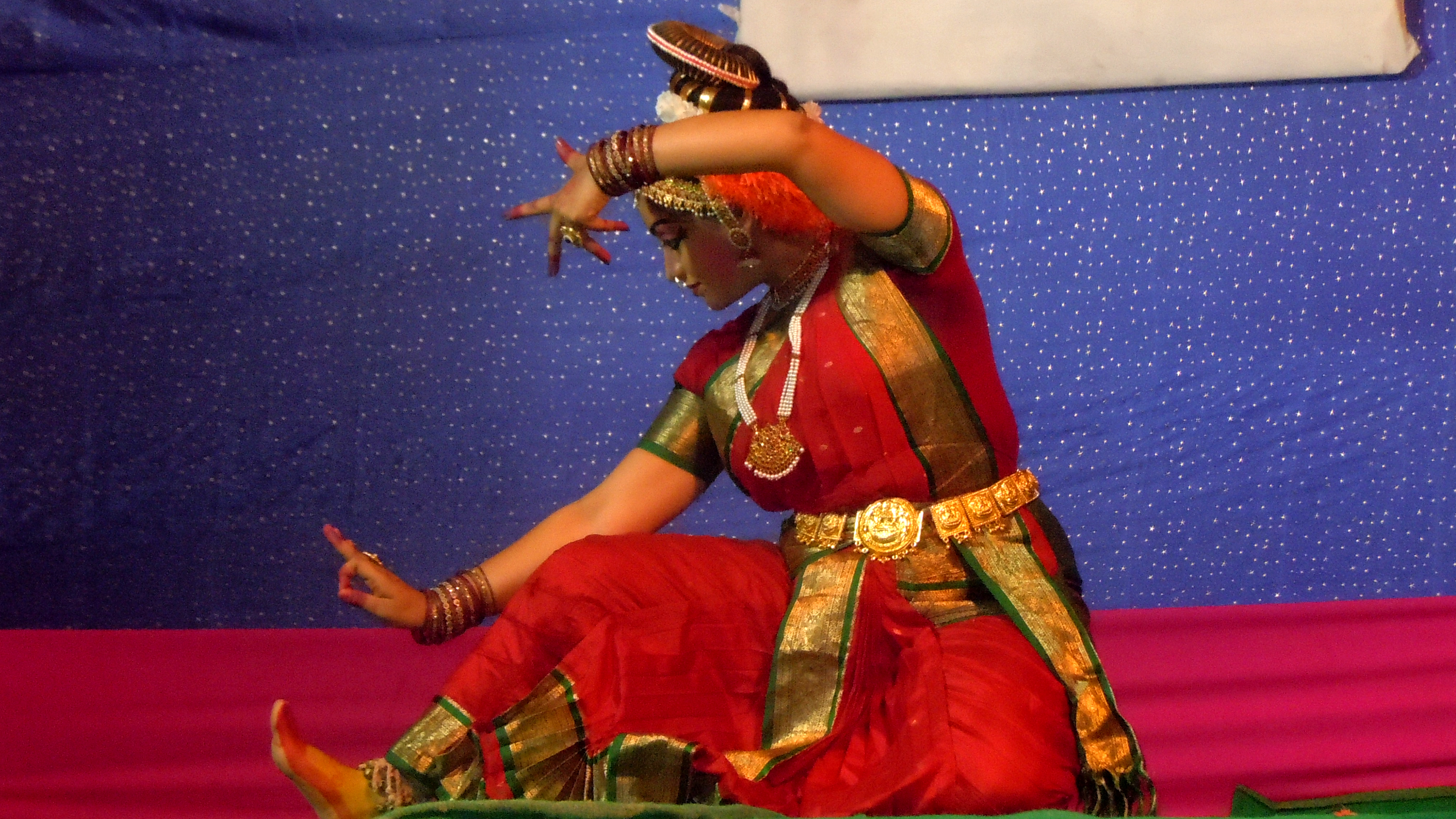
A Kuchipudi dancer performing on stage

The culture of Krishna district is mostly traditional in rural places and moderately modern in Gudivada and Machilipatnam. It is also famous as the birthplace for Indian classical dance named Kuchipudi. The dialect of Telugu spoken here is widely considered to be the standard form of Telugu.

== Sports ==
Chedugudu (Kabaddi) is the most popular sport, followed by cricket, volleyball, badminton, basketball and tennis. NTR Stadium is the main sports venue in Gudivada. It is used for several sports, like athletics, volleyball, cricket practice, kho kho, kabaddi, badminton, tennis and basketball. It is also the stadium for Krishna district cricket association.

== Tourism ==
There are several places of tourist interest in the district. Some of them are given below.

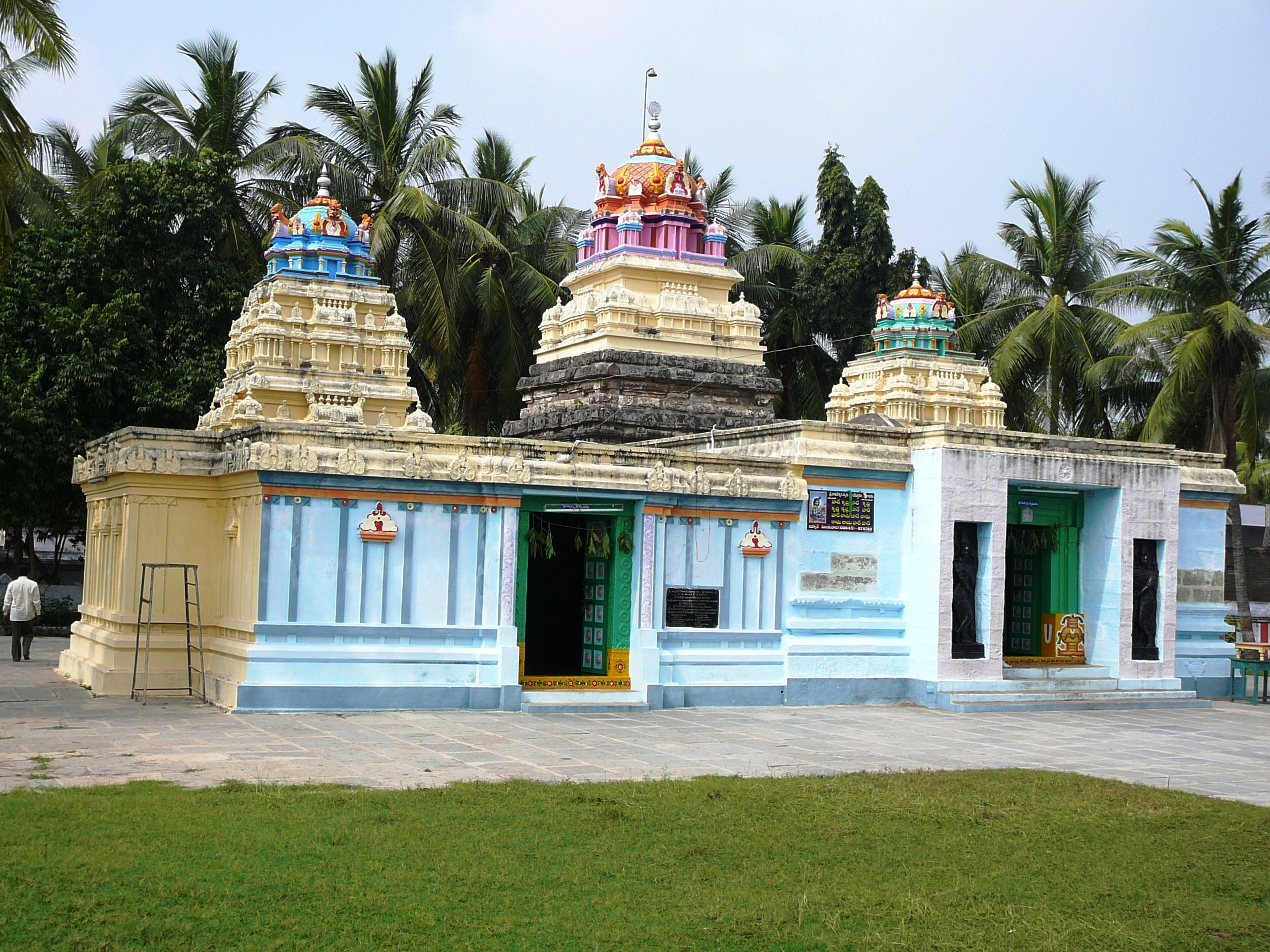
Srikakulandhra Maha Vishnu Temple

- Kolleru lake (Kaikaluru Mandal): largest freshwater lake
- Manginapudi beach: Natural beach
- Movva: Sri Movva Venugopala Swamy temple. Kshetrayya is said to have composed his famous lyrics here.
- Kuchipudi:the birth place of Siddhendra Yogi, the originator of the Kuchpudi dance
- Ghantasala: once upon a time, a port and a halting place for Buddhist pilgrims and merchants travelling from Kalinga to Ceylone. Hindu and Buddhist Sculptures can be seen here
- Srikakulam (Ghantasala Mandal): the historical capital of Andhra Empire of Goutamiputra Satakarni (AD 102–123). This is famous for the temple of Andhra Mahavishnu
- Hamsaladeevi(Koduru Mandal): river Krishna drains into the Bay of Bengal at this place
- Gudivada: famous for Jain temple of Parswandha Swamy

== Notable people ==
- Kakarla Subba Rao was born in Pedamuttevi of Movva mandal and became the first director of Nizam's Institute of Medical Sciences, Hyderabad
- Tripuraneni Ramaswamy born in Angaluru of Gudlavalleru mandal was a poet and social reformer
- Kasinadhuni Nageswara Rao was born in Pesaramilli village of Gudlavalleu mandal, was the founder of (Andhra Patrika, first telugu newspaper and also company which manufactures ayurvedic pain balm called Amrutanjan.
- Pingali Venkayya was born in Bhatlapenumarru, near Machilipatnam, was a freedom fighter and was known as designer of Indian National Flag.
- Cottari Kanakaiya Nayudu was born in Machilipatnam. He served as the first-ever captain of the Indian national cricket team.
- N. T. Rama Rao popularly referred to by his initials NTR, was an Indian actor, filmmaker and a Chief Minister of Andhra Pradesh. He was born in Nimmakuru of Gudivada mandal.
- Narla Venkateswara Rao was a Telugu language writer, journalist and politician from Andhra Pradesh in India. He was Rajya Sabha member twice from 3 April 1958 to 2 April 1970, and wrote a satakam in Telugu along with several other books.
- Narla Tata Rao was a prominent person in the power sector of India and a former chairman of the Andhra Pradesh State Electricity Board. He was born in Kavutaram
- Patcha Ramachandra Rao was a distinguished metallurgist and administrator. He was born in Kavutaram in Krishna District
- Kaikala Satyanarayana was an Indian actor, producer, director, and politician who predominantly worked in Telugu cinema. He was born in Kavutaram village in Krishna district.

== See also ==
- Coastal Andhra
