= Machilipatnam revenue division =

- revenue division in Krishna district
- Country: India
- State: Andhra Pradesh
- District: Krishna

Machilipatnam revenue division (or Machilipatnam division) is an administrative division in the Krishna district of the Indian state of Andhra Pradesh. It is one of the 3 revenue divisions in the district with 12 mandals under its administration. Machilipatnam serves as the headquarters of the division. The division has 2 municipalities namely, Machilipatnam and Pedana.

== Mandals ==
The mandals in the division are

1. Avanigadda
2. Bantumilli
3. Challapalli
4. Ghantasala
5. Guduru
6. Koduru
7. Kruthivennu
8. Machilipatnam North
9. Machilipatnam South
10. Mopidevi
11. Nagayalanka
12. Pedana

== See also ==
- List of revenue divisions in Andhra Pradesh
- Vijayawada revenue division
