= Srikakulam, Krishna district =

Village in Andhra Pradesh, India

Srikakulam
- Village
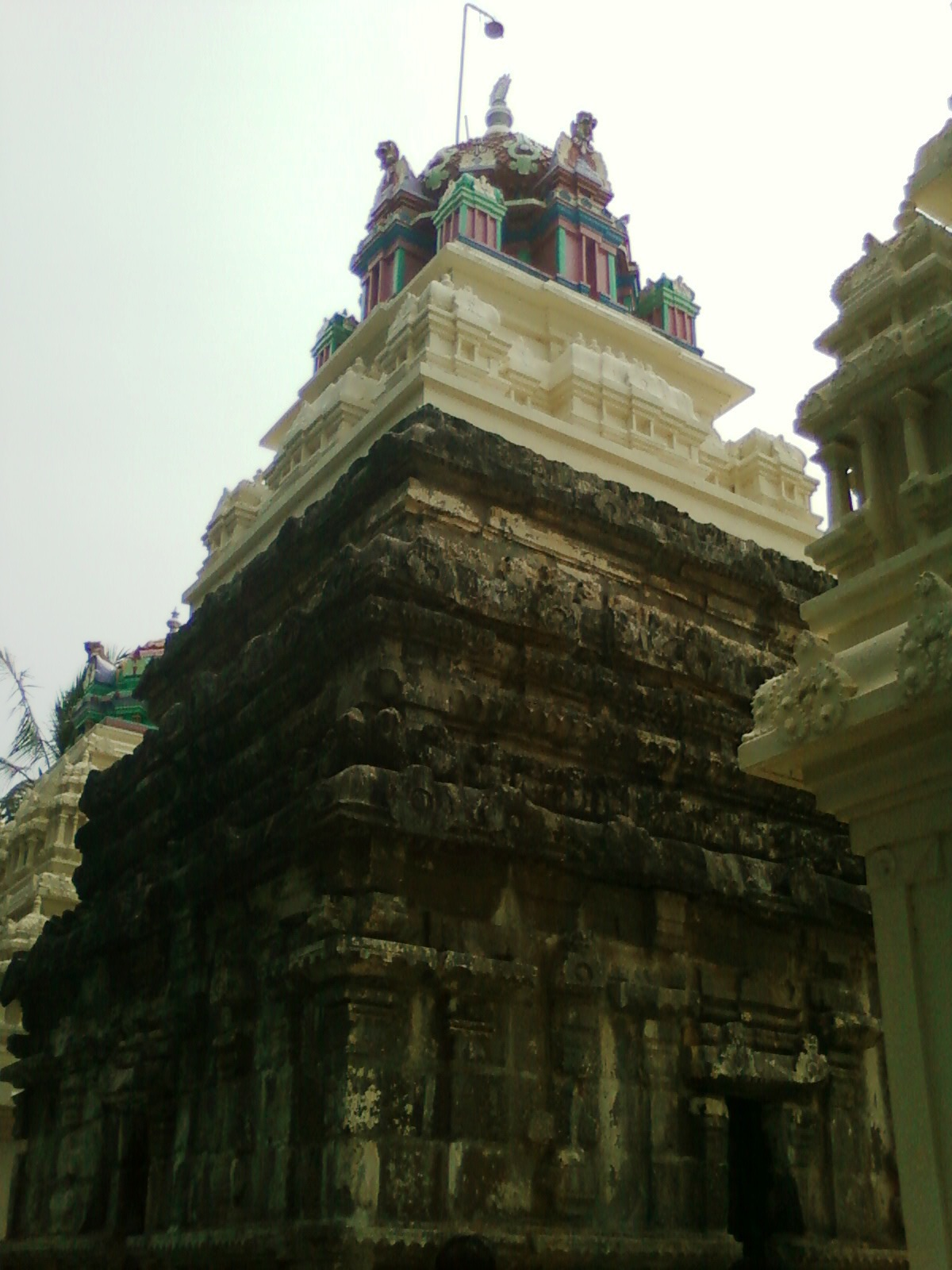
- Andhra mahavishnu Temple in Srikakulam
- Interactive map of Srikakulam
- Location in Andhra Pradesh, India
- Coordinates: 16.2000°N 80.8500°E
- Country: India
- State: Andhra Pradesh
- District: Krishna
- Elevation the: 9 m (30 ft)

Population (2001)
  - Total: 7,835

Languages
  - Official: Telugu
- Time zone: UTC+5:30 (IST)
- PIN: 521 132
- Vehicle registration: AP 16
- Nearest city: Vijayawada

Srikakulam is a village in Ghantasala mandal in Diviseema region of Krishna District, Andhra Pradesh, India

== Geography ==
Srikakulam village is located about 44 kilometers away from Vijayawada at the physical coordinates 16.2000°N 80.8500°E. It has an average elevation of 9 metres (32 ft).. The village is on the banks of the river Krishna.

== Demographics ==
As of 2001 Indian census, the demographic details of the village are:

- Total population: 7,835 in 1,976 households.
- Males: 3,877
- Females: 3,958
- Children Under 6-years: 913 (446 boys and 467 girls)
- Total literates: 4,796

== Gallery ==
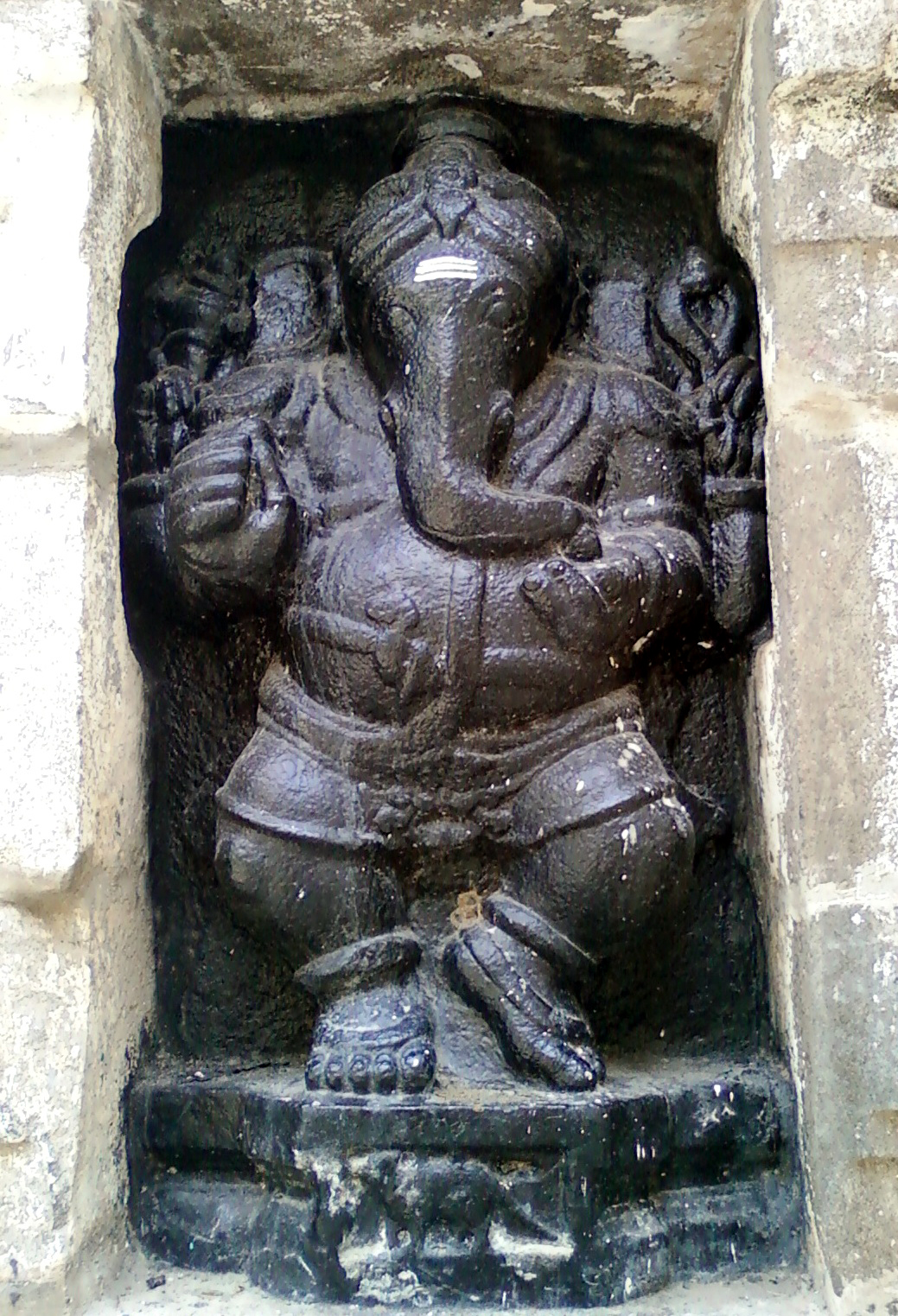

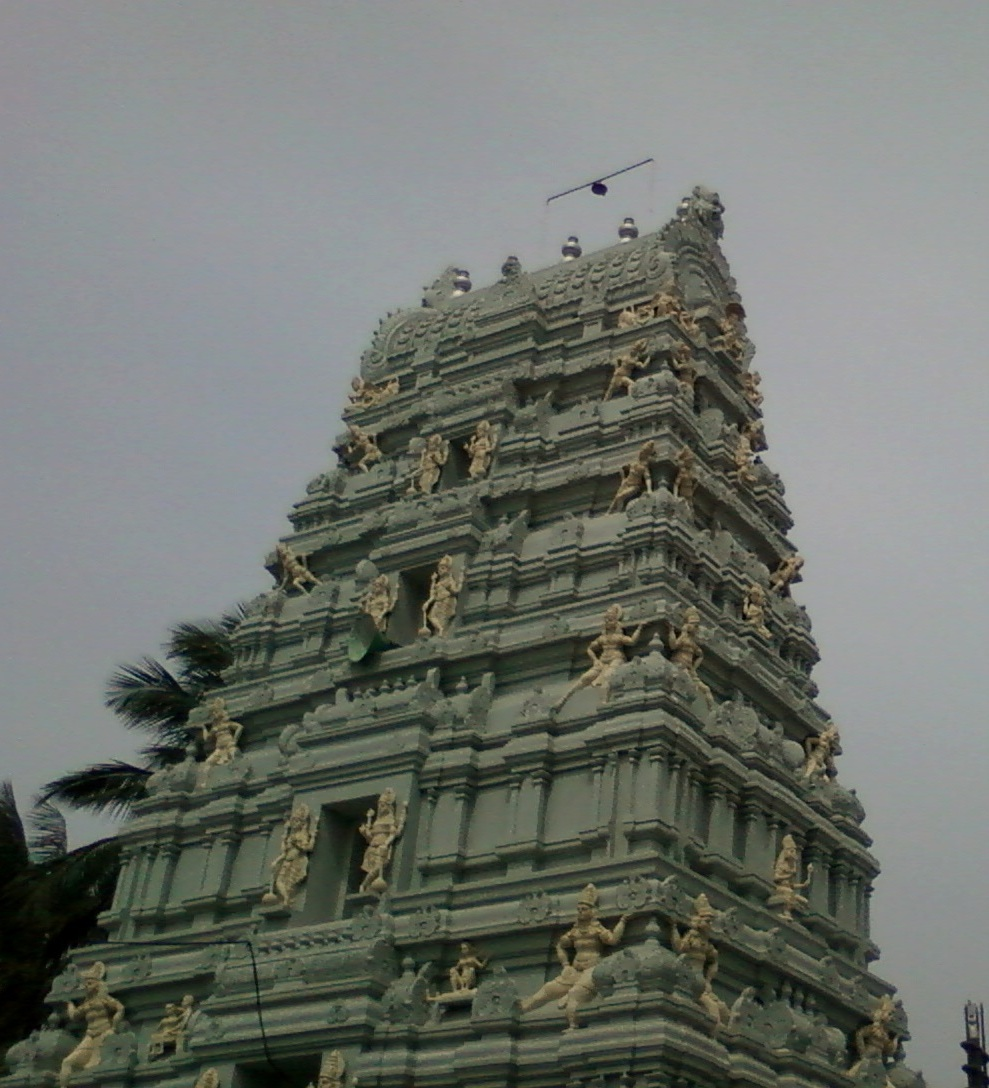

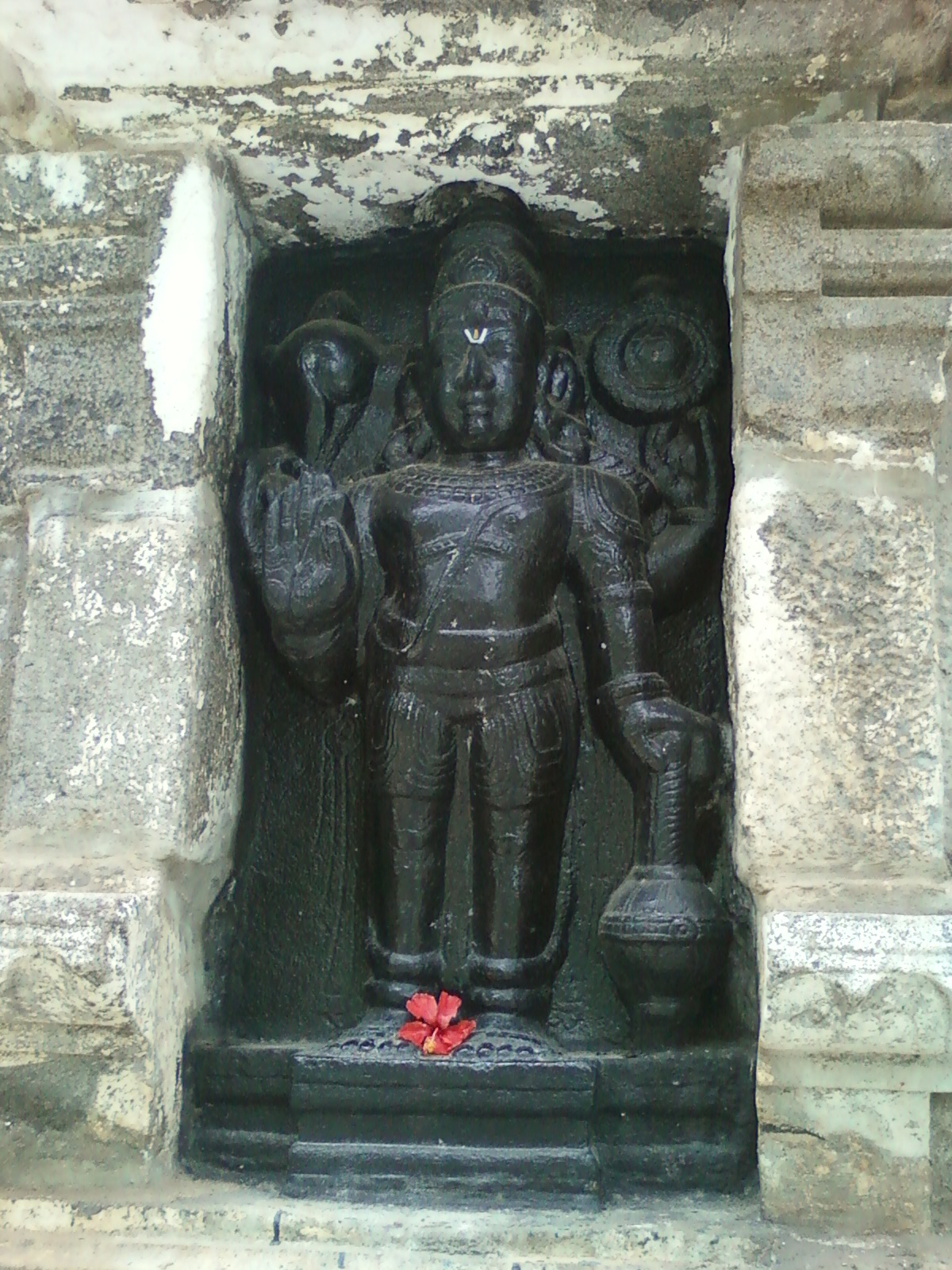

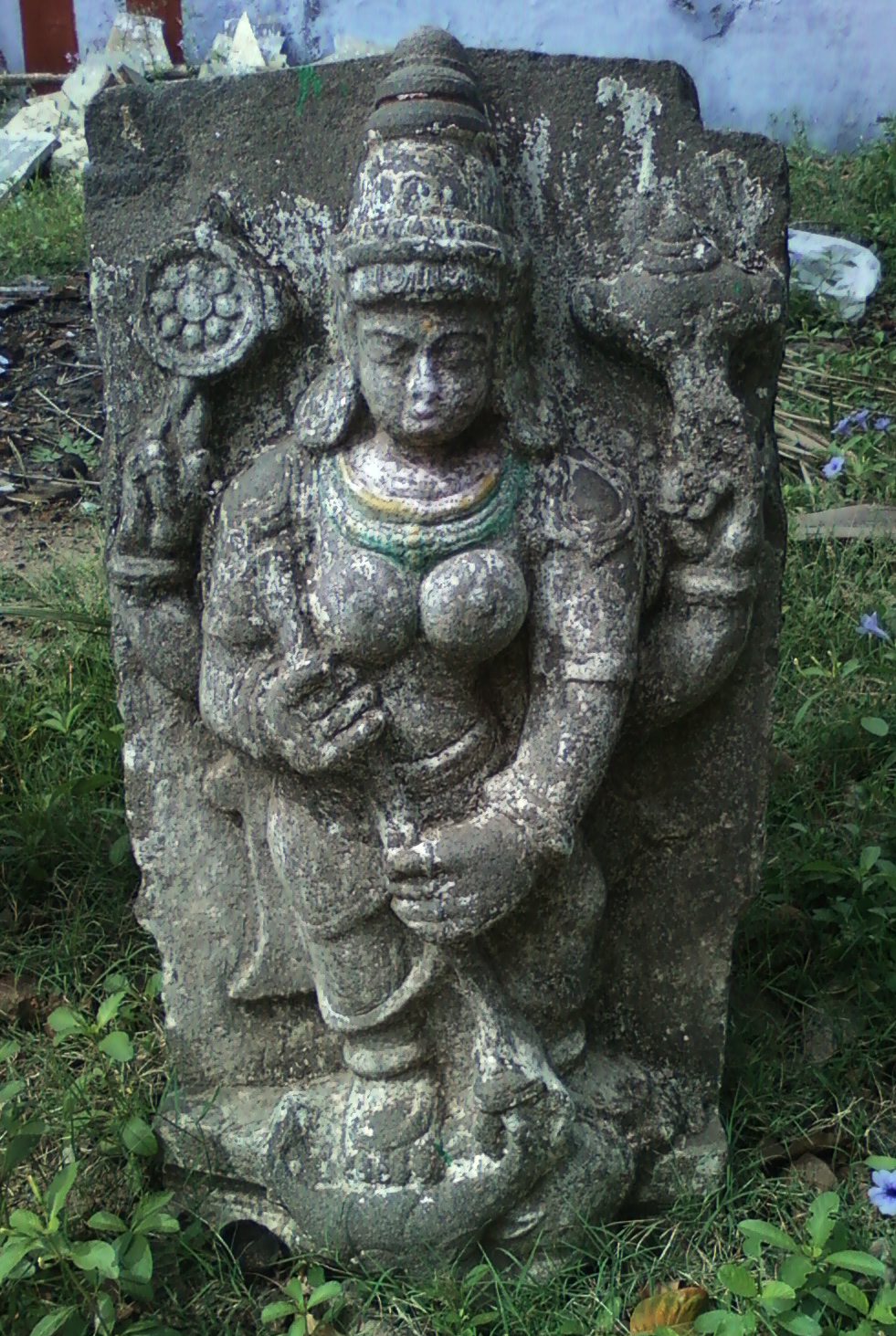

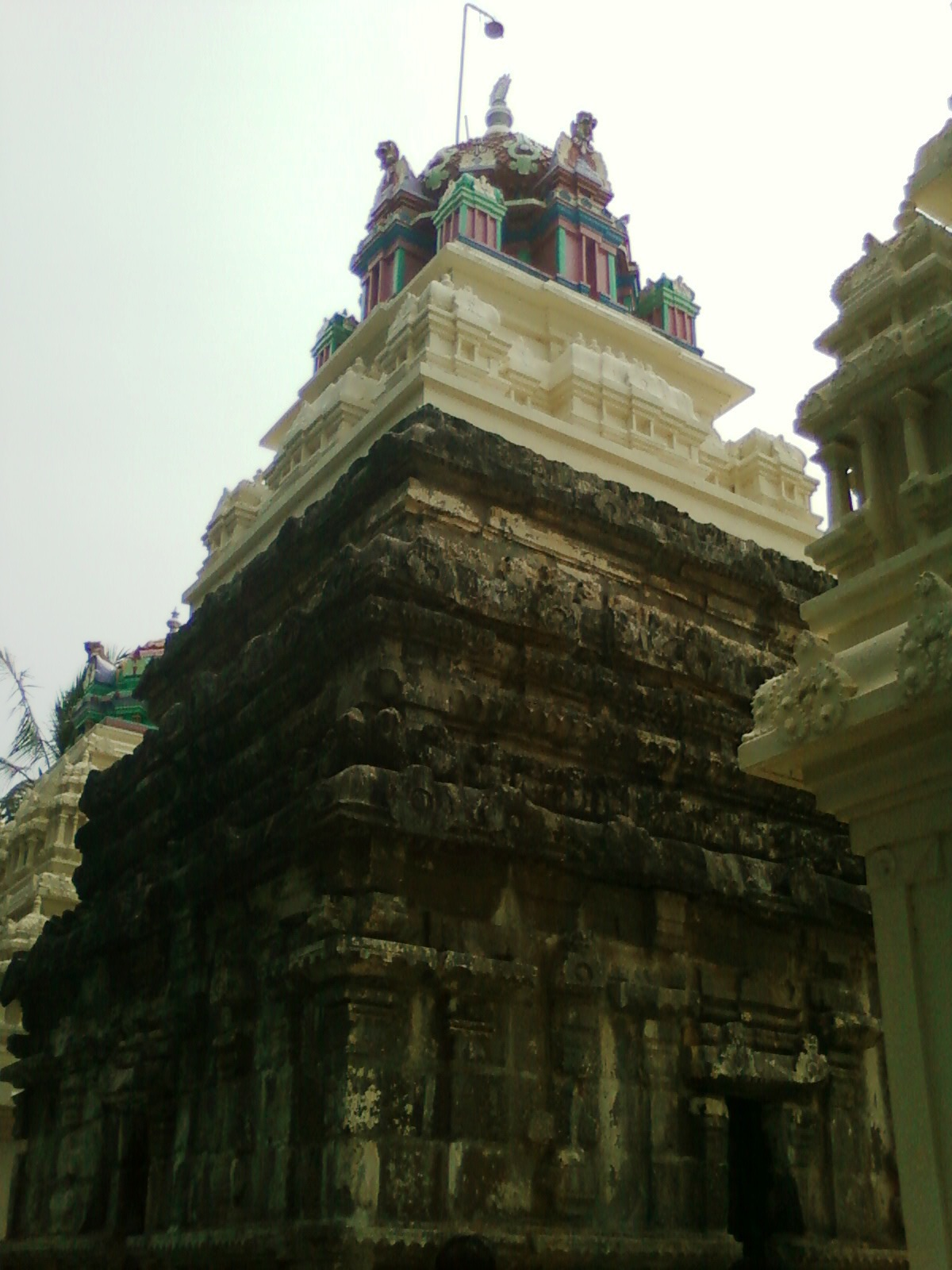

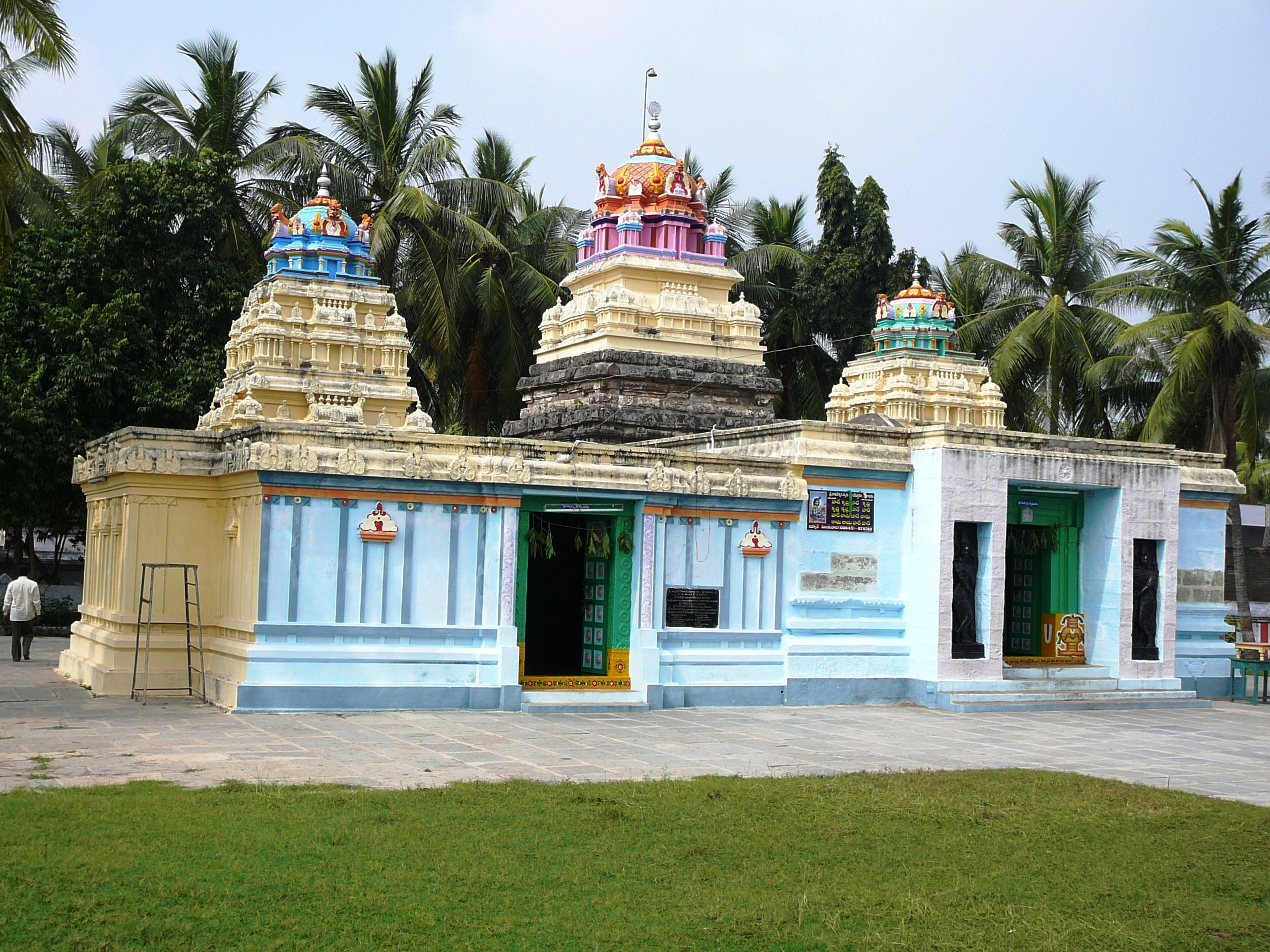
