= Koduru mandal =

- Mandal
- Interactive map of Koduru mandal
- Country: India
- State: Andhra Pradesh
- District: Krishna

Government
  - Body: Mandal Parishad

Languages
  - Official: Telugu
- Time zone: UTC+5:30 (IST)
- Vehicle registration: AP 16

Koduru mandal is a mandal of Krishna district in the Indian state of Andhra Pradesh.
