= Machilipatnam Test Range Project =

Indian missile test range

Machilipatnam Test Range Project is a missile test range facility being built by the Defence Research and Development Organisation (DRDO) of India.

As of 2012 the project is proposed to be set up at Gollalamoda village in Nagayalanka mandal of Krishna district near the coastal town of Machilipatnam. The project requires over 260 acres of land with an investment of ₹1000 Crores. The Defence minister of India, Rajnath Singh, attended the ground-breaking ceremony of the range on August 26, 2019 along with the Chief Minister of Andhra Pradesh, Y. S. Jagan Mohan Reddy.

The facility is projected to be a full-fledged testing range to support both short-range and long-range missile missions. It will have a launch control centre, a few launch pads, a blockhouse and state-of-the-art communication network, along with permanent monitoring stations for telemetry and electro-optical tracking. The project is expected to be completed in three years from the time of allotment of land to DRDO.

On 10 October 2024, under the Integrated Test Range, the Cabinet Committee on Security approved the proposal for the establishment of a new missile testing range in Nagayalanka region in Andhra Pradesh.

== See also ==
- Pashan Test Range
- Ramgarh Test Range
- Chitradurga Aeronautical Test Range
- Tandur Test Range
