= Mandali Venkata Krishna Rao =

Indian politician (1926–1997)

Mandali Venkata Krishna Rao మండలి వెంకట కృష్ణారావు
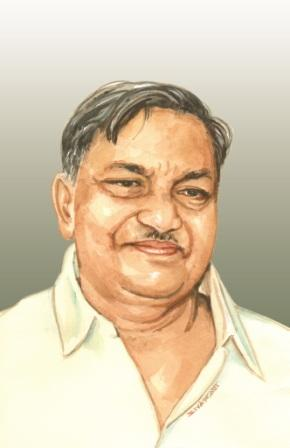

Member of Legislative Assembly, Andhra Pradesh
- In office 1972–1985
- Preceded by: Yarlagadda Sivaramprasad
- Succeeded by: Simhadri Satyanarayana Rao
- Constituency: Avanigadda

Member of Parliament, Lok Sabha
- In office 1957–1962
- Preceded by: Sanaka Buchhikotaiah
- Succeeded by: Mandala Venkata Swamy Naidu
- Constituency: Masulipatnam

Personal details
- Born: August 4, 1926 Kaikalur, Madras Presidency, British India
- Died: September 27, 1997 (aged 71)
- Party: Indian National Congress
- Spouse: Prabhavathi Devi
- Children: 2 sons, 2 daughters

Mandali Venkata Krishna Rao (4 August 1926 – 27 September 1997) was an Indian politician, social worker, and Gandhian from Andhra Pradesh, known for his contributions to Telugu language, culture, and rural development. He served as a Member of Parliament (MP) from Machilipatnam (1957–1962) and as a Member of the Legislative Assembly (MLA) from Avanigadda (1972–1985), holding various ministerial portfolios in Andhra Pradesh cabinet, including Social Welfare, Fisheries, Education, and Cultural Affairs.

Krishna Rao played a key role in organizing the first World Telugu Conference in 1975 and was widely respected for his social work, particularly for land distribution to the poor in Diviseema region. Revered as "Diviseema Gandhi," he, along with his son Mandali Buddha Prasad, led relief efforts after the 1977 Diviseema cyclone. His legacy is honoured through institutions such as the Mandali Venkata Krishna Rao Fisheries Polytechnic, and the Mandali Venkata Krishna Rao International Telugu Centre at Potti Sreeramulu Telugu University.

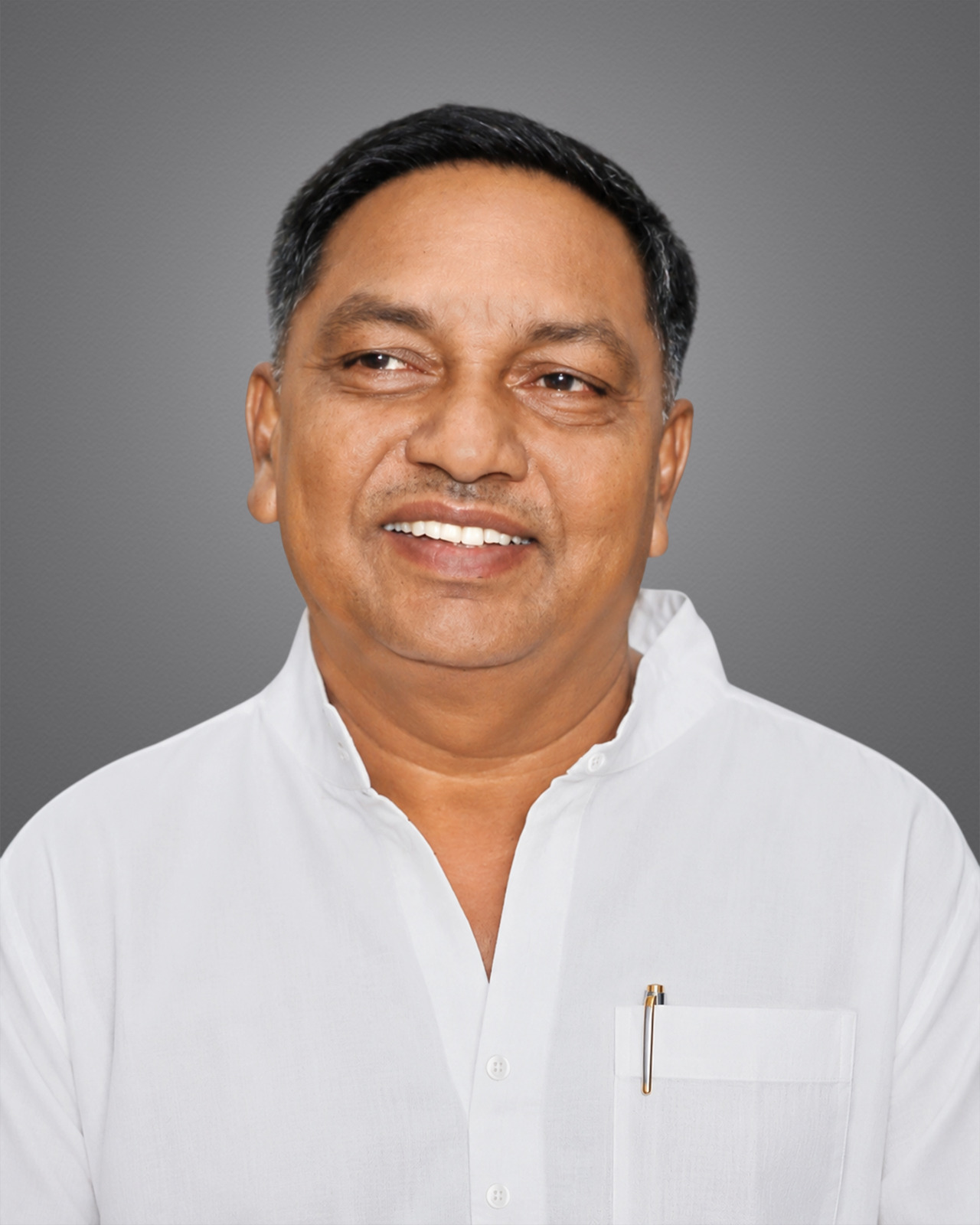

== Early life and education ==
Mandali Venkata Krishna Rao was born on 4 August 1926 in Pallevada, Kaikalur mandal, Krishna district, Madras Presidency. His native place is Bhavadevarapalli in Nagayalanka mandal, Krishna district. His father, Venkatramayya, was a school teacher. Rao completed his elementary education in Pallevada and Bhavadevarapalle and continued his high school education in Avanigadda. He later attended Hindu College in Machilipatnam for his collegiate education.

== Political career ==
Krishna Rao's political career began during the Quit India Movement, where he served as the president of the Avanigadda branch of the National Students Union. He played an active role in organizing Congress activities in rural areas during the party's underground phase. He held several leadership roles within the Congress Party, including serving as the secretary of the Divi Taluk Congress Committee and president of the District Youth Congress.

Krishna Rao was instrumental in initiating the distribution of barren lands to the impoverished in Diviseema, a program that resulted in the allocation of 15,000 acres to the poor.

In 1952 he was Minister of Education, Harijan Uplift and Information under Rajaji's second term as Chief Minister of Madras. He held this post till the formation of Andhra in 1953.

In 1957, Krishna Rao was elected to the Lok Sabha from the Masulipatnam constituency and served until 1962. During his tenure, he worked closely with his mentor, Devabhaktuni Kotiswara Rao, a prominent Congress leader. In 1962 Indian general election he contested from Masulipatnam and was defeted by Mandala Venkata Swamy Naidu.

He later shifted his focus to local politics, serving as the vice-chairman of the Krishna Zilla Parishad from 1963 to 1969 and as president of the Avanigadda Panchayat Samithi in 1970. Krishna Rao was elected unopposed to the Andhra Pradesh Legislative Assembly in 1972 from the Avanigadda constituency and held office until his defeat in 1985 election. He contested again from Avanigadda constituency in 1989 and was defeated.

== Ministerial roles and key contributions ==
Krishna Rao joined the state cabinet under Chief Minister P. V. Narasimha Rao in 1972, holding the portfolio of Social Welfare and Fisheries. He later served as the Minister for Education and Cultural Affairs in Jalagam Vengala Rao's cabinet. During this period, he played a significant role in promoting Telugu language and culture. He was the chief organizer of the first World Telugu Conference in 1975, which aimed to unite Telugu-speaking people globally. In the same year, he was appointed the first president of the International Telugu Centre, which was inaugurated by President Fakhruddin Ali Ahmed.

In recognition of his contributions to education and culture, Krishna Rao led the state's delegation to the World Hindi Conference in 1975 and participated in the 1976 conference in Mauritius. He was also involved in relief efforts following the devastating 1977 Andhra Pradesh cyclone and was honoured with the Prabhakarji Memorial Award for his social work.

Rao later served in Kotla Vijaya Bhaskara Reddy's cabinet as Minister for Co-operation in 1982. He received several honours, including the title "Telugu Data" from the Malaysia Andhra Sangham in 1983 and "Telugu Velugu" from the Madras Telugu Cultural Academy in 1985.

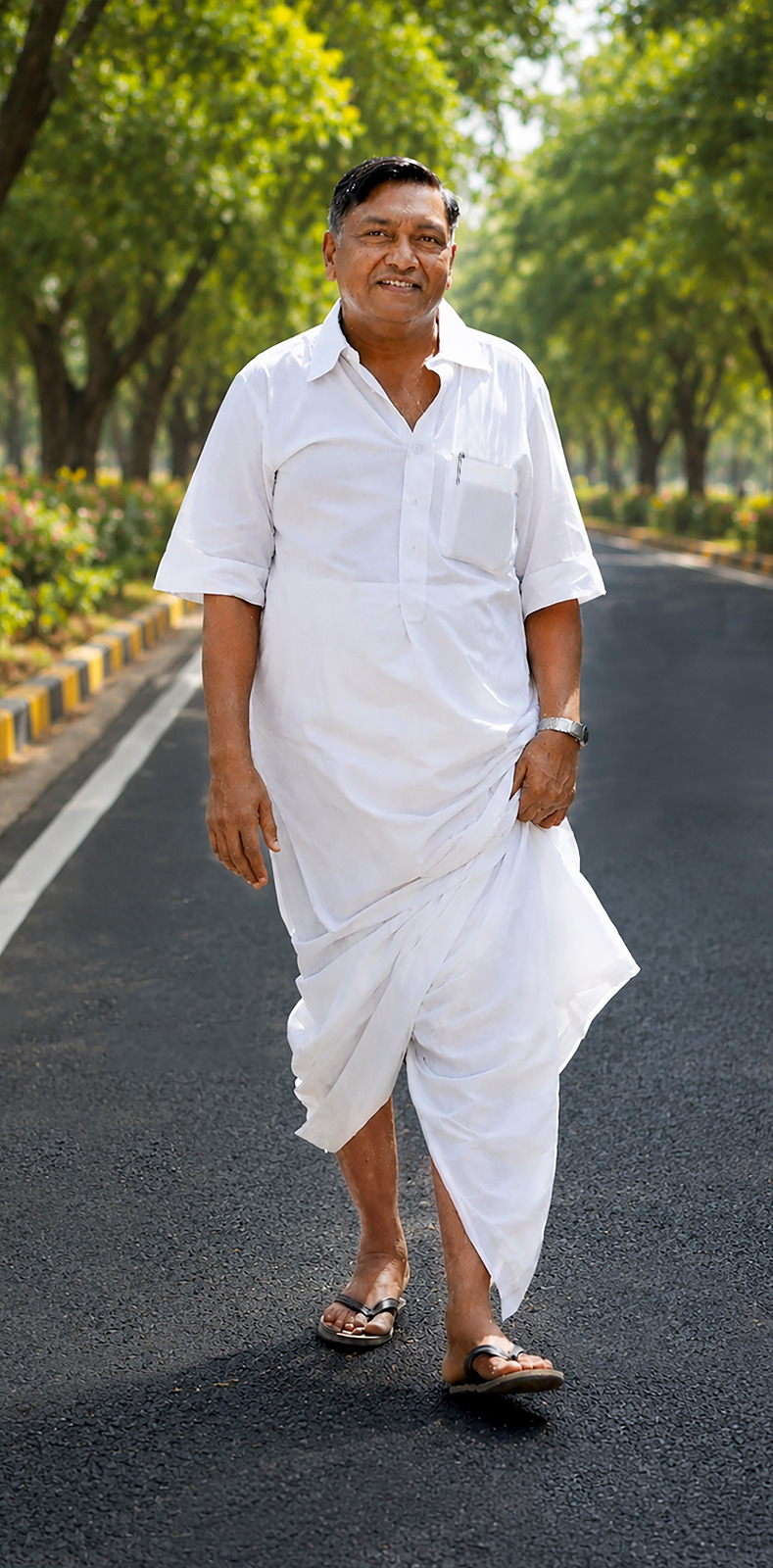

== Later years and death ==
Mandali Venkata Krishna Rao remained active in public life until his death on 27 September 1997. He continued to promote Telugu culture and language throughout his career.

== Legacy ==
Several institutions and landmarks have been named in his honour, including the Mandali Venkata Krishna Rao Bridge over the Krishna River, opened in 2006, and the Mandali Venkata Krishna Rao Fisheries Polytechnic, established in 2007 to support the aquaculture industry. The Mandali Venkata Krishna Rao International Telugu Centre at Potti Sreeramulu Telugu University continues to promote Telugu literature and culture globally.

== Family ==
Rao was married to Prabhavathi Devi, and the couple had two sons and two daughters. His son, Mandali Buddha Prasad, is a former minister in Andhra Pradesh.
