= Machilipatnam Lok Sabha constituency =

Lok Sabha Constituency in Andhra Pradesh

Coordinates: 16.2°N 81.1°E

Machilipatnam
- Lok Sabha constituency
- Interactive Map Outlining Machilipatnam Lok Sabha constituency

Constituency details
- Country: India
- Region: South India
- State: Andhra Pradesh
- Assembly constituencies: Gannavaram; Gudivada; Pedana; Machilipatnam; Avanigadda; Pamarru; Penamaluru
- Established: 1952
- Total electors: 13,69,311
- Reservation: None

Member of Parliament
- 18th Lok Sabha
- Incumbent Vallabhaneni Balashowry
- Party: JSP
- Alliance: NDA
- Elected year: 2024
- Preceded by: Konakalla Narayana Rao

Machilipatnam Lok Sabha constituency is one of the twenty-five lok sabha constituencies of Andhra Pradesh in India. It comprises seven assembly segments it belongs to Krishna district and NTR district.

== Assembly segments ==
Machilipatnam Lok Sabha constituency comprises the following Legislative Assembly segments:

#	Name	District	Member	Party	Leading (in 2024)
71	Gannavaram	Krishna/NTR	Yarlagadda Venkata Rao	TDP	JSP
72	Gudivada	Krishna	Venigandla Ramu	TDP	JSP
74	Pedana	Krishna	Kagitha Krishna Prasad	TDP	JSP
75	Machilipatnam	Krishna	Kollu Ravindra	TDP	JSP
76	Avanigadda	Krishna	Mandali Buddha Prasad	JSP	JSP
77	Pamarru(SC)	Krishna	Varla Kumar Raja	TDP	JSP
78	Penamaluru	Krishna	Bode Prasad	TDP	JSP

Source: Assembly segments of Parliamentary constituencies

== Members of Parliament ==
Year	Member	Party
1952	Sanaka Buchhikotaiah	Communist Party of India
1957	Mandali Venkata Krishna Rao	Indian National Congress
1962	Mandala Venkata Swamy Naidu	Independent
1967	Y. Ankineedu Prasad	Indian National Congress
1971	Nageswararao Meduri	Indian National Congress
1977	Maganti Ankineedu	Indian National Congress
1980	Maganti Ankineedu	Indian National Congress
1984	Kavuri Samba Siva Rao	Indian National Congress
1989	Kavuri Samba Siva Rao	Indian National Congress
1991	Kolusu Peda Reddaiah	Telugu Desam Party
1996	Kaikala Satyanarayana	Telugu Desam Party
1998	Kavuri Samba Siva Rao	Indian National Congress
1999	Ambati Brahmanaiah	Telugu Desam Party
2004	Badiga Ramakrishna	Indian National Congress
2009	Konakalla Narayana Rao	Telugu Desam Party
2014	Konakalla Narayana Rao	Telugu Desam Party
2019	Vallabhaneni Balashowry	YSR Congress Party
2024	Vallabhaneni Balashowry	Janasena Party

== Election results ==
=== General Election 1989 ===
General Election, 1989: Machilipatnam
Party	Candidate	Votes	%	±%
INC	Kavuri Samba Siva Rao	354,533	52.06	+2.22
TDP	Bopanna Gangadhara Chaudury	311,044	45.67	−2.50
Majority		43,489	6.39	
Turnout		680,994	76.99	+1.20
INC hold		Swing		

=== General Election 1991 ===
General Election, 1991: Machilipatnam
Party	Candidate	Votes	%	±%
TDP	Kolusu Peda Reddaiah Yadav	298,348	49.02	+3.35
INC	Kavuri Samba Siva Rao	271,026	44.53	−7.53
Majority		27,322	4.49	
Turnout		608,592	76.99	−7.99
TDP gain from INC		Swing		

=== General Election 1996 ===
General Election, 1996: Machilipatnam
Party	Candidate	Votes	%	±%
TDP	Kaikala Satyanarayana	275,713	39.57	−9.45
INC	Kolusu Peda Reddaiah Yadav	194,206	27.87	−16.66
Majority		81,507	11.70	
Turnout		696,785	69.50	+2.54
TDP hold		Swing		

=== General Election 1998 ===
General Election, 1998: Machilipatnam
Party	Candidate	Votes	%	±%
INC	Kavuri Samba Siva Rao	355,030	51.28	+23.41
TDP	Kaikala Satyanarayana	273,938	39.57	
Majority		81,092	11.71	
Turnout		692,370	69.69	+0.19
INC gain from TDP		Swing		

=== General Election 1999 ===
General Election, 1999: Machilipatnam
Party	Candidate	Votes	%	±%
TDP	Ambati Brahmanaiah	387,533	54.44	+14.87
INC	Kavuri Samba Siva Rao	304,537	42.78	−8.50
Majority		82,096	11.66	
Turnout		711,867	70.73	+1.04
TDP gain from INC		Swing		

=== General Election 2004 ===
General Election, 2004: Machilipatnam
Party	Candidate	Votes	%	±%
INC	Badiga Ramakrishna	387,127	51.25	+8.47
TDP	Ambati Brahmanaiah	336,786	44.59	−9.85
Independent	Subrahmanyeswara Yenduri Rao (Mani)	18,477	2.45	
Pyramid Party of India	Adapala Sivannarayana	6,201	0.82	−0.26
Independent	Dodda Kameswara Rao	4,297	0.57	
TRS	B S Rao	2,426	0.32	
Majority		50,341	6.66	
Turnout		755,314	76.06	+5.33
INC gain from TDP		Swing		

=== General Election 2009 ===
General Election, 2009: Machilipatnam
Party	Candidate	Votes	%	±%
TDP	Konakalla Narayana Rao	409,936	39.19	−5.40
INC	Badiga Ramakrishna	397,480	38.00	−13.25
PRP	C. Ramachandraiah	186,921	17.87	
Majority		12,456	1.19	
Turnout		1,045,905	83.60	+7.54
TDP gain from INC		Swing		

=== General Election 2014 ===
2014 Indian general elections: Machilipatnam
Party	Candidate	Votes	%	±%
TDP	Konakalla Narayana Rao	587,280	51.47	+12.28
YSRCP	Kolusu Parthasarathy	506,223	44.36	
INC	Sistla Ramesh	14,111	1.24	
NOTA	None of the Above	8,171	0.72	
JSP	Kammili Srinivas	7,692	0.67	
Majority		81,057	7.11	
Turnout		1,141,065	83.33	−0.27
TDP hold		Swing		

=== General Election 2019 ===
2019 Indian general elections: Machilipatnam
Party	Candidate	Votes	%	±%
YSRCP	Vallabhaneni Balashowry	571,436	46.02	
TDP	Konakalla Narayana Rao	511,295	41.18	
JSP	Bandreddy Ramu	113,292	9.12	
NOTA	None of the Above	14,077	1.13	
INC	Gollu Krishna	12,284	0.99	
Majority		60,141	4.84	
Turnout		1,245,552	84.54	
Registered electors		1,473,347		
YSRCP gain from TDP		Swing		

=== General Election 2024 ===
2024 Indian general elections: Machilipatnam
Party	Candidate	Votes	%	±%
JSP	Vallabhaneni Balashowry	724,439	55.22	
YSRCP	Simhadri Chandra Sekhar Rao	5,01,260	38.21	
INC	Gollu Krishna	31,825	2.43	
NOTA	None of the above	12,126	0.92	
Majority		2,23,179	17.01	
Turnout		13,15,489	85.42	
JSP gain from YSRCP		Swing		

== See also ==
- List of constituencies of the Andhra Pradesh Legislative Assembly
