= Devarakota =

- Interactive map of Devarakota
- Location in Andhra Pradesh, India Devarakota (India)
- Coordinates: 16.151865°N 80.944273°E
- Country: India
- State: Andhra Pradesh
- District: Krishna
- Mandal: Ghantasala

Area
  - Total: 3.24 km^{2} (1.25 sq mi)

Population (2011)
  - Total: 1,573
  - Density: 485/km^{2} (1,260/sq mi)

Languages
  - Official: Telugu
- Time zone: UTC+5:30 (IST)
- PIN: 521133
- Telephone code: +91–8671
- Vehicle registration: AP–06
- Nearest city: Machilipatnam
- Lok Sabha constituency: Machilipatnam
- Assembly constituency: Avanigadda

Devarakota is a village in Krishna district of the Indian state of Andhra Pradesh. It is located in Ghantasala mandal of Vijayawada revenue division. The village has been mentioned in the 2015 Mahesh Babu starrer Srimanthudu.

== Geography ==
Devarakota has an elevation of 11 m (36 ft).The village is located 22 km (14 mi) towards west from District Headquarters Machilipatnam and 3 km (1.9 mi) from Ghantasala.

== Demographics ==
As per 2011 census, the population was 1,573 residing in 483 households, divided into 803 males and 770 females.
