= Chodavaram, Nagayalanka mandal =

Chodavaram
- Village
- Interactive map of Chodavaram
- Location in Andhra Pradesh, India Chodavaram (India)
- Country: India
- State: Andhra Pradesh
- District: Krishna
- Mandal: Nagayalanka

Area
  - Total: 6.67 km^{2} (2.58 sq mi)

Population (2011)
  - Total: 1,242
  - Density: 186/km^{2} (482/sq mi)

Languages
  - Official: Telugu
- Time zone: UTC+5:30 (IST)
- PIN Code: 521120
- Telephone Code: +91–8671
- Vehicle registration: AP–16
- Lok Sabha constituency: Machilipatnam
- Vidhan Sabha constituency: Avanigadda

Chodavaram is a village in Krishna district of Indian state of Andhra Pradesh. It is located in Nagayalanka mandal of Machilipatnam revenue division.

== Geography ==
15.9500°N 80.9167°E. It has an average elevation of 10 metres (36 ft).
