= Vallabhaneni =

Vallabhaneni is a Telugu surname. Notable people with the surname include:

- Vallabhaneni Janardhan (1959–2022), Indian actor and filmmaker
- Vallabhaneni Balashowry (born 1968), Indian politician
- Vallabhaneni Maheedhar (born 1970), Indian actor
- Vallabhaneni Vamsi Mohan (born 1971), Indian politician
