= Varla Ramaiah =

Indian politician from Andhra Pradesh

- వర్ల రామయ్య

Member of Legislative Council Andhra Pradesh
- Incumbent
- Assumed office 19 August 2026
- Governor: S. Abdul Nazeer
- Constituency: Nominated

Personal details
- Born: 1 August 1951 (age 75) Andhra Pradesh, India
- Party: Telugu Desam Party
- Spouse: Jaya Prada
- Parent(s): Isaac (father); Navamma (mother)
- Education: Andhra University; Acharya Nagarjuna University
- Occupation: Politician
- Profession: Former police officer

Varla Ramaiah (born 1 August 1951) is an Indian politician from Andhra Pradesh and a leader of the Telugu Desam Party (TDP). He has held senior organisational positions in the TDP and has served as chairman of the Andhra Pradesh State Road Transport Corporation. He is a member of the TDP politburo. In August 2026, he was nominated as a member of the Andhra Pradesh Legislative Council by the Governor of Andhra Pradesh.

== Early life and education ==
Varla Ramaiah was born on 1 August 1951 to Isaac and Navamma. He earned a Bachelor of Arts degree from Andhra University in 1973 and a Bachelor of Laws degree from Acharya Nagarjuna University in 1993.

Before entering politics, Ramaiah worked as a police officer.

== Personal life ==
Ramaiah is married to Jaya Prada. They have a son, Varla Kumar Raja, who was elected as a member of the Andhra Pradesh Legislative Assembly from the Pamarru Assembly constituency in the 2024 Andhra Pradesh Legislative Assembly election.

== Political career ==
Ramaiah became active in the Telugu Desam Party, founded by N. T. Rama Rao in 1982. He subsequently held organisational responsibilities in the party and became one of its senior leaders.

Ramaiah has been associated with the organisational activities of the Telugu Desam Party for several years. He has served as a general secretary of the Telugu Desam Party and is currently a member of the party's politburo.

He has frequently represented the party in public statements and press conferences on political and administrative issues in Andhra Pradesh.

== Electoral career ==
Ramaiah contested the 2009 Indian general election from the Tirupati Lok Sabha constituency as a Telugu Desam Party candidate. He finished second, losing to Chinta Mohan of the Indian National Congress by 19,276 votes.

In the 2014 Andhra Pradesh Legislative Assembly election, Ramaiah contested the Pamarru Assembly constituency as a Telugu Desam Party candidate. He finished second, losing to Uppuleti Kalpana of the YSR Congress Party by 1,069 votes.

In 2020, he unsuccessfully contested the Rajya Sabha election as a TDP candidate.

On 19 August 2026, Governor of Andhra Pradesh S. Abdul Nazeer nominated Varla Ramaiah as a member of the Andhra Pradesh Legislative Council. Ramaiah subsequently took oath as a member of the Andhra Pradesh Legislative Council on 19 August 2026.

== Chairman of APSRTC ==
Ramaiah was appointed chairman of the Andhra Pradesh State Road Transport Corporation (APSRTC) in 2018. He assumed charge as chairman in May 2018.

During his tenure, he addressed issues concerning APSRTC employees and the functioning of the corporation.

== See also ==
- Telugu Desam Party
- Andhra Pradesh Legislative Council
- Andhra Pradesh State Road Transport Corporation
- Pamarru Assembly constituency
- Tirupati Lok Sabha constituency
- 2014 Andhra Pradesh Legislative Assembly election
