= Badiga Ramakrishna =

Indian politician

MP
- Preceded by: Ambati Brahmanaiah
- Succeeded by: Konakalla Narayana Rao
- Constituency: Machilipatnam

Personal details
- Born: 2 September 1942 (age 83) Vijayawada, Andhra Pradesh
- Party: Indian National Congress
- Spouse: B. Premalatha
- Children: 1 son and 3 daughters
- As of 12 May, 2006

Badiga Ramakrishna (born 2 September 1942) was a member of the 14th Lok Sabha of India. He represented the Machilipatnam constituency of Andhra Pradesh and is a member of the Indian National Congress. He was defeated by the TDP's BC Candidate Konakalla Narayana Rao in 2009 Lok sabha elections by a meager margin of 12000 votes in a multi sided contest, where in PRP, Loksatta, BJP fielded candidates from the Kapu community and polled more than 2 lakh votes.
