= Avanigadda Assembly constituency =

Constituency of the Andhra Pradesh Legislative Assembly, India

Coordinates: 16°01′12″N 80°54′36″E

Avanigadda
- Constituency No. 76 for the Andhra Pradesh Legislative Assembly
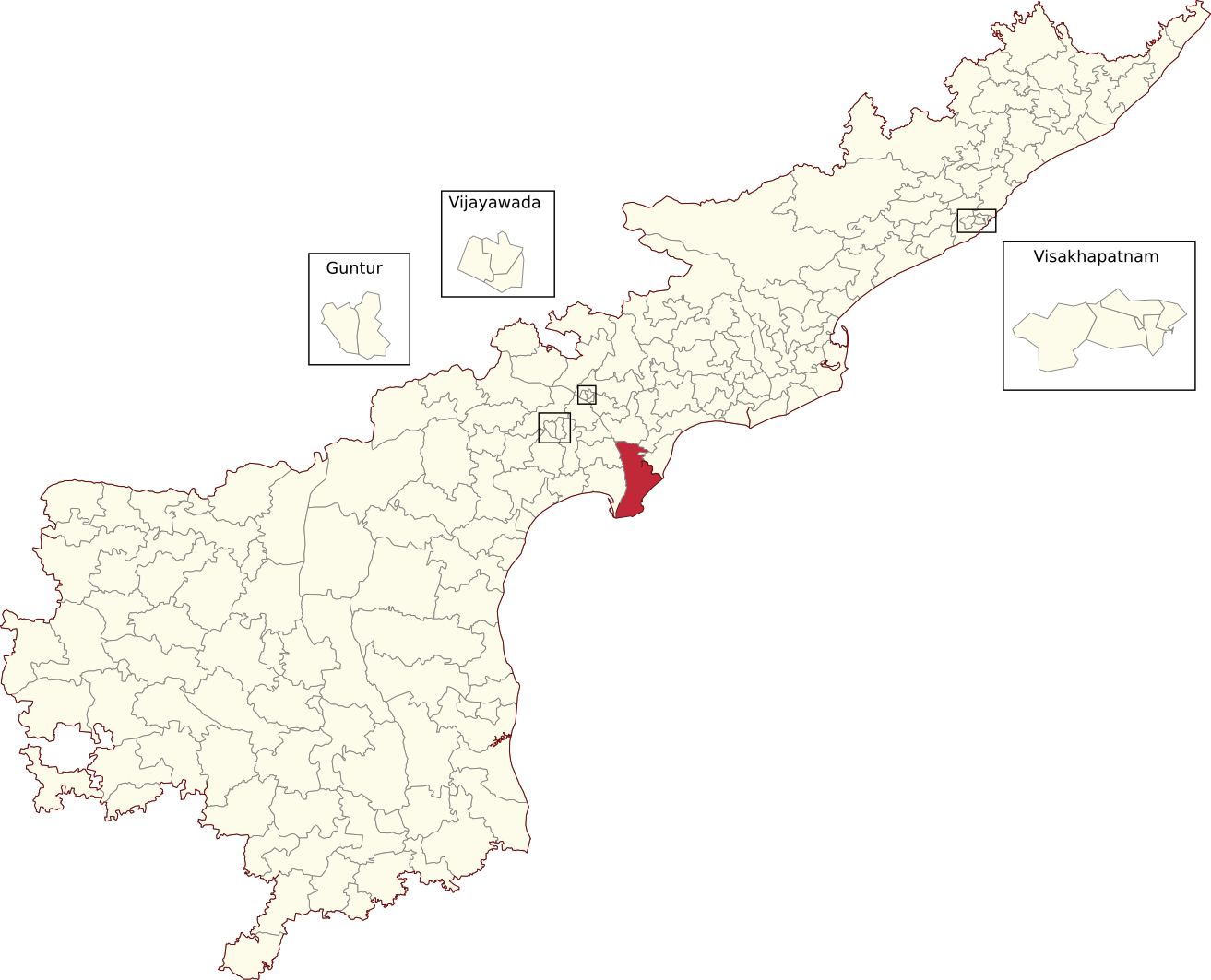
- Location of Avanigadda Assembly constituency within Andhra Pradesh

Constituency details
- Country: India
- Region: South India
- State: Andhra Pradesh
- District: Krishna
- Lok Sabha constituency: Machilipatnam
- Established: 1962
- Total electors: 207,240
- Reservation: None

Member of Legislative Assembly
- 16th Andhra Pradesh Legislative Assembly
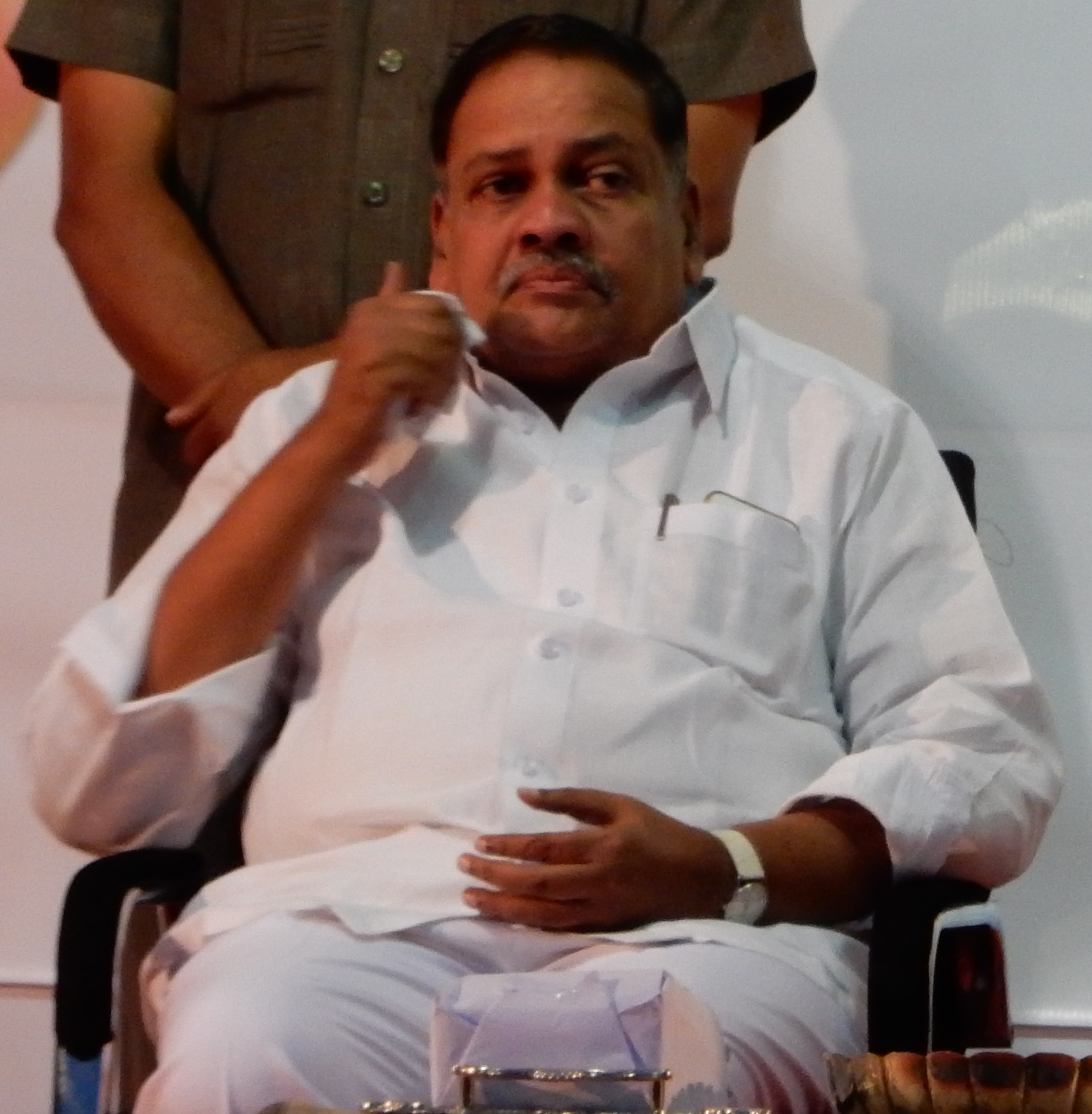
- Incumbent Mandali Buddha Prasad
- Party: JSP
- Alliance: NDA
- Elected year: 2024

Avanigadda Assembly constituency is a constituency in Krishna district of Andhra Pradesh that elects representatives to the Andhra Pradesh Legislative Assembly in India. It is one of the seven assembly segments of Machilipatnam Lok Sabha constituency.

Mandali Buddha Prasad is the current MLA of the constituency, having won the 2024 Andhra Pradesh Legislative Assembly election from Jana Sena Party. As of 25 March 2019, there are a total of 207,240 electors in the constituency. The constituency was established in 1962, as per the Delimitation Orders (1962).

== Mandals ==
The six mandals that form the assembly constituency are:

Mandal
Avanigadda
Nagayalanka
Koduru
Challapalli
Mopidevi
Ghantashala

== Members of the Legislative Assembly ==
Year	Member	Political party
1962	Yarlagadda Sivarama Prasad	Indian National Congress
1967	Yarlagadda Sivarama Prasad	Indian National Congress
1972	Mandali Venkata Krishna Rao	Indian National Congress
1978	Mandali Venkata Krishna Rao	Indian National Congress
1983	Mandali Venkata Krishna Rao	Indian National Congress
1985	Simhadri Satyanarayana Rao	Telugu Desam Party
1989	Simhadri Satyanarayana Rao	Telugu Desam Party
1994	Simhadri Satyanarayana Rao	Telugu Desam Party
1999	Mandali Buddha Prasad	Indian National Congress
2004	Mandali Buddha Prasad	Indian National Congress
2009	Ambati Brahmanaiah	Telugu Desam Party
2013 by-election	Ambati Srihari Prasad	Telugu Desam Party
2014	Mandali Buddha Prasad	Telugu Desam Party
2019	Simhadri Ramesh Babu	YSR Congress Party
2024	Mandali Buddha Prasad	Janasena Party

== Election results ==
=== 2004 ===
2004 Andhra Pradesh Legislative Assembly election: Avanigadda
Party	Candidate	Votes	%	±%
INC	Mandali Buddha Prasad	41,511	45.96	−2.01
TDP	Burugadda Ramesh Naidu	33,029	36.57	−10.49
Majority		8,482	9.39	
Turnout		90,322	78.94	▲4.43
INC hold		Swing		

=== 2009 ===
2009 Andhra Pradesh Legislative Assembly election: Avanigadda
Party	Candidate	Votes	%	±%
TDP	Ambati Brahmanaiah	55,316	34.46	−2.11
INC	Mandali Buddha Prasad	54,899	34.20	−11.76
PRP	Simhadri Ramesh Babu	37,660	23.46	New
Majority		417	0.26	
Turnout		160,533	86.74	▲7.80
TDP gain from INC		Swing		

=== 2014 ===
2014 Andhra Pradesh Legislative Assembly election: Avanigadda
Party	Candidate	Votes	%	±%
TDP	Mandali Buddha Prasad	80,995	48.14	
YSRCP	Simhadri Ramesh Babu	75,037	44.60	
Majority		5,958	3.54	
Turnout		168,232	85.70	▼1.04
TDP hold		Swing		

=== 2019 ===
2019 Andhra Pradesh Legislative Assembly election: Avanigadda
Party	Candidate	Votes	%	±%
YSRCP	Simhadri Ramesh Babu	78,447	42.54	
TDP	Mandali Buddha Prasad	57,722	31.30	
JSP	Muttamsetty Krishna Rao	28,556	15.49	
Majority		20,725		
Turnout		1,64,765	88.11	▲2.41
YSRCP gain from TDP		Swing		

=== 2024 ===
2024 Andhra Pradesh Legislative Assembly election: Avanigadda
Party	Candidate	Votes	%	±%
JSP	Mandali Buddha Prasad	113,460	60.85	
YSRCP	Simhadri Ramesh Babu	67,026	35.95	
INC	Andee Srirama Murthy	1,068	0.57	
NOTA	None Of The Above	1,952	1.05	
Majority		46,434	24.9	
Turnout		1,86,445		
JSP gain from YSRCP		Swing		

== See also ==
- List of constituencies of the Andhra Pradesh Legislative Assembly
