= Integrated Test Range =

Indian defence laboratory

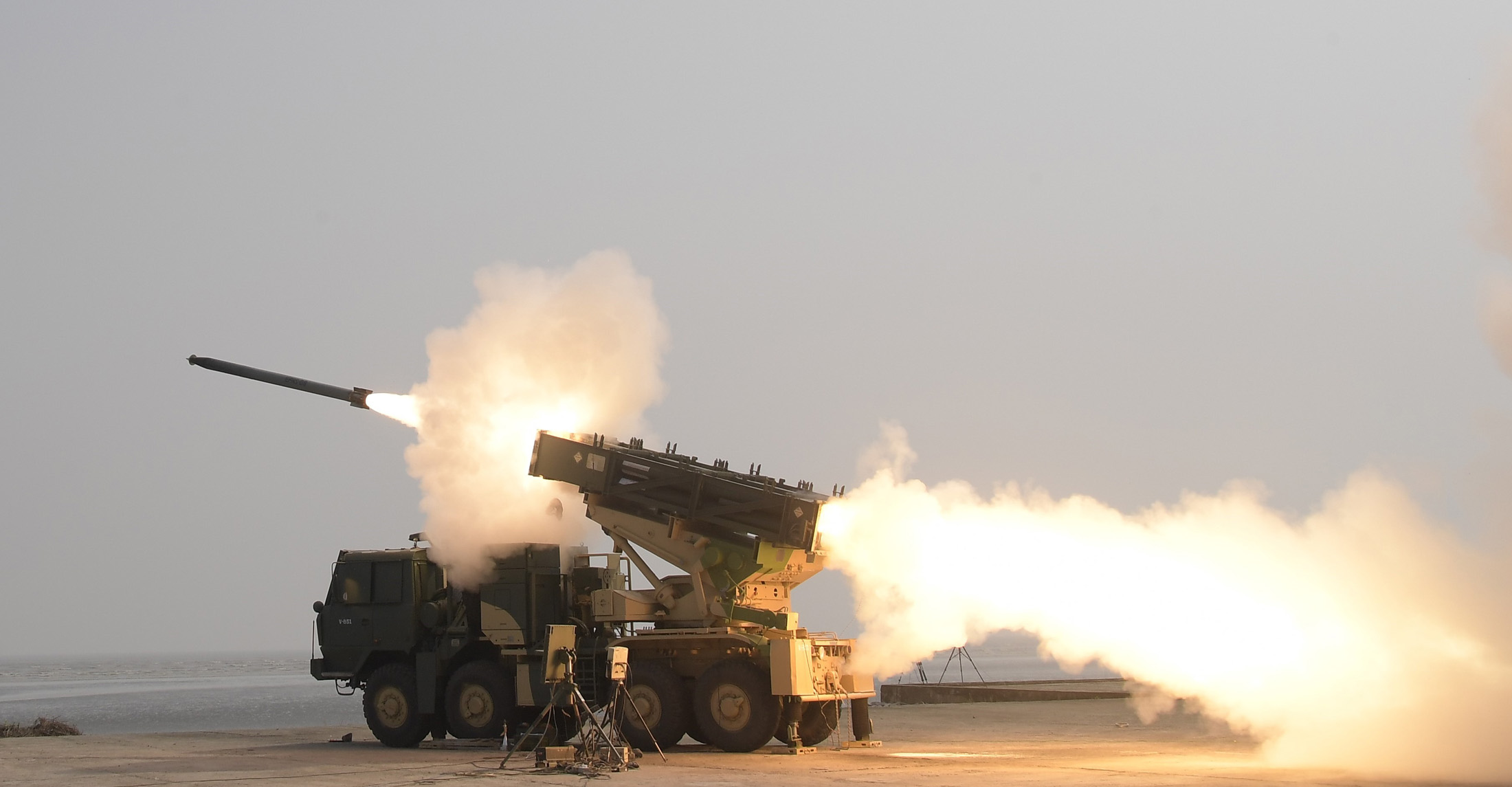
- Launch Complex-III (LC-III), Chandipur hosting the trials of Pinaka multiple rocket systems.
- Established: 1982
- Director: Shri K Suchendar
- Location: Balasore, Odisha, India; 21.437°N 87.016°E
- Operating agency: Defence Research and Development Organisation
- Website: https://www.drdo.gov.in/labs-and-establishments/integrated-test-range-itr

The Integrated Test Range (ITR) is a test and evaluation (T&E) centre of India's Defence Research and Development Organisation (DRDO). Located in Balasore, Odisha, it provides safe and reliable launch facilities for performance evaluation of rockets, missiles and air-borne weapon system. The present director of ITR is Shri K Suchendar.

== History ==
The Integrated Test Range (ITR) is a missile testing facility composed of two complexes - Launch Complex-IV (LC-IV) located on Abdul Kalam Island and Launch Complex-III (LC-III) located at Chandipur, Balasore district.

On 25 February 2025, DRDO and the Indian Navy successfully conducted flight trials of a first-of-its-kind naval antiship missile (NASM-SR) that has ‘Man-in-Loop’ features, which is unique as it gives the capability of inflight targeting.

== Other test ranges ==
On 10 October 2024, the Cabinet Committee on Security approved the proposal for the establishment of a new missile testing range in Nagayalanka region in Andhra Pradesh. This will likely be the revival of the Machilipatnam Test Range Project.

As of April 2024, the Defence Research and Development Organisation (DRDO) is working to establish a missile test range near Junput, Purba Medinipur district in West Bengal. The location is 177 km from Kolkata, 40 km from Digha and 70 km from Chandipur. The Range will cover an area of 8.73 acres. The project received approval from the Ministry of Environment, Forest and Climate Change. In September 2026, it was confirmed that the project received approval from the state government. This would be the third weapons and missile test range for DRDO after the Integrated Test Range and the recently approved Machilipatnam Test Range.
