= Mandali Buddha Prasad =

Indian politician

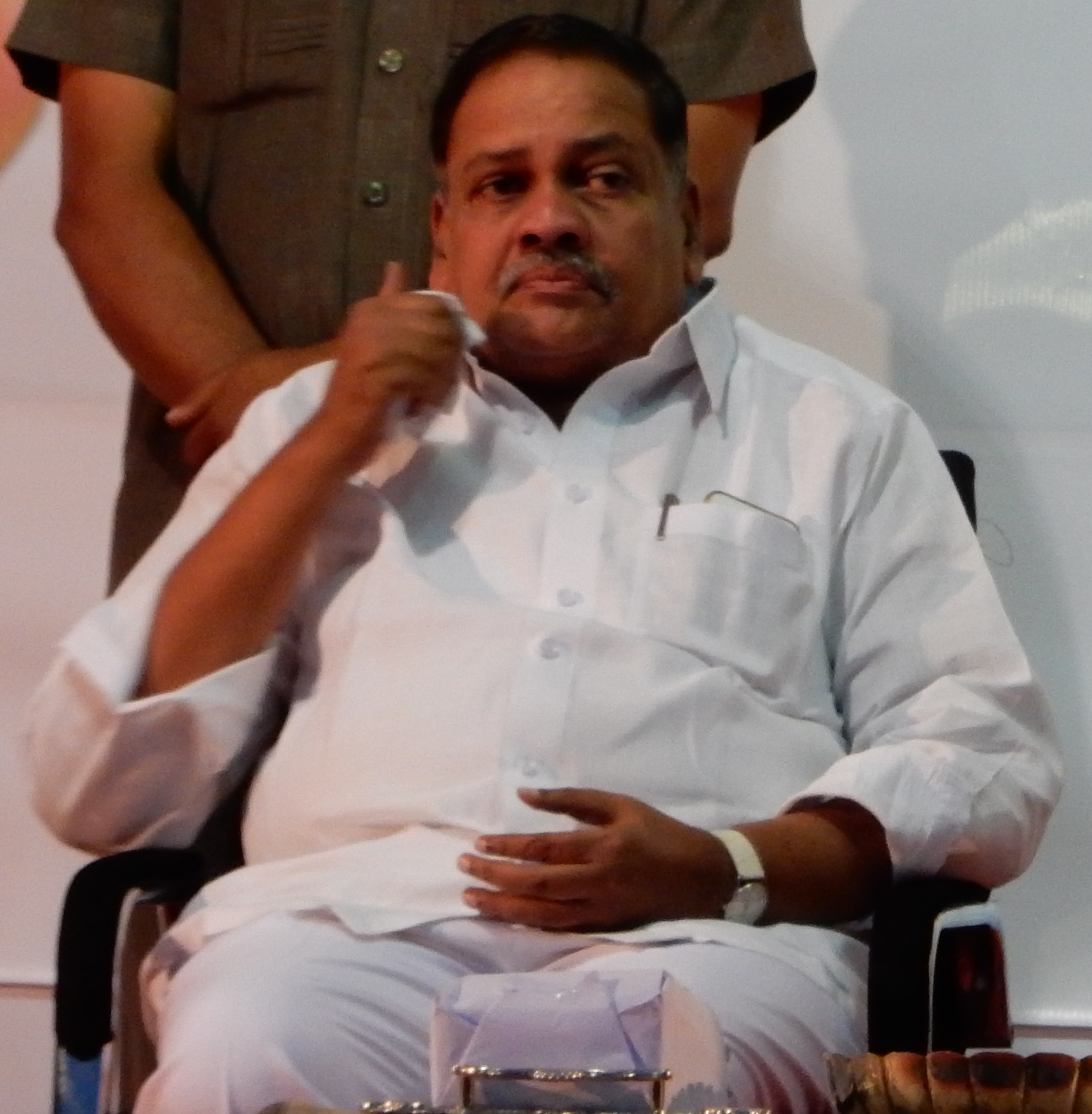
- Prasad in August 2015

20th Deputy Speaker of the Andhra Pradesh Legislative Assembly
- In office 28 June 2014 – 29 May 2019
- Governor: E. S. L. Narasimhan
- Chief Minister: N. Chandrababu Naidu
- Preceded by: Mallu Bhatti Vikramarka
- Succeeded by: Kona Raghupathi

Minister of Fisheries, Animal Husbandry and Dairy Development, Government of Andhra Pradesh
- In office 27 April 2007 – 20 May 2009
- Governor: Rameshwar Thakur; N. D. Tiwari
- Chief Minister: Y. S. Rajasekhara Reddy
- Succeeded by: Kolusu Parthasarathy

Member of Legislative Assembly, Andhra Pradesh
- Incumbent
- Assumed office 4 June 2024
- Preceded by: Simhadri Ramesh Babu
- Constituency: Avanigadda
- In office 2014–2019
- Preceded by: Ambati Srihari
- Succeeded by: Simhadri Ramesh Babu
- Constituency: Avanigadda
- In office 1999–2009
- Preceded by: Simhadri Satyanarayana Rao
- Succeeded by: Ambati Brahmanaiah
- Constituency: Avanigadda

Personal details
- Born: 26 May 1956 (age 70) Nagayalanka, Andhra State, India
- Party: Jana Sena Party (since 2024)
- Other political affiliations: Telugu Desam Party (2014–2024); Indian National Congress (until 2014)
- Spouse: Vijaya Lakshmi
- Children: 2 daughters, 1 son

Mandali Buddha Prasad (born 26 May 1956) is an Indian politician and former Deputy Speaker of Andhra Pradesh, India. He is a staunch follower of Gandhian principles and a leader with Service motto and national outlook. Especially, he is known for his love and affection for Telugu language and Culture and for his unstinted efforts for their development and also for the welfare of Telugu people living all over the world.

== Birth and Education ==
He was born to Sri Mandali Venkata Krishna Rao, Prabhavathi Devi on 26 May 1956 at Nagayalanka, Krishna District, Andhra Pradesh. His father Sri Mandali Venkata Krishna Rao was a staunch follower of Gandhian Philosophy and a social worker. After completing his primary and high school education at Avanigadda, Krishna District, Sri Buddha Prasad graduated from Osmania University, Hyderabad.

== As an M.L.A. ==
He was elected as a Member of the Andhra Pradesh Legislative Assembly from Avanigadda Constituency of Krishna District for four terms during 1999, 2004, 2014 and 2024 and could get sanctions of 700.00 crores for the development works in the constituency as on date.

== As a Cabinet Minister ==
He dealt with the portfolio of Animal Husbandry, Dairy Development and Fisheries during 2007–2009. As a cabinet minister he has formulated many innovative schemes like 'Pashukranthi' to benefit poor people and small farmers with hybrid animals on subsidy rates and "Matsya Kranti" by which fisheries women are benefitted.

He established an Advanced Research Centre of Animal Husbandry with International standards at Pulivendula, Kadapa District and three super specialty Veterinary Hospitals each one at Hyderabad, Vijayawada and Pulivendula. A Fisheries Polytechnic College is established at Bhavadevarapally, Krishna District.

== Development of Krishna District ==
Sri Mandali Buddha Prasad is in the forefront of the development of Krishna District, which is his native district. He was instrumental for modernization of Krishna Delta, construction of Puligadda–Penumudi bridge and Puligadda–Vijayawada river bund road. He played an important role for the establishment of Krishna University at Machilipatnam. As the convener of Krishna Delta Protection Committee, he led many movements for water supply to Krishna Delta for Irrigation purpose. For this cause, he underwent a seven-day hunger strike in September, 2004. He played a prominent role for sanction of Pulichintala - Polavaram Project.

== Social service ==
In the 1977 Andhra Pradesh cyclone, nearly 10,000 people lost their lives. There were no traces of certain villages. He not only served the victims day and night but also worked as a secretary of The Deena Jana Samkshema Samithi and sheltered 120 orphan children and gave them food and education.

During the tsunami that hit the coastal districts of Andhra Pradesh in 2005, rescue centres were established for the protection of coastal area with the co-operation of voluntary organizations. Whenever some natural calamity occurs, he used to stay with the victims and inculcated in them the confidence and took up the relief and rehabilitation programs.

== Gandhian ==
His father Sri Mandali Venkata Krishna Rao established Gandhi Kshetram at Avanigadda during the year 1969 on the occasion of Gandhi Centenary Celebrations. Thus, he injected Gandhian principles from his childhood itself and he is striving hard to propagate them all along. He ran a monthly magazine "Gandhi Kshetram" for twelve years to propagate the Gandhian Principles.

To inculcate the Gandhian Principles in the youth, he conducted several workshops. Smt. Nirmala Gandhi, daughter-in-law of Mahatma Gandhi, Sri. Kanu Gandhi, grandson of Mahatma Gandhi and followers of Mahatma Gandhi like Prabhakarji, Prof. N. G. Ranga and Sri Vavilala Gopala Krishnaiah participated in these workshops and commended his work.

He also worked as a Secretary of Gandhian Institute of Social Services. He visited "Ponar Ashram", met Acharya Vinobha Bhave and got his blessings.

== Cultural field ==
He has been rendering yeoman services for the renaissance and to rejuvenate Telugu Culture. He took up several responsibilities in several activities.

- Conducted Krishna Mahotsavams and installed bronze statue of Sri Krishna Devaraya at Srikakulam in Krishna District.
- Conducted Divi Mahotsavams in Krishna District
- Made efforts to develop the tomb of C P Brown in England with the help of London Telugu Association.
- President - First International Kuchipudi Dance Festival held in Cupertino, USA in 2008
- Vice President and Chairman of Co-ordination Committee of 4th World Telugu Conference in 2012 at Tirupathi
- Chairman - World Telugu History Conference in London in 2013

== Writer ==
He has been contributing a number of articles on contemporary issues, Telugu language and culture to many leading newspapers and magazines.

Few of his publications are:

- Mauritius lo Telugu Tejam
- Prajalu - Pragathi
- England lo Telugu Vaibhava Smruthulu

== Political timeline ==
List taken from telaganadu.com:

- Executive Member of the Krishna District Youth Congress Committee (1977–1985)
- President, Avanigadda Mandal Congress Committee (1987–1989)
- President, Krishna District Congress Committee (1989–2001)
- Joint Secretary, A.P.C.C. (1990–1997)
- General Secretary, A.P.C.C. (1997)
- Member, AICC (1992–2013)
- Joined Telugu Desam Party (2014)
- Joined Janasena Party (2024)

== Offices held ==
List taken from telaganadu.com:

Public offices held

- Deputy Speaker - Andhra Pradesh (June 2014 – Present)
- Andhra Pradesh Official Language Commission (2013 - 2014).
- Served as Minister for Animal Husbandry, Dairy Development & Fisheries (2007–2009).
- Elected as M.L.A., from Avanigadda in 1999, 2004 and 2014 elections.
- Member - Public Accounts Committee, 2004 Member – Delimitation Commission, 2005
