= China Kallepalle =

Chinnakallepalli
- Village
- Interactive map of Chinnakallepalli
- Location in Andhra Pradesh, India Chinnakallepalli (India)
- Coordinates: 16.169649°N 80.883437°E
- Country: India
- State: Andhra Pradesh

Population (2011)
  - Total: 1,244

Languages
  - Official: Telugu
- Time zone: UTC+5:30 (IST)
- Vehicle registration: AP

China Kallepalle is a village in Ghantasala mandal, in the Krishna District of the Indian state of Andhra Pradesh.
