= Venkata Swamy =

Venkata Swamy or Venkataswamy is an Indian male given name. Notable people with the name include:

- Dwaram Venkataswamy Naidu (1893–1964), Indian violinist
- G. Venkatswamy (1929–2014), Indian politician
- Mandala Venkata Swamy Naidu, Indian politician
