= Gudivada Assembly constituency =

Constituency of the Andhra Pradesh Legislative Assembly, India

Coordinates: 16.43°N 80.99°E

Gudivada
- Constituency No. 72 for the Andhra Pradesh Legislative Assembly
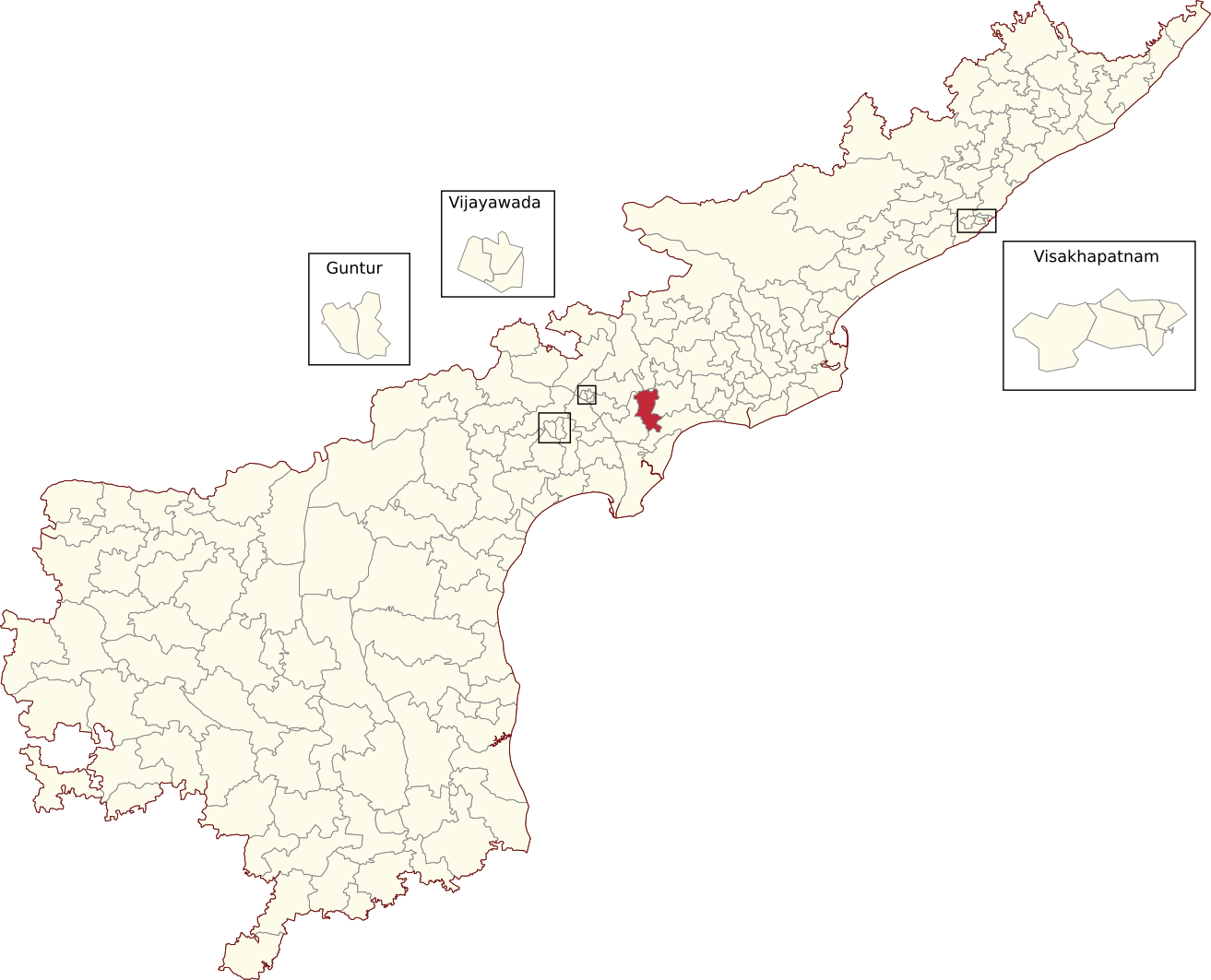
- Location of Gudivada Assembly constituency within Andhra Pradesh

Constituency details
- Country: India
- Region: South India
- State: Andhra Pradesh
- District: Krishna
- Lok Sabha constituency: Machilipatnam
- Established: 1951
- Total electors: 208,305
- Reservation: None

Member of Legislative Assembly
- 16th Andhra Pradesh Legislative Assembly
- Incumbent Venigandla Ramu
- Party: TDP
- Alliance: NDA
- Elected year: 2024

Gudivada Assembly constituency is a constituency in Krishna district of Andhra Pradesh that elects representatives to the Andhra Pradesh Legislative Assembly in India. It is one of the seven assembly segments of Machilipatnam Lok Sabha constituency.

Most successful political parties
1. INC (4 terms) (20.0%)
2. TDP (9 terms) (45.0%)
3. INC(I) (2 terms) (10.0%)
4. CPI (3 terms) (15.0%)
5. YSRCP (2 terms) (10.0%)

Venigandla Ramu is the current MLA of the constituency, having won the 2024 Andhra Pradesh Legislative Assembly election from Telugu Desam Party. As of 2019, there are a total of 208,305 electors in the constituency. The constituency was established in 1951, as per the Delimitation Orders (1951).

== Mandals ==
The three mandals that form the assembly constituency are:

Mandal
Gudivada
Gudlavalleru
Nandivada

== Member of the Legislative Assembly ==
Year	Member	Political party
1952	Gungi Rama Rao	Communist Party of India
1955	Vemula Kurmayya	Indian National Congress
1962	Gungi Rama Rao	Communist Party of India
1967	Musunuri Kasthuri Devi	Indian National Congress
1969	Yerneni Subramanyam	Indian National Congress
1972	Katari Satyanarayana Rao	Indian National Congress (I)
1978	Katari Satyanarayana Rao	Indian National Congress (I)
1983	Nandamuri Taraka Rama Rao	Telugu Desam Party
1985	Nandamuri Taraka Rama Rao	Telugu Desam Party
1985^	Raavi Sobhanadri Chowdary	Telugu Desam Party
1989	Katari Eswar Kumar	Indian National Congress
1994	Raavi Sobhanadri Chowdary	Telugu Desam Party
1999	Raavi Hari Gopal	Telugu Desam Party
2000^	Raavi Venkateswara Rao	Telugu Desam Party
2004	Kodali Sri Venkateswara Rao (Nani)	Telugu Desam Party
2009	Kodali Sri Venkateswara Rao (Nani)	Telugu Desam Party
2014	Kodali Sri Venkateswara Rao (Nani)	YSR Congress Party
2019	Kodali Sri Venkateswara Rao (Nani)	YSR Congress Party
2024	Venigandla Ramu	Telugu Desam Party

^ indicates by-election

== Election results ==
=== 1952 ===
1952 Madras Legislative Assembly election: Gudivada
Party	Candidate	Votes	%	±%
CPI	Gungi Rama Rao	63,915	26.63%	
CPI	Katragadda Rajagopala Rao	59,382	24.74%	
Independent	A. Gopalakrisahnayya	25,555	10.65%	
INC	Mangalagiri Ramadasu	20,087	8.37%	8.37%
INC	V. Seethamahalakshamamma	16,884	7.03%	7.03%
Independent	Pinnamaneni Lingayya	13,161	5.48%	
RPI	Tikambaram	8,944	3.73%	
Independent	Kakollu Raghavalu	8,742	3.64%	
Independent	M. Satgyanarayana Sastri	8,445	3.52%	
Independent	Done Tatayya	5,406	2.25%	
KMPP	D. Venkateswara Rao	4,062	1.69%	
Margin of victory		4,533	1.89%	
Turnout		2,40,040	149.34%	
Registered electors		1,60,730		
CPI win (new seat)				

=== 1999 ===
1999 Andhra Pradesh Legislative Assembly election: Gudivada
Party	Candidate	Votes	%	±%
TDP	Raavi Hari Gopal	43,126	41.8	
INC	Segu Venkateswarlu	26,180	25.4	
Independent	Eswara Kumar Katari	18,936	18.4	
ATDP	Nandamuri Harikrishna	11,238	10.9	new
Majority		16,946	15.6	
Turnout		108,300	66.7	
TDP hold		Swing		

=== 2004 ===
2004 Andhra Pradesh Legislative Assembly election: Gudivada
Party	Candidate	Votes	%	±%
TDP	Kodali Sri Venkateswara Rao (Nani)	57,845	52.59	▲10.79
INC	Eswar Kumar Katari	48,981	44.53	▲19.13
Majority		8,864	8.06	
Turnout		109,988	69.61	▲6.10
TDP hold		Swing		

=== 2009 ===
2009 Andhra Pradesh Legislative Assembly election: Gudivada
Party	Candidate	Votes	%	±%
TDP	Kodali Sri Venkateswara Rao (Nani)	68,034	46.00	▼6.59
INC	Pinnamaneni Venkateswara Rao	50,404	34.10	▼10.43
PRP	Raavi Venkateswara Rao	28,328	19.85	▲19.85
Majority		17,630	11.90	
Turnout		147,866	81.89	▲12.28
TDP hold		Swing		

=== 2014 ===
2014 Andhra Pradesh Legislative Assembly election: Gudivada
Party	Candidate	Votes	%	±%
YSRCP	Kodali Sri Venkateswara Rao (Nani)	81,298	55.32	▲55.32%
TDP	Raavi Venkateswara Rao	69,761	44.03	▼1.97%
Majority		11,537	7.29	
Turnout		158,428	80.29	▼1.60
YSRCP gain from TDP		Swing		

=== 2019 ===
2019 Andhra Pradesh Legislative Assembly election: Gudivada
Party	Candidate	Votes	%	±%
YSRCP	Kodali Sri Venkateswara Rao (Nani)	89,833	53.50	▼1.82
TDP	Devineni Avinash	70,354	41.90	▼2.13
NOTA	None of the above	3,285	1.96	new
Majority		19,479	9.6	
Turnout		167,902	80.6	▼0.31
YSRCP hold		Swing		

=== 2024 ===
2024 Andhra Pradesh Legislative Assembly election: Gudivada
Party	Candidate	Votes	%	±%
TDP	Venigandla Ramu	120,980	34.08	▲22.18
YSRCP	Kodali Sri Venkateswara Rao(Nani)	56000	33.18	▼20.32
NOTA	Ramu	1	0.58	
Majority		53,040	30.9	
Turnout		1,71,604		
TDP gain from YSRCP		Swing		

== See also ==
- List of constituencies of the Andhra Pradesh Legislative Assembly
