= Simhadri Ramesh Babu =

Indian politicians

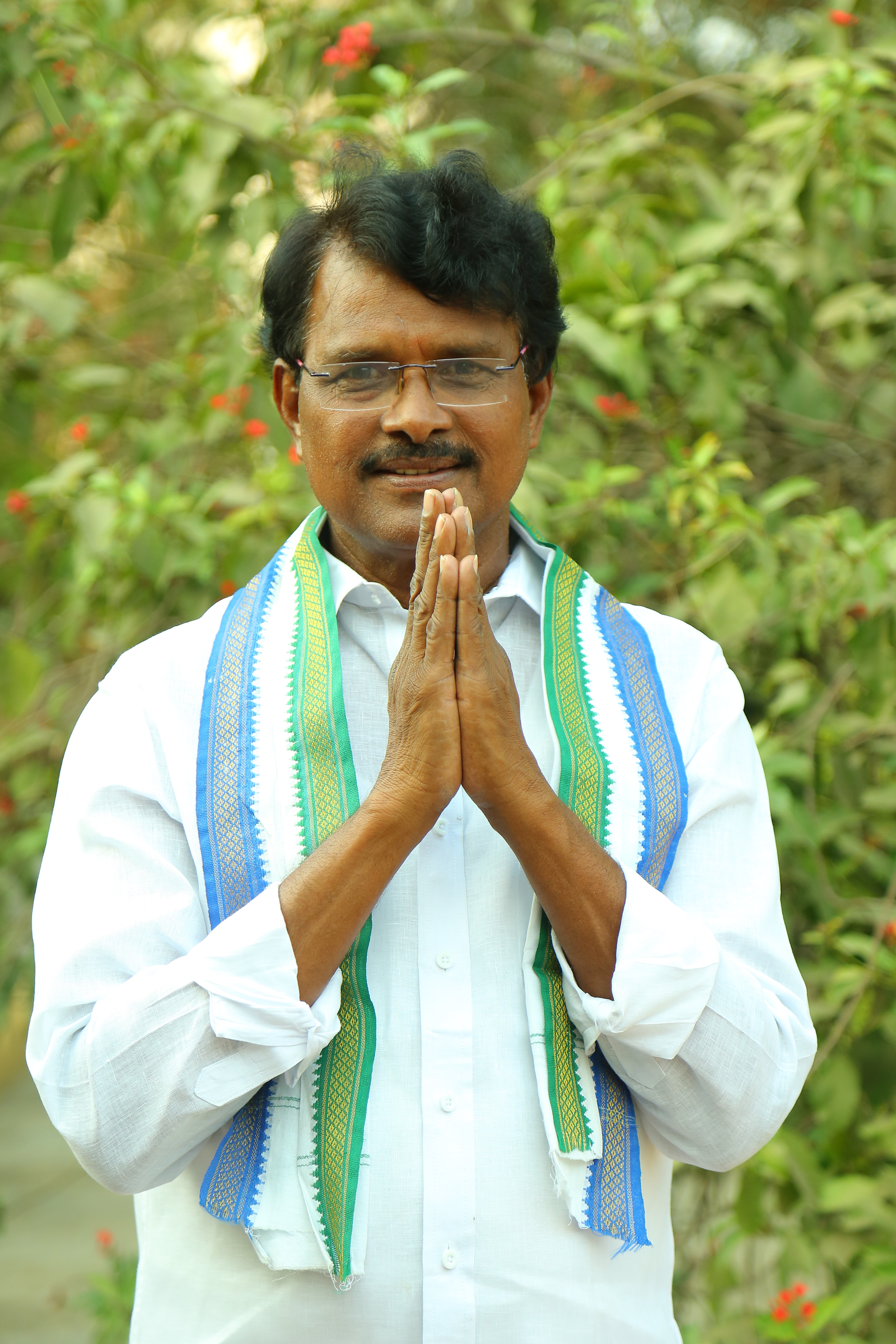

Member of Legislative Assembly Andhra Pradesh
- In office 2019–2024
- Preceded by: Mandali Buddha Prasad
- Succeeded by: Mandali Buddha Prasad
- Constituency: Avanigadda

Personal details
- Born: 22 July 1956 (age 69) Avanigadda, Krishna District, Andhra Pradesh, India
- Party: YSR Congress Party (2013 – present)
- Other political affiliations: Praja Rajyam Party (2008-2013)
- Spouse: Lakshmi

Simhadri Ramesh Babu is an Indian politician and member of the Andhra Pradesh Legislative Assembly. He has represented the Avanigadda Assembly constituency since 2019.
