= Ghantasala mandal =

Ghantasala
- Mandal
- Interactive map of Ghantasala
- Location in Andhra Pradesh, India
- Coordinates: 16°10′9.62″N 80°56′39.38″E
- Country: India
- State: Andhra Pradesh
- District: Krishna
- Headquarters: Ghantasala

Government
  - Body: Mandal Parishad

Area
  - Total: 118.53 km^{2} (45.76 sq mi)

Population (2011)
  - Total: 40,098
  - Density: 338.29/km^{2} (876.18/sq mi)

Languages
  - Official: Telugu
- Time zone: UTC+5:30 (IST)
- Vehicle registration: AP 16

Ghantasala mandal is one of the 25 mandals in the Krishna district of the Indian state of Andhra Pradesh. The headquarters of this mandal is located in the town of Ghantasala.

== Geography ==
The mandal is bordered by Pamidimukkala and Movva to the north, Guduru mandal to the east, Mopidevi mandal to the south, and Krishna River to the west.

== Demographics ==
As at the 2011 census, the population was 40,098 people residing in 12,946 households, divided into 20,182 males and 19,916 females, for a gender ratio of 987 females per 1000 males. 3,251 children were 0–6 years, of which 1,783 were boys and 1,468 were girls for a gender ratio of 823 females per 1000 males. The average literacy rate stands at 73.85%. 14,693 residents were members of Scheduled Castes and 1,155 of Scheduled Tribes.

== Economy ==
In 2011, the Census of India reported that 21,664 citizens were engaged in work activities including 12,566 were males and 9,105 females. 19,547 workers described their occupations, including 2,277 cultivators, 13,391 agricultural laborers, 927 in the household industry, and 2,952 with other types of work. In the last group, 2,124 were marginal workers.

== Administration ==
The mandal is administered under the Avanigadda Assembly constituency of the Machilipatnam Lok Sabha constituency. It is one of the 7 mandals in Vuyyuru revenue division.

== Towns and villages ==
As of 2011 census, 22 settlements were in Ghantasala mandal. Ghantasala is the largest and Birudugadda is the smallest in population.

The settlements in the mandal are:

1. Birudugadda
2. Bollapadu
3. Chilakalapudi
4. China Kallepalle
5. Chitturpu
6. Chitturu
7. Daliparru
8. Devarakota
9. Elikala Kuduru
10. Endakuduru
11. Ghantasala
12. Kodali
13. Kothapalle
14. Lankapalle
15. Mallampalle
16. Pushadam
17. Srikakulam
18. Tadepalle
19. Teluguraopalem
20. Vrudravaram
21. Vemulapalle

== Education ==
Ghantasala mandal plays a major role in education for rural students of nearby villages. Primary and secondary school education is imparted by government, aided by private schools under the School Education Department. For the academic year 2015–16, the mandal had more than 2,489 students enrolled in over 56 schools.

== See also ==
- List of mandals in Andhra Pradesh
- Vijayawada
