= Kodali Nani =

Indian politician

Kodali Sri Venkateswara Rao

Member of Legislative Assembly Andhra Pradesh
- In office 2004–2024
- Chief Minister: Y. S. Jagan Mohan Reddy
- Preceded by: Raavi Venkateswara Rao
- Succeeded by: Venigandla Ramu
- Constituency: Gudivada

Minister for Civil Supplies and Consumer Affairs Government of Andhra Pradesh
- In office 8 June 2019 – 7 April 2022
- Governor: E. S. L. Narasimhan; Biswabhusan Harichandan
- Preceded by: Prathipati Pulla Rao
- Succeeded by: Karumuri Venkata Nageswara Rao

Personal details
- Born: Kodali Sri Venkateswara Rao
- Citizenship: Indian
- Party: YSR Congress Party (2012–present)
- Other political affiliations: Telugu Desam Party (2004–2012)
- Occupation: Politician
- Nickname: Kodali Nani

Kodali Sri Venkateswara Rao (commonly known as Nani) is an Indian politician. He is a former member of the Andhra Pradesh Legislative Assembly (MLA). He represented the Gudivada assembly constituency from 2004 to 2024 in the Andhra Pradesh Legislative assembly. He previously served as the Minister for Civil Supplies and Consumer Affairs in the state of Andhra Pradesh.

== Political career ==
=== As Member of Legislative Assembly ===
- In the 2004 and 2009 Andhra Pradesh Legislative assembly elections, Nani contested as a member of Telugu Desam Party and won as the Member of Legislative Assembly (MLA). with majority of 8862 & 17630 votes respectively.
- In 2012, Nani departed from Telugu Desam Party and joined the YSR Congress Party.
- In the 2014 Andhra Pradesh Legislative assembly elections, Nani won as Member of Legislative Assembly (MLA). with majority of 11537 votes.
- In the 2019 Andhra Pradesh Legislative Assembly elections, Nani won again in Gudivada constituency against Devineni Avinash with a majority of 19,479 votes.
- In the 2024 Andhra Pradesh Legislative assembly elections, Nani has contested from YSRCP and lost in the election with 53040 votes in the Gudivada Assembly constituency.

=== As Minister ===
- In 2019, Nani took the oath as the Minister for Civil Supplies and Consumer Affairs on 8 June and served in the position until 7 April 2022.

=== Conviction ===
As per ADR report 2019, he was convicted in IPC Sections – 152, 353, 426 on 30 July 2012 and sentenced to undergo RI for a period of one year and pay fine of Rs. 1000/- u/s 353 and Rs. 1000/- u/s 426. There are 3 pending cases under 15 different IPC sections against him. He declared total assets of Rs. 14,82,19,33 in an affidavit filed by him during 2019 AP Assembly elections.

In 2021, the Andhra Pradesh State Election Commission served a show-cause notice to him seeking an explanation for his remarks on the election commissioner in derogatory terms.

== Filmography ==
As a producer
Year	Film	Cast
2004	Samba	Jr. NTR, Genelia D'Souza, Bhumika Chawla
