= Tandur Test Range =

Test range built by DRDO

The Tandur Test Range is an outdoor trial field being built by the Indian Defence Research and Development Organisation (DRDO) for the development of electronic warfare systems.

== Location ==
It is spread over an area of 8000 acres of land. It is located in the Tandur district of Telangana, 135 km away from Hyderabad.

== Operational date ==
The project is being set up with a planned investment of Rs 500 Crores. As of 2010 it was expected to be operational in 2013 and will test communication electronic warfare systems.

== See also ==
- Pashan Test Range
- Ramgarh Test Range
- Chitradurga Aeronautical Test Range
