= Chitturpu =

- Village
- Interactive map of Chitturpu
- Location in Andhra Pradesh, India Chitturpu (India)
- Coordinates: 16°09′00″N 80°54′45″E
- Country: India
- State: Andhra Pradesh
- District: Krishna

Area
  - Total: 6.09 km^{2} (2.35 sq mi)

Population (2011)
  - Total: 2,501
  - Density: 411/km^{2} (1,060/sq mi)

Languages
  - Official: Telugu
- Time zone: UTC+5:30 (IST)

Chitturpu is a village in Krishna district of the Indian state of Andhra Pradesh. It is located in Ghantasala mandal of Vijayawada revenue division. It is one of the villages in the mandal to be a part of Andhra Pradesh Capital Region.
