= Vallabhaneni Balashowry =

Indian politician

Member of Parliament, Lok Sabha
- Incumbent
- Assumed office 2019
- Preceded by: Konakalla Narayana Rao
- Constituency: Machilipatnam
- In office 2004–2009
- Preceded by: Ummareddy Venkateswarlu
- Succeeded by: Constituency abolished
- Constituency: Tenali

Personal details
- Born: 18 September 1968 (age 57) Morjampadu, Guntur, Andhra Pradesh
- Party: Janasena Party (since 2024)
- Other political affiliations: YSR Congress Party (2014–2024); Indian National Congress (until 2014)
- Spouse: Bhanumathi
- Children: 3
- Parent(s): Jojaiah Naidu, Thamasamma

Vallabhaneni Balashowry (born 18 September 1968) is an Indian politician who is currently serving as a Member of Parliament representing the Machilipatnam Lok Sabha constituency. He is a member of the Janasena Party. Previously, he represented the Tenali Lok Sabha constituency as a Member of Parliament in the 14th Lok Sabha.

== Early and personal life ==
Balashowry was born on 18 September 1968 in Morjampadu, a village in Palnadu district of Andhra Pradesh. He was born into a Telugu Kapu family. He completed a Bachelor of Commerce degree from Andhra University.

== Political career ==
Balashowry contested and won the 2004 Lok Sabha elections as a Congress candidate from Tenali constituency with 54.47% of votes polled and a 78,556 majority over the incumbent Telugu Desam Party's Ummareddy Venkateswarlu. He served as the MP until the constituency was abolished in 2008 and merged into Guntur constituency.

He later contested and won the 2019 Lok Sabha elections as a YSR Congress Party candidate from Machilipatnam constituency with 46.02% of votes polled and a 60,141 majority over the incumbent Telugu Desam Party's Konakalla Narayana Rao.

On 14 January 2024, he left YSRCP to join Jana Sena Party. He joined Jana Sena Party on February 4 in the presence of party president Pawan Kalyan In Amaravathi. He won the machilphatham seat from Janasena and became the lok sabha leader for Janasena party.

== Filmography ==
Vallabhaneni produced the 2004 film Letha Manasulu, which was directed by S. V. Krishna Reddy.

== Electoral record ==
Year	Election	Party	Constituency Name	Result
2004	14th Lok Sabha	Indian National Congress	Tenali	Won
2009	15th Lok Sabha	Indian National Congress	Narasaraopet	Lost
2014	16th Lok Sabha	YSR Congress Party	Guntur	Lost
2019	17th Lok Sabha	YSR Congress Party	Machilipatnam	Won
2024	18th Lok Sabha	Janasena Party	Machilipatnam	Won
