= Nangegadda =

- Village
- Interactive map of Nangegadda
- Location in Andhra Pradesh, India Nangegadda (India)
- Coordinates: 16°1′11″N 80°55′12″E
- Country: India
- State: Andhra Pradesh
- District: Krishna

Area
  - Total: 8.58 km^{2} (3.31 sq mi)

Population (2011)
  - Total: 3,580
  - Density: 417/km^{2} (1,080/sq mi)

Languages
  - Official: Telugu
- Time zone: UTC+5:30 (IST)
- Vehicle registration: AP

Nangegadda is a village in Krishna district of Indian state of Andhra Pradesh. It is located in Nagayalanka mandal of Machilipatnam revenue division.
