= Raavi Venkateswara Rao =

Indian politician

Raavi Venkateswara Rao (born 1959) is an Indian politician from Andhra Pradesh. He is a former Member of the Legislative Assembly.

Rao is from Gudivada, Krishna district. He was the son of former two time MLA, Raavi Sobhanadri Chowdary. He completed his MBA.

== Career ==
Rao won the bye election to Gudivada Assembly constituency held in 2000 representing Telugu Desam Party. He polled 62,559 and defeated his nearest rival, Sistla Ramesh of the Indian National Congress, by a margin of 31,997 votes. In 2009, he contested on the Praja Rajyam Party but finished only third behind winner Kodali Sri Venkateswara Rao (Nani) of the Telugu Desam Party and Pinnamaneni Venkateswara Rao of Congress, who came second. In September 2012, he rejoined the Telugu Desam Party in Hyderabad and was named as the incharge for Gudivada constituency. He contested from the Gudivada seat again in the 2014 Andhra Pradesh Legislative Assembly election but lost to Kodali Sri Venkateswara Rao (Nani).
