= Gannavaram, Krishna Assembly constituency =

Constituency of the Andhra Pradesh Legislative Assembly, India

Coordinates: 16.54°N 80.80°E

Gannavaram
- Constituency No. 71 for the Andhra Pradesh Legislative Assembly
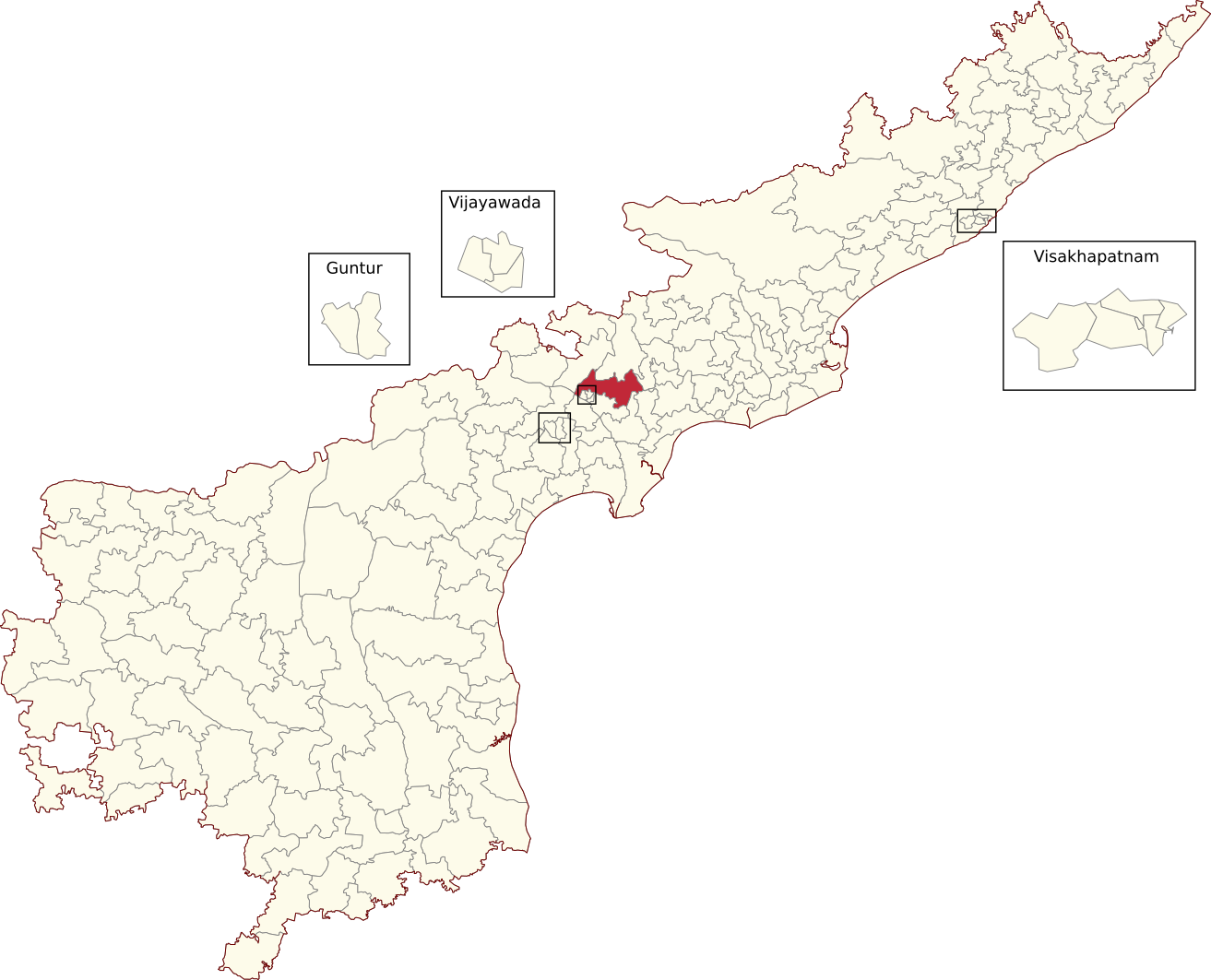
- Location of Gannavaram Assembly constituency within Andhra Pradesh

Constituency details
- Country: India
- Region: South India
- State: Andhra Pradesh
- District: Krishna(Partial) & NTR(Partial)
- Lok Sabha constituency: Machilipatnam
- Established: 1955
- Total electors: 258,031
- Reservation: None

Member of Legislative Assembly
- 16th Andhra Pradesh Legislative Assembly
- Incumbent Yarlagadda Venkata Rao
- Party: TDP
- Alliance: NDA
- Elected year: 2024

Gannavaram Assembly constituency is a constituency in Krishna(Partial) & NTR(Partial) of Andhra Pradesh that elects representatives to the Andhra Pradesh Legislative Assembly in India. It is one of the seven assembly segments of Machilipatnam Lok Sabha constituency.

Yarlagadda Venkata Rao is the current MLA of the constituency, having won the 2024 Andhra Pradesh Legislative Assembly election from Telugu Desam Party. As of 2019, there are a total of 258,031 electors in the constituency. The constituency was established in 1955, as per the Delimitation Orders (1955).

== Mandals ==
The four mandals that form the assembly constituency are:

Mandal
Bapulapadu
Gannavaram
Unguturu
Vijayawada Rural (Part)

== Members of the Legislative Assembly ==
Year	Member	Political party
1955	Puchalapalli Sundarayya	Communist Party of India
1962	Puchalapalli Sundarayya	Communist Party of India
1967	V. Seetha Ramayya	Indian National Congress
1968*	Kakani Venkata Ratnam	Indian National Congress
1972	T. S. Anand Babu	Indian National Congress
1978	Puchalapalli Sundarayya	Communist Party of India
1983	M. Rathna Bose	Telugu Desam Party
1985	M. Balakrishna Rao	Telugu Desam Party
1989	M. Rathna Bose	Indian National Congress
1994	Gadde Rama Mohan	Independent
1999	D. V. BalavardhanaRao	Telugu Desam Party
2004	M. Venkateswara Rao	Independent
2009	D. V. Balavardhana Rao	Telugu Desam Party
2014	Vallabhaneni Vamsi Mohan	Telugu Desam Party
2019	Vallabhaneni Vamsi Mohan	Telugu Desam Party
2024	Yarlagadda Venkata Rao	Telugu Desam Party

*by-election

== Election results ==
=== 2024 ===
2024 Andhra Pradesh Legislative Assembly election: Gannavaram
Party	Candidate	Votes	%	±%
TDP	Yarlagadda Venkata Rao	135,552	56.59	
YSRCP	Vallabhaneni Vamsi Mohan	97,924	40.88	
CPI(M)	Kallam Venkateswara Rao	1,219	0.51	
NOTA	None Of The Above	1,731	0.72	
Majority		37,628	15.95	
Turnout		2,39,525		
TDP hold		Swing		

=== 2019 ===
2019 Andhra Pradesh Legislative Assembly election: Gannavaram
Party	Candidate	Votes	%	±%
TDP	Vallabhaneni Vamsi Mohan	103,881	47.07	
YSRCP	Yarlagadda Venkata Rao	1,03,043	46.69	
CPI	Afsar Syed	6,675	03.02	
Majority		838		
Turnout		220,718		
TDP hold		Swing		

=== 2014 ===
2014 Andhra Pradesh Legislative Assembly election: Gannavaram
Party	Candidate	Votes	%	±%
TDP	Vallabhaneni Vamsi Mohan	99,163	49.74	
YSRCP	Dutta Ramachandrarao	89,615	44.95	
Majority		9,548	4.79	
TDP hold		Swing		

=== 2009 ===
2009 Andhra Pradesh Legislative Assembly election: Gannavaram
Party	Candidate	Votes	%	±%
TDP	Dasari Venkata Bala Vardhana Rao	82,218	47.02	
INC	Muddaraboina Venkateswara Rao	66,923	38.28	
PRP	Bathina Rama Mohana Rao	19,806	11.33	
Majority		15,295	8.74	
Turnout		174,847	86.74	2.63
TDP gain from Independent		Swing		

== See also ==
- List of constituencies of Andhra Pradesh Legislative Assembly
