= Edurumondi =

- Village
- Interactive map of Edurumondi
- Location in Andhra Pradesh, India
- Coordinates: 15.8389°N 80.8883°E
- Country: India
- State: Andhra Pradesh
- District: Krishna

Area
  - Total: 37.56 km^{2} (14.50 sq mi)
- Elevation: 9 m (30 ft)

Population (2011)
  - Total: 5,979
  - Density: 159.2/km^{2} (412.3/sq mi)

Languages
  - Official: Telugu
- Time zone: UTC+5:30 (IST)

Edurumondi is a village in Krishna district of Indian state of Andhra Pradesh. It is located in Nagayalanka mandal of Machilipatnam revenue division. The village is situated along the mouths of the Krishna River, where it empties into Bay of Bengal. అవనిగడ్డ ఎదురుమోంది కి సమీప పట్టణం.

== Demographics ==
As of 2011 Census of India, Edurumondi had a population of 5,979. The total population constitute, 3,126 males and 2,853 females —a sex ratio of 913 females per 1000 males. 638 children are in the age group of 0–6 years, of which 346 are boys and 292 are girls —a ratio of 844 per 1000. The average literacy rate stands at 60.78% with 3,246 literates, significantly lower than the state average of 67.41%.

== See also ==
- Nagayalanka mandal
