= Vakkapatlavari Palem =

- Village
- Interactive map of Vakkapatlavari Palem
- Location in Andhra Pradesh, India
- Country: India
- State: Andhra Pradesh
- District: Krishna

Government
  - Type: Gram Panchayat

Languages
  - Official: Telugu
- Time zone: UTC+5:30 (IST)
- Postal code: 521120

Vakkapatlavari Palem is a village in Nagayalanka mandal of Krishna district, Andhra Pradesh. It has been a gram panchayat since the 1960s.
