= Pashan Test Range =

Pashan Test Range is an out-door testing and evaluating facility of Armament Research and Development Establishment for armament stores.

It is located in outskirt of Pune near Pashan village and is spread over 150 acres of land surrounded by hills on three sides.

The facilities at Pasan Test Range include the following:

- Small arms firing up to 1,000-m range
- Velocity measurement tunnel up to 100 m
- Sand butt tunnel for firing of high-calibre guns
- Leaning tower for aircraft seat ejection studies
- Environment testing for life assessment of armament stores
- High-speed photography and video recording
- Photometric tunnel for measuring luminosity of illuminating store
- 30-m para-drop tower

Since Pashan Test Range is located in the vicinity of a metropolitan city, it a limited trial facility and full range trial cannot be conducted here

== See also ==
- Chitradurga Aeronautical Test Range
- Ramgarh Test Range
- Tandur Test Range
- Machilipatnam Test Range Project
