= Sanaka Buchhikotaiah =

Indian politician

Sanaka Buchhikotaiah సనకా బుచ్చికోటయ్య

MP
- In office 1952–57
- Preceded by: NA
- Succeeded by: Mandali Venkata Krishna Rao
- Constituency: Machilipatnam

Personal details
- Born: 3 August 1919 Chiruvolulamka Divi Taluq, Avanigadda, India
- Died: 1 November 1986 (aged 67)
- Party: Communist Party of India

Sanaka Buchhikotaiah (3 August 1919 – 1 November 1986) was an Indian politician who served as the Member of Parliament in 1st Lok Sabha from Machilipatnam (Lok Sabha Constituency).

He joined the Communist Party of India in 1940. He was underground, and later detained 1948–1951. He was released in July 1951.
