= Pamarru Assembly constituency =

Constituency of the Andhra Pradesh Legislative Assembly, India

Coordinates: 16.32°N 80.96°E

Pamarru
- Constituency No. 77 for the Andhra Pradesh Legislative Assembly
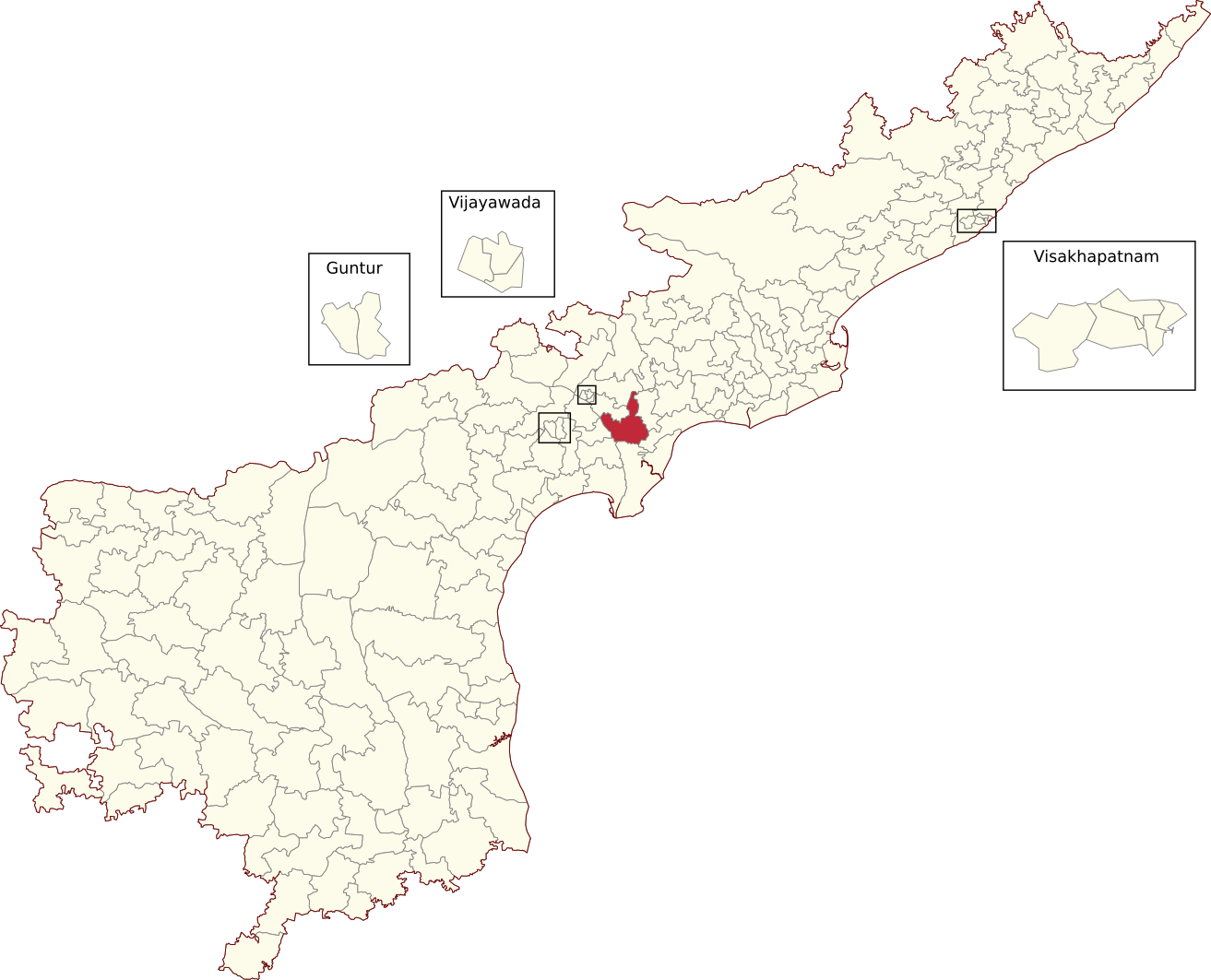
- Location of Pamarru Assembly constituency within Andhra Pradesh

Constituency details
- Country: India
- Region: South India
- State: Andhra Pradesh
- District: Krishna
- Lok Sabha constituency: Machilipatnam
- Established: 1951
- Total electors: 180,834
- Reservation: SC

Member of Legislative Assembly
- 16th Andhra Pradesh Legislative Assembly
- Incumbent Varla Kumar Raja
- Party: TDP
- Alliance: NDA
- Elected year: 2024

Pamarru is a Scheduled Caste reserved constituency in Krishna district of Andhra Pradesh that elects representatives to the Andhra Pradesh Legislative Assembly in India. It is one of the seven assembly segments of Machilipatnam Lok Sabha constituency.

Varla Kumar Raja is the current MLA of the constituency, having won the 2024 Andhra Pradesh Legislative Assembly election from Telugu Desam Party. As of 2019, there are a total of 180,834 electors in the constituency. The constituency was established in 1951, as per the Delimitation Orders (1951).

== Mandals ==
The five mandals that form the assembly constituency are:

Mandal
Pamarru
Thotlavalluru
Pamidimukkala
Movva
Pedaparupudi

== Members of the Legislative Assembly ==
Year	Member	Political party
2009	Dovari Yesu Das	Indian National Congress
2014	Uppuleti Kalpana	YSR Congress Party
2019	Kaile Anil Kumar	YSR Congress Party
2024	Varla Kumar Raja	Telugu Desam Party

== Election results ==
=== 2024 ===
2024 Andhra Pradesh Legislative Assembly election: Pamarru
Party	Candidate	Votes	%	±%
TDP	Varla Kumar Raja	94,189	57.13	
YSRCP	Kaile Anil Kumar	64,499	39.12	
INC	D. Y. Das	2195	1.35	
NOTA	None Of The Above	1733	1.05	
Majority		29,690	18	
Turnout		1,64,869		
TDP gain from YSRCP		Swing		

=== 2019 ===
2019 Andhra Pradesh Legislative Assembly election: Pamarru (SC)
Party	Candidate	Votes	%	±%
YSRCP	Kaile Anil Kumar	88,547	56.15	
TDP	Uppuleti Kalpana	57,674	36.57	
BSP	Jhansi Rani Medepalli	5,574	3.53	
NOTA	None of the Above	1,934	1.23	
INC	Movva Mohana Rao	1,788	1.13	
BJP	Valaparla Venkateswara Rao	610	0.39	
Majority		30,873	19.58	
Turnout		157,691	87.16	
YSRCP hold		Swing		

=== 2014 ===
2014 Andhra Pradesh Legislative Assembly election: Pamarru
Party	Candidate	Votes	%	±%
YSRCP	Uppuletti Kalpana	69,546	45.83	
TDP	Varla Ramaiah	68,477	45.12	
Majority		1,069	0.71	
Turnout		151,759	88.28	+2.83
YSRCP gain from INC		Swing		

=== 2009 ===
2009 Andhra Pradesh Legislative Assembly election: Pamarru
Party	Candidate	Votes	%	±%
INC	Dovari Yesu Das	60,048	41.76	
TDP	Uppuleti Kalpana	53,108	36.93	
PRP	Movva Mohana Rao	23,438	16.30	
Majority		6,940	4.83	
Turnout		143,809	85.45	
INC win (new seat)				

=== 1952 ===
1952 Madras Legislative Assembly election: Pamarru
Party	Candidate	Votes	%	±%
INC	S. B. P. Pattabhi Rama Rao	23,405	48.98%	
CPI	P. Panasaramanna	21,879	45.79%	
Independent	R. Veerabhadra Rao	2,497	5.23%	
Margin of victory		1,526	3.19%	
Turnout		47,781	72.70%	
Registered electors		65,726		
INC win (new seat)				

== See also ==
- List of constituencies of the Andhra Pradesh Legislative Assembly
