= Kaile Anil Kumar =

Indian politician (born 1979)

Member of Legislative Assembly, Andhra Pradesh
- In office 2019–2024
- Preceded by: Uppuleti Kalpana
- Succeeded by: Varla Kumar Raja
- Constituency: Pamarru

Personal details
- Party: YSR Congress Party

Kaile Anil Kumar (born 1979) is an Indian politician from Andhra Pradesh. He is an MLA of YSR Congress Party from Pamarru Assembly constituency in Krishna district which is reserved for SC community. He won the 2019 Andhra Pradesh Legislative Assembly election. He is nominated by YSR Congress Party again to contest from Pamarru constituency.

== Early life and education ==
Kumar hails from Pamarru. He was born to Kaile Sanjeeva Rao. He completed his BBM from Noble College, Machilipatnam.

== Career ==
Kumar won the 2019 Andhra Pradesh Legislative Assembly election from Pamarr Assembly constituency on YSR Congress Party ticket defeating Telugu Desam candidate Uppuleti Kalpana by a margin of 30,873 votes. In January 2023, his house was reportedly ransacked. In March 2024, chief minister Jagan Mohan Reddy praised him for his developmental activities.
