= Etimoga =

- Village
- Interactive map of Etimoga
- Location in Andhra Pradesh, India
- Coordinates: 15.8612°N 80.8993°E
- Country: India
- State: Andhra Pradesh
- District: Krishna

Area
  - Total: 15.79 km^{2} (6.10 sq mi)
- Elevation: 7 m (23 ft)

Population (2011)
  - Total: 4,076
  - Density: 258.1/km^{2} (668.6/sq mi)

Languages
  - Official: Telugu
- Time zone: UTC+5:30 (IST)

Etimoga is a village in Krishna district of Indian state of Andhra Pradesh. It is located in Nagayalanka mandal of Machilipatnam revenue division. The village is situated at the mouths of River Krishna, where it empties into Bay of Bengal.

== Demographics ==
As of 2011 Census of India, Etimoga had a population of 4,076. The total population constitute, 2,111 males and 1,965 females —a sex ratio of 931 females per 1000 males. 373 children are in the age group of 0–6 years, of which 215 are boys and 158 are girls —a ratio of 735 per 1000. The average literacy rate stands at 60.19% with 2,229 literates, significantly lower than the state average of 67.41%.

== See also ==
- Nagayalanka mandal
- Krishna District
