= Bhavadevarapalle =

- Village
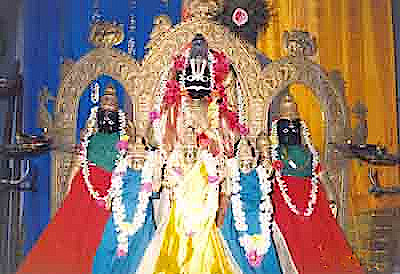
- Presiding deities of famous temple at Bhavadevarapalli
- Interactive map of Bhavadevarapalle
- Coordinates: 16.114°N 81.021°E
- Country: India
- State: Andhra Pradesh
- District: Krishna
- Founder: Bhogadi's

Area
  - Total: 24.28 km^{2} (9.37 sq mi)

Population (2011)
  - Total: 3,061
  - Density: 126.1/km^{2} (326.5/sq mi)

Languages
  - Official: Telugu
- Time zone: UTC+5:30 (IST)
- PIN: 521120
- Telephone code: 91-8671
- Vehicle registration: AP

Bhavadevarapalle, also Bhavadevarapalli, is a village in Krishna district of Indian state of Andhra Pradesh. It is located in Nagayalanka mandal of Machilipatnam revenue division. It is known for the famous Bhavannarayana Temple. Because of this temple the village got its name. It is located 5 kilometres (3.1 mi) southwest of another famous temple at Lingareddypalem.
