= Konakalla Narayana Rao =

Indian politician (born 1950)

Member of Parliament, Lok Sabha
- In office 16 May 2009 – 23 May 2019
- Preceded by: Ramakrishna Badiga
- Succeeded by: Vallabhaneni Balashowry
- Constituency: Machilipatnam, Andhra Pradesh

Personal details
- Born: 4 May 1950 (age 75) Machilipatnam, Madras State, India (now in Andhra Pradesh, India)
- Party: Telugu Desam Party
- Spouse: Smt. Padmaja
- Relations: Konakalla Bullaiah (Brother)
- Children: Kiran Ganapathi; Chaitanya Ganpathi
- Parents: Shri Ganapathi; Smt. Kasieswaramma
- Website: KonakallaNarayanaRao.in

Konakalla Narayana Rao (born 4 May 1950) was an Indian politician who served as a member of the Lok Sabha, representing Machilipatnam in Andhra Pradesh. He was elected in 2009 and again in 2014 as a candidate for the Telugu Desam Party. Rao belongs to the Goud community. In addition to his political career, he has been involved in social and cultural activities, including organizing theatre competitions in Machilipatnam.

== Political career ==
Konakalla Narayana Rao was a member of the Telugu Desam Party. He was elected to the Lok Sabha from the Machilipatnam constituency in Krishna District, Andhra Pradesh, in 2009 (15th Lok Sabha) and 2014 (16th Lok Sabha).

During the 15th Lok Sabha (2009), Konakalla Narayana Rao was appointed as a member of the Committee of Petroleum and Natural Gas. As a part of the Panel of Chairpersons, he served as a panel speaker in the Lok Sabha.

Key Positions held by Rao:

- May 3, 2013, Member, Committee on the Welfare of Other Backward Classes (OBCs)
- May 2014 Re-elected to the 16th Lok Sabha (2nd term)
- June 12, 2014 Member, House Committee
- Sep 1, 2014 Member, Standing Committee on Agriculture
- October 2024, Chairman (non-official), Andhra Pradesh State Road Transport Corporation

== Election results ==
General Election, 2009: Machilipatnam
Party	Candidate	Votes	%	±%
TDP	Konakalla Narayana Rao	409,936	39.19	−5.40
INC	Badiga Ramakrishna	397,480	38.00	−13.25
PRP	Chennamsetti Ramachandraiah	186,921	17.87	
Majority		12,456	1.19	
Turnout		1,045,905	83.60	+7.54
TDP gain from INC		Swing		

General Election, 2014: Machilipatnam
Party	Candidate	Votes	%	±%
TDP	Konakalla Narayana Rao	587,280	51.47	+12.28
YSRCP	Kolusu Partha Sarathy	506,223	44.36	
INC	Sistla Ramesh	14,111	1.24	
Jai Samaikyandhra Party	Kammili Srinivas	7,692	0.67	
Pyramid Party of India	Vadapalli Raghunadh	4,401	0.39	
BSP	Peggem Prasada Rao	4,085	0.36	
Independent	Parasa Srinivasa Rao	3,399	0.30	
Independent	Mohammad Ishaq	1,770	0.16	
Independent	Yunduri Subramanyaswara Rao (Mani)	1,597	0.14	
Independent	Yarlagadda Rama Mohan Rao	1,405	0.12	
Independent	Jampana Srinivasa Goud	931	0.08	
NOTA	None of the Above	8,171	0.72	
Majority		81,057	7.11	
Turnout		1,141,065	83.33	−0.27
TDP hold		Swing		

== Development activities ==
While contesting the Lok Sabha elections, Rao’s campaign included the re-establishment of the Machilipatnam Port, the doubling and electrification of the Machilipatnam–Gudivada–Vijayawada railway line, the creation of a new Machilipatnam–Repalle railway line, the modernization of Machilipatnam Railway Station, the expansion of NH-214A into a six-lane highway from Machilipatnam to Vijayawada, and the conversion of the national highway into a four-lane road from Machilipatnam to Ongole. These projects are currently at various stages of implementation.
