= Chitradurga Aeronautical Test Range =

Aeronautical Test Range (ATR), Chitradurga is an out-door testing and evaluation facility set up by the Defence Research and Development Organisation (DRDO) exclusively for unmanned and manned aircraft. The ATR is under the command of the Aeronautical Development Establishment (ADE).

ATR, Chitradurga is located at Varavoo Kaval in Challakere Taluk of Chitradurga district on a 4,290 acre plot. The land was bought by the Ministry of Defence from the Karnataka state government for Rs.12 crore (Rs.120 million) in a deal negotiated in 2008. The project was set up with an investment of Rs 1300 Crores.

ATR, Chitradurga has a Range Control Centre (RCC) with air traffic display system. It is equipped with a mission video distribution and display system. It has a Radar Centre which houses primary and secondary surveillance radars. It has two hangars which houses unmanned aerial vehicles Rustom-1 and Rustom-2. The runway is currently 2.2 km long with the capacity to host take off and landing from any end.

The project envisages a runway beside other tracking and control equipments and a rail link to the facility have also been planned. In 2021, ADE planned to expand the runway from 2.2 km to 3 km and set up a high-power computing facility.

Chitradurga ATR is intended to conduct the trials of unmanned aerial vehicles (UAVs), air-to-ground weapons, parachutes and aerostats. It has been planned not to utilize Challakere ATR for test flight of ballistic missiles.

The Chitradurga ATR was partially activated on 15 December 2010. The facility was formally inaugurated by the Union Defence and Finance Minister Arun Jaitley on 28 May 2017.

Indian Space Research Organisation conducted 3 RLV-TD LEX missions between April, 2023 and June, 2024 at ATR using Chinook helicopters provided by IAF. Reusable Launch Vehicle - Autonomous Landing Missions or RLV LEX missions are a crucial step towards realisation of an Indian reusable launch vehicle.

== See also ==
- Pashan Test Range
- Ramgarh Test Range
- Tandur Test Range
