= Uppuleti Kalpana =

Indian politician

Uppuleti Kalpana (born 1961) is an Indian politician from Andhra Pradesh. She is a former Member of the Andhra Pradesh Legislative Assembly.

== Early life and education ==
Kalpana is from Pamarru, Krishna district. She married U. Devi Prasad, who served as Commissioner of Income Tax in Hyderabad. She completed her B.E in electronics & communications at Andhra University Engineering College, Visakhapatnam in 1984. She worked as a teacher before entering politics.

== Career ==
Kalpana won the 2014 Andhra Pradesh Legislative Assembly election representing YSR Congress Party from Pamarru Assembly constituency which is reserved for Scheduled Caste community in Krishna district. She polled 69,546 votes and defeated her nearest rival, Varla Ramaiah of the Telugu Desam Party, by a margin of 1069 votes. She first contested Assembly polls on Telugu Desam ticket but lost the elections in 2004 and 2009. In 2009, she polled 53,108 votes against 60,048 garnered by D. Y. Das of the Congress party and lost by a margin of 6,940 votes. In December 2016, she rejoined Telugu Desam Party.
