= Ghantasala, Krishna district =

Ghantasala ghantasala
- Village
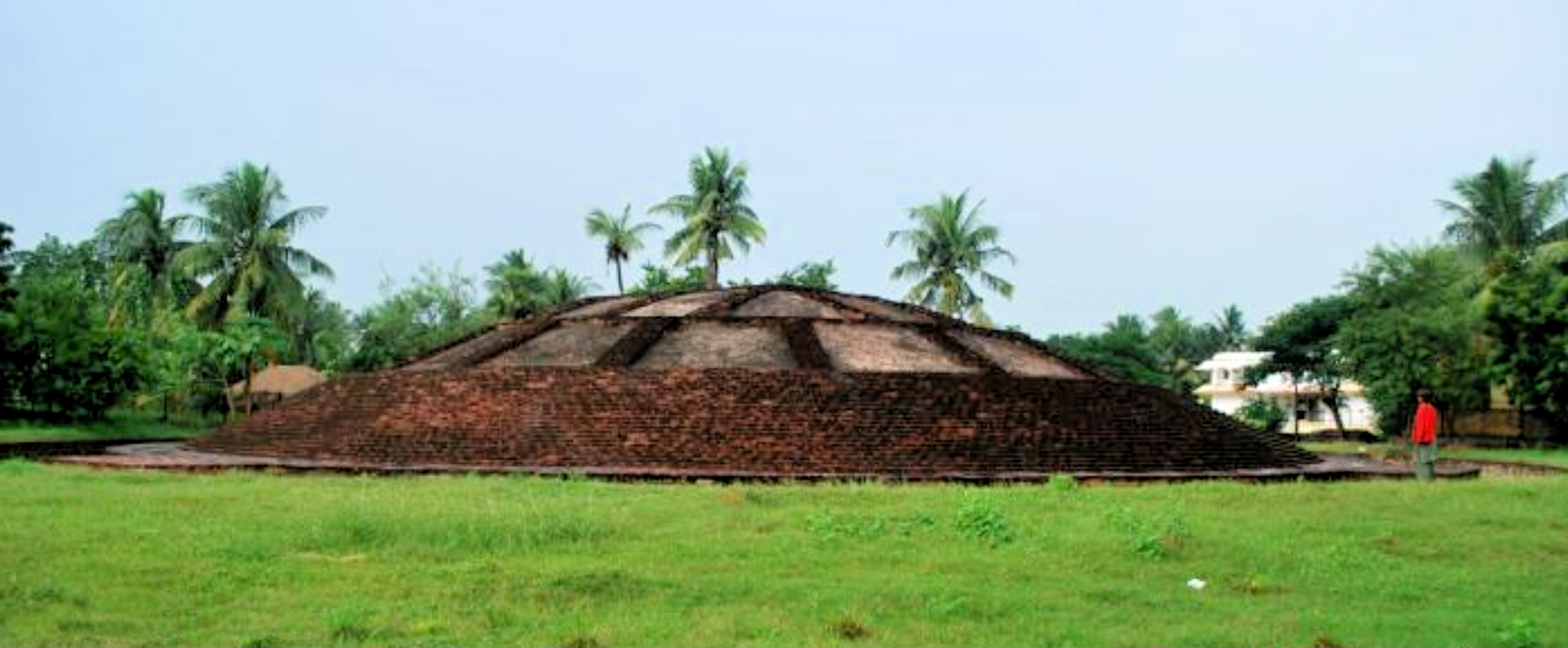
- The Ghantasala stupa
- Interactive map of Ghantasala
- Location in Andhra Pradesh, India Ghantasala (India)
- Coordinates: 16°10′9.62184″N 80°56′39.3835199880193″E
- Country: India
- State: Andhra Pradesh
- District: Krishna

Area
  - Total: 12.21 km^{2} (4.71 sq mi)

Population (2011)
  - Total: 9,248
  - Density: 757.4/km^{2} (1,962/sq mi)

Languages
  - Official: Telugu
- Time zone: UTC+5:30 (IST)
- PIN: 521133
- Telephone code: 08671
- Vehicle registration: AP 16
- Nearest city: Machilipatnam, Gudivada
- Sex ratio: 10:9.8 ♂/♀
- Literacy: 60%
- Lok Sabha constituency: Machilipatnam
- Vidhan Sabha constituency: Avanigadda

Ghantasala is a village in Krishna district of the Indian state of Andhra Pradesh. It is 21 km west of Machilipatnam and 11 km east of Krishna River. The largest city of this district, Vijayawada, is around 60 km away. It is a rare and reputed center for Buddhist sculptures. Kaṇṭakasola was the ancient name of Ghantasala. It was also mentioned by Ptolemy (2nd century CE) as Kantakossyla.

== History ==
Ghantasala is a village and the headquarters of Ghantasala mandal in Krishna District of Andhra Pradesh. It is 21 km west of Machilipatnam and 11 km east of River Krishna. Kaṇṭakasola was the ancient name of Ghantasala. It was also mentioned by Ptolemy as Kantakossyla.

Boswell of the East India Company first reported Ghantasala as a historical site in 1870-71. Alexander Rea excavated the stupa at Ghantasala, which had a circumference of 112 feet and a height of 23 feet. The remains of an important Buddhist stupa and sculptural slabs were found in 1919-20. Ghantasala was once a flourishing town of Indo-Roman trade as well as an important religious centre. The Buddhist relics and the Hindu structures at the place reveal its past glory. Carved limestone columns belonging to pillared halls associated with Buddhist monastic establishments (2-3rd centuries BC ) have been discovered. The ruined Maha Chaitya or stupa that was excavated here is of a unique design. A cube of solid bricks is set in the centre, inscribed with 12 constellations of the zodiac.

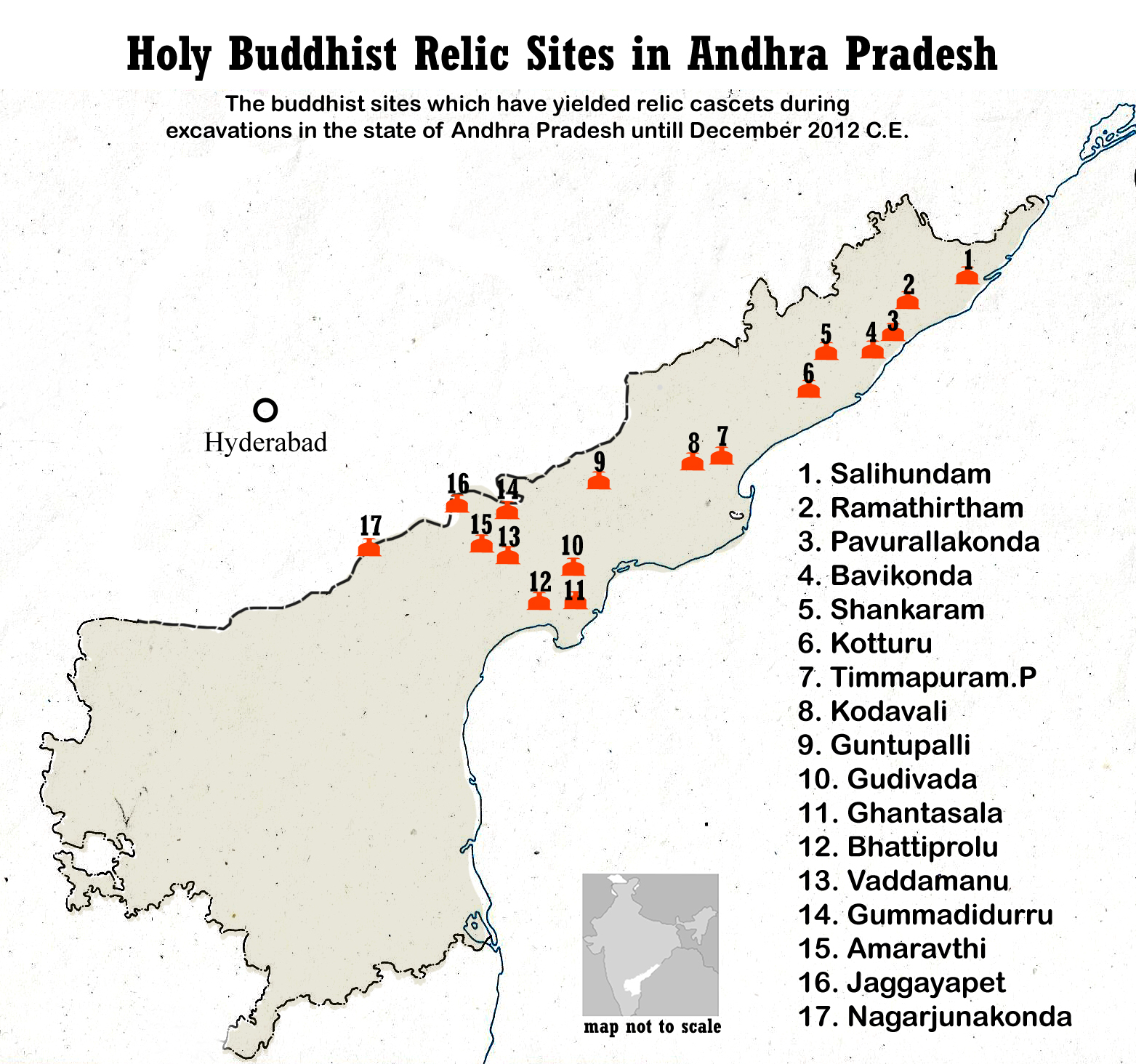
Ghantasala is one of the Holy relic Buddhist sites of Andhra Pradesh.

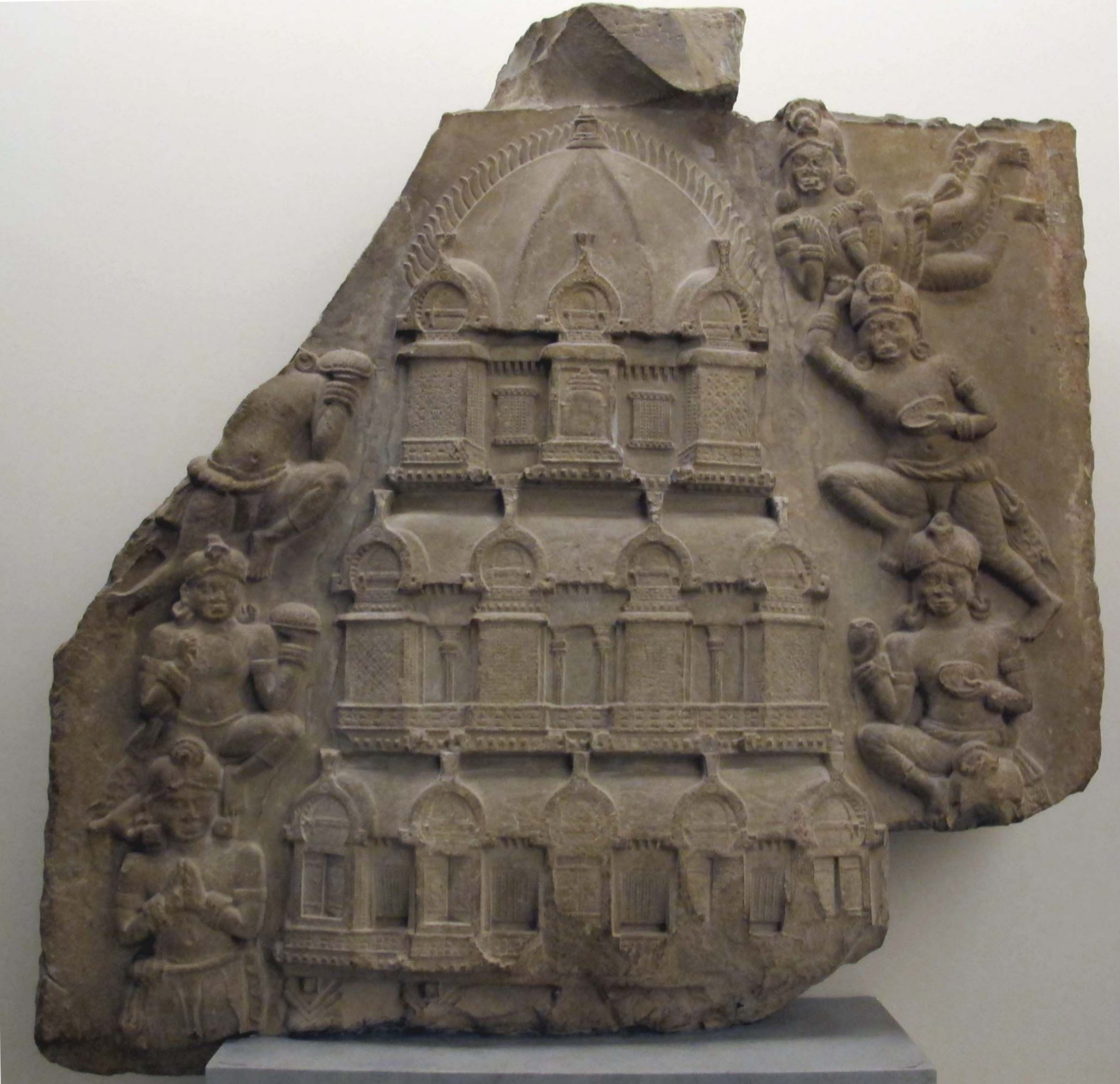
Relief of a multi-storied temple, 2nd century CE, Ghantasala Stupa.

The chaityas had a texture and size unique to the Satavahana times and had separate dwelling places for Buddhist monks in the complex. All walls were found to have beautiful plastering with superfine lime mortar. A three-dimensional limestone carved structure, embellished on the dome portion of the stupa had two garland bearers, a dhamma chakra and a miniature stupa on a throne in the middle. Objects such as a four-by-three-feet 'Purna Kalasa' containing lotus flowers, indicating the birth of Gautama Buddha were also discovered. The stupa had concentric inner wheels radiating towards a central chamber.primary amongst them is a raised cylindrical mound with a semi spheric

== Economy ==
Hand-loom industry

Hand loom weaving is most predominant in the village. Mangalagiri and Gadwal cotton sarees are the mostly weaved and are exported many parts of the country.

== Transport ==
Machilipatnam is connected by road and rail from Vijaywada. Vijaywada has an airport located some 20 km away at Gannavaram.

== See also ==
- Andhra Vishnu
- Villages in Ghantasala mandal
