= Morjampadu =

- Village
- Interactive map of Morjampadu
- Location in Andhra Pradesh, India Morjampadu (India)
- Coordinates: 16.592°N 79.908°E
- Country: India
- State: Andhra Pradesh
- District: Palnadu
- Founder: Narendra satuluri

Population
  - Total: 20,000

Languages
  - Official: Telugu
- Time zone: UTC+5:30 (IST)
- PIN: 522413
- Telephone code: 91 8649
- Vehicle registration: AP07

Morjampadu is a village in Palnadu district of Andhra Pradesh in India with a population of around 15,000. One of the Major and great Panchayat in Machavaram Mandal.
