= Yarlagadda Venkata Rao =

Indian politician

Government Whip, Andhra Pradesh Legislative Assembly
- Incumbent
- Assumed office 12 November 2024

Member of the Andhra Pradesh Legislative Assembly
- Incumbent
- Assumed office 4 June 2024
- Chief Minister: N. Chandrababu Naidu
- Preceded by: Vallabhaneni Vamsi Mohan
- Constituency: Gannavaram, Krishna district

Personal details
- Born: 1975 (age 50–51) Kanuru, Vijayawada, Krishna district, Andhra Pradesh, India
- Party: TDP (2023 – present)
- Other political affiliations: YSRCP (2018 – 2023)
- Parent: Rama Sheshagiri Rao (father)
- Occupation: Politician

Yarlagadda Venkata Rao (born 1975) is an Indian politician and current Member of the Legislative Assembly (MLA) for Gannavaram, Krishna Assembly constituency in the state of Andhra Pradesh. Before joining the Telugu Desam Party he was a member of YSR Congress Party which he left due to the inclusion of Vallabhaneni Vamsi Mohan. In November 2024, the Government of Andhra Pradesh appointed Venkata Rao as a Government Whip in the Andhra Pradesh Legislative Assembly.

== Early life and education ==
Yarlagadda Venkata Rao was born in 1975 to Rama Seshagiri Rao Yarlagadda in Kanuru, located in the Krishna district of Andhra Pradesh, India. He completed his secondary schooling in 1989 at VRMS School in Vuyyuru. He went on to finish his intermediate education in 1991 and graduated with a Bachelor of Science (B.Sc.) degree from Acharya Nagarjuna University in 1998, studying at the AG & SG Siddhartha College in Vuyyuru. Outside of his political career, Venkata Rao is a businessman with investments and commercial interests both in India and internationally.

== Electoral performance ==
S.No	Year	Election	Constituency	Party	Votes	Margin	Result
1	2019	MLA	Gannavaram (Krishna)	YSRCP	103,043	-838	Lost
2	2024	MLA	Gannavaram (Krishna)	TDP	135,552	+37,628	Won
