= Simhadri Satyanarayana Rao =

Indian politician

Member of Legislative Assembly Andhra Pradesh
- In office 1985–1999
- Preceded by: Mandali Venkata Krishna Rao
- Succeeded by: Mandali Buddha Prasad
- Constituency: Avanigadda

Personal details
- Born: 19 October 1929 Bandhalayicheruvu; Avanigadda, Krishna District
- Died: 24 September 2010 (aged 80)
- Party: Telugu Desam Party (1985–1999)
- Children: Simhadri Chandrasekhar

Simhadri Satyanarayana Rao was a politician who held the portfolios of Endowments and Commercial Taxes in the governments of N. T. Rama Rao and N. Chandrababu Naidu.

== Political life ==
He joined the Telugu Desam Party under the leadership of NTR after giving up his 30 years of lucrative law practice. In the 1985 mid-term elections to the Assembly, Satyanarayana Rao trounced Mandali Venkata Krishna Rao, who had a long and unconquered stint as MLA from Avanigadda constituency. He was known for his commitment to the development of temples during his two terms and was referred to as ‘devudi mantri' (minister of gods).

== Honours ==
Lok Satta Party honored Simhadri on 9 December 2007, on World Anti Corruption Day, since he stood against corruption and for clean politics.

== Personal life ==
His son, S Chandrasekhar, is an oncologist in Hyderabad.

== Death ==
Satyanarayana Rao underwent treatment for kidney failure in Nagarjuna Hospital at Kanuru near Vijayawada and died after battling for life for three months. He died on 24 September 2010.

== See also ==
- Avanigadda
- Mandali Venkata Krishna Rao
