= Vallabhaneni Vamsi Mohan =

Indian politician

Member of Legislative Assembly, Andhra Pradesh
- In office 2014–2024
- Preceded by: D. V. Balavardhana Rao
- Succeeded by: Yarlagadda Venkata Rao
- Constituency: Gannavaram

Personal details
- Party: YSR Congress Party
- Other political affiliations: Telugu Desam Party
- Parent: Ramesh Chandra (father)

Vallabhaneni Vamsi Mohan is an Indian politician from Andhra Pradesh. He is a former Member of Legislative Assembly (MLA ). He was elected three times as MLA of Andhra Pradesh from Gannavaram Constituency.

== Early life and education ==
Vamsi hails from Gannavaram. His father's name was Vallabhaneni Ramesh Chandra (late). He married Pankaja Sree. He completed his graduation and post-graduation from Agricultural University, Tirupati and obtained his M.V.Sc. in 1992. In 2024, he completed his graduation from the Indian School of Business, Hyderabad.

== Career ==
Vamsi was elected as an MLA from Gannavaram Constituency for the first time in 2014 on TDP ticket. He won the 2014 Andhra Pradesh Legislative Assembly Election defeating Dutta Ramachandra Rao of YSRCP by a margin of 9,548 votes. He was re-elected from the same constituency representing TDP again in the 2019 Andhra Pradesh Legislative Assembly Election defeating Yarlagadda Venkatarao by 838 votes. He later joined YSRCP.

=== Films ===
Vamsi is also a film producer in Tollywood(Telugu Cinema). He produced two high budget films, Adhurs (2010) and Touch Chesi Chudu (2018), with Jr. NTR and Ravi Teja, respectively.

== Arrests ==
On 2 August 2024, he was arrested by the AP Police over alleged involvement in TDP office, Gannavaram attack incident and was later released on bail.

On 13 February 2025, he was arrested by the AP Police on alleged involvement in threatening a person.

== As producer ==
| Year | Title | Language | Notes |
|---|---|---|---|
| 2010 | Adurs | Telugu | |
| 2018 | Touch Chesi Chudu | Telugu | |
