= Lingareddypalem =

Village in Andhra Pradesh, India

Coordinates: 15.99°N 81.00°E

Lingareddypalem, also Lingareddy Palem, is a village in Krishna District of Andhra Pradesh, India. It is located in the Koduru Mandal at a distance of 110 km from Vijayawada and 50 km from Machilipatnam. The Postal Index (PIN) is 521328.

== Lord Shiva Temple ==
Famous for Lord Shiva incarnation as Sri Gokarneshwara Swami with Mother Parvathi as Sri Bala Tripura Sundari Devi.

== Education ==
There are two schools in Lingareddypalem. One is Zilla parishad high school and the second one is Elementary school.
