= Venigandla Ramu =

Indian politician and entrepreneur

Member of Legislative Assembly Andhra Pradesh
- Incumbent
- Assumed office 4 June 2024
- Preceded by: Kodali Nani
- Constituency: Gudivada

Personal details
- Born: 1970 (age 55–56)
- Party: Telugu Desam Party

Venigandla Ramu is an Indian politician and a Member of Legislative Assembly (MLA) representing Gudivada assembly constituency in the Andhra Pradesh Legislative Assembly. He is also an entrepreneur. He belongs to the Telugu Desam Party.

== Personal life ==
He is the CEO of Eficens systems. He worked in IT industry in the United States and returned to India.

== Political career ==
- He became active in politics in 2023. He joined Telugu Desam Party.
- In 2024 Andhra Pradesh assembly elections, he contested as an MLA candidate from TDP for the Gudivada assembly constituency and has emerged victorious.

=== As a Member of Legislative Assembly ===
- In June 2024, Ramu won as the MLA from Gudivada assembly constituency with 53,040 votes majority.
