= Ambati Brahmanaiah =

Indian politician

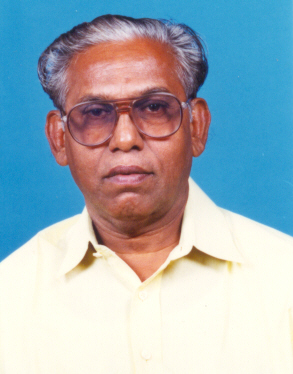

Personal details
- Born: 13 January 1939; Vakkapatlavari Palem, Nagayalanka, Krishna District, Andhra Pradesh, India
- Died: 21 April 2013 (aged 74)
- Political party: Telugu Desam Party
- Spouse: Ambati Vasanthakumari
- Children: Ambati Sri Hari Prasad; Sulochana; Vara Lakshmi; Bhagya Lakshmi

Ambati Brahmanaiah (died 21 April 2013) was an Indian politician who was the MP for Machilipatnam 1999–2004, the MLA for Machilipatnam 1994–1999 (The other Contestants at that period are Perni Venkatramayya from Indian National Congress Party and Thota Chalapathi Rao), and Avanigadda (since 2009). He was also the leader of the TDP.
