= Ramgarh Test Range =

Ramgarh Test Range is an out-door testing and evaluating facility of Terminal Ballistics Research Laboratory (TBRL).

It is spread over an area of 5500 acre of land and is located at village Ramgarh, District Panchkula, Haryana, 22 km away from Chandigarh. Ramgarh Test Range is divided into a number of technical zones/trial areas. Each zone takes up specific types of firing trials. Zones have been so designed and spaced as to allow the conduct of experimental trials independent of each other. The facilities established at this range provide high-speed photography, flash radiography, blast and pressure parameters, lethality and fragmentation studies, impact phenomenon studies, etc.

The salient facilities at the Ramgarh test range include:

- Rail Track Rocket Sled (3800 mtrs) .
- Baffle Range for Small Arms.
- Underwater Shock Pressure Tank.

== See also ==
- Pashan Test Range
- Chitradurga Aeronautical Test Range
