= Nagayalanka mandal =

Nagayalanka Mandal
- Mandal
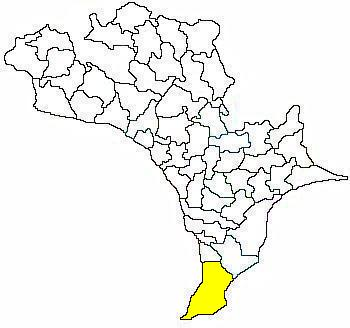
- Mandal map of Krishna district showing Nagayalanka mandal (in yellow)
- Interactive Map Outlining mandal
- Location in Andhra Pradesh, India
- Coordinates: 15.9500°N 80.9167°E
- Country: India
- State: Andhra Pradesh
- District: Krishna
- Headquarters: Nagayalanka

Population (2011)
  - Total: 47,899

Languages
  - Official: Telugu
- Time zone: UTC+5:30 (IST)
- PIN: 521120
- Vehicle registration: AP 16

Nagayalanka mandal is one of the 25 mandals in Krishna district of the Indian state of Andhra Pradesh. It is under the administration of Machilipatnam revenue division and has its headquarters at Nagayalanka. The mandal is bounded by Avanigadda and Koduru mandals. It lies at the mouths of Krishna River where it empties into Bay of Bengal.

== Demographics ==
As of 2011 census, the mandal had a population of 47,899. The total population constitute, 25,076 males and 22,823 females —a sex ratio of 910 females per 1000 males. 4,420 children are in the age group of 0–6 years, of which 2,483 are boys and 1,937 are girls. The average literacy rate stands at 68.99% with 29,995 literates. pin code of Nagayalanka in 521120

== Towns and villages ==
As of 2011 census, the mandal has 11 villages and no towns. Nagayalanka is the most populated village and Chodavaram is the least populated villages in the mandal.

The settlements in the mandal are listed below:

1. Bhavadevarapalle
2. Chodavaram
3. Edurumondi
4. Etimoga
5. Ganapeswaram
6. Kammanamolu
7. Nagayalanka
8. Nangegadda
9. Parrachivara
10. T.Kothapalem
11. Talagadadeevi

== See also ==
- Mandals in Nagayalanka mandal
