= Varla Kumar Raja =

Indian politician

Member of Legislative Assembly Andhra Pradesh
- Incumbent
- Assumed office 4 June 2024
- Preceded by: Kaile Anil Kumar
- Constituency: Pamarru

Personal details
- Citizenship: India
- Party: Telugu Desam Party

Kumar Raja Varla is an Indian politician from Andhra Pradesh. He is a member of Telugu Desam Party.

== Political career ==
Varla was elected as the member of the Legislative Assembly representing the Pamarru Assembly constituency in 2024 Andhra Pradesh Legislative Assembly elections.

== Electoral performance ==
2024 Andhra Pradesh Legislative Assembly election: Pamarru
| Party | Candidate | Votes | % | ±% |
|---|---|---|---|---|
| TDP | Varla Kumar Raja | 94,189 | 57.13 | |
| YSRCP | Kaile Anil Kumar | 64,499 | 39.12 | |
| INC | D. Y. Das | 2195 | 1.35 | |
| NOTA | None Of The Above | 1733 | 1.05 | |
| Majority | | 29,690 | 18 | |
| Turnout | | 1,64,869 | | |
| TDP gain from YSRCP | | Swing | | |
