= Mandala Venkata Swamy Naidu =

Indian politician

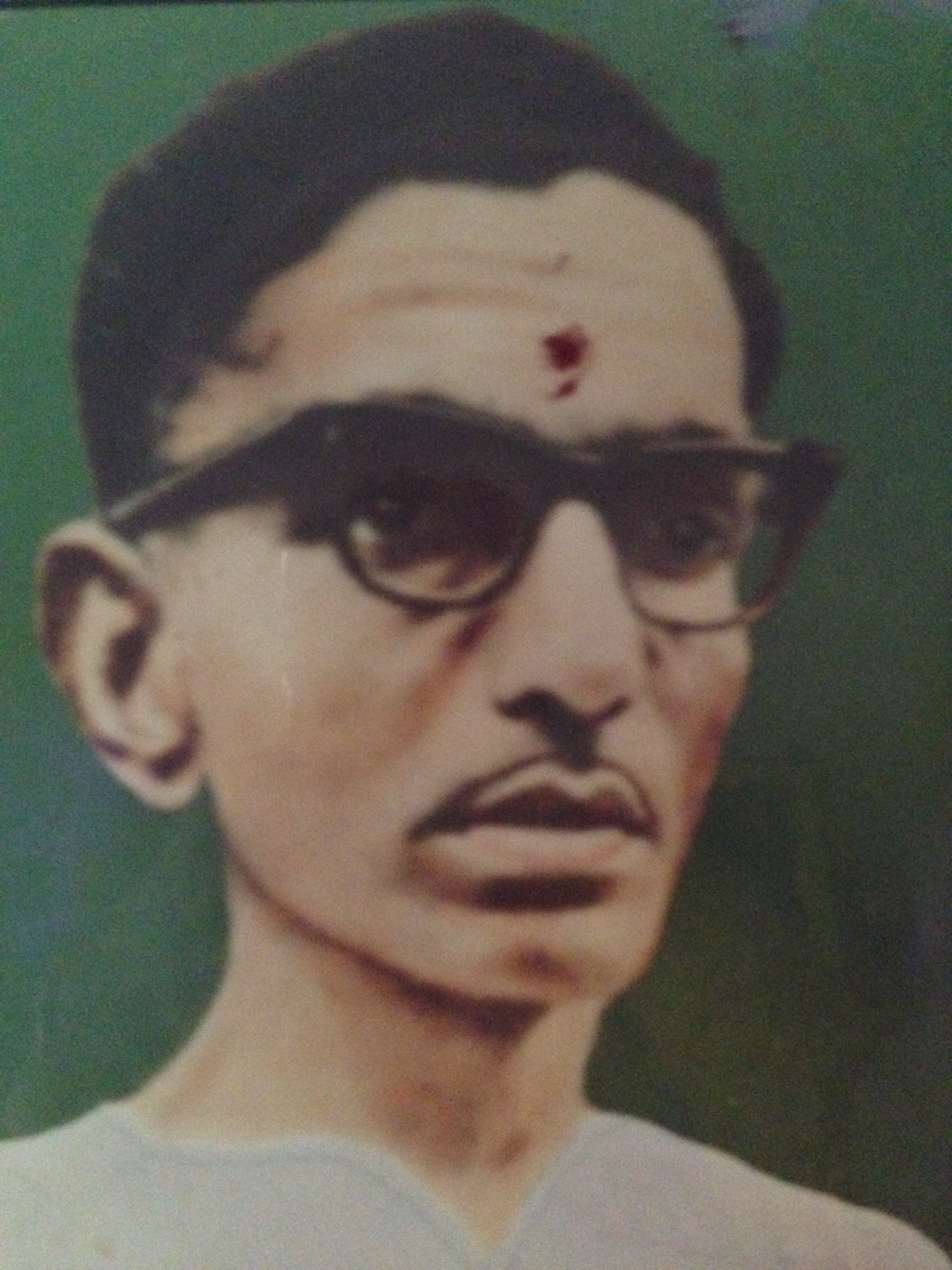

Mandala Venkata Swamy Naidu (born 15 January 1919, date of death unknown) was an Indian politician who was a member of parliament for the Machilipatnam Lok Sabha constituency from 1962 to 1967.

== Early life ==
Swamy was born to Mandala Subbarao Naidu on 15 January 1919. He hailed from a Talagadadevi village in the Coastal Andhra region. He was adopted by his uncle Mandala Rama Swamy Saidu and Smt. Saraswati and brought up as their own child. His primary school education was done in Avinagadda, completing his Plus 2 at Bandaru Noble college. He then attended Madras Christian College, graduating with a bachelor's degree. After graduating he worked as a secretary in Madras for two years, before returning to his hometown.

== Career ==
Swamy competed in the elections as an independent candidate and won in 1962. He worked as President - Avanigadda Panchayat Samithi, Vice Chairman - Krishna Jilla Parishad, President - Divi Land Mortgage bank, President - District Village Officers Association, President - State Village Officers Association, Director - Andhra Pradesh State Industrial Development Corporation.

== Legacy ==
Swamy was known as the Lord (Zamindar) in his village and surroundings since he inherited ancestral properties that he donated to the needy or gifted to his family. He built the Durga temple (Ganapeswaram Durga temple) and the yearly festivities (Jatara) are carried on by his sons.

== Personal life ==
M. V. Swamy married Shrimati Nageswaramma on 26 February 1943. They had two daughters, Ramadevi Velivala and. Bhavani Saripalli and three sons, Ramakrishna Mandala, Rambabu Mandala and Muralidhar Mandala.
