= Nagayalanka =

- Village
- Interactive map of Nagayalanka
- Location in Andhra Pradesh, India Nagayalanka (India)
- Coordinates: 15.9500°N 80.9167°E
- Country: India
- State: Andhra Pradesh
- District: Krishna
- Mandal: Nagayalanka

Area
  - Total: 12.60 km^{2} (4.86 sq mi)
- Elevation: 10 m (33 ft)

Population (2011)
  - Total: 9,321
  - Density: 739.8/km^{2} (1,916/sq mi)

Languages
  - Official: Telugu
- Time zone: UTC+5:30 (IST)
- PIN: 521 120
- Telephone code: +91–08671
- Vehicle registration: AP 16

Nagayalanka is a village in Krishna district of Indian state of Andhra Pradesh. It is the mandal headquarters of Nagayalanka mandal in Machilipatnam revenue division.

== Geography ==
15.9500°N 80.9167°E. It has an average elevation of 10 metres 10 m (33 ft).

== Demographics ==
As of 2011 census, the village had a population of 9,321. The total population constitutes, 4,851 males and 4,470 females —a sex ratio of 922 females per 1000 males. 744 children are in the age group of 0–6 years, of which 431 are boys and 313 are girls —a ratio of 726 per 1000. The average literacy rate stands at 83.56% with 7,167 literates, significantly higher than the state average of 67.41%.

== Economy ==
The oil well in Nagayalanka onshore block has largest oil deposits of KG basin, with approximately 480 million barrels (76 million cubic metres) of oil equivalent.

Along with the collaboration of state government Andhra Pradesh and ministry of finance government of India, DRDO officially announced its missile launching station in Nagayalanka. All other procedures for establishing the same were cleared as on 28 June 2018.
