= Sugguna lanka =

Village in Guntur (Andhra Pradesh), India

Sugguna Lanka
- Village
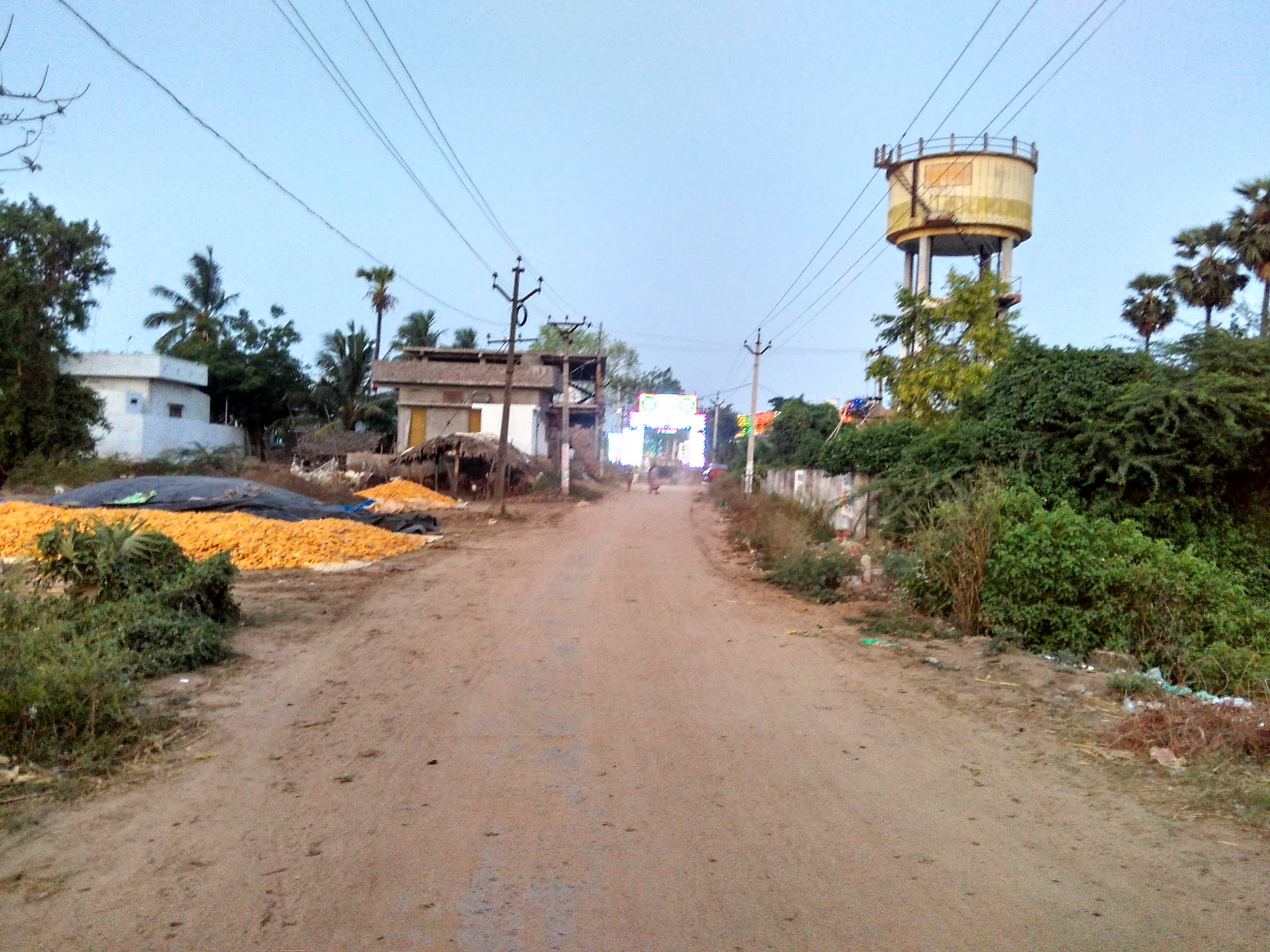
- Sugguna Lanka Village Entrance
- Interactive map of Sugguna Lanka
- Location in Andhra Pradesh, India
- Coordinates: 16°14′00″N 80°48′51″E
- Country: India
- State: Andhra Pradesh
- District: Bapatla

Population (2011)
  - Total: 865

Languages
  - Official: Telugu తెలుగు
- Time zone: UTC+5:30 (IST)
- PIN: 522 301
- Telephone code: +91–8644

Sugguna Lanka is a village in Kollur mandal, located in Bapatla district of Andhra Pradesh in India. The name of this village is derived from the last name Sugguna. It is located 48km East of Guntur, 25km from Tenali, 8km from Kolluru, 326km from Hyderabad.

Sugguna Lanka Pin code is 521247 and postal head office is Meduru.

Annavarapu Lanka (2km), Chilumuru (3km), Pedalanka (4km), Ananthavaram (5km), Kolluru (6km) are nearby villages to Sugguna Lanka. Sugguna Lanka is a village surrounded by Pamidimukkala Mandal in the, Vemuru Mandal in the West, Kollipara Mandal in the West, Thotlavalluru Mandal in North-West.

Tenali, Repalle, Gudivada, Machilipatnam are the nearby major towns to Sugguna Lanka.

This place is in the border of the Guntur District and Krishna District. Krishna District Movva lies in the East of this place.

== Language ==
Telugu is the local language here.

== Transport ==
=== By rail ===
Vemuru Railway Station is the nearest railway station to Sugguna Lanka. However, Vijayawada Railway Junction is major railway station which is 42km to Sugguna Lank.

=== By road ===
Repalle, Tenali are the nearby towns to Sugguna Lanka having road connectivity to Sugguna Lanka.

=== By bus ===
Kolluru Bus Station, Movva Bus Station are the nearby Bus Stations to Sugguna Lanka. APSRTC runs Number of buses from major towns to here.

== Colleges ==
K V S R T Jr College Address : Chilumuru

== Schools ==
Arvindasri School Address : Chilumuru, Kolluru, Guntur, Andhra Pradesh - 522301, Post - Anantavaram

Sri Rama Rural High School Address : Chilumuru, Kolluru, Guntur, Andhra Pradesh - 522301, Post - Anantavaram

ZPHS Ananthavaram Address : Ananthavaram, Kolluru, Guntur District, Andhra Pradesh - 522301, Post - Anantavaram

Bus Stops Patamata Lankapalli Bus Stop at a distance of about 4.4 km A.V.G. Palem Bus Stop Annavaram Bus Stop at a distance of about 4.7 km Iluru Bus Stop at a distance of about 5.0 km Kuderu Bus Stop at a distance of about 5.4 km

ATMs Main road; Inapuru; Andhra Pradesh 521247; India at a distance of 3.8 km Andhra Bank ATM, Ananthavaram; Andhra Pradesh 522301; India at a distance of 4.9 km State Bank ATM, Kolluru; Andhra Pradesh 522324; India at a distance of 6.3 km State Bank ATM, Meduru; Andhra Pradesh 521247; India at a distance of 7.7 km distance

CINEMA HALLS Srinivasa Cinema Hall, Kolluru; Andhra Pradesh 522324; at a distance of 6.0 km Shivaram theatre, Guntur; Andhra Pradesh 522301; at a distance of 9.6 km Satyanarayana Talkies, Vemuru; Andhra Pradesh 522261; at distance of 10.9 km Sivaram Theatre, Buthumalli Adda Road; Kollipara; Andhra Pradesh 522261; at a distance of 12.0 km

TEMPLES Siva Alayam Temples in Sugguna Lanka; Andhra Pradesh 521247; at a distance of 0.7 km Ankamma Talli Temple, Sugguna Lanka; Andhra Pradesh 521247; at a distance of 0.7 km రామ మందిరం, Sugguna Lanka; Andhra Pradesh 521247; at a distance of 0.7 km శ్రీరామ మందిరం; కాపులూరు, Yadlapalli; Andhra Pradesh 522301; at a distance of 0.8 km
