= Vuyyuru mandal =

- Mandal
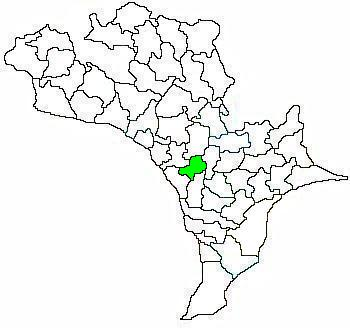
- Location of Vuyyuru mandal in Krishna district
- Interactive Map Outlining mandal
- Location in Andhra Pradesh, India
- Coordinates: 16°22′N 80°51′E
- Country: India
- State: Andhra Pradesh
- District: Krishna
- Headquarters: Vuyyuru

Area
  - Total: 103.18 km^{2} (39.84 sq mi)

Population (2011)
  - Total: 76,703
  - Density: 743.39/km^{2} (1,925.4/sq mi)

Languages
  - Official: Telugu
- Time zone: UTC+5:30 (IST)

Vuyyuru mandal is one of the 25 mandals in Krishna district of the Indian state of Andhra Pradesh.It was under Nuzvid Estate from Velama caste.Raja used to live in Vuyyuru fort/kota near ag and Sg college.It is under the administration of Vuyyuru revenue division and the headquarters are located at Vuyyuru town. The mandal is bounded by Kankipadu, Unguturu, Thotlavalluru, Pedaparupudi and Pamidimukkala mandals. The mandal is also a part of the Andhra Pradesh Capital Region under the jurisdiction of APCRDA.

== Towns and villages ==
As of 2011 census, the mandal has 13 villages.

The settlements in the mandal are listed below:

1. Akunuru
2. Bollapadu
3. China Ogirala
4. Jabarlapudi
5. Kadavakollu
6. Mudunuru
7. Peda Ogirala
8. Saipuram
9. Veeravalli Mokhasa
10. Vuyyuru
11. Katuru
12. Kalavapamula
13. Ramachandrapuram
14. Gandigunta

== See also ==
- List of villages in Krishna district
