= Anantharam =

Anantharam may refer to:

== Places in India ==
- Anantharam, Bhongir mandal, Nalgonda district, Telangana
- Anantharam, Shamirpet mandal, Ranga Reddy district, Telangana
- Anantharam, Medak district, Telangana

== Other uses ==
- Anantaram, a 1987 Indian Malayalam film

== See also ==
- Ananthavaram (disambiguation)
