= Ogirala =

Ogirala is a (Telugu: ఓగిరాల) a Telugu surname and may refer to:

- Ogirala, village in Bapulapadu mandal in Krishna District, Andhra Pradesh, India
- Peda Ogirala, village in Vuyyuru mandal, Krishna district, Andhra Pradesh, India
- China Ogirala, village in Vuyyuru mandal, Krishna district, Andhra Pradesh, India
- Ogirala Ramachandra Rao, famous playback singer and music director in Indian cinema (1905–1957)
