= Chandra Mohan (Telugu actor) =

Indian actor (died 2023)

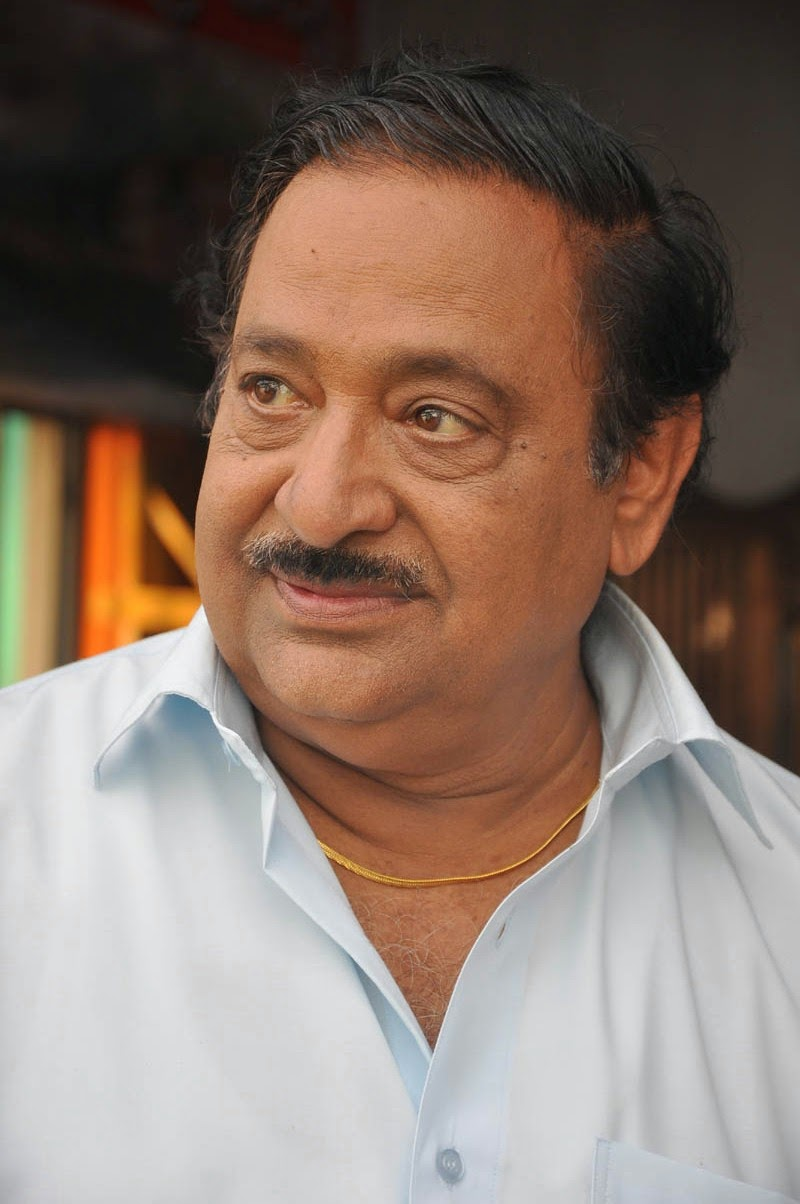
- Mohan in 2015
- Born: Mallampalli Chandrasekhara Rao; 23 May 1945; Pamidimukkala, Madras Province, British India
- Died: 11 November 2023 (aged 78); Hyderabad, Telangana, India
- Occupation: Actor
- Years active: 1966–2023

Chandra Mohan (born Mallampalli Chandrasekhara Rao; 23 May 1945 – 11 November 2023) was an Indian actor known for his work predominantly in Telugu films. He won a Filmfare Award South and two Nandi Awards.

== Early life ==
Mohan was born as Mallampalli Chandrasekhara Rao on 23 May 1946, in Pamidimukkala village in Krishna district of Andhra Pradesh. He was educated at Y.V.R.M.Z.P. High School at Meduru. He graduated from the agriculture college of Bapatla. He was a cousin of veteran filmmaker K. Viswanath and legendary singer S. P. Balasubrahmanyam.

== Career ==
Mohan was introduced to the Telugu film industry through the film Rangula Ratnam in 1966. In 1968, he starred in Sukha Duhkalu, as the caring brother of Vanisri's character, for which he received awards.

Mohan received critical reception for his performance in box office hits such as Rangula Ratnam (1966) for which he received the state Nandi Award for Best Actor, Padaharella Vayasu (1978) for which he won the Filmfare Best Actor Award (Telugu), and Siri Siri Muvva (1978). His first Tamil film was Naalai Namadhe (1975). Some of the films in which he starred as the lead actor are Seetamalakshmi (1978), Ram Robert Rahim (1980), Radha Kalyanam (1981), Rendu Rellu Aaru (1986), and Chandamama Raave (1987).

== Death ==
After suffering cardiac-related issues, Mohan was admitted to Apollo Hospital in Hyderabad. He died on 11 November 2023, at the age of 78.

== Awards ==
Nandi Awards

- Best Male Comedian – Chandamama Raave (1987)
- Best Character Actor – Athanokkade (2005)

Filmfare Awards South

- Best Actor Award – Telugu – Padaharella Vayasu (1978)

== Filmography ==
=== Telugu films ===
List of Chandra Mohan Telugu film credits
Year	Title	Role	Notes
1966	Rangula Ratnam	Vasu	
1968	Bangaru Pichika		
1968	Bandhavyalu		
1968	Sukha Dukhalu		
1969	Sri Rama Katha	Manmadha	
1969	Aatmiyulu	Chandram	
1969	Karpura Harathi	Vasu	
1970	Talli Tandrulu		
1970	Jagath Jetteelu	Mohan	
1970	Sambarala Rambabu		
1971	Bomma Borusa	Sekhar	
1971	Atthalu Kodallu	Chandram	
1971	Anuradha	Mohan	
1971	Revolver Rani	Chinna	
1971	Chelleli Kapuram		
1971	Manasu Mangalyam		
1971	Ramalayam	Son of Kantham	
1972	Kalam Marindi		
1972	Kalavari Kutumbam	Madhu	
1973	Jeevana Tarangalu	Ananth	
1973	Meena	Burrakatha Performer	
1973	Stree		
1973	Ganga Manga		
1973	Mayadari Malligadu	Dancer in the temple festival	Special Appearance
1974	Alluri Seetharama Raju	Govindu	
1974	O Seeta Katha	Chandram	
1974	Devadasu		
1974	Ammayi Pelli	Ravi	
1974	Mangalya Bhagyam	Raja	
1975	Devudu Chesina Pelli	Ravi	
1975	Ammayila Sapatham		
1975	Bhagasthulu	Chandram	
1975	Yashoda Krishna	Narada	
1976	Padi Pantalu	Suresh	
1976	Secretary	Siva Ram	
1976	Siri Siri Muvva	Sambayya	
1976	Vintha Illu Santhagola	Mohan	
1977	Kurukshetram	Abhimanyu	
1977	Khaidi Kalidasu	Raghu	
1977	Jeevithamlo Vasantham	Dr. Kumar	
1977	Devathalara Deevinchandi	Muralikrishna	
1978	Padaharella Vayasu	Gopala Krishna	
1978	Love Marriage	Mohan	
1978	Pranam Khareedu	Devudu	
1978	Seetamalakshmi	Kondayya	
1978	Karunamayudu	Bartimaeus	
1979	Sankarabharanam	Kameswara Rao	
1979	Oka Challani Rathri	Murthy	
1979	Pancha Bhoothalu		
1979	Tayaramma Bangarayya		
1979	Intinti Ramayanam		
1979	Korikale Gurralaite		
1979	Mangala Toranalu		
1979	Sangham Chekkina Silpalu		
1979	Mande Gundelu		
1979	Nagamalli		
1980	Ram Robert Rahim	Rahim	
1980	Gayyali Gangamma		
1980	Bommala Koluvu		
1980	Konte Mogudu Penki Pellam	Gopi	
1980	Subhodhayam	Chandram	
1980	Badai Basavayya	Kishtayya	
1980	Mama Allulla Saval	Gopi	
1981	Priya		
1981	Swargam	Srinath	
1981	Radha Kalyanam	Palghat Madhavan	
1981	Pakkinti Ammayi	Bujji	
1981	Pranaya Geetham		
1981	Satyabhama		
1982	Kalahala Kapuram	Radha Krishna	
1982	Ilantha Sandadi		
1982	Kayyala Ammayi Kalavari Abbayi	Kiran	
1982	Kotha Neeru		
1983	Santoshimata Vratam		
1983	Kanthayya Kanakayya	Krishna	
1983	Raju Rani Jackie	Raju	
1983	Moodu Mullu	Masteru	
1983	Pelli Choopulu		
1984	Adigo Alladigo		
1984	Inti Guttu		
1984	Kanchana Ganga	Prabhakar	
1984	Rama Rao Gopal Rao		
1984	Sri Santhoshi Matha Vrata Mahatyam		
1984	Padmavyooham		
1984	Suvarna Sundari	Mahati	
1984	Ee Charitra Inkennallu	Mohan Kumar	Guest Role
1985	Muchataga Mugguru	Ram Babu	
1985	Bhale Thammudu		
1985	Pratighatana		
1985	Sri Katna Leelalu	Sambasiva Rao	
1985	Mangalya Bandham		
1985	Mugguru Mitrulu		
1985	Siksha	Priest	
1985	Srivaru	Chandramohan	
1986	Rendu Rellu Aaru	Sadguna Rao	
1986	Konte Kapuram		
1986	Naa Pilupe Prabhanjanam	Bhanuprasad	
1986	Chaitanyam		
1986	Ashtalakshmi Vaibhavam		
1986	Vikram		
1986	Chantabbai	Kalyan	
1986	Sri Shirdi Saibaba Mahathyam	Nanavali	
1986	Aakrandana	Dhananjaya Rao	
1987	Gandhinagar Rendava Veedhi	Prasad	
1987	Manmadha Leela Kamaraju Gola	Manmadha	
1987	Srimathi Oka Bahumathi		
1987	Dayamayudu		
1987	Ummadi Mogudu		
1987	America Abbayi		
1987	Makutamleni Maharaju	Ganapathi	
1987	Kaboye Alludu	Ram Babu	
1987	Alludu Kosam	Krishna Rao	
1987	Bhargava Ramudu		
1987	Damit Katha Adam Thirigindi	Chandram, Parvateesam, Ganapathi	Triple role
1987	Naku Pellam Kavali	Ramudu	
1987	Swathantraniki Oopiri Poyandi		
1987	Dabbevariki Chedu	Lakshmikanth	
1988	Trinetrudu	Saleem	
1988	Prema Kireetam	Abhirama	
1988	Asthulu Anthasthulu	Sivaiah	
1988	Thodallullu	Mohan	
1988	Sagatu Manishi		
1988	Aadadhe Aadharam		
1988	Chilipi Dampatulu		
1988	Bharya Bhartala Bhagotham	Ganapathi	
1988	O Bharya Katha	Sivaram	
1988	Aakhari Poratam		
1988	Chinnodu Peddodu	Peddodu	
1988	Vivaha Bhojanambu	Vasu Rao	
1989	Sakshi	Shekar	
1989	Zoo Laka Taka	Madhava Chary	
1989	Ayyappa Swamy Mahatyam		
1989	Oorantha Golanta		
1989	Aarthanadham	Chandra Mohan	
1989	Two Town Rowdy		
1989	Chennapatnam Chinnollu	Dasu	
1989	Preminchi Choodu	Mohan	
1989	Jayammu Nischayammu Raa	Suribabu	
1989	Geethanjali		
1989	Chinnari Sneham		
1990	Ramba Rambabu	Narada Maharshi	
1990	Intinta Deepavali		
1990	Balachandrudu		
1990	Alludugaru	Anand	
1991	Aditya 369	Tenali Rama Krishna	Guest Appearance
1991	Viyyala Vari Vindhu		
1991	Intlo Pilli Veedhilo Puli		
1991	Kalikalam		
1991	Jaitra Yatra		
1992	Peddarikam	Rama Krishna	
1992	Sahasam		
1992	Repati Koduku		
1992	President Gari Pellam		
1992	Chillara Mogudu Allari Koduku		
1993	Chitikela Pandiri		
1993	Vintha Kodallu		
1993	Kalachakram		
1993	Pelli Gola		
1994	Aame	Subrahmanyam	
1994	Kourava Samrajyam		
1994	Ammayi Kapuram		
1994	Kalikalam Aadadhi		
1994	Alludu Poru Ammayi Joru		
1994	Thodi Kodallu		
1994	Kurradhi Kurradu	Chandra Mohan	
1995	Sankalpam		
1995	Telugu Veera Levara	Govindu	
1995	Mayabazaar		
1995	Gulabi	Chandu's father	
1995	Real Hero		
1995	Ammaleni Puttillu		
1996	Ramudochadu	Chandraiah	
1996	Akkada Ammayi Ikkada Abbayi		
1996	Maa Inti Aadapaduchu		
1996	Kuturu		
1996	Ninne Pelladata	Murthy	
1996	Pellala Rajyam		
1997	Preminchukundam Raa	Chakrapani	
1997	Priya O Priya		
1997	Encounter		
1997	Kurralla Rajyam		
1998	Chandralekha	Pandu	
1998	Rajahamsa		
1998	Pape Naa Pranam		
1998	Suprabhatam	Kutumba Rao	
1998	Yuvaratna Rana		
1998	Aahaa...!		
1998	Premante Idera	Subba Rao	
1998	Andaru Herole		
1998	Subhavartha		
1999	Iddaru Mitrulu	Vijay's father	
1999	Swapnalokam		
1999	Raja		
1999	Anaganaga O Ammai		
1999	Ravoyi Chandamama	Meghana's father	
1999	Thammudu	Kutumba Rao	
1999	Seetharama Raju	Raghava Raju	
2000	Manoharam	Usha's father	
2000	Maa Pelliki Randi	Anjali's father	
2000	Rayalaseema Ramanna Chowdary		
2000	Chiru Navvutho	Venu's uncle	
2000	Maa Annayya	Sumathi's father	
2000	Tirumala Tirupati Venkatesa		
2000	Vijayaramaraju		
2001	Manasanta Nuvve	Mohan Rao	
2001	Darling Darling	Pedarayudu	
2001	Ishtam	Subbu	
2001	Nuvvu Naaku Nachav	Sekharam	
2002	Priya Nestama	Pooja's father	
2002	Nuvve Nuvve	Rishi's father	
2002	Nuvvu Leka Nenu Lenu	Siva Prasad	
2002	Pilisthe Palukutha		
2002	Santosham	Chandram	
2002	Manmadhudu	Maheswari's father	
2002	Ninu Choodaka Nenundalenu		
2003	Okkadu	Swapna's father	
2003	Dongodu		
2003	Sambhu		
2003	Vasantham	Peter	
2004	Aaptudu	Chandram	
2004	7G Brindavan Colony	Ravi's father	Bilingual film; acted only in Telugu version
2004	Varsham	Venkat's uncle	
2005	Andagadu		
2005	Andarivadu		
2005	Athanokkade	Ram's foster father	
2005	Jagapati	Murari's father	
2005	Nuvvostanante Nenoddantana	Jailor	
2005	Sankranti	Rama Chandraiah	
2006	Ranam	Chinna's father	
2006	Evandoi Srivaru		
2006	Allare Allari		
2006	Valliddari Vayasu Padahare	Puja's father	
2006	Boss	Girls Orphanage warden	
2006	Pournami	Subhramanyam	
2006	Chinnodu	Jailor	
2006	Raraju	Surya's father	
2007	Desamuduru	Chandra Mohan	
2007	Dhee	Narayana Rao	
2007	Hello Premistara		
2007	Satyabhama		
2007	State Rowdy		
2007	Yogi	Chandranna	
2008	Baladoor	Purushotham	
2008	Chintakayala Ravi	Chintakayala Govinda Rao	
2008	Donga Sachinollu		
2008	Hare Ram		
2008	King	Narayana	
2008	Krishna	Chandra Shekar	
2008	Maa Ayana Chanti Pilladu		
2008	Ready	Janaki's father	
2008	Siddu From Sikakulam	Siddhu's Father	
2008	Ullasamga Utsahamga	Narayana Rao	
2009	Mestri		
2009	Sankham	Krishna Rao / Kittu	
2010	Namo Venkatesa	Narayana	
2010	Sambho Siva Sambho	Mohan	
2010	Dasanna		
2010	Panchakshari	Udayshankar Verma	
2010	Darling	Bhadram	
2011	Mirapakaay	Vishwanath Shastri	
2011	Wanted	Ram Babu	
2011	Money, Money More Money		
2011	Kandireega	Vishwanatham	
2011	Dookudu	Tulasi Ram	
2012	Tuneega Tuneega	Priest	
2012	Yamudiki Mogudu	Naresh's Father	
2012	Genius	Narayana	
2013	Sarocharu	Sandhya's father	
2013	Okkadine		
2013	Sukumarudu		
2013	Baadshah	Baadshah's maternal uncle	
2013	Ramachari	Kotachari	
2013	Potugadu	Neelakanta Shastri	
2014	Pilla Nuvvu Leni Jeevitham	Chandra Mohan	
2014	Loukyam	Meka Papa Rao "Puppy"	
2015	Bandipotu		
2015	Mosagallaku Mosagadu	Masterji	
2015	James Bond	Nani's father	
2015	Lion	Bhoopathi	
2016	Manamantha	Sairam's Father	
2016	Hyper	Priest	
2017	Duvvada Jagannadham	DJ's Uncle	
2017	Goutham Nanda	Nanda Kishore's father	
2017	Mister	Senior Pichchaiah Naidu's brother	
2017	Oxygen	Sanjeev's father	

=== Tamil films ===
List of Chandra Mohan Tamil film credits
Year	Title	Role	Notes
1971	Sudarum Sooravaliyum		
1975	Naalai Namadhe	Radhan	
1978	Andaman Kadhali	Madhan	
1979	Neeya?	Naga Raja	
1981	Deiva Thirumanangal	Lord Siva	
1999	Time	Car driver	
2012	Saguni	Satyamurthy	Guest appearance

=== Television ===
- Gangato Rambabu – Zee Telugu as Kameshwara Shastri
