= Kollur =

Kollur may refer to:

== Places ==
=== Andhra Pradesh, India ===
- Kollur, Bapatla district, a village in Bapatla district, Andhra Pradesh, India
- Kolluru, Nalgonda district, Andhra Pradesh, India
- Kolluru, Srikakulam district, Andhra Pradesh, India

=== Telangana, India ===
- Kollur, Ranga Reddy district, a village in Ranga Reddy district, Telangana, India

=== Karnataka, India ===
- Kollur, Udupi district, a town in Udupi district, Karnataka, India
- Kollur, Bagalkot district, a village in Bilagi taluka, Bagalkot district, Karnataka, India
- Kollur, Chincholi taluka, a village in Chincholi taluka, Gulbarga district, Karnataka, India
- Kollur, Chitapur taluka, a village in Chitapur taluka, Gulbarga district, Karnataka, India
- Kollur, Gulbarga taluka, a village in Gulbarga taluka, Gulbarga district, Karnataka, India
- Kollur, Shahapur taluka, a village in Shahpur, Karnataka taluka, Yadgir district, Karnataka, India

== Tehsils ==
- Kollur mandal, a tehsil in Guntur district, Andhra Pradesh, India

== Other ==
- Kollur Mine, one of the world's most productive diamond mines
