= Chilumuru =

Village in Andhra Pradesh, India

- Village
- Interactive map of Chilumuru
- Location in Andhra Pradesh, India
- Coordinates: 16.2302916°N 80.7844066°E
- Country: India
- State: Andhra Pradesh
- District: Bapatla
- Mandal: Kollur

Government
  - Type: Panchayati raj
  - Body: Chilumuru gram panchayat

Area
  - Total: 475 ha (1,170 acres)

Population (2011)
  - Total: 3,174
  - Density: 668/km^{2} (1,730/sq mi)

Languages
  - Official: Telugu
- Time zone: UTC+5:30 (IST)
- Area code: +91–
- Vehicle registration: AP

Chilumuru is a village in the Bapatla district of the Indian state of Andhra Pradesh. It is located in the Kollur mandal of Tenali revenue division.

== Geography ==
Chilumuru is situated to the north of the mandal headquarters, Kolluru, at 16.2302916°N 80.7844066°E. It is spread over an area of 475 ha (1,170 acres).

== Government and politics ==
Chilumuru gram panchayat is the local self-government of the village. It is divided into wards, and each ward is represented by a ward member. The village forms a part of Andhra Pradesh Capital Region and is under the jurisdiction of APCRDA.

== Education ==
As per the school information report for the academic year 2018–19, the village has a total of 6 schools. These include 3 MPP and 3 private schools.

== Religious Landmark ==
=== Ubaya Rameswara Kshetram ===
Located on the banks of the Krishna River, the Ubaya Rameswara Kshetram is a prominent historical and religious site in Chilumuru. The temple is dedicated to Shiva, worshipped here as Rameswara in the form of a Saikata Lingam (a deity fashioned from sand).

==== Historical Background ====
While local tradition ascribes the temple's origins to the Treta Yuga, the physical stone structure dates to the Chola dynasty in the 12th century. Epigraphical evidence and temple inscriptions indicate that the current sanctum was constructed around 1153 AD.

==== Legend and Local Lore ====
According to the Skanda Purana, the temple was established by Lord Rama during his return from Lanka. Legend states that because Hanuman was delayed in bringing a Lingam from Kailasa, Sita Devi created one from the river sand to meet the auspicious muhurtam. To accommodate the Lingam later brought by Hanuman, a second temple was established directly across the river in Iluru. The two shrines are collectively known as Ubaya Rameswara Kshetram (the "Dual Shrines of Rameswara").

The site remains a major center for pilgrims during Maha Shivaratri and the holy month of Karthika, when devotees perform ritual dips in the Krishna River.

== Connectivity ==
Chilumuru is accessible via a variety of public, private, and river transport modes:

- Road: The village is situated 3 km from Kollur, 18 km from Tenali, and 53 km from Vijayawada.
  - Public Transport: The APSRTC operates the Karakatta Express (Vijayawada–Repalle route), which provides direct access to the village.
  - Local Transport: Auto-rickshaws and private vehicles are the primary means of local transit, with frequent services available from the nearby hubs of Kollur and Tenali.
- Rail: The nearest major railway station is Tenali Junction, located 18 km away.
- Air: Vijayawada International Airport is the closest airport, approximately 65 km from the village.
- River: Direct access to the sister shrine in Iluru is available via local boat services across the Krishna River. However, these services are seasonal and highly dependent on water levels; boat frequency is significantly reduced or restricted during periods of high river flow or when the river is low.
