= Alinakhi Palem =

Village in Andhra Pradesh, India

- Village
- Interactive map of Alinakhi Palem
- Location within Andhra Pradesh
- Coordinates: 16°14′12″N 80°52′02″E
- Country: India
- State: Andhra Pradesh
- District: Krishna
- Mandal: Pamidimukkala

Area
  - Total: 1.2 km^{2} (0.46 sq mi)

Population
  - Total: 2,000

Languages
  - Official: Urdu
- Time zone: UTC+5:30 (IST)
- PIN CODE: 521 250

Alinakhi Palem is a village near by Choragudi Panchayat present in Pamidimukkala mandal of Krishna district of Andhra Pradesh state, India. It is situated at an altitude of 09 ft above sea-level. A survey by Madras Office in 1926 by Sri Govindarajulu and LGB Firth displayed its assigned numbers. AP supplementary survey in 1965 by Sri V. Sriramulu included it in Gannavaram Taluk of Krishna district.

- The official language is Urdu
- It has an Urdu Upper Primary School with 150 children.
- The Alinakhi Palem post office pin code is 521 250 and postal head office is Virankilock.
- It is mostly a mason's, teacher's and engineer's village with 500+ families.
- Near cities Vijayawada (60 km), Machilipatnam (35 km), Vuyyuru (19 km).
- Penumatcha (2 km), Krishnapuram (2 km), Lankapalli (3 km), Kuderu (3 km), Inapuru (4 km) are the nearby Villages to Alinakhi Palem.

Alinakhi Palem is bordered by Movva Mandal towards the east, Ghantasala Mandal and Challapalli Mandal towards the south, and Kollur Mandal towards the west.

== Oral History ==
Ruler of Golconda and the last ruler of Qutub Shahi Dynasty, Abul Hasan Tanisha (A.D.1672-1686) invited Mullah Mohammed's Ali from Isfahan in Iran to come to India to teach his Children. Eldest son of Mullah, Haider Ali Naqi Isfahani and two families settled here. Other families joined and a small hub of Shia community gradually emerged. The village derives its name from the first settler and is called Alinakhi Palem or Ali Naqi's Village.

== Transport ==
=== Rail ===
There is no railway station within 20 km of Alinakhi Palem.

Nearest railway stations are Vijayawada Junction (BZA), Machilipatnam Junction (MTM), Gudivada Junction (GDV).

=== Road ===
National Highways near Alinakhi Palem

- National High Way: NH65
- National High Way: NH16

Vijayawada, Vuyyuru, Kuchipudi are the nearby towns with road connectivity to Alinakhi Palem.
