= Ananthavaram =

Ananthavaram or Ananthawaram may refer to several places in India:

- Ananthavaram, Kollur mandal, Guntur district, Andhra Pradesh
- Ananthavaram, Thullur mandal, a neighbourhood of Amaravati, Andhra Pradesh
- Ananthawaram, Ranga Reddy district, Telangana

== See also ==
- Anantharam (disambiguation)
