= List of zamindari estates in the Krishna District =

Zamindars of Krishna district hold an important place in the history of Madras Presidency. Krishna district holds some huge Zamindari estates like Nuzvid Estate, Chintalapati Vantu, Devarakota, Repalle, Vallur etc. which are both extensive and wealthy estates.

== Permanent Settlement ==
In 1802, the British after settling the facts with Nizam and Local Poligars and Zamindars they made permanent settlement in which they issued sanads to pay the government peskash annually. There are many ancient Zamindaries in this district, and also newly formed but Most influential Zamindars too. when Charles Donald Maclean surveyed about the zamindaries in the Madras Presidency he mentioned 34 Zamindaries in the District. They are:

List of Zamindaris in Krishna District in the year 1874-75
Zamindari	Holder	Peskash
Krishna district
Nuzvid Estate		95,443
Virsanapettah		20,829
Challapalli		81,397
Chintalapati Vantu		17,500
Chevendra		4,776
Chanubanda		1.357
Mylavaram Muttah 1.25 vantu		4,858
Mylavaram Muttah 1 vantu		3,887
Vutukur Muttah		2,156
Half of Tiruvur Muttah		2,117
Yenagadapa Muttah		1,236
Half og Gumpalagudem Muttah		1,295
Western part of Gumpalagudem muttah		1,291
Munagala Paragana		4,572
Vallur South		20,493
Gudur Paragana		35,988
Pinagudur Lanka		319
Kruttiventi South		2,910
Balliparru		459
Kuchipudy		229
Narayanagudem		138
Other Half of Tiruur muttah		2219
Kalagara|		812
Putrela		510
Kondur and Kmbhampad		507
Kokilampad		75
Pengollu		1,262
Munukulla		71
Komera Muttah		703
Lingagiri Pragana		486
Devarapally		451
Rayavaram		908
China Gollapalem		238
Chitti Gudur		524
Source:MaClean, C. D. (1877). Standing Information regarding the Official Administration of Madras Presidency. Government of Madras. pp. 492–493.

== Later ==
After 1877 few years later few other villages and estates from Godavarai District are annexed into Krishna District. Estates were also sub divided and few were transferred from one Zamindar to other.

== Huge Zamindaris ==
- The Banganapalle State is an offshoot of the Nawab of Masulipatam which is in Krishna District.
- Nuzvid Estate comprises 18 paraganas which is nearly about 288 villages.
- Vasireddy family once ruled the Estate over 530 villages etc.
