= Venkatadripuram =

Coordinates: 16°52′N 80°52′E

- village
- Interactive map of Venkatadripuram
- Country: India
- State: Andhra Pradesh

Languages
  - Official: Telugu
- Time zone: UTC+5:30 (IST)

Venkatadripuram is a small village in Nuzvid mandal.

== History ==
This village was built in the 20th century at 1922. The village is 100 years old. It is under panchayati of Annavaram.

The village founder Sri Chalasani Mallikarjunudu from Neppal Vuyyuru Mandal, built a foundation stone in this Village. He gathered some other families from various places of Krishna. The Great Meka Venkatadri Apprao Jamindhar of Vuyyuru eloted 50 ekors of land to this village. Then the Village has called as Venkatadripuram on the name of Raja Venkatadri Apparao.

Sri Sunkara Rajayya from Ponukumadu came to this village and he constructed a house and Dharma Satrava (Inn) in this village, after that the village has called as Satrava Annavarm and Kotta Annavaram.

in 1931 Chalasani Rajagopal Rao was a well known freedom fighter from this village, who participated in the 1931 to 1933 independence movement and he arrested at the movement. Then the village became popular from that Independence movement. Sri Bobba Venkateswara Rao also arrested at the movement in 1950. He participated in "Telangana Armed Struggle" (Anti Nizam Movement).

== Geography ==
A pond is located in the eastern side of village called Kavati Cheruvu. At the western side an area of 152 ekors forest land covered with hills. This land distributed to land less poor in 1985.
