= Dattatreyudu Nori =

Indian-American oncologist

Dr. Dattatreyudu Nori
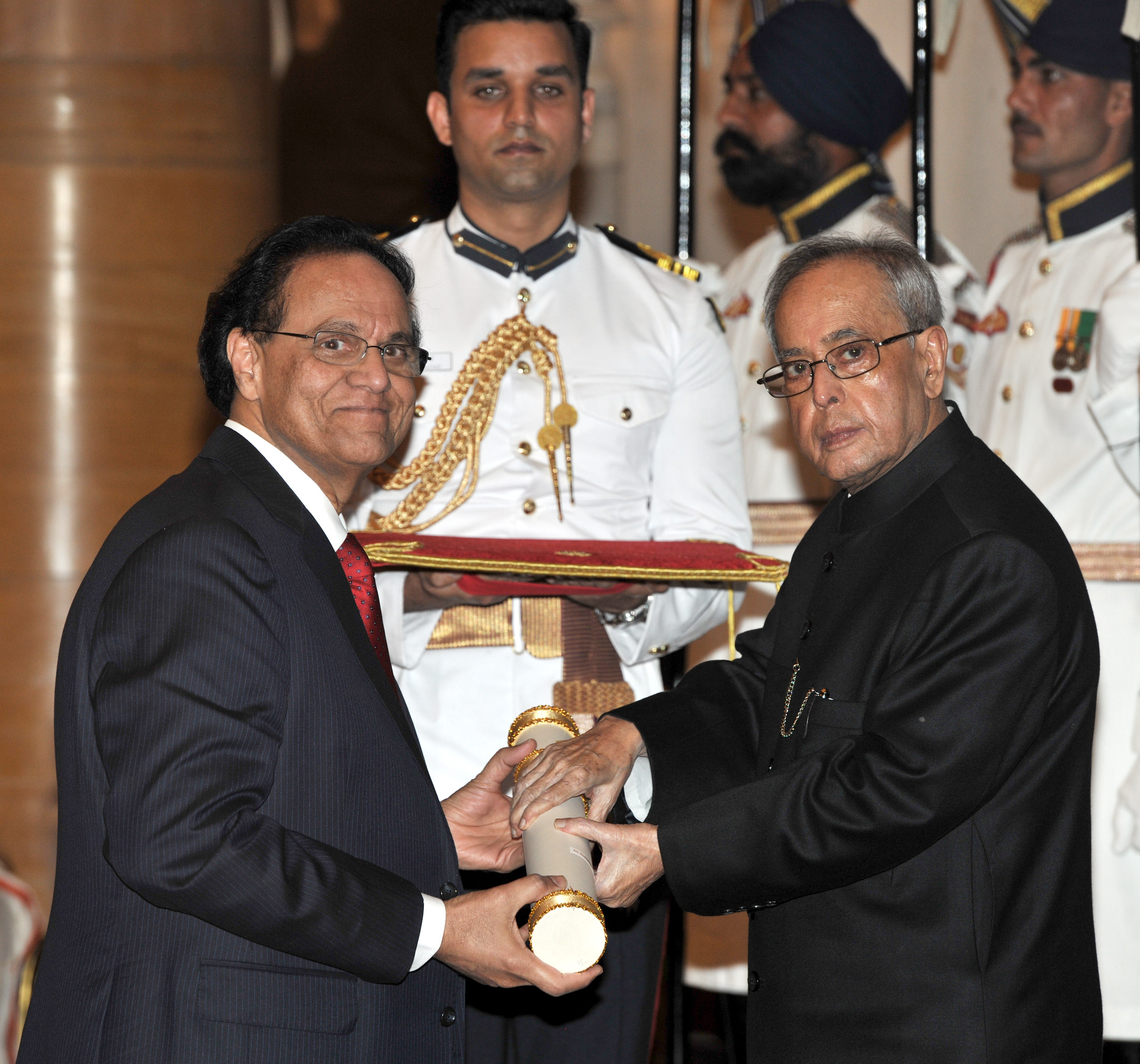
- Dattatreyudu Nori (left) receiving the Padma Shri award from the President of India Shri Pranab Mukherjee (right).
- Born: 1947 (age 78–79); Mantada, Madras State (now in Andhra Pradesh), India
- Education: M.D.
- Known for: Radiation oncology
- Medical career
- Institutions: Memorial Sloan Kettering Cancer Center
- Awards: Padma Shri (2015); Padma Bhushan (2026)

Dr. Dattatreyudu Nori is an Indian-American radiation oncologist. He was once named one of the top doctors in America for the treatment of cancers in women by the women's magazine Ladies' Home Journal.

He was appointed as Advisor to Telangana Government (Cancer Care) on 10 March 2025.

He was appointed as Advisor to Telangana Government (Preventive, Curative and Affordable Cancer Care) on 28 June 2025.

== Early life ==
Dattatreyudu Nori was born in a Telugu family in Mantada village, Krishna district of Andhra Pradesh, India. He did his schooling at Machilipatnam. He obtained his medical degree from Kurnool Medical College and Post graduate degree from Osmania Medical College.

Dr. Nori is a Professor and Executive Vice Chairman of the Radiation Oncology Department at The NewYork–Presbyterian Hospital / Weill Cornell Medical College in New York City. In addition, Dr. Nori is the Chairman of Radiation Oncology Unit at the New York Hospital Medical Center of Queens.

== Career ==
Dr. Nori is one of the world's leading authorities in the subspecialty of brachytherapy. In 1979, he was the first physician in the United States to work with a computerized brachytherapy treatment system and develop new techniques through clinical research. He was instrumental in the development and successful application of brachytherapy; the implantation of radioactive seeds to combat cancer. He developed and popularized the transperineal brachytherapy technique, a non-surgical approach for seed implantation, which improved the quality of life for men with prostate cancer. Dr. Nori has been given the 'honor of Tribute to Life' by the American Cancer Society (ACS). The honor was bestowed by Don Distacio, regional director of the ACS in recognition of his contributions to cancer research, patient care and treatment, and education for the past one and a half decades.

== Awards ==
- He was awarded Padma Shri, the fourth-highest civilian award of India, in 2015 for his contributions in the field of medicine.
- He was awarded the third highest civilian award of India Padma Bhushan, in 2026.
