= Mantada =

- Village
- Interactive map of Mantada
- Location in Andhra Pradesh, India Mantada (India)
- Coordinates: 16.3549°N 80.8731°E
- Country: India
- State: Andhra Pradesh
- District: Krishna
- Mandal: Pamidimukkala

Government
  - Type: Gram Panchayat
  - Body: Mantada Gram Panchayat

Area
  - Total: 2.27 km^{2} (0.88 sq mi)
- Elevation: 9 m (30 ft)

Population (2011)
  - Total: 5,268
  - Density: 2,320/km^{2} (6,010/sq mi)

Languages
  - Official: Telugu
- Time zone: UTC+5:30 (IST)
- PIN: 521 256
- Telephone code: +91-08676
- Vehicle registration: AP 16

Mantada is a village in Krishna district of the Indian state of Andhra Pradesh. It is located in Pamidimukkala mandal of Vuyyuru revenue division. Mantada is 31kms away from vijayawada Mantada is 37kms away from machilipatnam nearby railway stations Vijayawada Junction railway station, Gudivada Junction railway station and Machilipatnam railway station
