= Ameenapuram =

- Village
- Interactive map of Ameenapuram
- Location in Andhra Pradesh, India
- Coordinates: 16.307928°N 80.847466°E
- Country: India
- State: Andhra Pradesh
- District: Krishna
- Mandal: Pamidimukkala

Government
  - Type: Gram Panchayat
  - Body: Ameenapuram Gram Panchayat

Area
  - Total: 3.44 km^{2} (1.33 sq mi)
- Elevation: 13 m (43 ft)

Population (2011)
  - Total: 1,178
  - Density: 342/km^{2} (887/sq mi)

Languages
  - Official: Telugu
- Time zone: UTC+5:30 (IST)
- Postal code: 521 247
- Vehicle registration: AP 16

Ameenapuram is a village in Krishna district of the Indian state of Andhra Pradesh. It is located in Pamidimukkala mandal of Vuyyuru revenue division.

== See also ==
- List of villages in Krishna district
