= Sardar Nagar =

Coordinates: 28°35′N 79°37′E

Sardarnagar
- Village
- Interactive map of Sardarnagar
- Country: India
- State: Telangana
- District: Ranga Reddy
- Metro: Rangareddy district

Government
  - Body: Mandal Office

Languages
  - Official: Telugu
- Time zone: UTC+5:30 (IST)
- Postal code: 509217
- Planning agency: Panchayat
- Civic agency: Mandal Office

Sardarnagar is a village and panchayat in Ranga Reddy district, Telangana, India. It falls under Shabad mandal.

Famous for Edla Angadi (a.k.a. Oxen market) and Angadi (weekly market).

This village has School, Temples, Bank and many more as common to other villages.

School:

ZPHS school located at the very entrance of the village.

Address:

Zilla Parishad High School (ZPHS), Sardarnagar, Kakloor-509217 Shabad (M) Ranga Reddy Telangana Borad: State Board Established: 1952

Medium: Telugu

Rural/Urban : Rural

Highest Class : 10

School Category : Higher Secondary

School Type : Co-ed

Edla Angadi:

This is oxen market. It happens every Tuesday of week. Farmers bring Oxen, Cows, Buffallows, also various other domestic animals like Goats, Donkeys, Horses for sale.

Angadi:

This is grains market. This too happens every Tuesday of week. Farmers from neighbouring villages bring their yields for sale in this market.
