= Meduru =

- Village
- Interactive map of Meduru
- Location in Andhra Pradesh, India Meduru (India)
- Coordinates: 16.2762°N 80.8468°E
- Country: India
- State: Andhra Pradesh
- District: Krishna
- Mandal: Pamidimukkala

Government
  - Type: Gram Panchayat
  - Body: Meduru Gram Panchayat

Area
  - Total: 13.2 km^{2} (5.1 sq mi)
- Elevation: 9 m (30 ft)

Population (2011)
  - Total: 4,357
  - Density: 330/km^{2} (855/sq mi)

Languages
  - Official: Telugu
- Time zone: UTC+5:30 (IST)
- PIN: 521 247
- Telephone code: +91-08676
- Vehicle registration: AP 16

Meduru is a village in Krishna district of the Indian state of Andhra Pradesh. It is located in Pamidimukkala mandal of Vuyyuru revenue division.

An inscription states that in 1516 a battle took place between Srikrishna Devaraya and some enemy whose name is obliterated, in which Srikrishna Devaraya was victorious. Source - A forgotten empire by Robert Sewell
