= Kasaraneni Vari Palem =

- village
- Interactive map of Kasaraneni Vari Palem
- Country: India
- State: Andhra Pradesh
- District: Krishna

Languages
  - Official: Telugu
- Time zone: UTC+5:30 (IST)

Kasaraneni Vari Palem is a village in Krishna district of Andhra Pradesh, India. It is located near Vijayawada, on the banks of the Krishna River. The village is part of Kankipadu mandal, and is located within the Penamaluru (Assembly constituency) and the Machilipatnam (Lok Sabha constituency).
