= Komarraju =

Komarraju is one of the Indian surnames:

- Komarraju Venkatappaiah, father of K. V. Lakshmana Rao (below), minister and poet.
- Komarraju Venkata Lakshmana Rao, (18 May 1877 – 14 July 1923) was an Indian historian.
- Komarraju Atchamamba (6 September 1906 – 20 October 1964), an Indian lawyer, obstetrician, gynecologist, politician and a former Member of Parliament.
