= Pedalanka, Kollur mandal =

Pedalanka
- Village
- Interactive map of Pedalanka
- Location in Andhra Pradesh, India
- Coordinates: 16.1991317°N 80.7845282°E
- Country: India
- State: Andhra Pradesh
- District: Bapatla
- Mandal: Kollur

Government
  - Type: Panchayati raj
  - Body: Pedalanka gram panchayat

Area
  - Total: 760 ha (1,900 acres)

Population (2011)
  - Total: 4,246
  - Density: 560/km^{2} (1,400/sq mi)

Languages
  - Official: Telugu
- Time zone: UTC+5:30 (IST)
- Area code: +91–
- Vehicle registration: AP

Pedalanka is a village in Bapatla district of the state Indian state of Andhra Pradesh. It is located Kollur mandal of Tenali revenue division.

== Geography ==
Pedalanka is situated near the banks of Krishna River and to the northeast of the mandal headquarters, Kolluru, at 16.1991317°N 80.7845282°E. It is spread over an area of 760 ha (1,900 acres).

== Government and politics ==
Pedalanka gram panchayat is the local self-government of the village. It is divided into wards and each ward is represented by a ward member. The village forms a part of Andhra Pradesh Capital Region and is under the jurisdiction of APCRDA.

== Education ==
As per the school information report for the academic year 2018–19, the village has a total of four MPP schools.
