= Chinapulivarru =

- Village
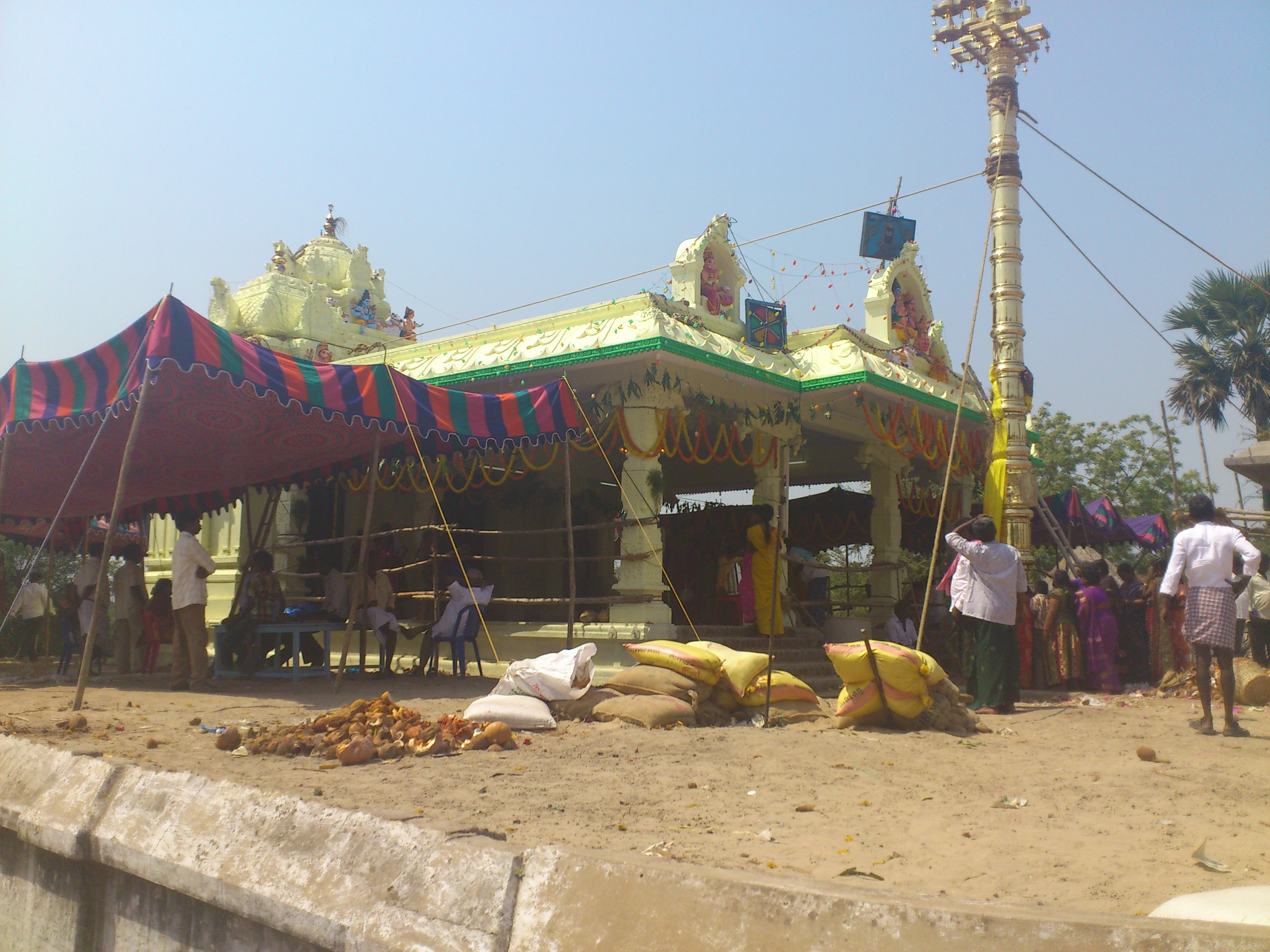
- Sivalayam, Chinapulivarru
- Interactive map of Chinapulivarru
- Location in Andhra Pradesh, India
- Coordinates: 16.128°N 80.797°E
- Country: India
- State: Andhra Pradesh
- District: Bapatla
- Mandal: Kollur

Government
  - Type: Panchayati raj
  - Body: Chinapulivarru gram panchayat

Area
  - Total: 494 ha (1,220 acres)

Population (2011)
  - Total: 1,881
  - Density: 381/km^{2} (986/sq mi)

Languages
  - Official: Telugu
- Time zone: UTC+5:30 (IST)
- PIN: 522257
- Area code: +91–8644
- Vehicle registration: AP

Chinapulivarru is a village in Bapatla district of the Indian state of Andhra Pradesh. It is located in Kollur mandal of Tenali revenue division.

== Geography ==
Chinapulivarru is situated to the south of the mandal headquarters, Kolluru, at 16.128°N 80.797°E. It is spread over an area of 494 ha (1,220 acres).

=== Climate ===
Chinapulivarru has a temperate Tropical wet-dry, similar to much of Vijayawada. Monsoon season starts from second week June and rains continues till October. Despite its reputation being rainy water inundated village, Chinapulivarru has constantly does flood water management with associated state government schemes from 5 decades. Winter season starts from Deepavali around mid-November to mid-February. Summers are generally hot and suffocating due to high humidity levels in the air being the coastal to the Bay of Bengal sea. Chinapulivarru average later May temperate are highest for the season resulting sun strokes for few who expose to it. There were two natural calamities from cyclones devastating Chinapulivarru on 19 November 1977 and 5 May 1990. However the month November is having the history is Cyclones and major storms prone.

Climate data for Chinapulivarru
Month	Jan	Feb	Mar	Apr	May	Jun	Jul	Aug	Sep	Oct	Nov	Dec	Year
Record high °C (°F)	32.4 (90.3)	34.6 (94.3)	38.1 (100.6)	41.8 (107.2)	46.5 (115.7)	45.4 (113.7)	40.8 (105.4)	38.6 (101.5)	36.8 (98.2)	37.2 (99.0)	33.3 (91.9)	33.0 (91.4)	46.5 (115.7)
Mean daily maximum °C (°F)	28.5 (83.3)	30.2 (86.4)	32.5 (90.5)	34.6 (94.3)	37.3 (99.1)	36.7 (98.1)	33.7 (92.7)	32.6 (90.7)	32.5 (90.5)	31.6 (88.9)	30.1 (86.2)	28.8 (83.8)	32.4 (90.4)
Daily mean °C (°F)	23.8 (74.8)	25.5 (77.9)	27.5 (81.5)	30.2 (86.4)	32.4 (90.3)	32.4 (90.3)	29.7 (85.5)	29.0 (84.2)	28.9 (84.0)	27.8 (82.0)	25.8 (78.4)	24.3 (75.7)	28.1 (82.6)
Mean daily minimum °C (°F)	19.0 (66.2)	20.8 (69.4)	22.6 (72.7)	25.7 (78.3)	27.5 (81.5)	27.0 (80.6)	25.6 (78.1)	25.4 (77.7)	25.3 (77.5)	24.0 (75.2)	21.6 (70.9)	19.9 (67.8)	23.7 (74.7)
Record low °C (°F)	14.0 (57.2)	15.6 (60.1)	17.3 (63.1)	17.8 (64.0)	17.6 (63.7)	21.0 (69.8)	18.8 (65.8)	18.8 (65.8)	18.1 (64.6)	17.8 (64.0)	15.3 (59.5)	14.6 (58.3)	14.0 (57.2)
Average precipitation mm (inches)	6 (0.2)	9 (0.4)	7 (0.3)	9 (0.4)	20 (0.8)	86 (3.4)	171 (6.7)	181 (7.1)	156 (6.1)	177 (7.0)	116 (4.6)	21 (0.8)	959 (37.8)
Average rainy days	0.5	0.6	0.5	0.8	2.2	7.7	13.8	12.6	10.4	9.2	5.6	1.2	65.1
Average relative humidity (%)	76	75	73	73	66	62	72	74	78	79	75	75	73
Source: NOAA (1971–1990)

== Demographics ==
As of 2011 census, Chinapulivarru had a population of 1,881. The total population constitute, 927 males and 954 females —a sex ratio of 1029 females per 1000 males. 129 children are in the age group of 0–6 years, of which 64 are boys and 65 are girls —a ratio of 1016 per 1000. The average literacy rate stands at 67.58% with 1,184 literates, approximately equal to the state average of 67.41%.

== Governance ==
Chinapulivarru gram panchayat is the local self-government of the village. It is divided into wards and each ward is represented by a ward member. The village forms a part of Andhra Pradesh Capital Region and is under the jurisdiction of APCRDA.

== Economy ==
Agriculture

The major occupation of the village is agriculture and the crops cultivated include, paddy.

== Education ==
As per the school information report for the academic year 2018–19, the village has 2 Mandal Parishad schools.

== See also ==
- List of villages in Bapatla district
