= Pedalanka =

Pedalanka may refer to:

- Pedalanka, Bhattiprolu mandal, an Indian village in Bhattiprolu mandal
- Pedalanka, Kollur mandal, an Indian village in Kollur mandal
