= Sivarampuram =

Sivarampuram Lanka
- Village
- Interactive map of Sivarampuram
- Location in Andhra Pradesh, India Sivarampuram (India)
- Coordinates: 16.1243554°N 80.8515433°E
- Country: India
- State: Andhra Pradesh
- District: Bapatla
- Mandal: Kollur

Languages
  - Official: Telugu
- Time zone: UTC+5:30 (IST)
- Vehicle registration: AP

Sivarampuram is a village in Bapatla district of the Indian state of Andhra Pradesh. It is located in Kollur mandal.
