= Anjaiah =

Anjaiah or Anjayya is an Indian given name. Notable people with the name include:

- Anne Anjaiah (1905–1975), Indian freedom fighter
- Guda Anjaiah (1955–2016), Indian poet, singer, lyricist, and writer
- T. Anjaiah (1919–1986), Indian politician
  - T. Anjaiah Lumbini Park, located in Hyderabad
