= Choragudi =

- Village
- Interactive map of Choragudi
- Location within Andhra Pradesh
- Coordinates: 16.244°N 80.874°E
- Country: India
- State: Andhra Pradesh
- District: Krishna
- Mandal: Pamidimukkala

Area
  - Total: 7.28 km^{2} (2.81 sq mi)

Population (2011)
  - Total: 5,303

Languages
  - Official: Telugu
- Time zone: UTC+5:30 (IST)
- PIN: 521250

Choragudi is a village Krishna District of the Indian state of Andhra Pradesh. It is under Pamidimukkala mandal of Nuzvid revenue division.

== See also ==
- Alinakhi Palem
