= Shabad, Telangana =

Shabad
- Town
- Location in Telangana, India Shabad (India)
- Coordinates: 17.160091°N 78.133122°E
- Country: India
- State: Telangana
- District: Rangareddy
- Talukas: Shabad
- Elevation: 650 m (2,130 ft)

Population (01-01-2011)
  - Total: 25,000

Languages
  - Official: Telugu
- Time zone: UTC+5:30 (IST)
- PIN: 509217
- Telephone code: 08417
- Vehicle registration: TG
- Website: telangana.gov.in

Shabad is a town and a mandal in Ranga Reddy district in the state of Telangana in India. Its name is sometimes written as Shahabad. It is situated about 45 km from Hyderabad, the state capital. This town is well connected with roads, a state highway runs through Shabad, which connects Shabad with Hyderabad, and nearby Chevella, Shamshabad and Shadnagar towns.

== Geography ==
It has a similar climate as that of Hyderabad, but now the place is cooler compared to Hyderabad. As the town is surrounded by water bodies and forests, it has a cooler climate. In summer the temperature rises to about 31 degrees C, and in winter it falls to about 15 degrees C, and even some times less than 8 degrees C.

== Panchayats ==
The following is the list of village panchayats in Shabad mandal.

- Bobbilgam
- Tirumalapur
- Elgondaguda
- Etlaerravaly
- Tadlapalle
- Rudraram
- Chandenvalle
- Hayathabad
- Solipet
- Maddur
- Peddaved
- Dammerlapalle
- Nagarkunta
- Bhongirpalle
- Machanpalle
- Polaram
- Pothugal
- Regadidoswada
- Komerabanda
- Obagunta
- Shabad
- Manmarri
- Kakloor
- Ananthawaram
- Kesaguda
- Rangapur
- Kummariguda
- Muddem guda

== Prominent Schools ==
- Dhyanahita High School
- Government High School
- Government Primary Schools
- Government ZPHS High School Girls
- Government Urdu Medium School
- Holy Spirit High School
- Navajeevan High School
- Sri Saraswathi Shishu Mandir
- Sumedha Montessori E/m High School
- Telangana State Model High School

== Colleges ==
- PRRM College of Engineering and Technology
- PRRM Pharmacy College
- PRRM College of Pharmacy
- TSMS Junior College

== Places of interest ==
The town contains many temples, mosques, and churches. There are about four mosques in Shabad along with a landmark mosque called ID GAH Shabad, which is believed to have been built by Mughal emperor Aurangzeb. There is the dargah of Hazrath Pahelwaan Shah Wali situated adjacent to the Shahabad tank. A famous Lord Sri Krishna temple is in Nagarkunta village. This village is 5 km from Shabad. Near Muddem Guda there is a Lord Shiva temple and some associated monuments. In shabad near yelgondaguda there is Meerapur dargah it is a famous dargah everyday a lot of people come to dargah. There are four churches Aroygyapuri Roman Catholic Church and Mennonite Brothers Church both are located in S.C colony(Harijanwada)the other two churches are in Shabad behind the cooperative bank. The Katta Maisamma temple on the way to Keshavguda, Golluriguda is a famous temple. The lake road is used for relaxing and has a good sunset sight.

== Languages ==
The major languages spoken in Shabad are Telugu and Urdu. English and Hindi are occasionally used.

== Crops ==
The place is much suitable for harvesting tomatoes (2-3 truckloads of tomatoes are transported to Hyderabad every day). In addition, farmers grow other crops including many flowers and vegetables, as well as rice, jowar, cotton, and corn.
