= Ravikampadu =

- Village
- Interactive map of Ravikampadu
- Location in Andhra Pradesh, India Ravikampadu (India)
- Coordinates: 16.163838°N 80.765022°E
- Country: India
- State: Andhra Pradesh

Area
  - Total: 14.90 km^{2} (5.75 sq mi)
- Elevation: 10 m (33 ft)

Population (2011)
  - Total: 4,462
  - Density: 299.5/km^{2} (775.6/sq mi)

Languages
  - Official: Telugu
- Time zone: UTC+5:30 (IST)
- Postal code: 522324
- Vehicle registration: AP-39

Ravikampadu is a small village in the Kollur mandal of the Bapatla district of Andhra Pradesh, India.

== Geography ==
Ravikampadu is situated at 16.163838N 80.765022 E. The Village is spread over an area of 1490 hectares. It lies at an average altitude of 10 metres (33 ft) above mean sea level.

== Demographics ==
As of 2011 census, the village had a population of 4462. The average literacy rate stands at 64.4 %

== Government and politics ==
Ravikampadu gram panchayat is the local self-government of the village. It is divided into wards, and each ward is represented by a ward member. The village forms a part of Andhra Pradesh Capital Region and is under the jurisdiction of APCRDA.

The Village is represented by Vemuru Assembly constituency in the state legislative assembly. The assembly segment forms a part of Bapatla Lok Sabha constituencywhich represents the lower house of Indian Parliament. The present MLA from Vemuru is Mr. Nakka Ananda Babu

== Education ==
The primary and secondary school education is imparted by government, aided and private schools, under the School Education Department of the state. The total number of students enrolled in primary and upper primary schools of the village are 178.

Zilla Parishad High School is the government run school in the village.

== Transport ==
Ravikampadu is a small rural village with limited direct transportation facilities. Access to the village primarily depends on nearby towns, especially Vemuru and Kollur, from where regular transport services are available.

Rail: The nearest railway station is Vemuru Railway Station (VMU), located on the Tenali–Repalle branch line of the Guntur–Repalle section. The station falls under the Guntur railway division of South-Central Railway. From Vemuru, local transport is used to reach Ravikampadu.

Road: Ravikampadu is connected to nearby villages and towns through village roads. Regular APSRTC bus services are limited and mainly operate on the Tenali–Kollur route, passing through Vemuru. Residents generally travel to Vemuru or Kollur Road to access frequent bus services and other transport facilities.

Air: The nearest airport is Vijayawada International Airport (Gannavaram), approximately 75 km away. It provides domestic and limited international connectivity. Travelers typically reach the airport via road transport from Vemuru, Kollur and Tenali.

== Eminent personalities ==
- Gummadi Venkateswara Rao (1927–2010), popularly known as Gummadi, was a renowned Telugu film and theatre actor born in this village. He was widely respected for his natural acting style and memorable portrayals of fatherly, ethical, and character-driven roles, and is regarded as one of the finest supporting actors in the history of Telugu cinema.
