= Obagunta =

- Village
- Country: India
- State: Andhra Pradesh
- District: Ranga Reddy
- Metro: Ranga Reddy district

Government
  - Body: Mandal Office

Languages
  - Official: Telugu
- Time zone: UTC+5:30 (IST)
- Planning agency: Panchayat
- Civic agency: Mandal Office

Obagunta is a village and panchayat in Ranga Reddy district, AP, India. It falls under Shabad mandal. According to the 2011 census, the area has a population of 358 individuals residing in 92 households. The primary agricultural product in this region is cotton cultivation.
