= Ubaya Rameswara Kshetram =

Coordinates: 16°13′53″N 80°47′15″E

Ubaya Rameswara Kshetram is a Hindu temple dedicated to the deities Shiva and Parvati, located in Chilumuru, Bapatla district, in the Indian state of Andhra Pradesh.

The temple is renowned for its primary deity, Shiva, who is worshipped as Rameswara and represented by a Saikata Lingam (a Lingam formed from sand). According to Sthala Puranam, this is one of the rare Lingams in existence established by Sita Devi.

The temple complex is situated on the banks of the Krishna River. Its location on the riverbank makes it a significant site for ritual baths and spiritual gatherings, particularly during auspicious periods like Maha shivaratri and Karthika Masam.

== Temple legend ==
- The temple is ancient, dating back to the Treta Yuga. According to the Skanda Purana, while returning from Lanka after killing Ravana, Lord Rama established Lingams along various places.
- When they reached the banks of the Krishna River and prepared to install a Siva Lingam, Rama dispatched Hanuman to fetch one from Kailasa. However, as the auspicious muhurtam (timing) approached and Hanuman had not yet returned, Sita Devi fashioned a Saikata Lingam (made of sand) and performed the Prana Pratishtha.
- Upon Hanuman’s return, he attempted to remove the sand Lingam to replace it with the one from Kailasa. Legend says the sand Lingam began to grow continuously; to stop this, Sita Devi placed a knot of sand on top of it, which halted its growth. Lord Rama then established the Lingam brought by Hanuman on the opposite bank of the Krishna River in the village of Iluru.
- Together, these two sites are known as Ubaya Rameswara Kshetram.

== History ==
- In the 12th century, during the Chola dynasty, kings noticed the Siva Lingam standing without a shelter and subsequently constructed the temple in 1153 AD. Inscriptions and carvings within the temple verify this historical timeline. The structure also features intricate carvings of Nataraja and the Sri Chakra.
