= Garikaparru =

- Village
- Interactive map of Garikaparru
- Location in Andhra Pradesh, India
- Coordinates: 16.345091°N 80.830859°E
- Country: India
- State: Andhra Pradesh
- Districts: Krishna

Government
  - Type: village panchayat

Area
  - Total: 3.01 km^{2} (1.16 sq mi)

Population (2011)
  - Total: 2,945
  - Density: 978/km^{2} (2,530/sq mi)

Languages
  - Official: Telugu
- Time zone: UTC+5:30 (IST)

Garikaparru is a village in Thotlavalluru mandal, located in Krishna district of Andhra Pradesh, India. The main occupation in the village is agriculture. Paddy and sugarcane are the most grown crops.

== How to reach Garikaparru ==
=== By road ===
Vijayawada is the nearest town to Garikaparru. Vijayawada is 32 km from Garikaparru. Road connectivity is there from Vijayawada to Garikaparru.

=== By rail ===
There is no railway station near to Garikaparru in less than 10 km. However you can reach Vijayawada by train and then you can reach from Vijayawada to Garikaparru by road after.

=== By bus ===
Vuyyuru APSRTC Bus Station, Manikonda APSRTC Bus Station, Kankipadu APSRTC Bus Station are the nearby by Bus Stations to Garikaparru.APSRTC runs Number of busses from major cities to here.

== Demographics of the village ==
According to the census of AP 2011 the village has 1950 literates and 995 illiterate population. Of the total population around 904 persons are agricultural labourers while 216 are cultivators. The population belonging to the SC/ST category is 1022 of the total 2945 making them a sizeable chunk.

The location code number of the village is 589521.While the area of the village is 301 hectares.

Garikaparru village has higher literacy rate compared to Andhra Pradesh. In 2011, literacy rate of Garikaparru village was 72.30% compared to 67.02% of Andhra Pradesh. In Garikaparru Male literacy stands at 76.57% while female literacy rate was 67.90%.
