= Bhongirpalle =

- Village
- Country: India
- State: Telangana
- District: Ranga Reddy
- Metro: Ranga Reddy district

Government
  - Body: Mandal Office

Languages
  - Official: Telugu
- Time zone: UTC+5:30 (IST)
- Vehicle registration: TS
- Planning agency: Panchayat
- Civic agency: Mandal Office
- Website: telangana.gov.in

Bhongirpalle is a village and panchayat in Ranga Reddy district in the Indian state of Telangana. It falls under the Shabad mandal. It is situated about 47 km from Hyderabad.

== Languages ==
The major languages spoken in Bhonagiripalle are Telugu and Urdu. English and Hindi are occasionally used.

== Crops ==
The place is suitable for growing tomatoes. Farmers grow other crops, including flowers and vegetables, as well as rice, jower, cotton and corn.
