= Mudunuru =

- Village
- Interactive map of Mudunuru
- Location in Andhra Pradesh, India
- Country: India
- State: Andhra Pradesh
- District: Krishna

Area
  - Total: 12.20 km^{2} (4.71 sq mi)

Population (2011)
  - Total: 3,859
  - Density: 316.3/km^{2} (819.2/sq mi)

Languages
  - Official: Telugu
- Time zone: UTC+5:30 (IST)
- PIN: 521261
- Lok Sabha constituency: MachiliPattanam
- Vidhan Sabha constituency: Penamaluru

Mudunuru is a village in Krishna district of the Indian state of Andhra Pradesh. It is located in Vuyyuru mandal of Nuzvid revenue division.

== Demographics ==
As of 2011 census, Mudunuru had a population of 3,859. The total population constitute, 1,903 males and 1,956 females —a sex ratio of 1028 females per 1000 males. 313 children are in the age group of 0–6 years, of which 174 are boys and 139 are girls. The average literacy rate stands at 72.67% with 2,577 literates, higher than the state average of 67.41%.

== Culture ==
The Indian Independence activist Anne Anjaiah (1905–1975) was born in this village.
