= Polaram, Ranga Reddy district =

Coordinates: 18°32′N 79°59′E

Polaram
- Village
- Interactive map of Polaram
- Country: India
- State: Telangana
- District: Ranga Reddy
- Metro: Ranga Reddy district

Government
  - Body: Mandal Office

Languages
  - Official: Telugu
- Time zone: UTC+5:30 (IST)
- Planning agency: Panchayat
- Civic agency: Mandal Office

Polaram (Village ID 574710) is a village and panchayat in Ranga Reddy district in the Indian state of Telangana. It falls under Shabad mandal. According to the 2011 census it has a population of 425 living in 91 households. Its main agriculture product is cotton growing.
