= Machanpalle =

- Village
- Country: India
- State: Telangana
- District: Ranga Reddy
- Metro: Ranga Reddy district

Government
  - Body: Panchayat office

Population (2019)
  - Total: 1,500

Languages
  - Official: Telugu
- Time zone: UTC+5:30 (IST)
- Postal code: 509217
- Planning agency: Panchayat
- Civic agency: Mandal Office

Machanpalle is a village and panchayat in Ranga Reddy district, Telangana, India. It falls under Shabad mandal.
