= Vuyyuru revenue division =

Revenue division in Andhra Pradesh, India

- revenue division in Krishna district
- Country: India
- State: Andhra Pradesh
- District: Krishna
- Formed: 4 April 2022
- Founder: Government of Andhra Pradesh
- Time zone: UTC+05:30 (IST)

Vuyyuru revenue division is an administrative division in the Krishna district of the Indian state of Andhra Pradesh. Formed on 4 April 2022 as part of a reorganisation of districts in the state, it is one of the 3 revenue divisions in the district with 7 mandals under its administration.

== Administration ==
Vuyyuru revenue division consists of 7 mandals which are

1. Kankipadu
2. Movva
3. Pamidimukkala
4. Penamaluru
5. Thotlavalluru
6. Pamarru
7. Vuyyuru
