= Yakamuru =

- Village
- Interactive map of Yakamuru
- Location in Andhra Pradesh, India Yakamuru (India)
- Coordinates: 16.3610°N 80.8295°E
- Country: India
- State: Andhra Pradesh
- District: Krishna

Area
  - Total: 2.55 km^{2} (0.98 sq mi)

Population (2011)
  - Total: 2,447
  - Density: 960/km^{2} (2,490/sq mi)

Languages
  - Official: Telugu
- Time zone: UTC+5:30 (IST)
- Vehicle registration: AP 16
- Lok Sabha constituency: Machilipatnam
- Vidhan Sabha constituency: Pamarru

Yakamuru is a village in Thotlavalluru mandal Krishna district of the Indian state of Andhra Pradesh.

== See also ==
- Villages in Thotlavalluru mandal
