= Hayathabad =

Hayathabad హయతాబాద్ (హైతాబాద్)
- Village & Gram Panchayat
- PO: Hythabad
- Map showing Hayathabad in Telangana, India
- Coordinates: 17.2248915°N 78.2000935°E
- Country: India
- State: Telangana
- District: Ranga Reddy
- Revenue Division: Chevella
- Mandal: Shabad
- No. of GP Wards: 10

Population
  - Total: above 2,000

Languages
  - Official: Telugu
- Time zone: UTC+5:30 (IST)
- PIN: 509217
- Vehicle registration: TG07
- MLA Constituency: Chevella
- MP Constituency: Chevella

Hayathabad is a Village and Gram Panchayat in Ranga Reddy district, Telangana, India. It falls under Shabad mandal. A double line road connecting Shamshabad ORR and Shabad passes through it.

The distance from Hayathabad to surrounding popular places are in the following range: Shabad (11 km), Chevella (18 km), Shamshabad (23 Km), Shadnagar (23 km), Moinabad (23 km), Nehru Outer Ring Road Exit No. 16 (24 Km), Rajiv Gandhi International Airport (33 Km), Timmapur Railway Station (16 Km) & Kanha Shanti Vanam (7 Km).

A Industrial Park (Chandanvelly IP) proposed in these region through TGIIC which has given rise to direct and indirect employment opportunities in these region.

The nearby popular places are: 1. Amazon Data Center (AWS) 2. Microsoft Data Center 3. Welspun group of Industries 4. Katerra Ind Pvt. Ltd. 5. Daifuku Intra logistics Ind Pvt. Ltd. 6. Zilla Parishad High School, Hayathabad 7. Sri Ramadhutha swamy ashramam 8. Dargah (Astana-E-Shah-Gulshan) 9. TG Transco office

== Places under Hayathabad Gram Panchayat ==
Ankuguda

Hayathabad Thanda

Hayathabad village

== Neighbouring Villages/Gram Panchayats ==
1.Chandanvelly 2.Nakkalpalle 3.Solipet 4.Maddur 5.Peddaved
