= Regadidoswada =

- Village
- Country: India
- State: Andhra Pradesh
- District: Ranga Reddy
- Metro: Ranga Reddy district

Government
  - Body: Mandal Office

Languages
  - Official: Telugu
- Time zone: UTC+5:30 (IST)
- PIN: 501501
- Lok Sabha constituency: Chevella
- Vidhan Sabha constituency: Chevella
- Planning agency: Panchayat
- Civic agency: Mandal Office

Regadi Doswada (Village ID 574712) is a village and panchayat in Ranga Reddy district, AP, India. It falls under Shabad Mandal. According to the 2011 census it has a population of 1892 living in 432 households. Its main agricultural products are cotton and vegetables growing.
