= Chalivendrapalem =

ChalivendraPalem
- Village
- Nickname: Palem
- Interactive map of ChalivendraPalem
- Location in Andhra Pradesh, India
- Coordinates: 16.577°N 81.273°E
- Country: India
- State: Andhra Pradesh
- Districts: Krishna

Population (2011)
  - Total: 1,043

Languages
  - Official: Telugu
- Time zone: UTC+5:30 (IST)

Chalivendrapalem is a village in Kankipadu mandal, located in the Krishna district of the Indian state of Andhra Pradesh.
