= Kuderu, Krishna district =

Kuderu
- Village
- Location in Andhra Pradesh, India Kuderu (India)
- Coordinates: 16.25°N 80.84°E
- Country: India
- State: Andhra Pradesh
- District: Krishna
- Mandal: Pamidimukkala

Government
  - Type: Gram Panchayat
  - Body: Kuderu Gram Panchayat

Area
  - Total: 5.39 km^{2} (2.08 sq mi)
- Elevation: 9 m (30 ft)

Population (2011)
  - Total: 1,679
  - Density: 312/km^{2} (807/sq mi)

Languages
  - Official: Telugu
- Time zone: UTC+5:30 (IST)
- PIN: 521 247
- Telephone code: +91-08676
- Vehicle registration: AP 16
- Lok Sabha constituency: Machilipatnam
- Vidhan Sabha constituency: Pamarru

Kuderu is a village in Krishna district of the Indian state of Andhra Pradesh. It is located in Pamidimukkala mandal of Nuzvid revenue division.
