= Vuyyuru =

- Town
- Location in Andhra Pradesh, India
- Coordinates: 16°22′0″N 80°51′0″E
- Country: India
- State: Andhra Pradesh
- District: Krishna
- Mandal: Vuyyuru

Government
  - Type: Municipality
  - Commissioner: K Siva Rami Reddy

Area
  - Total: 16.84 km^{2} (6.50 sq mi)
- Elevation: 16 m (52 ft)

Population (2011)
  - Total: 46,490
  - Density: 2,761/km^{2} (7,150/sq mi)

Languages
  - Official: Telugu
- Time zone: UTC+5:30 (IST)
- PIN: 521 165
- Telephone code: +91–08676
- Vehicle registration: AP 16
- Lok Sabha constituency: Machilipatnam
- Vidhan Sabha constituency: Penamaluru
- Website: vuyyuru.cdma.ap.gov.in/en/municipality-profile

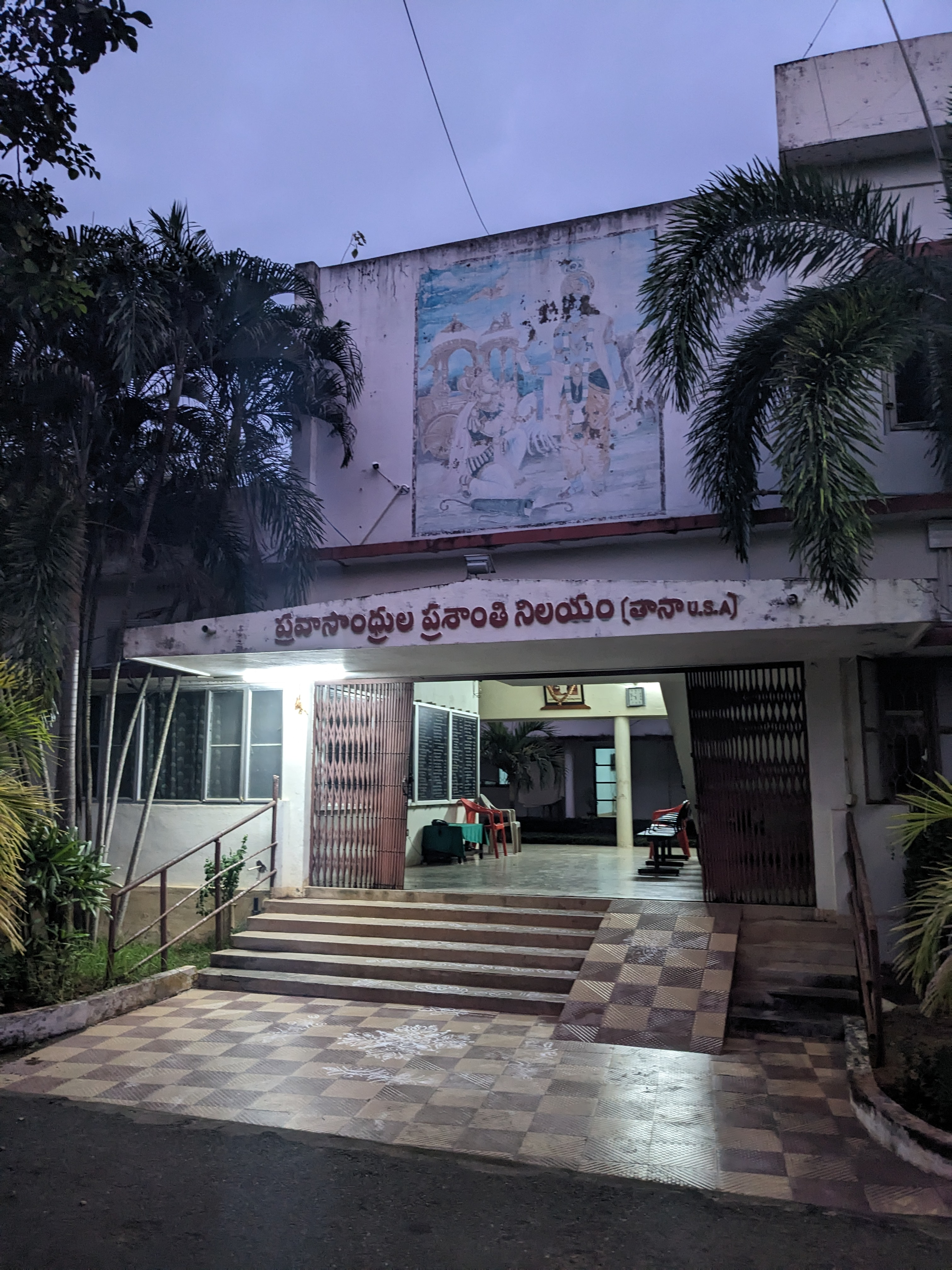
An old age home in Vuyyuru

Vuyyuru is a town in Krishna district of the Indian state of Andhra Pradesh. It is a Nagar panchayat and the headquarters of Vuyyuru Mandal. It is emerging as a neighbourhood of Vijayawada, India situated 30 km away.

== History ==
It was part of Satavahana dynasty during the 1st century CE. In 1000 A.D. the Cholas spread their power to Kolleru area and during that period some of them settled at this place. After that it eventually became part of Kakatiya dynasty. By the 14th Century the village grew in size and population, came under the rule of the Zamindaars of Nuzivid.

== Demographics ==
As of 2011 Census of India, the town had a population of 46,490. The total population constitutes 23,312 males and 23,178 females —a sex ratio of 994 females per 1,000 males, higher than the national average of 940 per 1,000. 4,332 children are in the age group of 0–6 years, of which 2,151 are boys and 2,181 are girls. The town's average literacy rate stands at 81.87% with 34,513 literates, significantly higher than the national average of 73.00%. It is 40 km away from state capital Amaravati. Vuyyuru town generally has a tropical climate; winters last from November to February, while summers last from March to June. The annual rainfall is 92.33 mm, most of it received during the months of August.

== Economy ==
Agriculture

Vuyyuru's economy is based on agriculture, mainly rice and sugar cane. The land is very fertile, and irrigation canals which draw water from the Krishna River crisscross the area. The main canal in the town is Pulleru Canal. A small dam and bridge were constructed during the British period on the canal in the town in 1890. This bridge served the locals for more than a century. Until 1988 small boats used to ply in some regions to transport people across. As of now, there are 6 bridges and 1 footbridge on this canal in Vuyyuru.

Industries

K.C.P Sugar and Industries Corporation Ltd. is the first sugar manufacturing unit set up at Vuyyuru in 1941 and is one of the leading sugar manufacturing companies in India. The company has two sugar factories located in Krishna District Andhra Pradesh having an aggregate crushing capacity of 11,500 tons per day. Its allied business consists of manufacturing and marketing of Rectified Spirit, Extra Neutral Alcohol, Ethanol, Organic Manure, Mycorrhiza Vam, Calcium Lactate and CO_{2}. KCP has a cogeneration plant which produces 15 MW of power.

== Governance ==
Civic administration

Vuyyuru Municipality is the civic administrative body of the town which was constituted in the year 2011. Its revenue division consists of 7 mandals which are Vuyyuru, Pamidimukkala, Kankipadu, Penamaluru, Thotlavalluru, Movva and Ghantasala.

It is spread over an area of 16.84 km^{2} (6.50 mi^{2}). It is part of Andhra Pradesh Capital Region and represents East Zone (Vuyyuru Zone) divided by Andhra Pradesh Capital Region Development Authority

Law and Order

Vuyyuru falls under Vijayawada Police Commissionerate and has two police stations, town and rural. The police supremo is Circle Inspector followed by Sub-Inspector functioning in the town and villages of Mandal.

Politics

Previously, Vuyyuru was an assembly constituency. But after the 2009 reorganization, it falls under Penamaluru (Assembly constituency), which in turn represents Machilipatnam (Lok Sabha constituency) of Andhra Pradesh. The present MLA representing Penamaluru (Assembly constituency) is Kolusu Parthasarathy and MP representing Machilipatnam (Lok Sabha constituency) is Vallabhaneni Balasouri both belonging to YSR Congress Party.

== Healthcare ==
The Government General Hospital is located in Katuru Road. There are two charity-funded hospitals. The Bethel Hospital was founded in 1906. The Rotary Eye Hospital is funded by KCP sugar factory and local residents. There are several private hospitals with facilities varying from basic amenities to surgery facilities. Right now, Vuyyuru is the medical centre for the neighbouring villages.

== Transport ==
Roadways

It is located on the National Highway 65. A four-lane road from Vijayawada to Machilipatnam passes through Vuyyuru. APSRTC operates buses from Vuyyuru bus station which also has a bus depot. The government-owned bus stand and bus depot were constructed in 1987. The then chief minister of the state N. T. Rama Rao laid the foundation stone for the project. The town has a total road length of 64.14 km (39.85 mi). A bypass road was constructed in 1987 to divert traffic from main roads. This bypass connects Machilipatnam with Vijayawada, Hyderabad, and Pune. All heavy vehicles travel over this road to ease traffic through town. It has now been developed and transformed into a four-lane road and which is maintained by NHAI as the Machilipatnam-Pune Highway.

The most common bus travelling between Vijayawada and Vuyyuru is the no. 222. The no. 333 bus serves Vijayawada railway station to Pammaru via Vuyyuru, return.

Railways

There is no railway station in Vuyyuru. The nearby railway stations are Gudivada Junction railway station (22.9 km) and Vijayawada Junction railway station (31.4 km).

Airways

The nearest airport is Vijayawada Airport which is at a distance of 24.5 km.

== Education ==
Vuyyuru is a center for Primary and Secondary School Education for people in surrounding villages. List of schools in Vuyyuru includes Zilla Parishat High School, VRKM High School, Sri Viswasanthi Educational Institutions, Sri Chaitanya High School, Sri Srinivasa Educational institutions (KG to PG), Flora EM High School, Ravindra Bharathi School. In terms of Intermediate colleges, there were Nayarayana, Chaitanya, Krishnaveni & Sri Chaitanya Junior College in Katuru road. Vuyyuru has many colleges for higher education including A.G & S.G Siddhartha Degree College of Arts and Science which was inaugurated on 12 August 1975 by then Chief Minister Sri Jalagam Vengala Rao. It is an accredited "A" grade by NAAC. The college has an indoor stadium and huge ground which serves for walkers and joggers in the town.

== Sugarcane Research ==
Sugarcane Research Station is located in Vuyyuru which was established in 1978 in an area of 40 acres with the mandate to develop sugarcane varieties possessing high cane and sugar yield potential. It is maintained by Indian Institute of Sugarcane Research and is affiliated to ANGRAU. It works on All India Coordinated Research Project on Sugarcane and has many achievements in sugarcane research.

== Culture ==
Vuyyuru is famous for Veeramma Thalli Thirunaallu which is conducted annually in February. It starts on the day of auspicious Bhishma Ekadasi. It was started in the 16th century during the Vijayanagara Empire. It has been continued and the tradition became a famous ritual for hundreds of villages and acts as traditional gathering and cultural cohesion. People from the town and surrounding villages celebrate this tradition in various forms like Sambaram, Jathara for 15 days.

== Religious Places ==
Temples

There are two temples under the management of Endowments Department. Sri Jagadambha Sametha Mallikarjuna Swamy Temple (Shivalayam) in the town is constructed during the 13th century by Kakatiya's. List of temples in the town:

1. Sri Jagadambha Sametha Mallikarjuna Swamy Temple (Shivalayam)
2. Sri Venugopala Swamy Temple
3. Sri Parupudi Veeramma Thalli Temple
4. Sri Abhaya Anjaneya Temple
5. Datta Digambara Kshetra
6. Kalyana Venkateswara Swami Temple
7. Sai Baba Temple

Mosque

A mosque which was constructed nearly 300 years ago is located on the main road of Vuyyuru. The mosque has been recently renovated.

Churches

There are many churches in Vuyyuru. CBM (Canadian Baptist Mission) church, which was constructed prior to independence, is the oldest church in the town.

== See also ==
- Vuyyuru Mandal
- Villages in Vuyyuru mandal
