= Krishnapuram, Krishna district =

Krishnapuram
- Village
- Interactive map of Krishnapuram
- Location in Andhra Pradesh, India
- Coordinates: 16.2557°N 80.8689°E
- Country: India
- State: Andhra Pradesh
- District: Krishna
- Mandal: Pamidimukkala

Government
  - Type: Gram Panchayat
  - Body: Krishnapuram Gram Panchayat
- Elevation: 9 m (30 ft)

Population (2011)
  - Total: 3,693

Languages
  - Official: Telugu
- Time zone: UTC+5:30 (IST)
- PIN: 521 250
- Telephone code: +91-08676
- Vehicle registration: AP 16
- Lok Sabha constituency: Machilipatnam
- Vidhan Sabha constituency: Pamarru

Krishnapuram is a village in Krishna district of the Indian state of Andhra Pradesh. It is located in Pamidimukkala mandal of Nuzvid revenue division.
