= Kandalampadu =

- Village
- Interactive map of Kandalampadu
- Location in Andhra Pradesh, India Kandalampadu (India)
- Coordinates: 16°25′40″N 80°50′09″E
- Country: India
- State: Andhra Pradesh
- District: Krishna

Area
  - Total: 1.03 km^{2} (0.40 sq mi)

Population (2011)
  - Total: 296
  - Density: 287/km^{2} (744/sq mi)

Languages
  - Official: Telugu
- Time zone: UTC+5:30 (IST)
- Vehicle registration: AP–16

Kandalampadu is a village in Krishna District of the Indian state of Andhra Pradesh. It is located in Kankipadu mandal of Nuzvid revenue division.
