= Kalavapamula =

Village in Andhra Pradesh, India

- Village
- Interactive map of Kalavapamula
- Location in Andhra Pradesh, India Kalavapamula (India)
- Coordinates: 16.26°N 80.52°E
- Country: India
- State: Andhra Pradesh
- District: Krishna

Area
  - Total: 7.84 km^{2} (3.03 sq mi)

Population (2011)
  - Total: 3,646

Languages
  - Official: Telugu
- Time zone: UTC+5:30 (IST)
- PIN: 521166
- Telephone code: 91–8676
- Vehicle registration: AP–16

Kalavapamula is a village in Krishna district of the Indian state of Andhra Pradesh. It is located in Vuyyuru mandal of Nuzvid revenue division.
