= Rudraram =

Rudraram Rudrawaram
- Village
- Location in Telangana state, India
- Coordinates: 17.563°N 78.167°E
- Country: India
- State: Telangana
- District: Sangareddy
- Metro: Sangareddy district

Government
  - Body: Mandal Office

Population
  - Total: 6,000

Official
  - Languages: Telugu
- Time zone: UTC+5:30 (IST)
- Postal code: 502329
- Vehicle registration: TS 15
- Planning agency: Panchayat
- Civic agency: Mandal Office
- Website: telangana.gov.in

Rudraram is a village and panchayat in Sangareddy district, TS, India. It falls under Patancheru mandal.
