= Tadlapalle =

- Village
- Country: India
- State: Andhra Pradesh
- District: Ranga Reddy
- Metro: Ranga Reddy district

Government
  - Body: Mandal Office

Languages
  - Official: Telugu
- Time zone: UTC+5:30 (IST)
- Planning agency: Panchayat
- Civic agency: Mandal Office

Tadlapalle (Village ID 574699) is a village and panchayat in Ranga Reddy district, Andhra Pradesh, India. It falls under Shabad mandal. According to the 2011 census it has a population of 3946 living in 911 households. Its main agriculture product are rice and cotton growing.
