= Kummariguda, Shabad =

Kummariguda lingalaguda
- Village
- Country: India
- State: Telangana
- District: Ranga Reddy
- Metro: Ranga Reddy district

Government
  - Body: Mandal Office

Languages
  - Official: Telugu
- Time zone: UTC+5:30 (IST)
- Planning agency: Panchayat
- Civic agency: Mandal Office

Kummariguda is a village and panchayat in Ranga Reddy district, Telangana, India. It falls under Shabad mandal. This village was one of the biggest Panchayat in the Shabad Mandal before it made into two Panchayats by carving out Naredlaguda out of Kummariguda as a new Panchayat. Kummariguda is the one of biggest milk production village in Telangana.
