= Royyuru =

Coordinates: 16°21′18″N 80°46′27″E

- village
- Interactive map of Royyuru
- Country: India
- State: Andhra Pradesh
- District: Krishna
- Named for: Paddy and Sugarcane Fields

Government
  - Body: Panchayat

Area
  - Total: 12.52 km^{2} (4.83 sq mi)

Population (2011)
  - Total: 2,383
  - Density: 190.3/km^{2} (493.0/sq mi)

Languages
  - Official: Telugu
- Time zone: UTC+5:30 (IST)
- Postal code: 521151
- Telephone code: +91-866-XXX XXXX

Royyuru is a village in Krishna District, Thotlavalluru mandal, Andhra Pradesh, India.
