= Kakloor =

- Village
- Country: India
- State: Andhra Pradesh
- District: Ranga Reddy
- Metro: Ranga Reddy district

Government
  - Body: Mandal Office

Languages
  - Official: Telugu
- Time zone: UTC+5:30 (IST)
- Planning agency: Panchayat
- Civic agency: Mandal Office

Kakloor (Village ID 574717) is a village and panchayat in Ranga Reddy district, AP, India. It falls under Shabad mandal. According to the 2011 census it has a population of 4954 living in 1151 households. Its main agriculture product is maize growing.

Two villages are their under Kakloor village.
