= Chandanvelly =

Coordinates: 17.23272°N 78.17126°E

- Village
- Interactive map of Chandanvelly
- Country: India
- State: Telangana
- District: Ranga Reddy
- Metro: Ranga Reddy district

Government
  - Body: Mandal Office

Languages
  - Official: Telugu
- Time zone: UTC+5:30 (IST)
- Vehicle registration: TS
- Planning agency: Panchayat
- Civic agency: Mandal Office
- Website: telangana.gov.in

Chandanvelly is a village and panchayat in Ranga Reddy district, Telangana, India. It falls under Shabad mandal. Chandanvelly, adjoining Sitarampur, and Hayathabad near Hyderabad will become Telangana's largest industrial cluster in future. Microsoft has acquired 52 acres and CtrlS acquired 40 acres at Chandanvelly in Hyderabad to establish the data centres. Amazon is also planning to set up a data centre at Chandanvelly.

== Neighbouring Villages ==
1.Hayathabad 2.Gumdal 3.Narayandasguda 4.Rudraram
