= Solipet =

Coordinates: 17°16′N 79°31′E

- Village
- Interactive map of Solipet
- Country: India
- State: Telangana
- District: Ranga Reddy
- Metro: Ranga Reddy district

Government
  - Body: Mandal Office

Languages
  - Official: Telugu
- Time zone: UTC+5:30 (IST)
- Planning agency: Panchayat
- Civic agency: Mandal Office

Solipet (Village ID 574703) is a village and Panchayat in Ranga Reddy district, Telangana, India. It falls under Shabad mandal. According to the 2011 census it has a population of 1526 living in 376 households. Its main agriculture product is cotton cultivation.
