= Etlaerravaly =

- Village
- Country: India
- State: Telangana
- District: Ranga Reddy
- Metro: Ranga Reddy district

Government
  - Body: Mandal Office

Languages
  - Official: Telugu
- Time zone: UTC+5:30 (IST)
- PIN: 501503
- Vehicle registration: TS
- Vidhan Sabha constituency: Chevella
- Planning agency: Panchayat
- Civic agency: Mandal Office

Etlaerravaly is a village and panchayat in Ranga Reddy district, Telangana, India. It falls under Shabad mandal. Its name is also written as "Yetla Yerravalli vill".

== Languages ==
The major language spoken in Etlaerravally is Telugu. English and Hindi are occasionally used.

== Crops ==
The place is suitable for harvesting tomatoes. Farmers also grow other crops including many flowers and vegetables, as well as rice, jowar, cotton, and corn.

== Transport ==
This village has just the roadway and is 55 km from Hyderabad.
