= Thotlavalluru mandal =

- Mandal
- Interactive Map Outlining mandal
- Location in Andhra Pradesh, India
- Coordinates: 16°21′18″N 80°46′27″E
- Country: India
- State: Andhra Pradesh
- District: Krishna
- Headquarters: North Valluru

Population (2011)
  - Total: 38,641

Languages
  - Official: Telugu
- Time zone: UTC+5:30 (IST)
- Vehicle registration: AP 16
- Website: http://www.thotlavalluru.com/

Thotlavalluru mandal is one of the 25 mandals in Krishna district of the Indian state of Andhra Pradesh. It is under the administration of Vuyyuru revenue division and its headquarters are located at North Valluru. The mandal lies on the banks of Krishna River and is bounded by Kankipadu, Vuyyuru and Pamidimukkala mandals. The mandal is also a part of the Andhra Pradesh Capital Region under the jurisdiction of APCRDA.

== Towns and villages ==
As of 2011 census, the mandal has 16 villages.

The settlements in the mandal are listed below:

1. Boddapadu
2. Bhadrirajupalem
3. Chagantipadu
4. Chinapulipaka
5. Devarapalle
6. Garikaparru
7. Gurivindapalle
8. Iluru
9. Kanakavalli
10. Kummamuru
11. Madhurapuram
12. Mulakalapalle
13. North Valluru
14. Penamakuru
15. Royyuru
16. South Valluru
17. Yakamuru
18. Pamulapati Vari Palem

== See also ==
- Villages in Thotlavalluru mandal
