= Nuzvid Estate =

Indian administrative division

Nuzvid
- Zamindari Estate
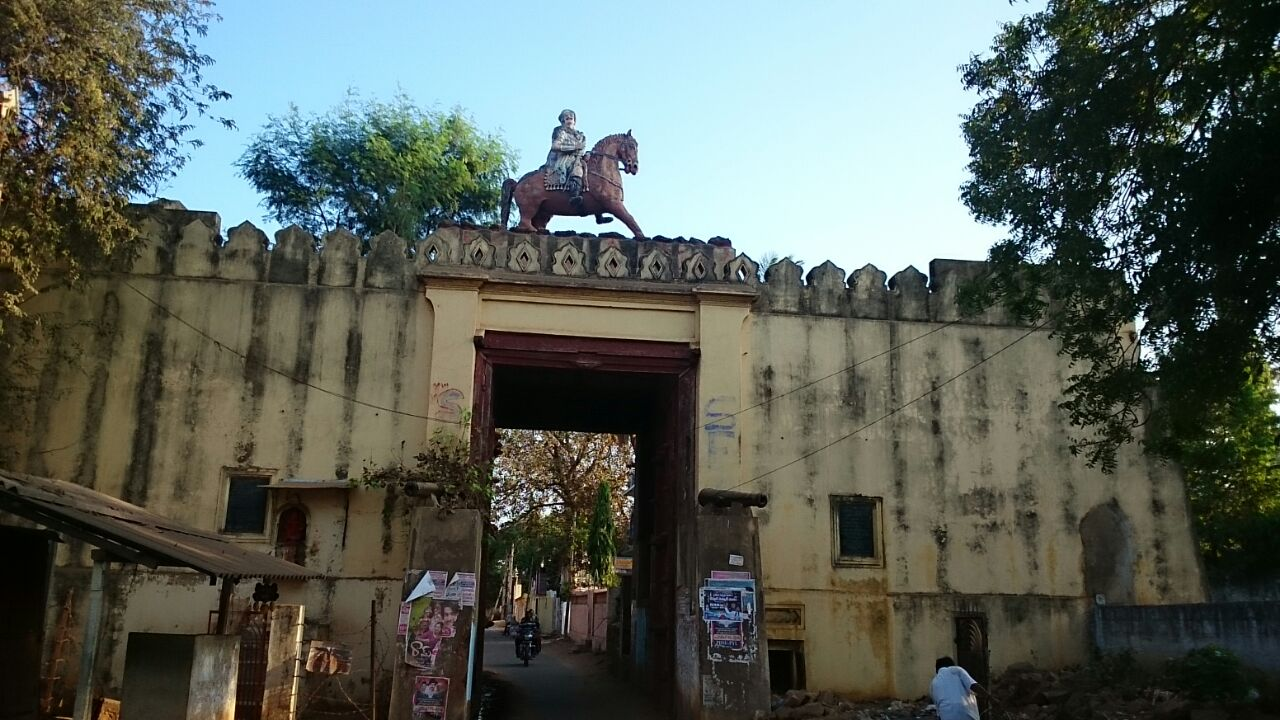
- Nuzvid Fort Gate
- Number of Paraganas: 18 Paraganas
- Possession: 1652
- Peskash: 95,443(by 1877)
- Accession: 1949

Nuzvid Zamindari is one of the ancient Zamindari of the Madras Presidency. It comprises nearly about 288 villages or 18 paraganas. It pays a peskash of 95,443/-. It is further divided into Vuyyuru, Mirzapuram, Kapileswarapuram and other estates.

== History ==
Nuzvid Zamindari is one of the oldest zamindari in the Krishna District. It held huge estates till it was annexed into the Government of India in 1949. Originally the history of this estate dates back to 16th century when the ancestors of the royal family of Nuzvid, Meka Basavanna came to Krishna District. He first built a fort near Gollapalle which was very soon dismantled. Later his great grandson Konappa's second son Meka Venkatadri was given five or six villages in the gollapalle paragana in 1652. Later Venkatadri's son Appayya received the title Raja Bahadur by the Golconda Nawab in 1667. From then they started using the tile Apparao as a suffix to their names. Later their descendant was bestowed with theenhazar Mansabdar which means they can maintain an army of 3000 poens. Totally there were 18 paraganas:

- Gondugollu,
- Pentapadu,
- NIdavaolu,
- Babarazalle,
- Vuyyur, Medur,
- Nunnastalam,
- Chatrayi,
- Vijrayi,
- Gollapalle,
- Gudivada,
- Kalidindi,
- Vinnakota,
- Bhittarazalle Divi,
- Rayagudi,
- Kudikonda,
- Kappalavayi.

== Rebellion ==
Meka Narasimha Apparao rebelled against British when he went out in arrears and stopped paying tribute to the British. Thus he rebelled two times against the British and waged a war with British force but lost and finally the estate fell into the hands of British and they granted the estate after dividing them to six parts to his sons.

== Permanent Settlement ==
After that in 1802-03 this was permanently settled and received a sanad to pay a peskash of 90000/-. It consists nearly about 288 villages in the whole and receives a revenue of 3,00,000/- by 1800s.
