= Nagarkunta, Ranga Reddy district =

Nagarkunta
- Village
- Location in Telangana, India
- Coordinates: 17°11′N 78°10′E
- Country: India
- State: Telangana
- District: Ranga Reddy
- Metro: Ranga Reddy district

Government
  - Body: Mandal Office

Languages
  - Official: Telugu
- Time zone: UTC+5:30 (IST)
- Planning agency: Panchayat
- Civic agency: Mandal Office

Nagarkunta is a village and panchayat in Ranga Reddy district, TS, India. It falls under Shabad mandal.
