= Iluru =

- village
- Interactive map of Iluru
- Location in Andhra Pradesh, India
- Coordinates: 16.2631°N 80.8305°E
- Country: India
- State: Andhra Pradesh
- District: Krishna

Government
  - Type: Gram Panchayat
  - Body: Iluru Gram Panchayat

Area
  - Total: 4.66 km^{2} (1.80 sq mi)

Population (2011)
  - Total: 1,475
  - Density: 317/km^{2} (820/sq mi)

Languages
  - Official: Telugu
- Time zone: UTC+5:30 (IST)
- Postal code: 521 247
- Vehicle registration: AP 16
- Lok Sabha constituency: Machilipatnam
- Vidhan Sabha constituency: Pamarru

Iluru is a village located in Krishna district of Andhra Pradesh, India (Thotlavalluru Mandal).

== Ancient and Historic temple ==
Iluru Rameswara Swamy Temple

Iluru is a historically significant village located on the opposite bank of the Krishna River from Chilumuru. It forms the second part of the Ubhaya Rameswara Kshetram pilgrimage circuit.

=== Religious Significance ===
While the Chilumuru shrine features the sand Lingam created by Sita Devi, the temple at Iluru houses the Lingam brought by Hanuman from Mount Kailasa. According to the Sthala Purana, after finding that the auspicious timing for the consecration at Chilumuru had passed, Lord Rama directed Hanuman to install the Kailasa Lingam across the river in Iluru.

This creates a spiritual "balance" between the two villages:

- Chilumuru: Represents the Saikata Lingam (Sand) established by the power of Sita's devotion.
- Iluru: Represents the Shila Lingam (Stone) brought from the Himalayas by Hanuman.

The village is noted for its traditional architecture and its proximity to the river, which allows devotees to take a holy dip (Snanam) before visiting the shrine. During the Maha Shivaratri and Kartika Masam festivals, a large number of pilgrims travel between Chilumuru and Iluru to complete the "Ubhaya" (both) darshan, often crossing the river or using the connecting road bridge.
