= Anantharam, Bhongir mandal =

Anantharam
- Village
- Location in Telangana, India Anantharam (India)
- Coordinates: 17.35995°N 78.887096°E
- Country: India
- State: Telangana
- District: Yadadri Bhuvanagiri

Population
  - Total: 2,441

Languages
  - Official: Telugu
- Time zone: UTC+5:30 (IST)
- PIN: 508116
- Telephone code: 08685
- Vehicle registration: TG 30
- Nearest city: Hyderabad
- Lok Sabha constituency: Bhongir
- Vidhan Sabha constituency: Bhongir
- Website: telangana.gov.in

Anantharam is a village located in the Bhongir Mandal, Yadadri Bhuvanagiri district, Telangana, India. About 5 km from Bhongir,1 km from National Highway 215 (Warangal to Hyderabad), 40 km From Hyderabad city. According to the census of 2001, the village has 452 households and a total population of 2441. Anantharam village was given an ideal village award during the years of 2006–2013 by United Andhra pradesh.

== List of gram pachayath Sarpanch ==
This is the list of Gram panchayat Sarpanch of Anantharam

| # | Name | Took office | Left office | Remaks |
|---|---|---|---|---|
| 1 | Chindam Mallikarjun | 2019 | Incumbent | elected on 30th Jan 2019 |
| 2 | Vittal Raghu Ramaiah | 2013 | 2018 | |
| 3 | Pallepati Haribabu | 2006 | 2013 | |
| 4 | Chintal Venkat Reddy | 2001 | 2006 | 2nd time |
| 5 | Vittal Mangamma | 1996 | 2001 | |
| 6 | Chintal Venkat Reddy | 1991 | 1996 | |
