= Anantharam, Medak district =

Anantharam
- village
- Location in Telangana, India Anantharam (India)
- Coordinates: 17.688299°N 78.392044°E
- Country: India
- State: Telangana

Languages
  - Official: Telugu
- Time zone: UTC+5:30 (IST)

Anantharam is a village located in Medak district, Telangana, India.

The village has a temple with an ancient history,

In this temple we can participate in Lingabhishekam ourselves. The temple was later renamed as Veera Bharda, Veera Hanuman Sametha Bhavani shakankara Swamy Temple as it has an ancient history dating back to a few hundred years. Swami appears in the form of an ancient Shivalinga from the Kakatiya period.
