= Elgondaguda =

Village and panchayat in Ranga Reddy district, Telangana, India

Elgondaguda sometimes written as Yelgondaguda is a village and panchayat in Ranga Reddy district, Telangana, India. It falls under Shabad mandal. Cherlaguda, Aspalliguda and Mirapur are the other villages in this panchayat.
