= Anantharam, Shamirpet mandal =

Anantharam
- Village
- Location in Telangana, India Anantharam (India)
- Coordinates: 17°41′19.54″N 78°23′34.91″E
- Country: India
- State: Telangana

Languages
  - Official: Telugu
- Time zone: UTC+5:30 (IST)
- Telephone code: 040
- Vehicle registration: AP-26 X XXXX
- Sex ratio: 1:1(approx) ♂/♀

Anantharam is a village in Rangareddy district in Telangana, India. It falls under Shamirpet mandal.
