= China Ogirala =

Chinna Ogirala
- Village
- Interactive map of Chinna Ogirala
- Location in Andhra Pradesh, India Chinna Ogirala (India)
- Coordinates: 16.375°N 80.824°E
- Country: India
- State: Andhra Pradesh
- District: Krishna

Area
  - Total: 6.91 km^{2} (2.67 sq mi)

Population (2011)
  - Total: 3,239
  - Density: 469/km^{2} (1,210/sq mi)

Languages
  - Official: Telugu
- Time zone: UTC+5:30 (IST)
- Vehicle registration: AP
- Nearest city: Vijayawada
- Lok Sabha constituency: Machilipatnam
- Vidhan Sabha constituency: Penamaluru

Chinna Ogirala is a village in Krishna district of the Indian state of Andhra Pradesh. It is located in Vuyyuru mandal of Nuzvid revenue division.
