= Anne Anjaiah =

Indian freedom fighter and politician (1905–1975)

- Born: 1905; Mudunuru, Krishna district, Andhra Pradesh, India
- Died: 1975 (aged 69–70)
- Occupations: Freedom fighter, politician
- Known for: Participation in Non-cooperation Movement, Salt Satyagraha, Quit India Movement
- Political party: Forward Bloc
- Movement: Indian Independence Movement

Anne Anjaiah (1905–1975) was an Indian freedom fighter and a politician from the state of Andhra Pradesh.

== Early life ==
He was born in Mudunuru village in Krishna district, Andhra Pradesh, India.

== Career ==
He joined Non-cooperation movement as a volunteer and established 'Valmiki Ashram' for the training of these volunteers in 1920. He was arrested while participating in Salt satyagraha and imprisoned for six months. He was once again arrested for his involvement in Quit India Movement in 1932.

He was a follower of Mahatma Gandhi and popularized Khadi by establishing many centres in Hyderabad region. He was a communist politician and a prominent member of the Forward Bloc.
