= Peda Ogirala =

- Village
- Interactive map of Peda Ogirala
- Location in Andhra Pradesh, India Peda Ogirala (India)
- Coordinates: 16.389°N 80.808°E
- Country: India
- State: Andhra Pradesh
- District: Krishna district

Area
  - Total: 5.19 km^{2} (2.00 sq mi)

Population (2011)
  - Total: 3,842
  - Density: 740/km^{2} (1,920/sq mi)

Languages
  - Official: Telugu
- Time zone: UTC+5:30 (IST)
- PIN: 521245
- Telephone code: 08676
- Vehicle registration: ap 16
- Nearest city: vijayawada
- Lok Sabha constituency: Machilipatnam
- Vidhan Sabha constituency: Penamaluru

Peda Ogirala is a village in Krishna district of the Indian state of Andhra Pradesh. It is located in Vuyyuru mandal of Nuzvid revenue division.
