= Komarraju Atchamamba =

Indian politician

Member of Parliament, Lok Sabha
- In office 1957 - 1962
- Preceded by: Harindranath Chattopadhyay
- Succeeded by: Kanuri Lakshmana Rao
- Constituency: Vijayawada

Personal details
- Born: 6 September 1906 Guntur, India
- Died: 20 October 1964 (aged 58) Vijayawada, India
- Spouse: V. Venkatarama Sastry
- Children: 1 daughter

'Dr. Komarraju Atchamamba' (6 September 1906 – 20 October 1964) LRCP was an Indian lawyer, obstetrician, gynecologist, politician and a former Member of Parliament.

== Early life and career ==
Komarraju Atchamamba was born to Komarraju Venkata Lakshmana Rao, a historian, and his wife in Guntur in 1906. She participated in the Indian independence movement. She was a student leader of girl volunteers at Indian National Congress Session held at Kakinada in 1924. In 1928, she was also the leader of a black flag demonstration of female students against the Simon Commission in the city of Madras (now Chennai). During 1943–1948, she was the member of the Communist Party of India. Soon thereafter, she joined the Indian National Congress party in 1948. In 1957, she was elected as a member to the 2nd Lok Sabha from Vijayawada representing the Indian National Congress.

She authored a book on Prasuthi – Sisu Poshana in Telugu that aimed to remove the traditional misconceptions held about children's growth. She also published Mahila, a magazine for women. She married V. Venkatarama Sastry in 1940; a daughter Tanya was born out of their marriage.

== Death ==
Atchamamba died on 20 October 1964. In 2006, her birth centenary celebrations were held in Hyderabad.
