= Penamakuru =

- village
- Interactive map of Penamakuru
- Location in Andhra Pradesh, India Penamakuru (India)
- Coordinates: 16°19′21″N 80°49′40″E
- Country: India
- State: Andhra Pradesh
- District: Krishna

Area
  - Total: 6.20 km^{2} (2.39 sq mi)

Population (2011)
  - Total: 2,356
  - Density: 380/km^{2} (984/sq mi)

Languages
  - Official: Telugu
- Time zone: UTC+5:30 (IST)
- Postal code: 521165
- Nearest city: Vijayawada
- Lok Sabha constituency: Machilipatnam
- Vidhan Sabha constituency: Pamarru

Penamakuru is a village located in Krishna district of Andhra Pradesh, India (Thotlavalluru
