= Kapileswarapuram, Krishna district =

Kapileswarapuram
- Village
- Interactive map of Kapileswarapuram
- Location in Andhra Pradesh, India Kapileswarapuram (India)
- Coordinates: 16.333300°N 80.866700°E
- Country: India
- State: Andhra Pradesh
- District: Krishna
- Mandal: Pamidimukkala

Government
  - Type: Gram Panchayat
  - Body: Kapileswarapuram Gram Panchayat

Area
  - Total: 19.42 km^{2} (7.50 sq mi)

Population (2011)
  - Total: 5,689
  - Density: 292.9/km^{2} (758.7/sq mi)

Languages
  - Official: Telugu
- Time zone: UTC+5:30 (IST)
- PIN: 521 246
- Telephone code: +91-08676
- Vehicle registration: AP 16

Kapileswarapuram is a village in Krishna district of the Indian state of Andhra Pradesh. It is located in Pamidimukkala mandal of Nuzvid revenue division.
