= Kankipadu =

- Village
- Location in Andhra Pradesh, India
- Coordinates: 16.4500°N 80.7833°E
- Country: India
- State: Andhra Pradesh
- District: Krishna

Area
  - Total: 3.37 km^{2} (1.30 sq mi)

Population (2011)
  - Total: 14,616
  - Density: 4,340/km^{2} (11,200/sq mi)

Languages
  - Official: Telugu
- Time zone: UTC+5:30 (IST)
- PIN: 521 151
- Vehicle registration: AP 16
- Lok Sabha constituency: Machilipatnam
- Assembly constituency: Penamaluru

Kankipadu is a village in Krishna district of the Indian state of Andhra Pradesh. It is also the mandal headquarters of Kankipadu mandal in Vuyyuru revenue division.

== Geography ==
It is located 55 km towards west from district headquarters Machilipatnam. Kankipadu is located at 16.4500°N 80.7833°E. It has an average elevation of 6 metres (22 feet). Kankipadu is East to Vijayawada .

== Demographics ==
According to Indian census, 2001, the demographic details of Kankipadu mandal is as follows:

- Total Population: 63,243 in 16,074 Households.
- Male Population: 31,676 and Female Population: 31,567
- Children Under 6-years: 7,166 (Boys - 3,635 and Girls - 3,531)
- Total Literates: 39,781

== Education ==
The primary and secondary school education is imparted by government, aided and private schools, under the School Education Department of the state. The medium of instruction followed by different schools are English, Telugu.

== Transport ==
Kankipadu is one of the major locality of Vijaywada. APSRTC serves city buses from different parts city to Kankipadu.The Nearest railway station to Kankipadu are Uppaluru railway station about 7 km and nearest airport is Vijayawada International airport at a distance of about 14 km.

== Notable Persons ==
- Annapurna- film actress
- Girija (1938-95) - film actress
- Kanuri Lakshmana Rao - civil engineer and MP (1962-67)
- Kota Srinivasa Rao - film actor and MLA (1999-2004)

== See also ==
- List of census towns in Andhra Pradesh
