= Kankipadu mandal =

Kankipadu Mandal
- Mandal
- Interactive map of Kankipadu Mandal
- Location in Andhra Pradesh, India
- Coordinates: 16.4344°N 80.7678°E
- Country: India
- State: Andhra Pradesh
- District: Krishna
- Headquarters: Kankipadu

Government
  - Body: Mandal Parishad

Area
  - Total: 108.23 km^{2} (41.79 sq mi)

Population (2011)
  - Total: 69,562
  - Density: 642.72/km^{2} (1,664.6/sq mi)
- Time zone: UTC+5:30 (IST)
- PIN: 521 XXX
- Vehicle registration: AP 16

Kankipadu mandal is one of the 25 mandals in the Krishna district of the Indian state of Andhra Pradesh.

== Settlements ==
The following are the settlements and populations as at 2011.

S.No	Villages	Population
1	Chalivendrapalem	1,043
2	Davuluru	1,490
3	Edupugallu	9,263
4	Godavarru	3,457
5	Jagannadhapuram	606
6	Kandalampadu	296
7	Kolavennu	5,076
8	Konathanapadu	1,681
9	Kunderu	3,065
10	Madduru	3,019
11	Manthena	2,347
12	Maredumaka	997
13	Neppalle	1,949
14	Prodduturu	2,441
15	Punadipadu	7,235
16	Tenneru	3,646
17	Uppaluru	5,105
18	Velpuru	2,230
19	Kankipadu	14,616
