= Pamidimukkala mandal =

Pamidimukkala Mandal
- Mandal
- Interactive Map Outlining mandal
- Location in Andhra Pradesh, India
- Coordinates: 16.292487°N 80.866058°E
- Country: India
- State: Andhra Pradesh
- District: Krishna
- Headquarters: Veerankilaku
- Elevation: 14 m (46 ft)

Population (2011)
  - Total: 53,913

Languages
  - Official: Telugu
- Time zone: UTC+5:30 (IST)
- PIN: 521 XXX
- Telephone code: +91-08676
- Vehicle registration: AP 16

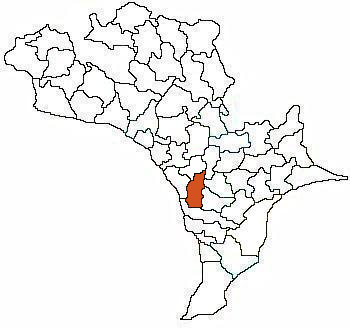
Pamidimukkala Mandal in Krishna District

Pamidimukkala Mandal is one of the 25 Mandals in the Krishna District of the Indian State of Andhra Pradesh. it is 39 km from Vijayawada.

There are 28 Villages within the Pamidimukkala mandal. it is also a part of Capital of Andhra Pradesh (APCRDA). The headquarters of Pamidimukkala mandal is located in Veerankilaku. Chennuruvaripalem is the least populated and Kapileswarapuram is the most highly populated village in Pamidimukkala mandal.

== Villages ==
As of 2011 Census, Pamidimukkala Mandal has 21 villages.

The settlements in the mandal are:

1. Aginiparru
2. Ameenapuram
3. Chennuruvaripalem
4. Choragudi
5. Fathelanka
6. Gopuvanipallem
7. Gurazada
8. Hanumanthapuram
9. Inampudi
10. Inapuru
11. Kapileswarapuram
12. Krishnapuram
13. Kuderu
14. Lankapalle
15. Mamillapalle
16. Mantada
17. Marrivada
18. Meduru
19. Mullapudi
20. Pamidimukkala(Veerankilaku)
21. Penumatcha # Tadanki
