= Pamidimukkala =

Pamidimukkala Veerankilaku
- Village
- Interactive map of Pamidimukkala
- Location in Andhra Pradesh, India
- Coordinates: 16.292523°N 80.866191°E
- Country: India
- State: Andhra Pradesh
- District: Krishna
- Mandal: Pamidimukkala

Government
  - Type: Gram Panchayat
  - Body: Pamidimukkala Gram Panchayat

Area
  - Total: 3.82 km^{2} (1.47 sq mi)
- Elevation: 14 m (46 ft)

Population (2011)
  - Total: 3,185
  - Density: 834/km^{2} (2,160/sq mi)

Languages
  - Official: Telugu
- Time zone: UTC+5:30 (IST)
- PIN: 521 250
- Telephone code: +91-08676
- Vehicle registration: AP 16
- Lok Sabha constituency: Machilipatnam
- Sasana Sabha constituency: Pamarru

Pamidimukkala (also known as Veerankilaku) is a village in Krishna district of the Indian state of Andhra Pradesh. It is located in Pamidimukkala mandal of Noojiveedu revenue division.

== Education ==
The primary and secondary school education is imparted by government and private schools, under the School Education Department of the state. The medium of instruction followed by different schools are English, Telugu.

Schools

Zilla Parishad High School

Jesus High School.

Mandal Parishad Primary School

Sai Sri Upper Primary School

== Nearby Mandals ==
Vuyyuru Mandal

Pamarru Mandal

Thotlavalluru Mandal

Movva Mandal

== See also ==
List of villages in Krishna district
