= Kollur mandal =

Mandal in Bapatla (Andhra Pradesh), India

- Mandal
- Interactive map of Kollur mandal
- Location in Andhra Pradesh, India
- Coordinates: 16°11′05″N 80°47′46″E
- Country: India
- State: Andhra Pradesh
- District: Bapatla
- Headquarters: Kollur

Government
  - Body: Mandal Parishad
  - Tahsildar: P.John peter

Area
  - Total: 108.14 km^{2} (41.75 sq mi)

Population (2011)
  - Total: 55,323
  - Density: 511.59/km^{2} (1,325.0/sq mi)

Languages
  - Official: Telugu
- Time zone: UTC+5:30 (IST)

Kollur mandal is one of the 25 mandals in Bapatla district of the Indian state of Andhra Pradesh. It is under the administration of Repalle revenue division and the headquarters are located at Kollur.

== Geography ==
The mandal is situated on the banks of Krishna River, bounded by Vemuru, Bhattiprolu and Kollipara mandals.

== Demographics ==
As of 2011 census, the mandal had a population of 55,323. The total population constituted 27,709 males and 27,614 females —a sex ratio of 997 females per 1000 males. 4,876 children are in the age group of 0–6 years, of which 2,509 are boys and 2,367 are girls. The average literacy rate stands at 69.31% with 34,967 literates. Kollur is the most populated and Boddulurupadu is the least populated village in the Mandal.

== Administration ==
The present tahsildar is A.Seshagiri Rao. The mandal also forms a part of the Andhra Pradesh Capital Region, under the jurisdiction of APCRDA.

=== Politics ===
Kollur mandal is one of the 5 mandals under Vemuru (SC) (Assembly constituency), which in turn represents Bapatla (SC) (Lok Sabha constituency) of Andhra Pradesh.

=== Settlements ===
As of 2011 census, the mandal has 12 revenue villages, 24 gram panchayats and no towns.

The settlements in the mandal are listed below:

1. Ananthavaram
2. Boddulurupadu
3. Chilumuru
4. Chinapulivarru
5. Donepudi
6. Gajullanka
7. Guruvindapalle
8. Ipur
9. Kollur
10. Pedalanka
11. Potharlanka
12. Ravikampadu
13. Krapa
14. Avulavari palem
15. Kishkindapalem
16. Tadikilapudi
17. Juvvalapalem
18. Sugguna Lanka

== See also ==
- List of mandals in Andhra Pradesh
- List of villages in Guntur district
