= Kollur, Bapatla district =

Kollur
- Village
- Interactive map of Kollur
- Location in Andhra Pradesh, India
- Coordinates: 16°11′05″N 80°47′46″E
- Country: India
- State: Andhra Pradesh
- District: Bapatla
- Mandal: Kollur

Government
  - Type: Panchayati raj
  - Body: Kollur gram panchayat

Area
  - Total: 1,856 ha (4,590 acres)

Population (2011)
  - Total: 16,079
  - Density: 866.3/km^{2} (2,244/sq mi)

Languages
  - Official: Telugu
- Time zone: UTC+5:30 (IST)
- PIN: 522324
- Area code: +91–
- Vehicle registration: AP

Kollur is a village in Bapatla district in the Indian state of Andhra Pradesh. It is the headquarters of Kollur mandal in Repalle revenue division.

== Geography ==
Kollur is situated near the banks of the Krishna River, at 16°11′05″N 80°47′46″E. It is spread over an area of 1,856 ha (4,590 acres).

== Economy ==
Agriculture

The major occupation of the village is agriculture and the main crop cultivated is paddy.

Brick industry

The village is famous for brick manufacturing. The soil which is available at the bank of Krishna River is very good to make bricks. Every year millions of bricks are manufactured and transported to nearby districts and far off places like Hyderabad too. There are around 400 trucks owned by the local citizens. The Brick industry was started first by Sri. Koganti Venkata Rattaiah.

== Government and politics ==
Kollur gram panchayat is the local self-government of the village. It is divided into wards and each ward is represented by a ward member. The village forms a part of Andhra Pradesh Capital Region and is under the jurisdiction of APCRDA.

The Village is represented by Vemuru Assembly constituency in the state legislative assembly. The assembly segment forms a part of Bapatla Lok Sabha constituency which represents the lower house of Indian Parliament. The present MLA from Vemuru is Mr. Nakka Ananda Babu

== Education ==
As per the school information report for the academic year 2018–19, the village has a total of 19 schools. These include 13 Zilla/Mandal Parishad and 6 private schools.
