= NIA Most Wanted =

Most-wanted list by Indian government

The NIA Most Wanted is a most wanted list maintained by India's National Investigation Agency (NIA). Individuals usually are removed from the list only when they are captured, die or the charges against them are dropped.

== History ==
In May 2011, following the Killing of Osama bin Laden, India released a list of the 50 most wanted fugitives it alleged were hiding in Pakistan. The list was prepared in consultation with the Central Bureau of Investigation (CBI), the National Investigation Agency (NIA), Intelligence Bureau (IB), and various law enforcement agencies. According to Ministry of Home Affairs spokesperson Onkar Kedia, the CBI had named 40 people and the NIA included 10 suspected terrorists in the list. However, it was later discovered that two of the people on the list submitted by the CBI were actually in India (one in jail, the other was out on bail), following which the Ministry of Home directed the agencies to review the list. India prepared a new list containing 48 names, and handed it over to Pakistan in July 2011. The list contained Interpol red corner notices, details of the crimes committed, aliases and Pakistani passport and identity document numbers of those allegedly hiding in Pakistan.

Similar lists were given to Pakistani authorities in 2004, 2007, 2010, and March 2011. However, then Minister of Home Affairs P. Chidambaram stated in a May 2011 interview with Karan Thapar on CNN-News18 that "they never acted on any list", were "always dismissive" and described the process as a "ritual". He also blamed the CBI for errors in the 2011 list.

On 26 May 2013, DNA reported that NIA had asked every state to send a report every three months on the latest activities and intelligence about the fugitives on its list. A senior police officer told the newspaper they had to provide "the latest information on the latest locations of these fugitives, whether they are dead or alive and if they attended any religious functions recently". The move was reportedly taken to prevent mistakes in the list, like the ones found in the 2011 list.

In October 2018, the NIA released a new Most Wanted list containing 258 names, including 15 women, with the maximum reward on offer for the arrest of Maoist leader Mupalla L. Rao (aka Ganapathy).

== List ==
Name	Organisation	Country	Status
Dawood Ibrahim	D-Company	Pakistan	At large
Masood Azhar	Jaish-e-Mohammed	Pakistan	At large
Hafiz Saeed	Lashkar-e-Taiba	Pakistan	At large
Ganapathy	CPI-Maoist	Philippines	At large
Zakiur Rehman Lakhvi	Lashkar-e-Taiba	Pakistan	At large
Sajid Mir	Lashkar-e-Taiba	Pakistan	At large
Syed Salahuddin	Hizbul Mujahideen	Pakistan	At large
Ilyas Kashmiri	Jaish-e-Mohammed	Pakistan	Killed
Abdur Rehman Hashim Syed	Lashkar-e-Taiba	Pakistan	At large
Abdul Rehman Makki	Lashkar-e-Taiba	Pakistan	Deceased
David Headley	Lashkar-e-Taiba	United States	Captured
Tahawwur Hussain Rana	Lashkar-e-Taiba	India	Captured
Yasin Malik	Jammu Kashmir Liberation Front	India	Captured
Zabiuddin Ansari	Lashkar-e-Taiba	India	Captured
Riyaz Bhatkal	Indian Mujahideen	Pakistan	At large
Iqbal Bhatkal	Indian Mujahideen	Pakistan	At large
Yasin Bhatkal	Indian Mujahideen	India	Captured
Shafi Armar	Indian Mujahideen, Islamic State – Hind Province	Syria	Killed
Syed Abdul Karim Tunda	Students' Islamic Movement of India	India	Captured
Abdul Subhan Qureshi	Students' Islamic Movement of India	India	Captured
Zakir Naik	Islamic Research Foundation	Malaysia	At large
Chhota Shakeel	D-Company	Pakistan	At large
Anees Ibrahim	D-Company	Pakistan	At large
Tiger Memon	D-Company	Pakistan	At large
Harmeet Singh	Khalistan Liberation Force	Pakistan	Killed
Gurpatwant Singh Pannun	Sikhs for Justice	United States	At large
Paramjit Singh Pamma	Khalistan Tiger Force	United Kingdom	At large
Hardeep Singh Nijjar	Khalistan Tiger Force	Canada	Killed
Lakhbir Singh Rode	International Sikh Youth Federation	Pakistan	Deceased
Goldy Brar	Babbar Khalsa	Canada	At large
Haribhushan	CPI-Maoist	India	Deceased
Akkiraju Haragopal	CPI-Maoist	India	Deceased
Milind Teltumbde	CPI-Maoist	India	Killed
Prashant Bose	CPI-Maoist	India	Deceased
Thippiri Tirupathi	CPI-Maoist	India	Captured
Nambala Keshava Rao	CPI-Maoist	India	Killed
Mallojula Venugopal	CPI-Maoist	India	Captured
Madvi Hidma	CPI-Maoist	India	Killed
Barsa Deva	CPI-Maoist	India	Captured
Abhizeet Asom	United Liberation Front of Asom	United Kingdom	At large
Paresh Baruah	United Liberation Front of Asom	China	At large

== See also ==
- FBI Most Wanted Terrorists
