= Naxalite–Maoist insurgency =

Indian anti-government conflict since 1967

Date	18 May 1967 – present (59 years, 6 months and 3 days)
Location	India
Status	Ongoing as a low-level insurgency

Belligerents
India; CAPF; CRPF; CoBRA; BSF; ITBP; CISF; State Armed Police Forces; DRG; Greyhounds (AP & Telangana); Jharkhand Jaguar; Odisha SOG; Kerala Thunderbolts; Special Task Force (Bihar); Anti Naxal Force (Karnataka); Militias: (until 2011): Bhumi Sena; Kuer Sena; Lorik Sena; Salwa Judum; Sunlight Sena; Tritiya Prastuti Committee	Naxalites; CPI (Maoist); PLGA; Jharkhand Janmukti Parishad; PLFI; Revolutionary Communist Centre (2006–2019); Odisha Maobadi Party (2002–2015); CPI(ML) Liberation (1974–1992); Lal Sena; CPI(ML) Janashakti (1992–2013); CPUSI (1997–2005); CPI(ML) ND; CPI(ML) MM (until 2012); ABNES (until 2002); TNLA (until 2005)

Commanders and leaders
(India) Droupadi Murmu (India) Narendra Modi (India) Amit Shah (India) R. R. Bhatnagar (India) Pranay Sahay; Mahendra Karma X (Salwa Judum) Brahmeshwar Singh X (Ranvir Sena) Past presidents and prime ministers: (India) Zakir Husain (1967 to 1969); (India) Indira Gandhi (1967 to 1977; 1970 to 1984); (India) V. V. Giri (1969); (India) Zakir Husain (1967 to 1969); (India) Fakhruddin Ali Ahmed (1974 to 1977); (India) Morarji Desai (1977 to 1979); (India) Neelam Sanjiva Reddy (1977 to 1982); (India) Charan Singh (1979 to 1980); (India) Zail Singh (1982 to 1987); (India) Rajiv Gandhi (1984 to 1989); (India) Ramaswamy Venkataraman (1987 to 1992); (India) V. P. Singh (1989 to 1990); (India) Chandra Shekhar (1990 to 1991); (India) P. V. Narasimha Rao (1991 to 1996); (India) Shankar Dayal Sharma (1992 to 1997); (India) Atal Bihari Vajpayee (1996; 1998 to 2004); (India) H. D. Deve Gowda (1996 to 1997); (India) Inder Kumar Gujral (1997 to 1998); (India) K. R. Narayanan (1997 to 2002); (India) A. P. J. Abdul Kalam (2002 to 2007); (India) Manmohan Singh (2004 to 2014); (India) Pratibha Patil (2007 to 2012); (India) Pranab Mukherjee (2012 to 2017); (India) Ram Nath Kovind (2017 to 2022)	Ganapathy Past senior commanders: Keshava Rao † Thippiri Tirupathi (surrendered) Barsa Deva (surrendered) Madvi Hidma † Abhay (surrendered) Chalpathi † Charu Majumdar # Jangal Santhal # Kanu Sanyal # Babu Panda (POW) Azad † Anand # Kondapalli Seetharamaiah # Kosa † Kishenji † Kishan (POW) Ashutosh Tudu (POW) Naveen † Narmada Akka † Deo Kumar Singh # Milind Teltumbde † Jagdish Mahto † Ravindra Singh (POW) Mahendar Singh † Shankar Rao † Vinod Gowda †

Strength
CRPF: 313,634; State Police Forces: 1,289,900	350+ (2026 estimate, according to the Government of India); 6,500–9,500 (2013 est.); 10,000–20,000 (2009–2010 est.)

Casualties and losses
2000–2026: 2,726 killed	2000–2026: 5,076 killed 20,384 surrendered 17,269 captured
- 2000–2026: 4,140 civilians killed

The Naxalite–Maoist insurgency is an ongoing conflict between the Government of India and communist groups. The Naxalites are a group of communist organisations following Maoist political sentiment and ideology, and claim to be fighting for rural poor and wage a people's war against the government.

The insurgency started after the 1967 Naxalbari uprising and the subsequent split of the Communist Party of India (Marxist) leading to the creation of a Marxist–Leninist faction. The faction later splintered into various smaller groups. The Naxalites' armed wing, the People's Liberation Guerrilla Army, was declared a terrorist organisation under the Unlawful Activities (Prevention) Act of India (1967), and has been responsible for numerous attacks causing several deaths and injuries to civilians and security personnel.

The insurgency reached its peak in the late 2000s and has been on the decline since then due to the counter-insurgency actions and development plans formulated by the Government of India. The Naxal influence zone, known as the "Red Corridor", has shrunk from a peak of nearly 180 districts in the late 2000s to 3 districts by early 2026, with over 5,000 insurgents being killed since the 2000 and more than 10,000 surrendering between 2015 and 2025.

== History ==
=== Formation and early years (late 1960s to 1970s) ===
In 1967, a faction of the Communist Party of India (Marxist) led by Charu Majumdar, Kanu Sanyal, and Jangal Santhal called the "Siliguri group" wanted a protracted people's war in India similar to the Chinese Communist Revolution and Majumdar wrote the Historic Eight Documents which became the foundation of the Naxalite movement. The party was part of a coalition government in West Bengal. Majumdar believed that the party would support his doctrine with other leaders like land minister Hare Krishna Konar who had been supporting his rhetoric suggesting that "the militant confiscation of land was integral to the party's programme." However, the party did not approve of the armed uprising, which led to internal conflict with the sympathizers of the group.

In March 1967, a few peasant workers seized a plot of land from its jotedar (aristocrat). In May 1967, the Siliguri Kishan Sabha, of which Santhal was the president, declared their support for the movement initiated by Sanyal and their readiness to adopt an armed struggle to redistribute land to the landless. The group advocated to initiate an armed struggle. In Naxalbari in West Bengal, the peasants fought when a sharecropper of tribal background, who had been given land by the courts under the tenancy laws, was attacked by the previous landlord's men. When the police arrived, they were ambushed by a group led by Santhal, and in the ensuing fight, 11 people including a police inspector were killed. In November 1967, a group led by Sushital Ray Chowdhury organised the All India Coordination Committee of Communist Revolutionaries (AICCCR).

The uprising led to the formation of Communist Party of India (Marxist–Leninist) (CPI-ML) in April 1969, which was announced by Sanyal at a mass meeting in Calcutta. It inspired similar movements in states like Odisha, Madhya Pradesh, Andhra Pradesh and Kerala. In 1971, Satyanarayan Singh revolted against the leadership and split the CPI-ML into two, forming a separate provisional committee. The Naxalites gained presence among the radical sections of the student groups in Calcutta. Students left school to join the Naxalites and Majumdar declared that the revolutionary warfare was to take place not only in the rural areas as before, but now everywhere and spontaneously. He also declared an "annihilation line" and issued a dictum to assassinate individual "class enemies" such as landlords, businessmen, teachers, police officers, politicians and others.

In response, the Government of West Bengal instituted countermeasures against the Naxalites. The insurgents clashed with the West Bengal Police and CPI-M cadres. With the public rejection of Majumdar's calls for extrajudicial killings, Naxalites alleged human rights violations by the state government, which responded that "the state was effectively fighting a civil war and that democratic pleasantries had no place in a war, especially when the opponent did not fight within the norms of democracy and civility". With the support of the central government, Operation Steeplechase was launched with the aid of the paramilitary forces of the Indian Armed Forces, which resulted in the killing and imprisoning of suspected Naxalites and their cadres, including senior leaders. In July 1972, Majumdar was arrested by the West Bengal Police and he later died in police custody. After his death, the CPI-ML split into further factions such as the Mahadev Mukherjee faction and the CPI-ML Liberation in 1972. By 1973, the main leaders of the Naxalites were either eliminated or arrested. As a result of both external repression and a failure to maintain internal unity, the movement degenerated into extreme sectarianism and the original party fractured into more than 40 separate small groups.

=== Further growth and government action (1980s to late 1990s) ===
The late 1970s saw the spread of Naxalism to other states of India. Though the first wave of insurgent violence ended badly, it did not eliminate the movement altogether. The insurgency arose in South India in the early 1980s and on 22 April 1980, the Communist Party of India (Marxist–Leninist) People's War, commonly called as People's War Group (PWG) was founded by Kondapalli Seetharamaiah. He sought a more efficient structure in attacks and followed the principles of Majumdar. The insurgents kidnapped landlords and forced them to confess to crimes, apologize to villagers, and repay forced bribes. By the early 1980s, the insurgents had established a stronghold and sanctuary along the Andhra Pradesh–Orissa border.

In 1985, the Naxalites began ambushing police forces and killed N.Yadagiri Reddy, a sub-inspector of police in Warangal district of Andhra Pradesh. In response, a special task force called the Greyhounds was formed by the Government of Andhra Pradesh. The governments of Andhra Pradesh and Orissa quelled down the rebels with a variety of counterinsurgency measures. The states established special laws that enabled police to capture and detain Naxalite cadres, fighters and presumed supporters. They invited additional central paramilitary forces, set up organisations to attract youth away from the Naxalites, started rehabilitation programs for those who surrendered. In the 1990s, several incidents of mass murders happened in Bihar wherein Maoists killed members of the land-owning Bhumihar community, who then retaliated through militias.

=== Peak of insurgency (2000s) ===
On 2 December 2000, the armed wing of the Maoists called the People's Liberation Guerrilla Army was founded and mostly equipped with small arms. On 1 October 2003, the Naxalites attacked a convoy of then Chief Minister of Andhra Pradesh Chandrababu Naidu en route to Tirumala, in which the Chief Minister was injured. In response, the Andhra Pradesh government embarked on a rapid modernisation of its police force and up-gradation of its technical and operational capabilities to fight the insurgents and about 246 insurgents were killed during the year. In September 2004, the CPI-Maoist was founded through the merger of the People's War Group, and the Maoist Communist Centre of India. In January 2005, peace talks between the Andhra Pradesh government and the Maoists broke down after the government had not agreed to the release of prisoners and to redistribution of land. In August 2005, the government of Andhra Pradesh outlawed the CPI-Maoist party and other affiliated organisations and arrested suspected members and sympathizers of the group.

The Maoists orchestrated several attacks on government facilities across various states. They freed prisoners after attacks on prisons and stole weapons from government facilities. They also attacked anti-Maoist protesters, took hostages and killed those who opposed them. Police men and security forces were targeted in ambushes using automatic weapons and improvised explosive devices. In 2007, the Maoists killed Member of Parliament Sunil Mahato in Jharkhand and a local leader in Andhra Pradesh. They were also involved in local protests against the establishment of Special Economic Zones and killed tribal youths of counter militia organisations. In 2008, Naxal attacks increased in Orissa, which inflicted multiple casualties on the security forces. On average, 700 people were killed in the conflict every year from 2005 to 2008.

Between 2009 and 2010, the conflict escalated turning these two years into the deadliest with more than 1000 casualties annually. The Indian government announced a nationwide initiative called the Integrated Action Plan for broad coordinated operations aimed at combatting and undermining support for the Naxalites in selected states. The plan included funding for grass-roots economic development projects in the affected areas and increased special police funding for containment and reduction of Naxalite influence.

Over 90 percent of weapons used were looted from police armouries. Weapons were taken by ambushing or bribing security personnel. Other weapons were made or smuggled. By 2006 they had 20,000 modern weapons.

=== Counter-action and decline (2010s–present) ===
In 2009, the Indian government launched a massive military offensive, code named Operation Green Hunt and planned to deploy nearly 50,000 soldiers over two years, with the objectives of eliminating Naxal insurgents and bringing stability to the regions. The Maoists targeted security personnel involved in the operations against them with major attacks such as the Silda camp attack, Dantewada ambush and 2010 Dantewada bus bombing. They also killed civilians suspected of helping the government and those who were involved in building public infrastructure. Naxalites carried out a series of attacks, including shootings and bombings across Indian states and the security forces retaliated in response. Naxalites were also suspected of attempted train derailments.

In early 2010s, Karnataka was removed from the list of Naxal-affected states. The Government of Madhya Pradesh claimed that the Naxal insurgency has reduced in the state and attributed its success to the rural development schemes. In July 2011, the central government announced that the number of Naxal-affected areas were reduced to 83 districts across nine states. Senior Maoist leaders were killed by the security forces, and many were arrested. In early 2012, the Naxalites kidnapped foreign nationals and a Member of the Legislative Assembly in Odisha to force the government to release its cadres held as prisoners. In May 2013, a Naxal attack in Chhattisgarh resulted in the deaths of 24 Indian National Congress leaders including the former state minister Mahendra Karma and the Chhattisgarh Congress chief Nand Kumar Patel.

In the later 2010s, while the Maoists continued to carry out planned attacks such as the 2014 Chhattisgarh attack, the 2017 Sukma attack and the 2018 Sukma attack, the security forces were able to retaliate in response. The security forces engaged in multiple gun battles which resulted in more than 1000 Maoists being killed in the late 2010s. In September 2018, the Naxalites killed Member of Andhra Pradesh Legislative Assembly Kidari Sarveswara Rao and former member Siveri Soma in Araku Valley. The Kerala Police eliminated the presence of Maoists in Kerala in 2019. Sporadic attacks such as the 2021 Sukma–Bijapur attack and 2023 Dantewada bombing on security personnel and civilians continued into the 2020s. The anti-insurgency operations also intensified with higher success rate resulting in the death or capture of several insurgent leaders. The Naxal influence reduced to about 70 districts in 2021 of which only 25 were most affected from a high of 180 districts in the late 2000s. Though there was a sporadic increase in Naxal activity in parts of Telangana, West Bengal and Madhya Pradesh, the Maoist activity have relatively suppressed due to the increase in anti-terror operations conducted by the security forces in 2024. Operations like the 2024 Kanker clash and the 2024 Abujhmarh clash resulted in a great loss of personnel and material for the Maoists.

Sparse Naxal attacks continued into 2025 such as the IED attack in Bijapur District that killed nine policemen, In April–May 2025, the Indian authorities conducted a 21-day anti-Maoist operation named Operation Black Forest (Operation Kagar) in the Karregutta Hills region in the Chhattisgarh-Telangana border, that resulted in the deaths of 31 insurgents and three security personnel. On 21 May, Nambala Keshava Rao, the general secretary of CPI (Maoist), was killed alongside 26 other Naxals.

From 2015 to 2025, over 10,000 Naxals have surrendered to the government and security forces. India convinced Naxals to surrender through promises of housing and monetary compensation, though other Naxals faced "extremely brutal" attacks. In February 2026, Deputy Chief Minister Vijay Sharma stated that the insurgency was in its "final phase". Minister of Home Affairs Amit Shah vowed that the insurgency would cease by the end of the following month. On 30 March 2026, India declared victory in the insurgency. Vijay Sharma stated that all Naxal insurgents had been killed or surrendered, other than two commanders at large. These senior commanders pledged to continue the armed struggle against the Indian state, saying that they remain committed to continue fighting. Ashutosh Sharma writing for The Hindu stated that the Modi government had begun to reframe "Maoism itself by equating dissent with insurgency, thus extending the crackdown from jungles to cities."

== Red Corridor ==
Areas with Naxalite activity in 2007 (left), in 2013 (middle), in 2024 (right)

The influence zone of the Naxalites was called the "Red Corridor". The most affected districts accounted for 85% of the left wing extremist incidents in India.

The insurgency was its peak in the late 2000s with nearly 180 affected districts across an area of 92,000 km^{2} (36,000 sq mi) and has been on the decline since then. Following counter-insurgency efforts, the number of Naxalite-affected districts in India declined significantly, to 126 affected with 35 "most affected" in 2018.

As of the early 2020s, the Naxal activity was largely concentrated in two clusters, the first in and round the forested remote hilly areas of Dandakaranya spread across Chhattisgarh and Odisha and the second in the border region of Jharkhand-Bihar-West Bengal. The number of affected districts reduced to 70 with 25 declared as "most affected" in 2021, and to 38 districts in 2024. In April 2025, the union home minister Amit Shah declared that six districts– Bijapur Kanker, Narayanpur, and Sukma in Chhattisgarh, West Singhbhum in Jharkhand, and Gadchiroli in Maharashtra as "most affected" by Naxalism. Additionally, six districts–Alluri Sitarama Raju in Andhra Pradesh, Balaghat in Madhya Pradesh, Kandhamal, Kalahandi and Malkangiri in Odisha, and Bhadradri-Kothagudem in Telangana were declared as "districts of concern".

== Government response ==
Then Prime Minister of India Manmohan Singh called the Naxalites the "single biggest internal security challenge ever faced by our country" and in June 2011, he said, "Development is the master remedy to win over people", adding that the government was "strengthening the development work in the 60 Maoist-affected districts. In 2010, Home Secretary Gopal Krishna Pillai acknowledged that there were legitimate grievances regarding the local people's access to the forest land and produce and the distribution of benefits from mining and hydropower developments. However, he claimed that the Naxalites' long-term goal was to establish an Indian communist state and the government wanted to tackle the Naxalites head-on to take back the lost areas.

=== Infrastructure development ===
The Indian government launched three schemes–Special Central Assistance (SCA), Security Related Expenditure (SRE), and Special Infrastructure Scheme (SIS) for the economic development of the Naxal-affected areas. About ₹375 million (US$4.0 million) was sanctioned for more than 10,000 projects till 2021. About ₹276 million (US$2.9 million) of the funds were earmarked for the most affected districts. As of 2024, 85% of the projects were complete, including the construction of 14,618 km (9,083 mi) of roads out of the planned 17,600 km (10,900 mi), establishment of 7,768 mobile telephone towers out of 10,505 planned, opening of 1,007 bank branches, 937 ATMs and 5,731 post offices. About 179 Eklavya Model Residential Schools were operational out of 234 approved, and 46 Industrial Training Institutes and 49 Skill Development Centres were established.

In addition, women self-help groups and industries were established by various state governments. The Government of Madhya Pradesh aided 23,113 women self-help groups covering 274,000 families in the affected districts and established 18 industries that would employ 4,000 people. Additionally, loans to tribals were waived, and land right ownership documents were granted.

=== Counter-insurgency ===
In 2018, the central government sought to stem insurgency by earmarking development funds for revolt-hit areas and improving policing. The government planned a ₹250 billion (US$2.7 billion) scheme for the modernisation of central and state police forces in the next three years. Under the SRE scheme, 400 fortified police stations were established at the cost of ₹140 million (US$1.5 million). In addition, funds were utilised to hire helicopters, media services, and for other public relations and community activities.

Since late 1990, several armed anti-insurgency vigilante groups have were backed by the government to fight against the Maoists. In Chhattisgarh, Salwa Judum, consisted of local tribal youth was formed received support and training from the Government of Chhattisgarh, as an anti-insurgency vigilante group aimed at countering the violence in the region in 2005. Various other paramilitary vigilante groups had emerged in other states such Andhra Pradesh, some of these groups were accused of extrajudicial murders of civil liberties activists. According to the Institute of Peace and Conflict studies, while Naxal groups recruited children in different capacities and exposed them, the same accusation was levelled at Salwa Judum and the special police officers assisting the government security forces. The allegations against Salwa Judum and the special police officers were rejected by a Supreme Court of India-appointed fact-finding commission of the National Human Rights Commission of India which determined that the Salwa Judum was a spontaneous reaction by tribals against Maoist atrocities perpetrated against them.

On 5 July 2011, the Supreme Court declared militia groups such as the Salwa Judum to be illegal and unconstitutional, ordering their disbandment, the confiscation of their weapons, and a government investigation into their alleged criminal activities and human rights violations.

== Casualties ==
The Naxalites have conducted multiple attacks on the security forces, government workers and civilians, with casualties on both sides. To enforce their control over the population, the Maoists have often convened kangaroo courts to mete out summary justice, death, beatings, or exile. As per the South Asia Terrorism portal, the conflict has resulted in the deaths of more than 12,102 people including 4,134 civilians, 2,722 security force personnel and 5,001 Naxalites from 2000 to 2025. As per the BBC, more than 6,000 people were killed in the 20 years between 1990 and 2010. Al Jazeera estimated the total death toll as 10,000 between 1980 and 2011.

Casualties by year
Year	Fatal incidents	Deaths				
Year	Fatal incidents	Civilians	Security Forces	Naxalites	Not Specified	Total
2000^{[β]}	116	94	40	135	9	278
2001	199	130	116	169	44	459
2002	182	123	115	163	30	431
2003	319	193	114	246	30	583
2004	127	89	82	87	22	280
2005	343	259	147	282	24	712
2006	248	249	128	343	14	734
2007	274	218	234	195	25	672
2008	246	184	215	228	19	646
2009	407	368	319	314	12	1013
2010	481	630	267	265	18	1180
2011	302	259	137	210	0	606
2012	235	156	96	125	1	378
2013	186	164	103	151	0	418
2014	185	127	98	121	4	350
2015	171	90	56	110	0	256
2016	263	122	62	250	0	434
2017	200	107	76	152	0	335
2018	217	108	73	230	0	411
2019	176	99	49	154	0	302
2020	138	61	44	134	0	239
2021	124	58	51	128	0	237
2022	107	53	15	67	0	135
2023	112	61	31	56	0	148
2024	161	80	21	296	0	397
2025	141	54	33	390	0	477
2026	8	2	0	37	0	39
Total	5668+	4138+	2722+	5038+	252+	12150+

- ^{β} From March

== In popular culture ==
- Chakravyuh (2012) is a Hindi film based on the naxal insurgency in an imaginary village of NandiGhat.
- Newton (2017) is a Hindi film based on a government servant who is sent to a Naxal affected area on election duty.
- Kaattu Vithachavar (2018) is a Malayalam film about the Naxal movement during the emergency period and the related Rajan case.
- Unda (2019) is a Malayalam film based on a real incident that occurred during the 2014 Lok Sabha election, when a Kerala Police unit was sent to a Maoist-affected area of Chhattisgarh as part of election duty.
- Bastar: The Naxal Story (2024) is a Hindi film based on the naxal insurgency in the Bastar district of Chhattisgarh.

== See also ==
- Timeline of the Naxalite–Maoist insurgency
- Communist parties in India
- Separatist movements of India
- Terrorism in India
- Terrorist incidents in India
