= Barsa Deva =

Indian maoist

- Born: Puvarti, Southern Sukma, Madhya Pradesh (present–day Chhattisgarh, India)
- Known for: Member of CPI(Maoist) and PLGA
- Criminal charges: Left-wing extremism, Murder
- Criminal status: Surrendered

Barsa Deva known by his nom de guerre Barsa Sukka or Devanna is a former Indian Maoist and Former Commander of the Battalion No.1, which contained the hardcore Maoists of PLGA.

== Biography ==
Deva was born in the Puvarti village in Sukma district, Chhattisgarh. During early 2000s Deva left home and joined in the newly formed PLGA and began to participate it Maoist activities. He was involved in many attacks and looting against both civilians and Security forces.

In 2017, he replaced Madvi Hidma to become the Commander of the Battalion No. 1, which is the platoon containing the most trained and hardcore Maoists in the group.

In 2025, after the killing of Nambala Keshava Rao by Security Forces, the position of General-Secretary of CPI(Maoist) remained vacant, which is the highest position in the group, the security Forces suspected either Deva or Hidma to be the potential replacement in the position.

On 2 January 2026, Barsa Deva along with 19 Maoist cadres surrendered to the Telegana government along with 48 weapons, 2,200 rounds of ammunition and ₹20 lakh of extorted money.

== See also ==
- Madvi Hidma
