= Nambala Keshava Rao =

Naxal militant leader (1955–2025)

2nd General Secretary of the Communist Party of India (Maoist)
- In office 10 November 2018 – 21 May 2025
- Preceded by: Muppala Lakshmana Rao
- Succeeded by: Thippiri Tirupathi

Personal details
- Born: 1955 Jiyannapet, Srikakulam district, Andhra State, India
- Died: 21 May 2025 (aged 69–70) Abujhmarh, Chhattisgarh, India
- Party: Communist Party of India (Maoist)
- Other political affiliations: People's War Group
- Education: National Institute of Technology, Warangal

Nambala Keshava Rao (1955 – 21 May 2025), commonly known by his nom de guerre Basavraj or Gaganna, was an Indian militant, Maoist politician and the general secretary of the Communist Party of India (Maoist). He was on the Indian National Investigation Agency's list of most wanted criminals.

Earlier, he had been the chief of the CPI's Central Military Commission. In November 2018, he became the supreme commander of the party after the resignation of Muppala Lakshmana Rao (alias Ganapathy).

Rao was killed in a gunfight with government forces in the 21 May 2025 Abujhmarh clash, alongside 27 other Naxals.

== Early life and education ==
Rao was from Jiyannapet village, Kota Bommali mandal, Srikakulam district, Andhra State. He was the son of late Vasudeva Rao, a teacher and the late Narayanamma, a housewife. He had a brother and two sisters.

He was a onetime kabaddi player, passed B.Tech. from Regional Engineering College, now known as National Institute of Technology, Warangal. He was a member of the Radical Students Union and became the president of the college students union. He was active in left-wing student politics and attached to CPI-ML (People's War). Rao was arrested only once in 1980 at Srikakulam when there was a clash between two students' unions, Radical Students Union (RSU) and the RSS student wing Akhil Bharatiya Vidyarthi Parishad (ABVP). He owned no property in his name in his native village, which he left in the late 1970s.

== Political life ==
Intelligence sources have said that Rao employed strong military tactics in the form of guerrilla warfare and used new forms of improvised explosive devices (IEDs). He was not only aggressive in on-field strategy but strongly committed to Marxism–Leninism–Maoism ideology. He was involved with the Naxalite movement since the 1970s. When the CPI (ML) Peoples War was formed in 1980 in Andhra Pradesh, he was one of the key organisers. He was the first commander to enter East Godavari and Visakhapatnam districts. Rao along with Mallojula Koteswara Rao alias Kishanji, Mallujola Venugopal and Malla Raji Reddy received training in the forests of Bastar from a group of former fighters of the Liberation Tigers of Tamil Eelam (LTTE) in ambush tactics and the handling of Gelatin in 1987. In 1992, he was elected a member of the Central Committee of the erstwhile Communist Party of India (Marxist–Leninist) People's War. In 2004, when the Communist Party of India (Maoist) was formed through the merger of Communist Party of India (Marxist-Leninist) People's War and Maoist Communist Centre of India (MCCI), Rao was made the head of the Central Military Commission of the party as well as Politburo member having strength of his expertise in military tactics and use of explosives, especially the use of IEDs. National Investigation Agency announced a reward of Rs 10 lakh for Rao. He was also popular in the name of Prakash alias Krishna alias Darapu Narasimha Reddy. On 10 November 2018, Rao replaced Ganapathy as the new General Secretary of CPI (Maoist).

=== Involvement in terrorist attacks ===
==== 2010-2012 ====
Rao was suspected of being behind almost all the major Maoist attacks that took place in Chhattisgarh, Maharashtra and Odisha while he was alive. According to police sources the killing of a Telugu Desam Party leader Kidari Saraveshwar Rao at Araku in Andhra Pradesh is attributed to him. A senior security official said that Rao alias Basavaraju had been at the forefront in the 2010 Maoist attack in Dantewada in which 76 CRPF soldiers were killed, the Jeeram Ghati attack in which 27 people, including former state minister Mahendra Karma and Chhattisgarh Congress leader Nand Kumar Patel, were killed. He was the brain behind the outfit's attacks against security personnel and his promotion might have seen a spike in such incidents.

==== 2013-2025 ====
Rao is believed to have been involved in some major terrorist attacks including 2013 Latehar Ambush, 2018 Sukma IED Attack, 2019 Gadchiroli Landmine Blast, 2021 Sukma-Bijapur Ambush, 2023 Dantewada IED blast, and 2025 Bijapur IED attack.

- 2013 Latehar Ambush: Rao is believed to have masterminded the 2013 Latehar Ambush in Jharkhand, where a photosensitive IED was concealed inside the body of a slain CRPF personnel, intending to inflict further casualties on rescue teams and medical responders.
- 2018 Sukma IED Attack: Maoists carried out an improvised explosive device (IED) attack on a mine-protected vehicle transporting CRPF personnel in Chhattisgarh's Sukma district, resulting in the deaths of nine troops and injuries to six others, according to Indian sources.
- 2019 Gadchiroli Landmine Blast: A landmine detonated beneath a police vehicle just hours after Maoists set fire to vehicles at a road construction site in Maharashtra's Gadchiroli district. According to Indian sources, the blast killed 15 police personnel and the driver.
- 2021 Sukma-Bijapur Ambush: During an anti-Maoist operation in Chhattisgarh, security forces were ambushed, leading to an intense and prolonged firefight. According to Indian sources, 22 personnel were killed and 32 others injured.
- 2023 Dantewada IED blast: An improvised explosive device (IED) targeted a vehicle returning from an anti-Maoist operation at Chhattisgarh's Dantewada district, killing 10 District Reserve Guard (DRG) personnel and a civilian driver.
- 2025 Bijapur IED attack: A powerful IED blast struck a vehicle returning from an anti-Maoist operation at Chhattisgarh's Bijapur district, resulting in the deaths of eight District Reserve Guard (DRG) personnel and a civilian driver.

== Death ==
Rao, along with 27 other Naxals were killed during a gunfight between Indian security forces and Naxals in Abujhmarh, Chhattisgarh on 21 May 2025. He is the first serving general secretary of any Indian Communist Party to be killed by Indian Security Forces, in the history of the four decade insurgency. Left wing political parties like, CPI, CPI(M), CPI (ML) Liberation condemned the death of Keshava alleging that centre denied any chance for dialogue.
