= CNM =

CNM can refer to:

- CNM, IATA code for Cavern City Air Terminal, Carlsbad, New Mexico, US
- CNM, station code for Cheltenham Spa railway station in Cheltenham, UK
- cnm, ISO 639-3 code for the Chuj language
- Central New Mexico Community College, in Albuquerque, New Mexico, US
- Centronuclear myopathy, a congenital muscle disorder
- Certified Nurse-Midwife, an American nursing certification
- Chetna Natya Manch, the "cultural troupe" of the Communist Party of India (Maoist)
- Consensual non-monogamy, a style of sexual relationship
- Conservatorio Nacional de Música (Mexico), a music conservatory in Mexico City
