= Chetna Natya Manch =

Indian organization

Chetna Natya Manch चेतना नाट्य मञ्च
- Abbreviation: CNM
- Formation: 1997
- Founder: Communist Party of India (Marxist–Leninist) People's War
- Type: Voluntary association, Cultural organisation
- Legal status: Banned in Chhattisgarh by the Andhra Pradesh government
- Purpose: To inspire people to embrace Marxism–Leninism–Maoism
- Location: Chhattisgarh, Odisha, Andhra Pradesh
- Region served: India
- Parent organization: Communist Party of India (Maoist)
- Volunteers: 10,000

Chetna Natya Manch (CNM; English: Awakening and Dramatic Arts Front) is the "Cultural Troupe" of the Communist Party of India (Maoist). Chetna Natya Manch is headed by Leng (who is from Andhra Pradesh), and has more than 10,000 members.

== Background and activities ==
"Gearing the fallows,
Ploughing the fields,
With our sweat as streams,
We harvested the crops.
Whose was the grain?
Whose was the gruel?"

— Cherabandaraju's song, oftentimes performed by the CNM

The CNM is the "propaganda unit" and "cultural wing" of the Communist Party of India (Marxist–Leninist) People's War (PWG), and "conducted dance, drama, poetry and musical workshops" in the villages, "inspiring young people to join the PWG." According to them, they are a "cultural team", and they "don't fight" but only "sing". They also focus on literature and plastic arts. They have raised their music cassettes by themselves and also have a "mobile editing unit."

The CNM attracts "huge crowds" to their presentations.

== Publication ==
The CNM, in August 1994, began publishing a bimonthly magazine named Jhankar (in Bengali, Gondi, Hindi, Marathi and Telugu). It is still published.

== Opposition ==
The government of India's ministry of Information and Broadcasting has "activated its own cultural wing" to "counter" the CNM, which they believe is "instigating the tribals against the Indian state through songs and cultural programmes."

The CNM was banned by the government of Chhattisgarh on 16 August 2013 under the Chhattisgarh Special Public Security Act for its alleged participation in the "insurgency activities" in the Red corridor region of Chhattisgarh, and after that, the ban was extended till 30 August 2015.

== See also ==
- Krantikari Adivasi Mahila Sangathan
- Nari Mukti Sangh
