= Ravi Sharma =

Ravi Sharma may refer to:

- Ravi (composer) (Ravi Shankar Sharma, 1926–2012), Indian music director
- Ravi Sharma (Uttar Pradesh politician) (born 1971)
- Ravi Sharma (Maoist politician) (active since 1999)
