= Varkapur Chandramouli =

Indian maoist

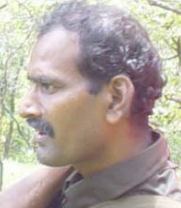
- Died: 27 December 2006 (aged 42–43); Gudem Kotha Veedhi, Andhra Pradesh

Varkapur Chandramouli (? — 27 December 2006) alias Devanna was an Indian Maoist leader and Central Committee member of Communist Party of India (Maoist)

== Career ==
Chandramouli hails from Vadukapur, Karimnagar district of Andhra Pradesh. He joined in Communist Party of India (Marxist–Leninist) People's War Group in student life and involved with Left-wing politics for two decades. After the formation of CPI (Maoist) in 2004 he joined the party and became the member of Central Committee as well as Central Military Commission. Chandramouli was the head of the Eastern division of the People’s Liberation Guerrilla Army and also the secretary of Andhra Orissa Border (AOB) Special Zonal Committee. Number of cases of kidnapping and abduction of IAS officers were pending against him and a reward of 10 lakh rupees was upon his head. Chandramouli was known as Devanna alias Naveen inside the Party.

== Death ==
It is reported that on 27 December 2006, Chandramouli and his comrades were moving in the forest near Panasapally village of Visakhapatnam district. They were challenged by police and after a gun battle Chandramouli and his wife Jyothakka alias Devakka were killed. Revolutionary Telugu balladeer and Poet Gaddar and some Human rights activists alleged that they were murdered in a fake encounter and asked for judicial inquiry of it.
