= Ginugu Narsimha Reddy =

Indian Maoist politician

- Born: Cherlapallem
- Other name: Jampana

Ginugu Narsimha Reddy, commonly known by his nom de guerre Jampanna, is a Maoist politician and Central Committee member of the Communist Party of India (Maoist).

== Early life ==
Reddy hails from Cherlapalem village, in Thorrur mandal, Mahabubabad district of Telangana. In 1980 he passed from the Zilla Parishad Secondary School from his native village and entered in an Industrial training institute of Mallepally. In 1983. Reddy finished the course thereafter joined in far-left politics.

== Career ==
He became a member of the Communist Party of India (Marxist–Leninist) People's War in 1984. After formation of the CPI (Maoist) in 2004, Reddy became a member of the party's Central Regional Bureau and Central Military Commission. He was also in charge of the Odisha state committee and active in Kandhamal area. In 2006, he married Hinge Rajita, a post graduate from Osmania University. On 22 December 2017, Reddy along with his wife surrendered in Hyderabad to Telangana State Police. At the time of surrender he was the Central Committee member of his party. CPI (Maoist) spokesperson described his surrender as outright betrayal of Indian proletariat in their press statement.
