= People's Liberation Guerrilla Army (India) =

Maoist militant organisation in India

- जन मुक्ति सेना
- Leaders: Muppala Lakshmana Rao (until 2018); Nambala Keshava Rao † (2018 – 2025); Thippiri Tirupathi (surrendered) (2025 – 2026)
- Dates active: 2 December 2000 – present
- Allegiance: Communist Party of India (Maoist)
- Ideology: Communism; Marxism–Leninism–Maoism; Naxalism
- Political position: Far-left

The People's Liberation Guerrilla Army (PLGA) is the armed wing of the Communist Party of India (Maoist), a banned political organisation in India which aims to overthrow the Indian Government through protracted people's war.

== Background ==
The People's Liberation Guerrilla Army was founded on 2 December 2000 and known as the People's Guerrilla Army (PGA) by the Communist Party of India (Marxist–Leninist) People's War, also known as the People's War Group. The PLGA was founded on the first death anniversary of their three Central Committee members, who were killed in an encounter in Koyyuru. In 2004, when the People's War Group merged with the Maoist Communist Centre of India (MCCI) to form the Communist Party of India (Maoist), their respective armed wings also merged. Therefore, the People's Guerrilla Army (the military wing of the People's War Group) and the People's Liberation Guerrilla Army (the military wing of MCCI) combined to form the People's Liberation Guerrilla Army.

== Composition ==
The PLGA is controlled by the Central Military Commission of the CPI (Maoist). The analyses in September 2013, based on Maoists' intercepted communication, suggested that the estimated number of PLGA members had decreased (from 10,000−12,000) to 8,000−9,000. Recently in March 2014, Gautam Navlakha has claimed that the PLGA's strength did not decrease but has increased, however, the guerrilla zone has been geographically reduced. He writes that "the number of companies and platoons of PLGA increased from 8 companies and 13 platoons in 2008 to 12 companies and more than 25 platoons, plus a supply platoon in 2013." All the PLGA members are volunteers and they do not receive any wages. The count of Jan (People's) Militia is around 38,000 which is mostly composed of the tribal people who uses bows and arrows as their weapons and allegedly provide logistical support to the PLGA. During her visit to the Maoist's guerrilla zones few years back, Arundhati Roy noted that the PLGA was 45% female, but the recent analyses suggests that now the female comrades compose 60% of the PLGA. Now, the women commanders heads 20 of the 27 divisions in the Red corridor. It has a military intelligence wing, Central Instruction Team and the Central Action Team. Maoists manufacture 80% of their arms and looted others from the security forces. Kishenji was one of the commanders-in-chief of the PLGA who oversaw several attacks.

== Notable attacks ==
On 6 April 2010, an attack on Central Reserve Police Force (CRPF) in their camp in Dantewada district, Chhattisgarh killed 76 CRPF personnel. This is considered to be the biggest attack by the armed wing of the Maoist. On 25 May 2013, the PLGA targeted the convoy of Congress leaders in Chhattisgarh; twenty-seven people died, including Mahendra Karma, the founder of Salwa Judum. Karma had been the main target.

On 4 April 2021, Chhattisgarh Naxal attack, a group of an estimated 400 Maoists, armed with LMGs, had ambushed security forces deployed for a special operation, killing at least 22 personnel and injuring 30 others, besides decamping with over a dozen sophisticated arms.

== See also ==
- Operation Green Hunt
- People's Liberation Army, Nepal
- People's Liberation Army of Manipur
- People's Liberation Army
- People's Liberation Front (Sri Lanka)
- New People's Army
