= Madvi Hidma =

Indian Maoist (1980–2025)

- Born: 1981; Purvati, Sukma district, Madhya Pradesh (present–day Chhattisgarh, India)
- Died: 18 November 2025 (aged 44); Alluri Sitharama Raju district, Andhra Pradesh, India
- Cause of death: Gunshot wounds
- Organization: CPI (Maoist)
- Known for: Member of CPI (Maoist) and People's Liberation Guerrilla Army (India)
- Spouse: Raja alias Rajakka

Madvi Hidma (1981 – 18 November 2025) was an Indian Naxalite who at the time of his appointment was the youngest member of the Central Committee of the Communist Party of India (Maoist). Hidma was responsible for various attacks on the security forces in Chhattisgarh, including the April 2010 Maoist attack in Dantewada and 2013 Naxal attack in Darbha valley. He was on the National Investigation Agency's list of most wanted criminals. He had a bounty of more than ₹1 crore at the time of his death.

== Militant activities ==
Hidma was born in Puvarti village of south Sukma in the Indian state of Chhattisgarh, in 1981. He was also known as Hidmalu alias Santosh and was the face of the Maoists in Bastar. After completing his education up to class 10, he joined the Party and became a master strategist of military operations and guerrilla warfare. He reportedly received guerilla warfare training from a militant group in the Philippines.

Hidma was arrested in 2016 along with six other alleged naxals; at the time he was considered a low-level participant. About that time, Hidma became the area commander of People's Liberation Guerrilla Army Battalion No 1 and an active member of the Dandakaranya Special Zonal Committee of the CPI (Maoist), which operates in the Sukma, Dantewada and Bijapur areas. He was promoted to the Party's Central Committee as the youngest member. It is believed that Hidma was one of the masterminds behind a number of attacks on security personnel, including the April 2010 Maoist attack in Dantewada and the 2017 Sukma attack. All told he is cited as having been responsible for twenty-six separate attacks. Indian Agencies also declared a ₹45 lakh bounty on his head.

=== 2021 activities ===
Hidma was the objective of the security forces' planned 3 April 2021 attack on the Maoists; their intent had been to capture Madvi Hidma along with his associates. The planned attack of approximately 2,000 security forces, consisting of CRPF's specialised jungle warfare unit Commando Battalion for Resolute Action (CoBRA) combined with some of its regular battalions, and with units of the District Reserve Guard (DRG) of the Chhattisgarh Police was in turn ambushed by about 400 guerrillas. In the five-hour battle, there were twenty-three deaths among the security forces as per the police report: eight CRPF, eight from the district reserve group, and six special task force members. Also thirty-three others were listed as casualties, with thirteen being severely injured. In this battle the Maoists lost around fifteen members of the People's Liberation Guerrilla Army including a woman who was killed in the attack as per the police. The ambush occurred in the south Bastar forest where security intelligence had indicated that a major meeting of militants was to occur.

=== 2025 Karregutta encirclement ===
Beginning in April 2025 with Operation Black Forest, Hidma was the subject of much news attention as he was allegedly at the centre of the Central Reserve Police Force encirclement of over 1000 Maoist guerrillas in the Karregutta hills.

== Death ==
On 18 November 2025, security forces reportedly killed Madvi Hidma, his wife Madakam Raje (alias Rajakka), and four other Maoists in an encounter in the Maredumilli forest area of Alluri Sitharama Raju district, Andhra Pradesh. According to police authorities, the operation was part of an intelligence-based cordon-and-search after inputs about Maoist movement near the Andhra–Chhattisgarh–Odisha border; a gun battle ensued between roughly 6 am and 7 am, and all rebels, including Hidma, were killed.

However, the Maoist leadership and associated tribal activists rejected the official account, alleging that Hidma and others had been detained alive earlier and later executed, calling the encounter a "fake".
