= Singareni Karmika Samakya =

Militant trade union of coal miners

Sikasa
- Singareni Karmika Samakya
- Founded: 1980
- Dissolved: 2020s
- Location: India
- Key people: Vishwanath (Secretary), Rajab Ali (President)

The Singareni Karmika Samakya (Telugu: సింగరేణి కార్మిక సమాఖ్య, 'Singareni Workers Federation', abbreviated Sikasa, సికాస) was a militant trade union of coal miners in the Singareni coal fields. Sikasa is allegedly linked to the Communist Party of India (Maoist). Vishwanath is the secretary of Sikasa.

The union was founded in 1980. In 1981, it led a 56-day strike. hussain was the founding president of Sikasa. The union registered on 19 April 1982.

Sikasa held its first conference at Godavarikhani on 10–11 June 1982. 900 delegates and 330 fraternal delegates attended. The conference was preceded by police crackdowns, and the organisers of the conference were prohibited to take out any public procession.

Sikasa was allegedly connected to the Communist Party of India (Marxist-Leninist) People's War, functioning as both a legal and underground organization with linkages to the armed squads (dalams) of the party. Sikasa took up several causes of concern for the labourers at the coal fields, such as mine safety, improved working conditions and wages, widespread alcoholism, goondaism and exploitation of miners by contractors.

Between 1988 and 1992, Sikasa led a large number of strikes at the coal fields, paralysing operations at SCCL. As the SCCL came closer to bankruptcy, SIKASA's influence waned as police repression was intensified whilst the company was deferred for restructuring. Sikasa was banned in 1992.

In 2000, two Sikasa leaders were killed in a gun-fight with police in Adilabad district.

Sikasa was revived in 2004. The Andhra Pradesh state government decided to extend the ban on Sikasa in April 2006.
