= Sushil Roy =

Shusil Roy (25 December 1936 – 18 June 2014), popularly known by his nom de guerre Som alias Ashok, was a Maoist ideologue and senior Politburo member of the Communist Party of India (Maoist). He was the nephew of Indian freedom fighter Dinesh Gupta.

== Political activities ==
Roy joined in Communist Party of India in 1963 and led trade union movements in Bansdroni area of Kolkata. After the seventh Congress in 1964, he joined Communist Party of India (Marxist) and mobilized group of workers against the imperialist Vietnam War. In 1966, Roy was at the forefront of the food movement of West Bengal, facing police atrocities and became arrested. After the Naxalbari uprising in 1967, Roy left the CPI(M). In 1980 he became the general secretary of erstwhile Maoist Communist Centre of India (MCC) and the post he till kept in 1996. Roy also played a pivotal role in the unification of the M.C.C. with the Communist Party of India (Marxist–Leninist) People's War Group in 2004. He inaugurated the United CPI (Maoist). Roy was politically active in the state of Bihar and Jharkhand as Maoist ideologue and was considered to be the senior most leader of the CPI (Maoist).

== Arrest ==
Sushil Roy was arrested from Konnagar railway station in Hooghly district in 2005. He was initially sent in Presidency Jail, Kolkata and later granted bail. Afterward, arrested again in the same year by the Jharkhand Police and taken to Ranchi. He was released for treatment on bail bond in 2012 by the Jharkhand High Court on the ground of illness when his physical condition was highly deteriorated.

== Death ==
Roy was suffering from cancer since three years. He died at the age of 78 in Urology isolation ward in All India Institute of Medical Sciences, Delhi on 18 June 2014. His body was donated to AIIMS according to his wish.
