= Sadanala Ramakrishna =

Indian Maoist politician

Sadanala Ramakrishna is an Indian Maoist politician, senior leader of Communist Party of India (Maoist) and head of the Central Technical Committee of the party.

== Career ==
Ramkrishna hails from Antakkapet village, Karimnagar district of Andhra Pradesh. In 1976 he passed B.Tech in Mechanical Engineering from the National Institute of Technology, Warangal. He was a member of the Communist Party of India (Marxist–Leninist) People's War in student life and went underground. After the formation of CPI(Maoist) in 2004, Ramkrishna joined the Party and became the Secretary of Central Technical Committee, the arms making unit of it. He is an expert of making weapons and explosive specialist. He is also known as Techie Anna alias Santosh alias Vivek Sharma. Ramkrishna was arrested on 29 February 2012 at College Street area of Kolkata by a Special Task Force of West Bengal and Andhra Pradesh Police team.
