= B. Sudhakar =

Indian Maoist politician

B. Sudhakar is a Maoist leader and members of the Politburo of the Communist Party of India (Maoist).

== Career ==
Sudhakar alias Kiran hailing from Sarangapur village, Nirmal in states Adilabad district of Telangana State. Between 1982 and 1983, he had initially worked with Communist Party of India (Marxist–Leninist) People's War in Adilabad area and became Adilabad District Committee Secretary of the Group. Sudhakar has been a Central Committee Members of CPI (Maoist) since 2013. He became the Head of Publication division of Party. He was controlling several district holding charge of Chhattisgarh and Jharkhand states called Koyal Sankh Zone. Sudhakar is known as Satwaji and Oggu Buriyari inside the Party and carried a reward Rs 1 crore reward on his head. His wife Neelima alias Madhavi is also a Maoist activist, expert in computer operations, helped her husband plan and execute operations. They surrendered to Telangana Police on 11 February 2019. At the time of his surrender Sudhakar was a Politburo member of the party and in charge of Eastern Regional Bureau (ERB) and was active in the Bihar-Jharkhand Special Area Committee (BJSAC). His ex-wife, also Central Committee member Narmada Akka was reported to have been gunned-down during a fierce hour-long exchange of fire between the Maoists and State's police forces on 4 December 2012, near Hiker village, bordering Abujmarh of Chhattisgarh, in south Gadchiroli.
