= Krantikari Adivasi Mahila Sangathan =

Banned women's organisation based in India

- Abbreviation: KAMS
- Predecessor: Adivasi Mahila Sangathan
- Founder: Communist Party of India (Marxist–Leninist) People's War
- Dissolved: 31 March 2026
- Type: Voluntary association
- Legal status: Banned
- Parent organization: Communist Party of India (Maoist)

Krantikari Adivasi Mahila Sangathan (English: Revolutionary Adivasi Women's Organisation) was a banned women's organisation based in India. The Krantikari Adivasi Mahila Sangathan (KAMS) is a successor of the Adivasi Mahila Sanghathana (AMS). The foundation of the AMS was laid by the Maoists in 1986.

== Aims and objectives ==
KAMS has about 90,000 registered members, which ranks it amongst the top-most women's organisations in India in terms of registered members. Rahul Pandita, in 2011, claimed that the KAMS members number around 100,000.

The KAMS concentrates on addressing various social issues faced by women. The members of the KAMS crusades against the evil practises against women in the society like abducting the women and forcing them to marry against their will, polygyny, etc. The organisation's members have also campaigned against the adivasi tradition of forcing women to stay away from the village and take shelter in the forest during her menstruation period. The members also take a stand against the patriarchal mentality within their communities. In Dandakaranya, the adivasi men did not permit the women to sow seeds in the fields, but when the members of the KAMS approached the Communist Party of India (Maoist), the party held meetings (with the adivasis) to address the issue. While during the meets, the adivasi men have accepted their mistake and decided to refrain for such activities, they are yet to bring their resolution to practise. However, the CPI (Maoist) have ensured that the women are allowed to sow seed, raise vegetables, and construct check dams "on common lands, which belongs to the Jantana Sarkar" (people's government).

In Bastar, the KAMS members have rallied with hundreds in numbers to highlight the atrocities by the police, and a few times the attendance figure have been in thousands to "physically confront" the police.

Arundhati Roy writes,

"The very fact that the KAMS exists has radically changed traditional attitudes and eased many of the traditional forms of discrimination against women."

The organisation's members also addresses problems like forced migration and other political issues as well. Roy says that the KAMS has also been opposing mining in the Dandakaranya region.

== Alleged atrocities by Salwa Judum ==
A senior worker from the KAMS told Arundhati Roy that after facing "bestial sexual mutilation" and getting raped by the Salwa Judum members, several of the organisation's members have left the KAMS and joined the CPI (Maoist). A number of girls, who were not the members of the KAMS but witnessed the atrocities upon the KAMS members by the Salwa Judum members, have also joined the Maoists.

== Legal status ==
The KAMS was reported to be a frontal organisation of the Communist Party of India (Marxist–Leninist) People's War, and was thus banned. Arundhati Roy says that the Government of India can "wipe out" all the 90,000 members of the organisation, any time. She writes,

"I went with a very firm prejudice. That in an armed struggle, women were at the receiving end of violence. But I was disabused. I saw 48 percent of the guerrillas were women. They had come after watching their mothers and sisters being raped, houses burnt down, or to escape the patriarchy of their own society. The Krantikari Adivasi Mahila Sangathan (a women’s organization in Chhattisgarh state) has 90,000 members and is probably the biggest feminist movement in India. But they are all called terrorists and are liable to be shot on sight."

== See also ==
- Chetna Natya Manch
- Mahila Atma Raksha Samiti
- Nari Mukti Sangh
- National Federation of Indian Women
