= Amitabh Bagchi =

Indian maoist

- Known for: A cadre and senior Politburo member of the CPI (Maoist)
- Criminal status: Incarcerated

Amitabh Bagchi (born 1958) alias Anil alias Sumit da is an Indian Maoist ideologue and senior Politburo member of Communist Party of India (Maoist).

== Career ==
Bagchi hailed from Shivdas Bhaduri Street, Shyampukur area of Kolkata, West Bengal. His father's name is Ranjit Kumar Bagchi. He was a postgraduate student of Jadavpur University. Bagchi was active in undivided Bihar since the early 1990s in land movement in Jehanabad and Patna belt. He led the Naxalite movement in Bihar and is one of the founders of the erstwhile Central Organising Committee, Communist Party of India (Marxist–Leninist) Party Unity. Bagchi became the secretary of the Central Military Commission and Politburo member of CPI (Maoist). He has close relation with Kishanji at the time of Lalgarh movement in West Bengal. He was in charge of Eastern Regional Committee of the party, known there as Alokji and asked local leaders to tie up with Assamese tribal like Khasis, Rabhas and Garo people. Jharkhand Police arrested Bagchi and Tauhid Mulla alias Kartik, West Bengal State Committee member from the Hatia Patna Intercity Express at Ranchi on 19 August 2009. On 23 August 2010, he was sentenced to life imprisonment by a fast-track court. Bagchi is detained at present Birsa Munda Central Jail of Ranchi. After eight years in prison, his sentence was suspended. As part of Karimnagar case he was granted bail on 29 January 2024, but on 19 July this decision was overturned. On 27 August 2024, he went on hunger strike in Hyderabad Central Jail.
