= Baccha Prasad Singh =

Indian politician

Baccha Prasad Singh alias Balraj alias Arvind is an Indian Maoist politician and Politburo member of Communist Party of India (Maoist)

== Career Overview ==
Singh hails from Chapra district in the Indian state of Bihar. He is a science student of Patna University and had participated in Jayaprakash Narayan’s Civil liberty movement in the mid 70's before joining the Naxal movement. Singh had been active in the CPI (Maoist) since 1992. He became Party's regional commander of Chhapra Siwan area. Thereafter Singh became the member of Central Committee and Politburo. He was active to form mass organisations through a secret fraction committee, which comprised Maoist cadres within the mass outfit. Singh was arrested on 8 February 2010 in Naubasta area, Kanpur, Uttar Pradesh in a top-secret operation by Special Task Force (STF) of Uttar Pradesh Police. Another Maoist leader and intellectual Banshidhar alias Chintan were arrested along with him. Singh's wife Asha is also a Maoist activist. Asha was arrested when she came to meet their son in Gorakhpur.

== The Naxal Movement ==
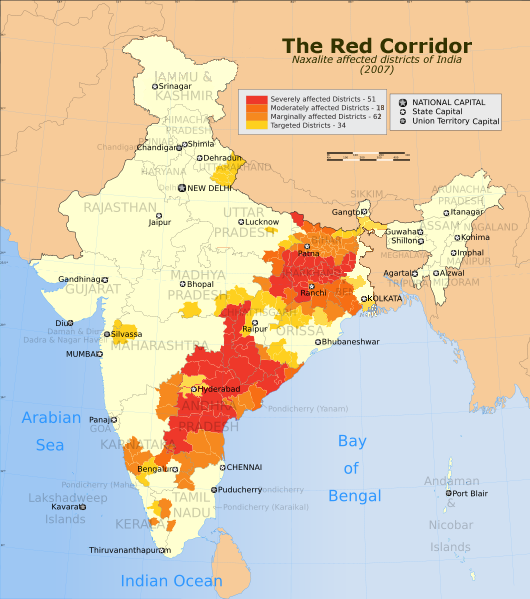
Map of Naxalite movement throughout India

The Naxal Movement began in the spring of 1967 with the Naxalbari Uprising. The name, Naxalbari, comes from the village of the original revolt, which was a movement of peasants and communist leaders against the oppressive state. The revolt began after a physical conflict between a landlord and a peasant over a financial dispute. India had gained its independence from Britain during this time period, but they still held many of the traditional colonial practices still in effect. Landlords were rewarded with land as a result of them collecting taxes, and then would rent the land to the peasants for half of their yield. This made it very difficult to own land, as well as expensive to rent or have access to. It was shown in the 1971 census that a majority of the land in India was owned by the top 4% of people, and that 60% of the population did not own land at all. This revolt inspired many others, and as a result it spread to less developed rural areas in Southern and Eastern India such as Chhattisgarh, Odisha, Andhra Pradesh, and Telangana. This movement is considered to be a far left communist movement with strong relation to Maoism. This was one of the first movements that Baccha Prasad Singh became a part of, and further inspired him to continue political activism. The Naxal movement still continues into the modern day, as many involved continue to fight for land rights in the 21st century.

== Communist Party of India (Maoist) ==
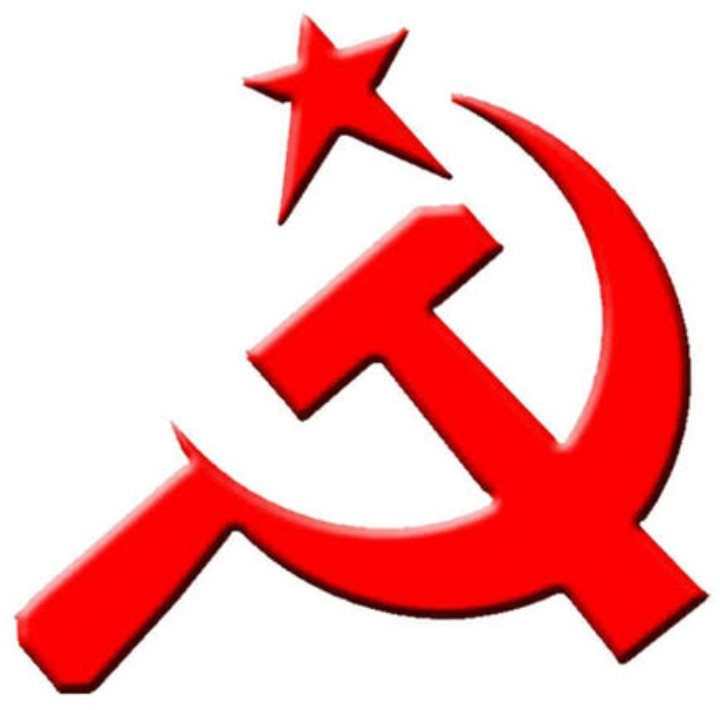
Communist Party of India Symbol

The Communist Party of India (CPI) was originally founded to combat colonialism and British Rule in 1925 to oppose the nationalist government in place. There were many different subgroups of this party including the maoists. Maoism is an alternate form of communism that was developed by Mao Tse Tung which is a "mighty mass movement against imperialism". The ideology is similar to communism, but it believes in seizing state power through means of violence, political alliances, and any means necessary. Maoists believe that it is essential to take the power away from the state in order to fully immerse itself into communism, and this is done through mobilization of people due to inequality within the current structure, to then commit acts of violence. The Communist Party of India (Maoist), is the largest group of communists that reside within India. It was founded in 2004, as part of a merger between many smaller groups, and the Communist Party of India (Marxist). The goal of the party is to overthrow the state with the “protracted people’s war”. Baccha Prasad Singh was a member of this party and ultimately lead to his arrest, as members who are found to be a part of this organization are considered to be “terrorists” by the Indian government. He aligned with their political belief in which the current state must be overthrown by any means necessary. Singh was quoted saying “With respect to revolutionary violence, we need to ask the important question of ‘who perpetuates violence in the first place?’; it is always the ruler. Violence is the only means of sustenance for the ruler or exploiter, it is a part of their character and existence”.

== Activism in Prison System ==
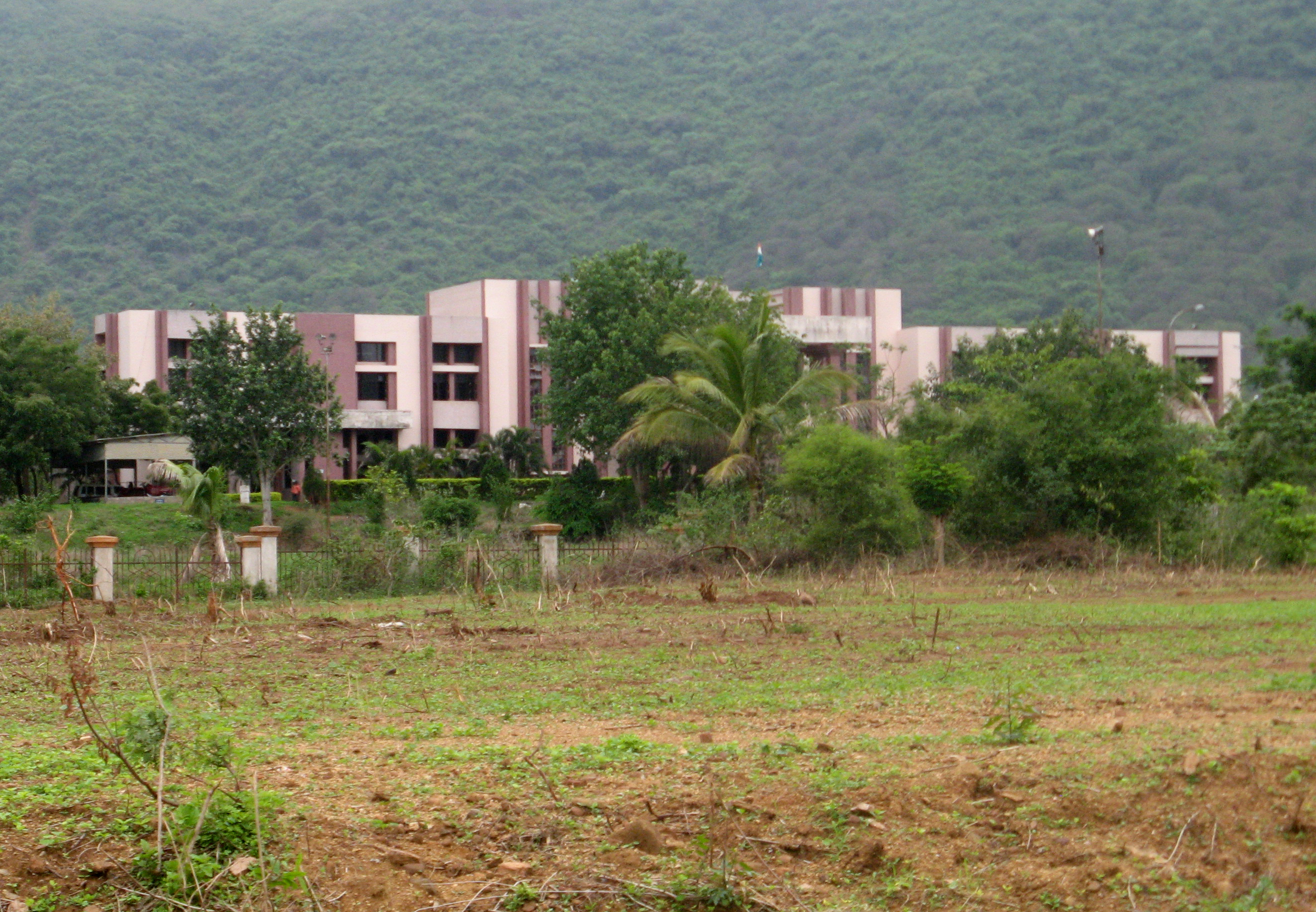
Visakhapatnam Jail complex where Singh was held

Baccha Prasad Singh was arrested on February 8, 2010, on allegations of ‘conspiracy to wage war against the State’ under various sections of the Unlawful Activities Act, 1967 for being a member of a banned organization. He was convicted on the charges and was sentenced to Visakhapatnam jail where he and other political prisoners were able to protest against the prison system. This group of political protesters was able to advocate for the rights of prisoners through agitations, court proceedings, media attention and petitions. They also fought for access to uncensored newspapers, access to books, transparent procedures with family or lawyers and the right to address media personnel. Not only was Singh advocating for himself and his fellow activists within the prison system, but for all incarcerated by the state. The treatment of prisoners was also a major emphasis of these protests within the prison led by Baccha Prasad Singh. “If a criminal justice system is to be based on the jurisprudence of reformation and correctional justice, reformatory steps have to be taken to improve the current prison conditions and recognition of basic human rights of prisoners”. There were many instances where Singh was tortured, harassed, and sleep deprived for over four days straight. In his experience he shares that much of the torture and harassment he received while in prison was mental, not physical. He was able to secure better conditions particularly for these political prisoners and sparked a discussion on what the prison system should look like.
