= Nari Mukti Sangh =

Women's organisation

- नारी मुक्ति संघ
- Abbreviation: NMS
- Formation: March 1990; 36 years ago
- Type: Voluntary association
- Purpose: • To fight against the exploitation, oppression and atrocities faced by women in society • To strive for the emancipation of India from semi-feudalism and semi-colonialism
- Region served: Bihar, Jharkhand, Chhattisgarh, Delhi, and West Bengal

Nari Mukti Sangh (Hindi pronunciation: [naːriː mʊkt̪ɪ sŋɡʱ]) (English: Women's Liberation Association) is a revolutionary women's organisation in India, with its focus of operations in Bihar and Jharkhand. The organisation was founded in March 1990, during a women's conference at Talekocha in Giridih, which was held to organise women, especially from Adivasi communities, to struggle against the exploitation, oppression and atrocities faced by them. An executive committee of the organisation was also elected at the conference. It had seven members, including its president, secretary and a treasurer. Presently, the Nari Mukti Sangh (NMS) draws considerable membership from the states of Bihar, Chhattisgarh, Jharkhand, West Bengal and Delhi.

This women's organisation in India is not to be confused with Nari Mukti Sangh (Tangail, Bangladesh).

== Ideology ==
The organisation is influenced from "(scientific) Marxism, Leninism and Maoism", and "believes that national problems can be solved through people's struggle and on the basis of independence, democracy, equality, women's liberation and socialism." The NMS describes India as a "semi-feudal" country, and avers that "without a radical transformation of the state, women liberation is not possible."

== Aims and activities ==
The organisation strives to generate "space to women’s voice" and motivates them to partake in "economic, political and social activity and decision making processes." The NMS's volunteers goes from village to village in Bihar and Jharkhand, and with the collaboration of local women, tries to mete out punishment to "perpetrators of sexual violence through people’s courts", and endeavours to "cordially straighten out the quarrels amongst family members." It also organises "kranti ka paathshaala" (school of revolution) to educate women, and so far has enabled thousands of women to read and write. Shoma Sen writes,

"Picketing at health centres where there are no doctors, at schools where teachers are absent, fighting for equitable distribution of food grains, for better wages and better remunerative prices, for equal wages for equal work between men and women, these tribal women’s organizations [Nari Mukti Sangh and Krantikari Adivasi Mahila Sangathan] are democratizing the processes of women’s political, social and economic activities, thus making development and democracy more meaningful to them."

The NMS has become a cynosure in Jharkhand for their campaign in Pirtand forests of Giridih district to save the trees. They educate villagers about the significance of trees for humans and wildlife, and make them conscious about the possibilities of future natural disasters if the trees would be continuously cut down ignorantly. They have also alarmed to penalise the offenders with a fine of ₹ 1,000 or face physical punishment.

The NMS is believed to be a "front organisation" of the Communist Party of India (Maoist) by the Ministry of Home Affairs, and is also viewed as an arm of the Maoist Coordination Center.

== See also ==
- Chetna Natya Manch
- Mahila Atma Raksha Samiti
- National Federation of Indian Women
