= 2004 Lahsuna massacre =

Naxal Atrocity in Bihar (2004)

- Location: 25.423212°N 85.032034°E; Lahsuna, Bihar, India
- Deaths: 4
- Convicted: 3

On 18 May 2004, four people were massacred at Lahsuna village in Bihar state of India. Members of the People's War Group, an outlawed naxal group, were accused of the crime. About 100 armed members of the group reportedly dragged the victims out of their homes and killed them for casting their votes in favour of Janata Dal (United). The victims were identified as Uday Paswan, Naga Paswan, Vijay Paswan, and Sarwan Paswan. In 2008, three members of the People's War Group were found guilty of the killings and sentenced to capital punishment by a court in Patna.
