= Kartam Joga =

Indian activist and prisoner

- Known for: 2010 arrest
- Political party: Communist Party of India (Maoist)

Kartam Joga alias Rajesh is an adivasi leader, who serves as a state committee member, technical department and military wing in-charge for the South Bastar division of the banned Communist Party of India (Maoist), CPI (Maoist). He was imprisoned in Chhattisgarh on suspicion of participating in the Tarmetla ambush in which 75 members of the Central Reserve Police Force were killed by CPI (Maoist) forces. Amnesty International named him a prisoner of conscience and described the charges against him as "fabricated". He was acquitted at his trial for lack of evidence. He also served as a Zilla Panchayat member from Jagargunda Constituency No. 11.

== Activism ==
Amnesty International states that in 2005, Joga was attacked by the Salwa Judum, a militia operating against armed Maoist groups. The group states that Adivasis (Indian aboriginal peoples) like Joga are particular targets for the Salwa Judum, and Joga dedicated himself to exposing alleged human rights abuses against them.

In 2007, Joga joined three other activists in petitioning India’s Supreme Court regarding human rights violations in Chhattisgargh, charging that the Salwa Judum had committed numerous human rights violations. The petition further argued that the Salwa Judum was sponsored and supplied by state security forces. In April 2008, the Court directed India’s National Human Rights Commission to investigate the charges; an NHRC report partially confirmed them eight months later, and Chhattisgarh authorities were ordered to help disband the Salwa Judum and to compensate the victims.

== Arrest ==
On 6 April 2010, seventy-five troops, primarily from the Central Reserve Police Force, were killed by Naxalite rebels in Chhattisgarh's Dantewada district. The Hindu described the incident as the "worst-ever Naxalite attack on the Central paramilitary force personnel". On 14 September, Joga was arrested in Dantewada and charged with involvement in the crime. He was 40 years old at the time of his arrest.

Amnesty International protested his arrest, arguing that Joga's philosophy had always been nonviolent and alleging that he had been detained in retaliation for his Supreme Court petition. AI named him a prisoner of conscience and called for his immediate release. A spokesman for the CPI (Maoist), described his arrest as "part of a sinister design".

Police responded that eyewitnesses had identified Joga at the scene; however, on 28 September, The Hindu reported that some of the witnesses of the police list claimed they had never even spoken with investigating officers. The article expressed skepticism of the police account, noting "for Mr. Joga to be identified, witnesses would have had to spot him at 300 metres, among 300 identically dressed Maoist fighters engaged in a pitched battle." Joga's son also supported his father's innocence, stating that his father was at home 100 kilometres (62 mi) away at the time of the attack.

Joga was acquitted along with nine other accused on 9 January 2013; judge Anita Deharia stated that the prosecution had been unable to provide evidence of guilt. Of the prosecution's 43 witnesses, almost all turned again it, leading the prosecutor to state to reporters, "the prosecution can’t do much if witnesses turn hostile."

== See also ==
- Binayak Sen
