= Gadchiroli Naxal bombing =

2019 terrorist attack by Naxalites in Gadchiroli, Maharashtra, India

- Location: Gadchiroli, Maharashtra, India
- Date: 1 May 2019
- Weapon: Bomb
- Deaths: 16
- Perpetrator: Naxalites

On 1 May 2019, a landmine killed 15 Indian police and their driver in Gadchiroli, state of Maharashtra, India. Police have blamed the blast on Maoists because they are common in the area. The attack took place after Maoist set 25 vehicles on fire.
