= Abdur Rehman Hashim Syed =

NIA Most Wanted criminal accused of terrorism

Major (Retd.) Pakistan army
- Nickname(s): Pasha, Major Abdur Rehman Hashim, Abdurrehman

Abdur Rehman Hashim Syed, also known as Pasha, is a retired Major in the Pakistan army, accused of involvement with terrorism. He is listed on the NIA Most Wanted list.

== Biography ==
Abdur-Rehman retired in 2007 from the Pakistan army as a Major. He worked closely with Lashkar-e-Taiba and had coordinated the activities of the Americani-Pakistani man based in Chicago, David Headley. Abdur-Rehman was arrested in 2009 in Pakistan on unspecified charges and later released.

An Associated Press story on 24 November 2009 said that five Pakistan army officers, including a retired brigadier and two active lieutenant colonels, had been detained for questioning in Pakistan. They had all been in telephone contact with Headley. But the next day, Pakistan military spokesman Athar Abbas said that "security agencies" had only detained a single former army major in connection with the FBI case.

== Accusations by the FBI ==
A joint FBI complaint against a Chicago man David Headley and Abdur Rehman charges Rehman with conspiracy in planning to attack the Danish newspaper Jyllands Posten and its employees.

Headley is accused of reporting to Ilyas Kashmiri, an Islamist militant commander associated with both Al Qaeda and Lashkar-e-Taiba, to conduct surveillance of public areas in Mumbai in preparation for the 2008 Mumbai attacks. Kashmiri was also a former Pakistani military officer. Kashmiri was killed in an American drone strike in Pakistan in June 2011.

== Accusations by the NIA ==
Another individual named in the FBI complaint as "LeT member A", a member of Lashkar-e-Taiba, gave instructions to Headley on which locations to scout for future attacks, including both the Danish newspaper and locations in India, such as the National Defense College in New Delhi. Indian intelligence officials believe that LeT member A is Sajid Mir, Lashkar's head of international operations and surveyed targets in India as a cricket fan. Sajid Mir was a ranking member of the Pakistani army until several years ago.

== See also ==
- List of fugitives from justice who disappeared
