= Haribhushan =

Indian maoist (died 2021)

Haribhushan (died 21 June 2021) alias Yapa Narayana was a Central Committee member of the CPI (Maoist), a banned political party in India.

== Career ==
Haribhushan was a member of the Koya tribe of Madagudem village of Gangaram mandal, Mahabubabad district in Telangana. He became the CPI (Maoist) state secretary of Telangana. While studying Intermediate at Narsampet he joined People War Group in 1995. Haribhushan went underground for more than three decades and led number of actions against the security forces of India. He was appointed a Central Committee member of Communist Party of India (Maoist).

He died from COVID-19 in Bastar forests of Chhattisgarh on 21 June 2021. Haribhushan carried a bounty of Rs 40 lakh on him at the time of death.
