= Anukul Chandra Naskar =

Indian maoist politician

Anukul Chandra Naskar (Bengali: অনুকূল চন্দ্র নস্কর) commonly known by his alias Paresh Da is an Indian Maoist politician and senior Politburo member of Communist Party of India (Maoist)

== Political life ==
Naskar hailed from Balia, Sonarpur area in South 24 Parganas district of West Bengal. He joined in Naxalite movement in 1967. In 1985, Naskar became the Central Committee member of Maoist Communist Centre of India (MCCI). After formation of the CPI (Maoist) in 2004, he was appointed as Politburo member of the party and in-charge of Northeast India wing including Assam, Arunachal Pradesh, Tripura and Jharkhand. Naskar worked to strengthen the party's cooperation with the various banned outfit like People's Liberation Army of Manipur (PLA) and United Liberation Front of Assam (ULFA). His wife Kavita Rava is also a maoist leader of Eastern region. A combined force of Assam Police, National Investigation Agency and intelligence branch of Andhra Pradesh Police arrested him on 9 May 2013 from Silchar in Cachar district of Assam.
