= Mahila Atma Raksha Samiti =

Indian women's organisation

The Mahila Atma Raksha Samiti (Bengali: মহিলা আত্মরক্ষা সমিতি, 'Women's Self-Defense Association, abbreviated MARS) was a women's movement in Bengal, India. MARS was a mass organisation linked to the Communist Party of India.

== Founding ==
MARS was founded in 1942, in the midst of the Second World War and on the eve of the Great Bengal famine. Calcutta was filled with women fleeing the famine in the countryside, becoming prey for sexual exploitation (either sent to military camps or lured or forced into prostitution in the city). The number of women in the brothels of Calcutta doubled. Incidents of sexual abuse or kidnappings of local women by American soldiers were taking place. In reaction to these developments, a group of communist women organised MARS. MARS had its origin in the Congress Mahila Sangha, formed in Calcutta in 1939 with the objective to prepare for defense against a Japanese occupation of Bengal. In 1941 the group had been joined by communist women, some recently released from prison.

== Leadership ==
Rani Mitra Dasgupta, Manikuntala Sen and Renu Chakravartty were key leaders of MARS. But the organisation also gathered prominent non-communist, liberal women like Rani Mahalanobis (wife of Prasanta Chandra Mahalanobis) and Leela Majumdar. Mahalanobis served as the president of MARS.

== Early struggles ==
MARS supported the struggle for Indian independence, instructed women in self-defense, warned against fascism, demanded release of political prisoners and sought to defend the population from starvation. The organisation mobilised relief activities for famine-stricken communities. On 17 March 1943 MARS mobilized 5,000 women to march to the Bengal Legislative Assembly in protest against price hikes on food items. The Calcutta march was followed by hunger marches in Dinajpur, Chittagong, Midnapur, Badarganj, Madaripur, Pabna and Bankura. MARS held its first conference in April 1943. It was presided by Mohini Devi and Ela Reid acted as the organising secretary.

MARS branches were set up in every district of Bengal and protests were mobilized across he province. By 1944 the movement counted 43,500 members. MARS would later play a key role in the Tebhaga struggle. "Tebhaga andolan Jodi prodeep hoye taahole MARS holo sholte pakano" (If the Tebhaga movement were a lamp, then the Mahila Atmaraksha Samiti (MARS) represented the rolling of the wick). "By the time Tebhaga started, a critical factor had been at work that had prepared both urban and rural women in Bengal for participation in peasant struggle. This was the experience of joint political work in an organized women's movement coordinated by MARS since 1942, and the sustained interaction of urban MARS and Communist Party (CP) activists with a devastated rural populace in the relief work and political marches during and after the Bengal famine of 1943. This historical experience of MARS had marked women's participation in Tebhaga as qualitatively different from those in the pre-Tebhaga agrarian movements such as the Tanka, Hattola and Adhiar in which peasant women had already become politically active by 1937, though not in such large numbers as in Tebhaga."

== After Partition ==
In 1947, the name of the organisation was changed to Paschim Bangha Mahila Atma Raksha Samti (পশ্চিমবঙ্গ মহিলা আত্মরক্ষা সমিতি, 'West Bengal Women's Self-Defense Association'). On 27 April 1949 MARS organised a rally in Calcutta in support of the hunger strike of political prisoners. Police opened fire on the demonstration at Bowbazar, killing six persons.

By April 1954 MARS claimed a membership of 18,000, out of whom the majority belonged to the peasantry or worked in jute mills. MARS took the initiative for the foundation of the National Federation of Indian Women two months later.

== See also ==
- Krantikari Adivasi Mahila Sangathan
- Nari Mukti Sangh
