= Mallojula Venugopal =

Political leader of India

Mallojula Venugopal Rao
- Born: Peddapalli in Karimnagar district, Telangana.
- Other names: Sonu Dada, Bhupati, Vivek, Abhay
- Education: B.Com.
- Occupation: Maoist Leader
- Years active: Join CPI (ML) People's War 1970 CPI (Maoist) Politburo Member 2004 to 2025 CPI (Maoist) Spokesperson 2011 to 2025 Join Mainstream 14 October 2025
- Organization: CPI (Maoist)
- Known for: Spokesperson and Politburo Member of CPI (Maoist), Writer, Ideologue, Surrendered Maoist Leader who give up arms and joined mainstream.
- Notable work: Books - Rago, Ye Jangal Hamara hai, Dankarnaya ka Itihas, Bastar ki Jan Sanskriti,
- Political party: Communist Party of India (Maoist)
- Movement: Maoist Movement, Naxalite, Adivasi
- Spouse: Vimala Chandra Sidam Alias Tarakka
- Parents: Mallojula Venkataiah (father); Madhuramma (mother)
- Relatives: Mallojula Koteshwara Rao, Mallojula Anjanna

Mallojula Venugopal Rao, commonly known by his nom de guerre Abhay (meaning "fearless"), Bhupati, Sonu is a Politburo and Central Military Commission member and Spokesperson of the Communist Party of India (Maoist), a banned Maoist insurgent communist party in India. He surrendered on October 14, 2025 at the Gadchiroli police headquarters in Maharashtra.

== Family ==
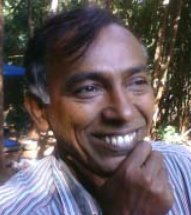
Koteshwara Rao Alias Kishanji Elder brother of Mallajola Venugopal rao

Venugopal is the younger brother of another Maoist guerrilla leader Kishenji. He was born into a poor Brahmin family in Peddapalli in Karimnagar district, Telangana which eked out a living on priesthood in nearby temples. His grandfather and father Mallojula Venkataiah were both Indian freedom fighters. Venugopal left his home for more than 30 years after joining Left wing extremism. His wife Tarakka, surrendered before the Maharashtra Chief Minister Devendra Fadnavis on 31 December 2024.

== Activities ==
Venugopal, a former Peoples War Group leader who is also known as Bhupati, Sonu, Master and Abhay was the Chief of the Maoist's Dandakaranya Special Zonal committee which includes Garchirouli area of state of Maharastra. He was appointed for the formation of a new guerrilla zone in the South India which would control areas on either side of Western Ghats, from Goa to Idukki in Kerala. He was also deputed as the official spokesperson of CPI (Maoist) after the death of Cherukuri Rajkumar (Azad) in 2010. Venugopal took charge of publication division of the party. Police intelligence suspect he is one of the brains behind the April 2010 Maoist attack in Dantewada that killed 76 jawans of Central Reserve Police Force. Both Andhra Pradesh and Chhattishgarh Police had declared hefty amounts on his head. After the death of Kisenji, his party appointed him to lead Lalgarh area movement in West Bengal against Operation Green Hunt.

He along with 60 Maoist cadres surrendered to Maharashtra police on October 15, 2025 citing disappointment in how the idea of the insurgency changed over the years.

== Writings of Mallojula Venugopal Rao ==
Bhupati has authored a number of books under different pen name. ‘Rago' (Parrot), a novel authored by him under the pen name Sadhana in 1998. Rago dwelt on the tribal women's conditions and the reasons why they joined the movement. Bhupati promoted the use of Gondi language and had a deep knowledge of the tribal culture. another book, Ye jungle hamara hai (This Jungle is Our), and Bastar ki Jan sanskuruti (Peoples culture of Bastar) also gave insights into tribal life. Bhupati also authored a document that spelled out the laws that would govern the Maoists utopia of Jantana Sarkar (Revolutionary peoples Committee).

== Surrender of Venugopal ==
The surrender of Mallojula Venugopal Rao (Bhupathi) in October 2025 was driven by a combination of personal, ideological, and strategic factors that together reflected the declining hold of Maoism in central India. Senior officials have confirmed their belief that a letter from a surrendered Maoist, known as Asin Rajaram ‘Anil,’ and his life partner Anju played a vital role in inspiring Sonu’s decision to surrender. and Also Bhupathi’s surrender was significantly influenced by the earlier defection of his wife, Tarakka, a senior Maoist leader who surrendered in January 2025 before the Maharashtra Chief Minister. Her decision established communication channels between Bhupathi and the police, building the trust needed for his own surrender. The loss of close comrades in police encounters and the isolation within the Maoist hierarchy further deepened his disillusionment.
