= Kishenji =

Maoist revolutionary (1954–2011)

Koteswara Rao
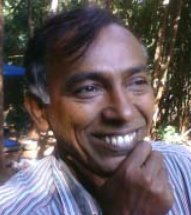
- Born: 26 November 1954; Peddapalli, Hyderabad State, India
- Died: 24 November 2011 (aged 56); West Bengal, India
- Cause of death: Shootout
- Other names: Kishenji, Bimal, Jayant, Kotanna, Murali, Pradip, Prahlad, Ramji, Sridhar and Vimal
- Organization: Communist Party of India (Maoist)
- Known for: A cadre, Politburo and Central Military Commission member, and reportedly, in charge of People's Liberation Guerrilla Army (PLGA) of CPI (Maoist)
- Criminal charges: Left wing extremism, Murder, Criminal Conspiracy
- Criminal status: Killed in Encounter
- Spouse: Sujata

Mallojula Koteswara Rao (26 November 1954 – 24 November 2011), commonly known by his nom de guerre Kishenji (Hindi pronunciation: [kɪʃndʒiː]), was an Indian Maoist leader who was a Politburo and Central Military Commission member of the Communist Party of India (Maoist), a banned terrorist organization in India; and also the party's military leader. He was seen as "The Face of the Maoism in India".

== Early life and family ==
Kishenji was born into a poor family in Peddapalli (in the district of Karimnagar, Telangana) which eked out a living on priesthood in nearby temples. His classmates remember him as "Kotanna", and describe him as being "like a live wire and full of ideas during school days". In 1973, after graduating from SSR College at Warangal, he shifted to Hyderabad to study LL.B. at Osmania University. His mother, Madhuramma, used to call him by the nickname, "Koti". On a night in 1974, when he was leaving home to go underground and join the Maoists, his last words to his mother were, "police are looking for me and so from today, do not even think about whether I am dead or alive." Going after Kishenji, the police knocked down the Mallojula family's house, during the "search operations" in 1982. After Madhuramma heard about the demise of her son, she burst into tears, and her first words were:

"I thought you [Kishenji] would wipe away the tears from the eyes of several mothers by staying away from us. But this is a big shock to me, as I have not seen him [Kishenji] for the last 33 years after he left home."

His elder brother, Anjaneyulu, who is a retired employee of a cooperative bank, says that after joining the communists, Kishenji had not done any favour to his own family, but restlessly struggled for the well-being of "poor and downtrodden" people. His younger brother, Mallujola Venugopal Rao is also a Maoist cadre for over 30 years, and a Politburo member of CPI (Maoist). For over three decades, Kishenji and Venugopal did not have any communication with their mother. Kishenji married Maisa alias Sujata, who was also a Maoist, and the family is now worried about her whereabouts. Anjaneyulu asked the government to give his body to the family as the family wished to view him for "the last time" and carry out the funeral ceremony.

== Early political life ==
Kishenji did not view the independence from British rule to be genuine freedom, rather he believed that it has only strengthened the rich ruling class and brought no meaningful change in the life of poor and tribal people. His classmates says that he had a strong aversion towards feudalism. His political career launched when he joined the Telangana movement and volunteered as a member of the Telangana Sangarsh Samiti. He subsequently founded the Radical Students Union (RSU) in Telangana. He became a full-time member of the People's War Group in 1974. He decided to go "underground" to participate in the revolution when the Emergency was declared in 1975. Prime amongst his motivations were the revolutionary writer, Varavara Rao, who launched the Revolutionary Writers' Association, and the then "political atmosphere and the progressive environment" in which he was raised. Poets like Sri Sri, Kaloji Narayana Rao and Varavara Rao were often invited by him, at his house.

The peasant movement of Karimnagar's Jagitial and Siricilla in 1977 were also overseen by Kishenji, in which more than 60,000 farmers participated, resulting in a "peasant uprising" throughout India. The uprising was viewed as anti–feudal in nature, and is evaluated to have been the substratum for the establishment of the People's War Group few years later by Kondapalli Seetharamaiah. He was viewed as the joint founder of the People's War Group, and had worked as its Politburo member.

== Guerrilla life ==
Kishenji was said to be able to communicate in at least six languages including English, Telugu, Bengali, Hindi, Santhali and Oriya, and was described as "soft-spoken", "well-read", and "IT-savvy", and "media-friendly".

Clearly, he [Home Secretary of India] doesn't know the basics of our philosophy. To win a war, you need to know your enemy. Our position is diametrically opposite to China. I thought Chidambaram and Pillai were my competition, but never imagined I have such low-standard enemies. They are flashing swords in the air. Victory will be ours.

He used several assumed names, including Murali, Pradip, Prahlad, and Vimal. From 1982 to 1986, he strengthened the movement in Andhra Pradesh as the state secretary of the Communist Party of India (Marxist-Leninist) People's War, and later-on lead the Dandakaranya unit of the outfit from 1986 to 1992. From 1992 to 2000, he worked in North East, and reportedly, successfully collaborated with the rebels operating in the region.

After spending decades, in the Naxal belt of Maharashtra and Chhattisgarh, he relocated to West Bengal around 2000, to boost the armed struggle in the region. His influence rode high in the tribal hinterland of West Bengal, often known as Jungalmahal, that borders Jharkhand. He strengthened the ultra-leftist political party in West Bengal and rose as a momentous member of the Eastern Region Bureau of the party. He had played a crucial part in the merger of the People's War Group (PWG) with the Maoist Communist Centre of India (MCCI) in 2004, which resulted in the emergence of the Communist Party of India (Maoist); and he was the Central Military Commission member of the party since its formation.

He planned and executed several attacks on the State's armed forces. In 2010, he planned and directed a furious attack on the Silda camp in West Bengal, and in which 24 paramilitary personnel of Eastern Frontier Rifles (EFR) were gunned down, and later, described the massacre as the Maoists' "Operation Peace Hunt" in answer to the Indian government's "Operation Green Hunt." However, the attack is believed to have been executed on the ground level by "women commanders", one of whom was captured later from West Midnapore. After the raid at the paramilitary force camp at West Midnapore, he said to journalists:

"We have not started it (violence) and we will not stop it first. Let us see whether the central government is honest about a solution and we will definitely co-operate.... This is the answer to Chidambaram's 'Operation Green Hunt' and unless the Centre stop this inhuman military operation, we are going to answer the Centre this way only."

During his campaign in West Bengal, he had been accused of "sidelining" native leaders who supposedly "fell out with him", but later in December 2010, the arrested Maoists stated that there was "no rift" between West Bengal State Committee members and Kishenji.

Kishenji's sympathisers and comrades believed that he would never be arrested or shot, that however, was proved to be a false assumption.

== Views on Jyoti Basu and Buddhadeb Bhattacharjee ==
In January 2010, Kishenji wrote and faxed an 8-page paper to media, in which he held Jyoti Basu as responsible for the "underdevelopment" and "resulting unrest" in the forest region districts of West Bengal. He even questioned Basu's basic understanding of communism. He wrote:

"The main culprit is Jyoti Basu. He is a negative model of communist movement in the whole country. This is why Basu is such a favourite of the bourgeois zamindars.... This is why the whole ruling class of the country comes to visit him if he is ill."

He also considered Bhattacharjee's strategies to be faulty and responsible for the subsequent violence in West Bengal's forest dominated territories; and even planned to eliminate him at West Midnapore, in 2008.

== Views on Islamic upsurge ==
Kishenji said, "The Islamic upsurge should not be opposed as it is basically anti-US and anti-imperialist in nature. We, therefore, want it to grow".

== Views on Lashkar-e-Taiba ==
Kishenji had described the policies of Lashkar-e-Taiba (LeT) as "wrong" and "anti-people" in nature; though he said that they may consider backing up a few of their demands, if LeT will halt its "terrorist acts".

== Death ==
Kishenji was killed on 24 November 2011, in an operation by Commando Battalion for Resolute Action (CoBRA), assisted by over 1,000 personnel of Central Reserve Police Force, who cordoned off a forested area in West Midnapore district near the Bengal-Jharkhand border. He was killed at around 9:30 pm. The body was later identified by former associate Soma Mandi and by Atindranath Dutta, a police officer who had been held captive by the group in 2009. The arrested Maoist, Telugu Deepak, was also brought to West Midnapore for the body's identification. The body of Kishenji was first taken to Jhargram hospital morgue and then to the Midnapore police morgue for post-mortem examination.

After confirmation of the death of Kishenji, some regional ultra-radical organisations, other political personnel, and family members claimed that Kishenji had been captured and later killed while in CRPF custody, an allegation dismissed by then CRPF Director-General K. Vijay Kumar, who said it was "an absolutely clean operation." The radical Telugu poet Varavara Rao has claimed that "the story of an encounter was a fabrication", and described Kishenji's killing as a "political murder." After the encounter, police were able to produce only Kishenji's body, which has raised some suspicion, because Kishenji was always surrounded by bodyguards and other associates. Gurudas Dasgupta, The Communist Party of India (Marxist-Leninist) leaders Raj Kumar Singh, Samajwadi Party leader Mohan Singh, human rights activist and negotiator appointed by Mamata Banerjee, Choton Das, and Krishna Adhikari shared the same view and demanded an unbiased independent judicial inquiry from the India government officials. Sitaram Yechury refrained from sharing his point of view on the questions and accusations rising after the encounter of Kishenji; he said that "the development has put the security forces a step ahead of the Maoists as far as law and order is concerned."

From the family, Kishenji's niece Deepa Rao, accompanied by Varavara Rao, identified the militant body and bringing it to his hometown. After seeing her uncle's body, Deepa accused the CRPF of horribly torturing him. After viewing Kishenji's body, Varavara Rao told media:

"I have seen him (Kishenji) several times since 1991. During the last 43 years I have seen a lot of dead bodies but none like this. They cut him, burnt him, then pumped bullets into him. There isn't a single part of his body without an injury. They kept him in custody for 24 hours and tortured him."

The Hindu noted that despite close monitoring and scrutinising of the visitors by police force at every single point of entry into Peddapalli including local bus stops and railway platforms, "thousands" of people approached Kishenji's house to offer condolences to his family, shouting slogans like "Amar rahe Kishenji", "Kishenji Amar hai" and "Johar Amarajeevi Kishenji". A large number of Maoists' sympathisers, representatives of a number of people's organisations, civil liberties activists, artists, singers including Gaddar, and revolutionary writers including Varavara Rao attended the funeral ceremony of Kishenji, and paid the last "Lal Salam" to the Maoists' leader. His classmates and friends were also present at his house to comfort his grieving mother. While Anjaneyulu lit the "funeral pyre", the statement from CPI (Maoist)'s Central Committee, in which the party has accused that Kishenji was assassinated in a fake encounter, was read out by Varavara Rao. Also, maintaining the view-point that Kishenji was killed in a scripted fake encounter, Varavara Rao described the West Bengal government's actions as "fascist" in nature by pointing towards the encounters in the state, and even accused the Trinamool Congress of pressurising the doctors to declare that Kishenji was not killed in a fake encounter. A few days later, on the morning of 7 December 2011, the photographs of Kishenji's body before the post-mortem procedure were leaked online.

During a rally organized by the Association for Protection of Democratic Rights (APDR) at Kolkata, Varavara Rao announced that the Maoist sympathizers are consulting their lawyers to file murder charges "against those involved in the encounter" of Kishenji, under Section 302 of IPC. Kishenji's mother also wrote a letter to the Chief Justice of the Calcutta High Court, requesting a juridical inquisition of his encounter. She said,"My son believed in something and he was murdered for that. I want to know how and who are the people behind his killing. I will go to the Calcutta High Court and, if necessary, to the Supreme Court to find out why they killed him like that." The former National Commissioner for Scheduled Castes and Tribes, B. D. Sharma, has described Kishenji's encounter as a "cold-blooded murder and planned assassination."

...."on the back side of the head, part of [the] skull [and] brain [was] missing"; the right eye had come out of the socket; the lower jaw was "missing"; there were four stab wounds on the face; knife injuries were observed on the throat; there were hand fractures and two bullet injuries under one of the arms; "one-third of the left hand index finger was removed"; there were signs of enrooted bullets through the lungs; the right knee was hacked; the foot of the left leg was "totally burnt"; in all, "there were more than 30 bayonet-like cut injuries on the front of the body". And, while there were "bullet, sharp cuts and burn injuries", "surprisingly" there were "no injury marks on his [Kishenji's] shirt and pant corresponding to [those on] his body parts".... "the extent of the damage caused to the body against the rather undisturbed surrounding of the spot where the body lay raises our suspicion about the official version". Indeed, "right next to where his [Kishenji's] body lay on the ground is a termite hill" that "remains undamaged by all the alleged exchange of fire". Indeed, even nearby, "not a single termite hill was damaged and [there was] no visible sign of burn or fire due to heavy rifle and mortar firing!"

— Coordination of Democratic Rights Organisations

It was essentially good intelligence work and pinpoint information that allowed us to get Kishenji. We got to know of his whereabouts and activities from various sources, including a recently arrested Maoist leader, and with the precise information we could surround him and his aides. It also helped that the operations took place in daylight......Kishenji's death will be of particular significance to the Maoist movement in West Bengal. Kishenji's death will have an all-India ramification. I think it will be quite a while before the Maoists are able to regroup in West Bengal. They will, of course, try to reorganise and find a replacement for Kishenji, but their area of operations will be reduced even further..

— Manoj Verma, Superintendent of Police, Counter Insurgency Force

=== Reaction of interlocutors appointed by the Indian government ===
The interlocutors appointed by the government to discover the opportunities to initiate the peace process, questioned the timing of the encounter of Kishenji, highlighting the political atmosphere during that time as an excuse to their viewpoint. After the news of Kishenji's encounter was aired, a senior interlocutor even stated that the government has "failed" to grasp the opening opportunity for a cease-fire. He said to The Hindu:

"One cannot expect them (the Maoists) to come to the negotiating table at gun-point. At a time when we have been trying to arrive at an understanding for a cease-fire, it is as if they (the Maoists) are being told to either surrender or get killed."

The interlocutors concluded that there is absolutely no possibility of "peace talks" at all, unless the government slows down its counter-insurgency operations in the Red corridor. After the encounter, the interlocutors decided to resign from the designated duty. Mamata Banerjee requested them to reconsider their decision, but they did quit stating, "The prevailing situation in Junglemahal does not allow us [interlocutors] to carry forward the peace talks. We have expressed our helplessness and inability to the chief minister of West Bengal." Varavara Rao also raised concern over Mamata Banerjee's sincerity to look forward to the cease-fire and peace process.

== Maoists' response ==
The Maoists have said to media that about one month before Kishenji's encounter, the Central Committee of the party was getting inputs that "he was in touch with the political leadership of Junglemahal and was working towards a truce with the government." The Maoists further claimed that Kishenji was assassinated insanely in a fake encounter, and said to journalists that as a consequence of the event, they hold back partaking in any "peace initiative," and demanded the "filing of a murder case against those involved" in the assassination of their comrade. The CPI (Maoist)'s West Bengal State Committee member and spokesperson, Akash gave a phone call to media personnel of the Press Trust of India from an unrevealed location and said:

"He [Kishenji] was arrested when our people were present nearby and then murdered in cold blood. We demand an independent investigation into the killing of our leader."

"It was a fake encounter. Our beloved leader comrade Kishenji was caught by the police, brutally tortured and killed by the enemy with the help of coverts."

— Ganapathy

It had been suggested that Sabyasachi Panda's laptop, which was seized only a little time back before Kishenji's encounter from Panda's "hideout" in Odisha, was closely examined by experts at Delhi, leading them to locate Kishenji, and the CRPF did the "anti-Maoist operation against Mallojula Koteshwar Rao". However, Foreign Policy in December 2011 stated that the representatives of intelligence agencies has specified that it was Manasha Ram Hembram alias Bikash, one of the senior-most Maoist leaders from West Bengal, who treacherously gave information about Kishenji to the armed forces, in exchange of ₹ 2 million. But, after carrying out an "internal probe", the CPI (Maoist) by early 2013, is reported to have concluded that it was Suchitra Mahato who passed on the information about Kishenji's locations to the Trinamool Congress and "joint security forces", which resulted in his encounter. A CPI (Maoist)'s West Bengal State Committee member told media that "Kishan was camping in a remote village on the Bengal-Jharkhand border with Suchitra and other rebel leaders such as Bikash and Akash. Suchitra had repeatedly asked Kishan to visit the villages of Binpur, saying the organisation had become weak there and Trinamul was trying to win over the residents." Bikash urged Kishanji to refrain from going to Binpur as the regions of Binpur which Kishenji has previously visited were under raids from the armed forces; and when Kishenji was going to Binpur with Suchitra, accompanied by only five comrades, Akash also requested him to move into the region with more of them, but Suchitra convinced them, stating that she and "her men would take care of the 53-year-old politburo member's security." In their "probe report", the Maoists have also stated that Suchitra had been tactically switching on Kishenji's mobile which he had always been turning off while sleeping, in order to let it be traced by the police force. The Maoists had once brought to Kishenji's knowledge that a few of the State Committee members have noticed that his mobile phone occasionally rings during night, and he also found the news as odd.

According to The Indian Express, the report from CPI (Maoist)'s "internal inquiry commission" reveals that the Central Committee of the party has vowed to take revenge from the persons responsible for Kishenji's encounter (including Mamata Banerjee), "when the time comes."

The CPI (Maoist)'s Politburo member, Katakam Sudarshan alias "Anand", who is described by the Indian police personnel as a "soft spoken" person, an "orthodox" Maoist, a "hardline strategist", and endorses that the political power grows out of the barrel of a gun, is believed by Indian home department officials to take up Kishenji's role as the chief of eastern regional bureau of the CPI (Maoist). The experienced Maoist cadre Kadri Satyanarayan alias "Kosa", a former secretary of Dandakaranya Special Zone Committee and former "military commander" of CPI (Maoist), who is described by one of the CRPF officials as "very good with arms and ammunition and a master at guerrilla warfare," is believed by the Indian officials to have been appointed by the Central Regional Bureau of the party to "fill the void" left after Kishenji's elimination in the ongoing Maoist movement in the country.

The CPI (Maoist) has also published the biography of Kishenji, reportedly titled "Comrade Kishenji", urging the Maoist cadres to "lead the war by following the footsteps of Comrade Kotanna (Kishenji)" rather than mourning over the demise of eminent leaders. In the book, the Maoists have described the elimination of Kishenji as a "big loss to the naxal community", and held Sonia Gandhi, Manmohan Singh, P. Chidambaram, Pranab Mukherjee and Jairam Ramesh as responsible for his encounter.

"His [Kishenji's] decades long struggle against the Indian establishment in serving his people to ensure their survival will be written in gold in the history of the sons and daughters of the soil of India who are treated as sub-human species and facing brute force and State terrorism to crush them denying their basic rights and privileges."

— Abhizeet Asom

The Communist Party of the Philippines, Maoist Communist Party (Italy), Association for Proletarian Solidarity – Italy, Maoist Communist Party of France, Maoist Communist Party of Manipur, Party of the Committees to Support Resistance – for Communism (CARC), Revolutionary Communist Party of Canada, Struggling Workers Union – Italy, Socialist Party of Malaysia, Communist Union of Obrero (MLM) – Colombia, Revolutionary Cultural-Intellectual Forum – Kathmandu, Nepal, Class Youth League of Mexico, Reconstruction Committee of Communist Party of Ecuador, Communist Youth League – Austria, Brazilian Center for Solidarity of the Peoples and Struggle for Peace, and Communist Party of Greece (Marxist–Leninist) have condemned the encounter of Kishenji and expressed condolence towards the CPI (Maoist).

While Kishenji's death marks a serious blow to the Maoist movement in India, the former national security advisor, M. K. Narayanan, believes that the event will not halt the Maoist movement in the country.
