= Ravi Sharma (Maoist politician) =

Indian politician

Ravi Sharma is an Indian Maoist politician and Central Committee member of the Communist Party of India (Maoist)

== Education ==
Sharma hails from Mahbubnagar district of Indian state of Telangana. He is a postgraduate in Agriculture and earlier worked as a scientist with the Dr. Rajendra Prasad Central Agriculture University in Bihar. He was pursuing Ph.D from the Indian Council of Agricultural Research in Delhi.

== Political career ==
Since 1999 Sharma and his wife B. Anuradha alias Rajitha led the Maoist movement in Bihar and Jharkhand. He was one of the head of party's military group and in charge of the Bihar-Jharkhand Special Area Committee of the party. He looked after recruitment cell as well as training of party cadre as a member of the Sub-Committee of Political Education, a Maoist ideological wing. Sharma's wife Anuradha, came from West Godavari, left her job of Nationalised Bank in Hyderabad in 1988 and joined CPI (Maoist). She went to Bihar in 2007 and became head of Nari Mukti Sangha, the women's wing of the party. According to the police the couple were responsible for Naxal violence in Bihar and Jharkhand. Sharma is known inside the party as Arjun alias Mahesh alias Ashok. On 10 October 2009, Sharma along with his wife were arrested under Ichak police station from Hazaribagh Wildlife Sanctuary. The Couple were sent to Jai Prakash Narayan Central Jail near Hazaribagh.
