= Thippiri Tirupathi =

Communist Party of India Leader

3rd General Secretary of the Communist Party of India (Maoist)
- In office September 2025 – 22 February 2026
- Preceded by: Nambala Keshava Rao
- Succeeded by: none

Personal details
- Born: 1963 (age 62–63) Ambedkar Nagar, Karimnagar district, Andhra State, India
- Party: Communist Party of India (Maoist)

Thippiri Tirupathi alias Devuji is a former Indian Maoist leader and general secretary of the Communist Party of India (Maoist).

== Political life ==
Tirupathi hails from Korutla town, Ambedkar Nagar, Jagtial district in the Indian state of Telangana. His father name is Venkat Narsaiah, belongs to Mala caste community. He joined the Maoist movement in 1983 and gradually rose to the top position acted as operator of South India zone. Tirupathi's name is in the National Investigation Agency's (NIA) most wanted list, with a bounty of Rs. 10 lakh. He is known as Sanjeev, Chetan, Ramesh, Sudharshan, Devanna inside the Party. He edited an underground military publication of the party, Awami Jung, which carried articles about the achievements of the CPI (Maoist). Tirupathi, being a senior member of Central Military Commission, guides the Central Regional Bureau (CRB) of CPI (Maoist) in military issues. Police believe that Tirupathi is one of the mastermind of April 2010 Maoist attack in Dantewada and killing of 74 jawans of the Central Reserve Police Force. After the death of Nambala Keshava Rao, Tirupathi was appointed as the General Secretary of Communist Party of India (Maoist) in September 2025.

== Surrender ==
On 22 February 2026, he surrendered to the Telangana Police along with another senior Central Committee member Malla Raji Reddy and 20 other cadres in Mulugu district, Telangana.

== After surrender ==
He took the Telangana Law Common Entrance Test, 2026 and started studying for the LL.B Five Year Degree Course.
