= April 2010 Maoist attack in Dantewada =

Ambush of law enforcement by Naxalite-Maoist insurgents in Chhattisgarh, India

Coordinates: 18°17′43″N 81°11′01″E

Dantewada Ambush
- Part of the Naxalite-Maoist insurgency
Date	6 April 2010
Location	Chintalnar, Dantewada District, Chhattisgarh, India
Result	Naxalite victory: Ambush successful

Belligerents
Communist Party of India (Maoist)	India: Chhattisgarh

Units involved
3 Companies of the Dandakaranya Special Zonal Committee	Central Reserve Police Force: Chhattisgarh Police

Strength
300–1,000 insurgents	86–200 policemen

Casualties and losses
8 killed	76 killed 8 wounded

The April 2010 Dantewada Maoist attack was an 6 April 2010 ambush by Naxalite-Maoist insurgents from the Communist Party of India (Maoist) near Chintalnar village in Dantewada district, Chhattisgarh, India, leading to the killing of 76 CRPF policemen and 8 Maoists — the deadliest attack by the Maoists on Indian security forces.

The attack occurred when over 85 officers from the central paramilitary force Central Reserve Police Force (CRPF) and a local police group were conducting an area domination exercise in the Bastar tribal region of the Indian state of Chhattisgarh.

Ambush style attacks on Indian Police have been repeated since by Maoist militants.

== Background ==
Indian Maoists, or Naxals, were named after a 1967 leftists armed uprising against the Indian state originating in the village of Naxalbari in West Bengal. The movement had its intellectual roots in the doctrines of Mao Zedong promoting armed overthrow of the ruling class by the peasant and worker class. The original movement had weakened considerably by the 1970s, but it started spreading across a swathe of India's poorest districts, the so-called red corridor, a tribal belt running through the mainly Santhal regions of West Bengal, Jharkhand, Odisha, and then through the Gond and other tribal regions of Andhra Pradesh, into the Bastar region of Chhattisgarh and Maharashtra.

Two separate radical leftist groups, the Communist Party of India (Marxist–Leninist) People's War party (also known as the People's War Group) and the Maoist Communist Centre merged to form the Communist Party of India (Maoist) in September 2004. This happened within four months of the end of India's centre-right nationalist BJP-led NDA government and the start of the Congress-led UPA government in alliance with the Left Front (a grouping of India's leftist and communist parties). After the 2009 Indian general election, the Congress-led UPA managed to come to power at the centre without the support of the Left Front or communist parties. Within one month of that election, the Government of India declared the CPI (Maoist) as a designated terrorist organization under the Unlawful Activities (Prevention) Act. A few months later Prime Minister Manmohan Singh said that the Maoists pose the biggest internal threat to India's security and their activities had intensified over the previous years.

The insurgency points to the commercial development and industrialization in forest regions that are home to India's tribal communities, resulting in loss of land or livelihood as justification for its activities. These regions are noted for lack of development; at 30% literacy, the Dantewada district has the lowest literacy rate in the nation.

Before the incident at Chintalnar in Dantewada, in March 2007, Maoists were also blamed for the killing of 55 policemen in Chhattisgarh. In the February 2010 Silda camp attack, at least 25 policemen were killed in western West Bengal when their camp came under fire. In response to the growing insurgency, Indian paramilitary forces launched a large-scale offensive, popularly known as Operation Green Hunt, against the rebels along the red corridor which includes the Dantewada district.

Dantewada district is a "remote, sparsely-populated and under-developed" area which is regarded as the "nerve center" of the Maoists. About 66% of the district's population consists of tribal peoples (known as adivasis). In 2006, The Economist noted that Naxalite-Maoist insurgency is "most intense" in the Dantewada district and linked the popularity of the Maoists among the local populace to the region's lack of development. Indian forces and Maoist insurgents had been involved in numerous skirmishes in the Dantewada district since 2007. In September 2009, Commando Battalion for Resolute Action (COBRA) personnel and state police forces killed about 30 Maoist rebels in Dantewada during an intense gun-battle.

== Ambush ==
According to police reports, 300 fighters initially attacked a convoy of the paramilitary Central Reserve Police Force (CRPF) in the Talmetla area as they were returning from an operation. India's home minister P Chidambaram said that it appeared that the forces had "walked" into a rebel ambush by returning to the police base via the same route they had come. "Something has gone very wrong. They seem to have walked into a trap set by the [Maoists] and casualties are quite high," he said. Police sources reported that the Maoists triggered two land mines targeting the mine protected vehicles carrying the jawans. The attack took place when the CRPF unit belonging to the 62 Battalion entered the forest for an operation between 6 and 7 am and were ambushed by the Maoists.

=== Repercussions ===
The attacks were seen as a setback for efforts to clear the eastern regions of the Naxals in order to open up areas rich in iron, coal, bauxite, and manganese to investment. NMDC Ltd. operates its biggest iron-ore mine, while Essar Steel Ltd. plan a $1.5 billion steel plant in the district. The Associated Chambers of Commerce and Industry of India (ASSOCHAM) in a statement said "If such activities continue, investments do get impacted and even committed investments would fly away."

CPI (Maoist) activist Kartam Joga was arrested in connection with the attacks on 14 September 2010. His arrest has been controversial and was condemned by Amnesty International, who described the charges as "fabricated" and named him a prisoner of conscience.

=== Reaction ===
P Chidambaram, India's home minister, condemned the attack, saying it showed the "savage nature" of the Maoists. The attack was a blow to the Indian government as it came days after Home Minister P Chidambaram described the rebels as "cowards enacting dramas". Mr Chidambaram has said troops will intensify the offensive if the rebels do not renounce violence and enter peace talks. On 9 April Chidamabram offered his resignation to Prime Minister Manmohan Singh over the issue, which the Prime Minister rejected.

The Bharatiya Janata Party (BJP) argued for an "all-out offensive" against the Maoists.

The Maoist leader Gopal stated that the attack was conducted as a "direct consequence" to the government's Operation Green Hunt.

== See also ==
- Timeline of the Naxalite–Maoist insurgency
- 2021 Sukma-Bijapur attack
- 2000 Zhani-Vedeno ambush
- 2024 Kanker clash
