= Red corridor =

Region in eastern India that experiences considerable left-wing extremist violence

Red Corridor designates the regions in India that have an active presence and influence of Naxalite–Maoist insurgents. The insurgency reached its peak in the late 2000s, encompassing nearly 180 affected districts and has been on the decline since then.

In April 2024, the number of Naxal-affected districts were 38 across nine states. As per the Ministry of Home Affairs, it was further limited to 18 districts by March 2025, seven districts by February 2026, and a single district by April 2026. In August 2026, in reply to a question in the Parliament of India, the Government of India announced that there were now zero Naxal-affected districts in the country.

== History ==
The Naxalite–Maoist insurgency is an ongoing conflict between left-wing extremist groups and the Government of India. The insurgency started after the 1967 Naxalbari uprising and the subsequent split of the Communist Party of India (Marxist), which led to the creation of a Marxist–Leninist faction. The faction splintered into various groups supportive of Maoist ideology, claiming to fight a rural rebellion and a "People's war" against the state. Naxalite groups have been designated as terrorist organisations in India under the Unlawful Activities (Prevention) Act, 1967.

== Red Corridor ==
The influence zone of the Naxalites is referred to as the "Red Corridor". The armed wing of the Maoists is the People's Liberation Guerrilla Army, which has carried out numerous attacks against the security forces and government personnel across the region.

=== Socio-economic conditions ===
States that formed part of the Red Corridor–such as Chhattisgarh, Jharkhand, and Odisha–have historically had a low Human Development Index and high poverty rate. A key characteristic of these regions is that they are densely populated and their reliance on primary sector activities such as agriculture, with the majority of the population not owning any lands. The Maoist movement began in the late 1960s as a conflict between the tribal peasants and the land owners, driven by a lack of tribal land ownership and autonomy over the natural resources. Although the region had abundant natural resources, tribal communities participated in Naxal insurgency probably as a form of resistance against the state and state-sponsored resource extraction in their lands.

Impoverished areas lacking electricity, running water, and adequate public healthcare probably accepted social services provided by Naxalite groups, and gave their support to the groups in exchange. The absence of state influence allowed the Naxalites to assume administrative authority in these areas, such as enacting land distribution policies and building irrigation infrastructure. However, the Indian government states that the Naxalites actively prevent the common people from accessing essential public services.

=== Affected districts ===
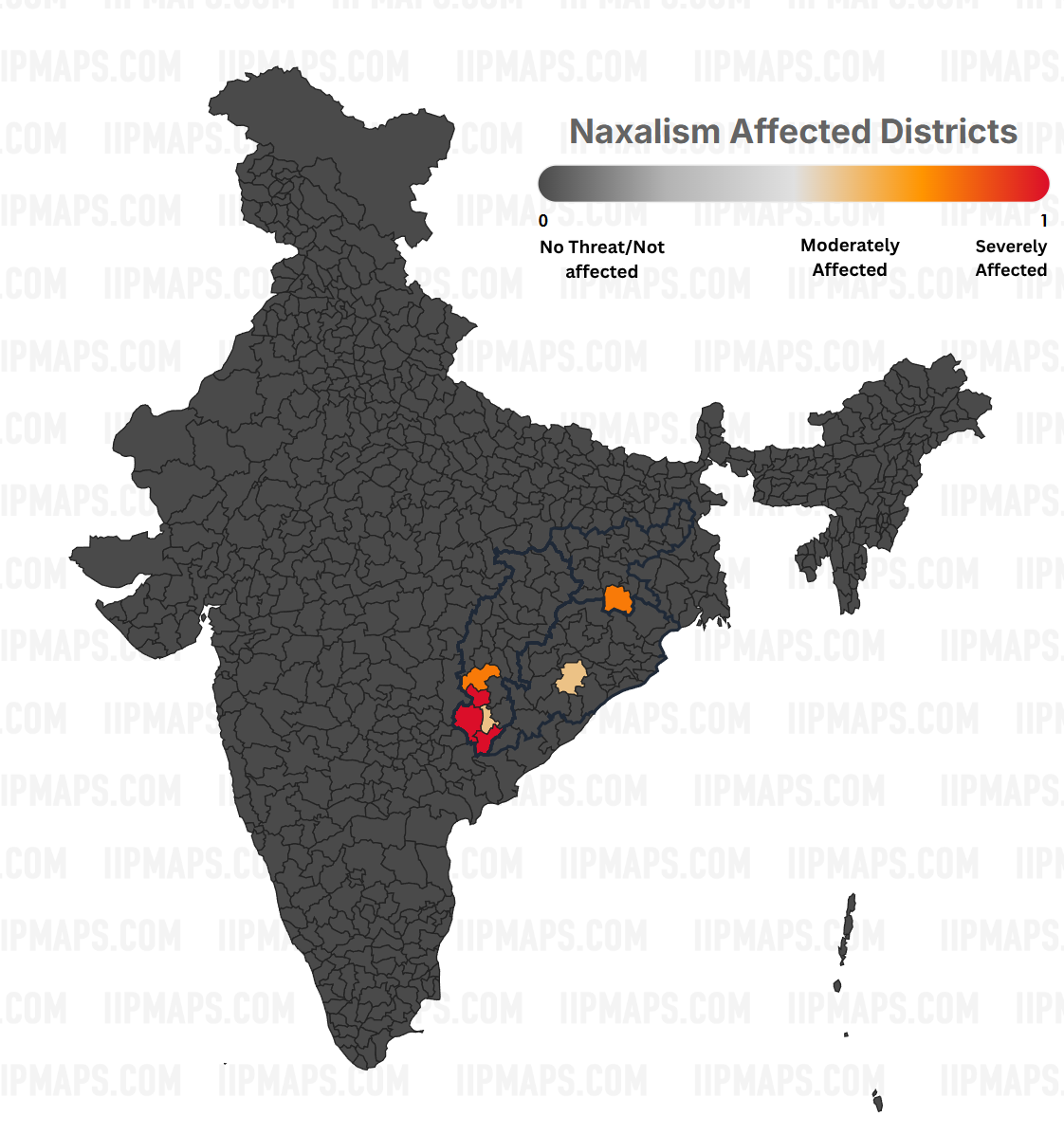
Change in the extent of the Red Corridor over the years from 2007 to early 2026

The Naxal insurgency reached its peak around 2007, affecting nearly 180 districts, and has been on the decline since then due to the counter-insurgency operations and state sponsored development plans. By April 2024, the number of Naxal-affected districts had reduced to 38 across nine states. In March 2025, the Home Minister informed the Parliament of India that Naxal insurgency was largely limited to 18 districts, six of which were classified as 'most affected'. By February 2026, the Home Ministry announced that the Naxal influence was limited to seven districts, and by April 2026, West Singhbum in Jharkhand remained as the sole affected district. On 5 August 2026, in reply to a question in the Indian Parliament, the Home Ministry announced that there were now zero Naxal-affected districts in the country.

== See also ==
- List of Naxalite and Maoist groups in India
- List of terrorist incidents in India
- Revolutionary base area
- Separatist movements of India
- Terrorism in India
- Timeline of the Naxalite-Maoist insurgency
