= Communist Party of India (Maoist) =

Militant Maoist political party in India

- Abbreviation: CPI (Maoist)
- General Secretary: Thippiri Tirupathi (surrendered)
- Founded: 21 September 2004
- Banned: 22 June 2009
- Merger of: • CPI(ML) People's War • MCC • CPI(ML) Naxalbari
- Student wing: • AIRSF • Radical Students Union
- Youth wing: Radical Youth League
- Women's wing: Krantikari Adivasi Mahila Sangathan
- Paramilitary wings: • PLGA • People's Militia
- Trade union wing: Sikasa (alleged)
- Cultural organisation: Chetna Natya Manch
- Ideology: Communism; Marxism–Leninism–Maoism
- Political position: Far-left
- Motives: Overthrow of the Government of India by means of armed rebellion; Establishment of a Maoist regime in India; To destroy the state machinery and establish the Indian People's Democratic Federative Republic
- Active region(s): India (mainly in Red corridor)
- Status: Designated as a terrorist organisation by India; Designated as unlawful association by the Madhya Pradesh, Andhra Pradesh, and Chhattisgarh governments

The Communist Party of India (Maoist) is a banned Marxist–Leninist–Maoist communist political party and militant organization in India which aims to overthrow the Republic of India through protracted people's war. It was founded on 21 September 2004, through the merger of the CPIML People's War and the MCCI. The party has been designated as a terrorist organisation in India under the Unlawful Activities (Prevention) Act since 2009.

In 2006, Prime Minister Manmohan Singh referred to the Maoists as "the single biggest internal security challenge" for India, and said that the "deprived and alienated sections of the population" form the backbone of the Maoist movement in India. Government officials have declared that, in 2013, 76 districts in the country were affected by "left-wing extremism", with another 106 districts under ideological influence. Chhattisgarh is often affected by the party's militant activities.

In 2024, the party faced a major setback when the government increased its counterinsurgency operations in states affected by the insurgency. Another setback occurred in 2025 when the leader of the group Nambala Keshava Rao, was killed in an encounter with security forces in Chhattisgarh.

== History ==
The Communist Party of India (Maoist) was founded on 21 September 2004 through the merger of the Communist Party of India (Marxist–Leninist) People's War (People's War Group) and the Maoist Communist Centre of India (MCCI). The high-level bilateral meetings between the two erstwhile parties started in February 2003 and continued for several months, entailing discussions on major questions concerning their future political orientation. In the course of these, unity could be found, and 5 Key Papers for the new, unified organisation were finalized and adopted:

• "Hold High the Bright Red Banner of Marxism-Leninism-Maoism", a primarily ideological document explaining the unified party's understanding of the development and content of Marxism–Leninism–Maoism. It forms the cornerstone of the party's ideological and political principles and views.

• "Party Programme", a concise 35-point outline of the party's general political line, synthesized out of more than 30 years of experience of the MCCI and the PWG. It includes the Indian Revolution's minimum and maximum programmes for establishing Socialism-Communism according to the Maoists.

• "Party Constitution", the foremost political-organizational document laying down the Maoists' general program, the rights and duties of their members, party discipline, organisational structure, and how they acquire their funds for operations.

• "Strategy and Tactics of the Indian Revolution", an elaborate class analysis of Indian society, followed up by "the determination of the main blow" of the CPI (Maoist)'s forces at its given stage, as well as the forms of struggle and organisation the Maoists see as appropriate for achieving their aim of "New Democratic and Socialist Revolution".

• "Political Resolution", a detailed analysis of India's Domestic Situation, as well as the International Situation, alongside its call for building the "subjective forces", i.e., the communists' vanguard capability, to utilize what they evaluated as an "excellent revolutionary situation".

The merger was first declared in a "Unity Commune" formed with extensive cultural programmes and security precautions, which ran from early September to early October in 2004. Following that, the founding of the unified party was finally announced to the public on 14 October of the same year. In the course of the merger, a provisional central committee was constituted, with the erstwhile People's War Group leader Muppala Lakshmana Rao, alias "Ganapathi", as general secretary. Further, on May Day 2014, the Communist Party of India (Marxist–Leninist) Naxalbari merged into the CPI (Maoist).

== Ideology ==
The CPI (Maoist) observes that the Indian state is being "run by a collaboration of imperialists, the comprador bourgeoisie and feudal lords." According to the South Asia Terrorism Portal, the two factions of the Party adhered to differing strands of communism before their 2004 merger. However, "both organizations shared their belief in the 'annihilation of class enemies' and in extreme violence as a means to secure organizational goals". The People's War Group (PWG) maintained a Marxist–Leninist stance, while the Maoist Communist Centre of India (MCCI) took a Maoist stance. After the merger, the PWG secretary of Andhra Pradesh announced that the newly formed CPI-Maoist would follow Marxism–Leninism–Maoism as its "ideological basis guiding its thinking in all spheres of its activities." Included in this ideology is a commitment to "protracted armed struggle" to undermine and to seize power from the state. On May Day 2014, Ganapathy and Ajith (Secretary of the CPI (ML) Naxalbari) also issued a joint statement stating that "the unified party would [continue to] take Marxism-Leninism-Maoism as its guiding ideology."

The party's ideology is contained in a "Party Programme." In the document, the Maoists denounce globalisation as a war on the people by market fundamentalists and the caste system as a form of social oppression. The CPI (Maoist) claim that they are conducting a "people's war", a strategic approach developed by Mao Zedong during the guerrilla warfare phase of the Chinese Communist Party. Their eventual objective is to install a "people's government" via a New Democratic Revolution.

== Location and prominence ==
CPI(Maoist) currently operates in the forest belt around central India in the states of Chhattisgarh, Bihar, Jharkhand, Maharashtra, and Odisha. It is present even in remote regions of Jharkhand and Andhra Pradesh, as well as in Bihar and the tribal-dominated areas in the borderlands of Chhattisgarh, Maharashtra, West Bengal, and Odisha. The CPI (Maoist) aims to consolidate its power in this area and establish a Compact Revolutionary Zone from which to advance the people's war in other parts of India. A 2005 Frontline cover story called the Bhamragad Taluka, where the Madia Gond Adivasis live, the heart of the Maoist-affected region in Maharashtra. Recently, the Indian government has claimed that in 2013, Andhra Pradesh, Arunachal Pradesh, Assam, Bihar, Chhattisgarh, Delhi, Gujarat, Haryana, Jharkhand, Karnataka, Kerala, Madhya Pradesh, Odisha, Punjab, Tamil Nadu, Tripura, Uttarakhand, Uttar Pradesh and West Bengal experienced [ideological] "influence" of "Left Wing Extremism"; while claiming that armed activity by the "Left Wing" extremists was noticed in Andhra Pradesh, Bihar, Chhattisgarh, Jharkhand, Karnataka, Kerala, Maharashtra, Odisha and West Bengal.

== Organisation ==
The last General Secretary was Thippiri Tirupathi, who was appointed in September 2025 and resigned in February 2026. His predecessor, Nambala Keshava Rao (alias "Basavaraj"), along with 27 other Naxals, was killed during a gunfight with Indian security forces in Abujhmarh, Chhattisgarh, on 21 May 2025. Rao, in turn, took the post after Muppala Lakshmana Rao, who used the alias "Ganapathy". The party hierarchy consists of the Regional Bureaus, which look after two or three states each; the State Committees; the Zonal Committees; the District Committees; and the "dalams" (armed squads). Communist writer Jan Myrdal noted that the CPI (Maoist) also organises events like "The Leadership Training Programme" to endure the forces of the state.

=== Politburo ===
As per the communist party policies, the highest decision-making body of the CPI (Maoist) is the Politburo, with thirteen or fourteen members, six of whom were killed or arrested between 2007 and 2010. Shamsher Singh Sheri alias Karam Singh, who died of Cerebral Malaria-Jaundice on 30 October 2005, was a Politburo member. Between 2005 and 2011, the State captured several Politburo members of the party, including Sushil Roy alias "Som", Narayan Sanyal alias "N. Prasad", Pramod Mishra, Amitabh Bagchi, Baccha Prasad Singh, Anukul Chandra Naskar and Akhilesh Yadav. Arvind Ji alias "Deo Kumar Singh" died of a heart attack on 21 March 2018. B. Sudhakar, alias "Kiran", was another Politburo member of CPI (Maoist), but he surrendered in 2019. Akkiraju Haragopal, alias "Ramakrishna", died in October 2021 due to illness. Katakam Sudarshan, alias Anand, was a prominent Politburo member until he died in 2023. Ashutosh Tudu and Anuj Thakur are two of the arrested Politburo members of the party. Among those killed, Cherukuri Rajkumar alias "Azad" and Mallojula Koteswara Rao alias "Kishenji", were two past members of the CPI (Maoist)'s Politburo. Prashant Bose alias "Kishan-da" was a member of the Politburo until his arrest. In October 2025, a top Politburo member Mallujola Venugopal, surrendered to the Maharashtra police. On 22 February 2026, the General Secretary and Politburo member Thippiri Tirupathi surrendered in Telangana. On 28 July 2026, Politburo member Misir Besra was arrested in Jharkhand by the police.

Current CPI (Maoist) Politburo Members
| Name | Alias(es) | Notes |
|---|---|---|
| Mupalla Laxman Rao | Ganapathy | Former General Secretary. |

=== Central Committee ===
The Central Committee of the CPI (Maoist) takes direction from the Politburo, passes information to its members, and has 32 members. During an interview in 2010, Anand told media personnel that out of the 45 members of the Central Committee of CPI (Maoist), 8 have been arrested; the agencies of the Indian government have killed 22. Anuradha Ghandy, who died on 12 April 2008, was an eminent member of CPI (Maoist)'s Central Committee. Kadari Satyanarayan Reddy alias "Kosa", Thippiri Tirupathi alias "Devuji", Malla Raji Reddy and Mallujola Venugopal alias "Bhupati" are another three cadres and Central Committee members of the party. Madvi Hidma is the youngest Central Committee member of the party. As of 22 September 2011, nine of the Central Committee members were jailed, including Moti Lal Soren, Vishnu, Varanasi Subramanyam, Shobha, Misir Besra, Purnendu Sekhar Mukherjee, and Vijay Kumar Arya. One more Central Committee member, Ravi Sharma, was captured later. Ginugu Narsimha Reddy alias Jampanna surrendered to police in December 2017. Varkapur Chandramouli, Patel Sudhakar Reddy, Narmada Akka, and Milind Teltumbde were killed by armed forces. Another Central Committee member Haribhushan, died due to COVID. Another CC member, B.G. Krishnamoorthy alias BGK, Vijay was arrested in November 2021 along with another PLGA, Savithri by the Kerala ATS. Another member, Uday, was killed in 2025 by Greyhounds in Andhra Pradesh. In September 2025, Kosa was killed in an encounter in Chhattisgarh, Mallujola Venugopal, also a politburo member, surrendered to Police in Maharashtra, and another Central Committee member, Pullari Prasad Rao alias Chandranna, surrendered in Telangana in October 2025. Another member and leader of Dandakaranya Special Zonal Committee Madvi Hidma was killed in Andhra Pradesh in November 2025. In December 2025, another Central Committee member and Senior leader Ganesh Uike alias Paka Hanumanthu was killed in Odisha. In January 2026, another central committee member, Pathiram Manjhi alias anal da, was killed in Jharkhand by CRPF. On 22 February 2026, two Central Committee members, Thippiri Tirupathi and Malla Raja Reddy, surrendered in Telangana. On 28 July 2026, Central Committee member Misir Besra was arrested in Jharkhand by the police.

Current CPI (Maoist) Central Committee Members
| Name | Alias(es) | Notes |
|---|---|---|
| Mupalla Laxman Rao | Ganapathy | Former General Secretary, also a member of the Politburo. Source |

=== Publication division ===
The CPI (Maoist) has a "publication division". B. Sudhakar, alias "Kiran", who was a Politburo member before his surrender, used to work for this division.

=== Military Commissions ===
The Central Military Commission (CMC) is the main armed body of the CPI (Maoist), and its Central Committee constitutes it. In addition to the CMC, the party has also raised state military commissions. The CMC has been headed by Nambala Keshava Rao alias Basavaraj, Anand and Arvind Ji. Anuj Thakur is an arrested CMC-member of the party. Kishenji and Chandramouli were also members of the CPI (Maoist)'s CMC.

=== Technical Committee ===
The Central Technical Committee (CTC) is responsible for the fabrication of weapons and explosives. The Technical Committee consists of a few selected members with specialized knowledge in science and research. It works under the direct supervision of the Central Military Commission (CMC) of the Party. Sadanala Ramakrishna, a senior Maoist leader, was the scretaryry of the Committee and was arrested in February 2012 in Kolkata.

=== Estimated strength ===
The military wings of the founding organisations, the People's Liberation Guerrilla Army (the military wing of the MCCI) and the People's Guerrilla Army (the military wing of the PWG), also underwent a merger. The name of the unified military organisation is the People's Liberation Guerrilla Army (PLGA) and it is grouped into three sections — the Basic, the Secondary, and the Main squad. All the PLGA members are volunteers, and they do not receive any wages. During his stay in the guerrilla zones, Jan Myrdal noted that the female cadres of CPI (Maoist) constituted about 40% of its PLGA, and held numerous "command positions"; but currently, the female members comprise 60% of the Maoist cadres, and women commanders head 20 of the 27 divisions of the guerrilla zones.

P.V. Ramana, of the Observer Research Foundation in Delhi, estimates the Naxalites' current strength at 9,000–10,000 armed fighters, with access to about 6,500 firearms. The analyses, as of September 2013, suggested that the estimated number of PLGA members has decreased from 10,000−12,000 to 8,000−9,000. But Gautam Navlakha has suggested that the PLGA has strengthened over the past few years and has mustered 12 companies and over 25 platoons and a supply platoon in 2013 as compared to 8 companies and 13 platoons in 2008. The People's Militia, which is armed with bows, arrows, and machetes, and is believed to assist the PLGA logistically, is estimated to be around 38,000.

=== Medical units ===
The Maoists had structured "medical units" in the villages of Bastar, and the CPI (Maoist) operates "mobile medical units." Rahul Pandita writes:

"In the field of health as well, the Maoists often fill in large gaps left by the state. Their mobile medical units cover large distances to offer primary health care to tribals.... Various training camps are held regularly on preventive measures against diseases such as diarrhoea or malaria. The grassroots doctors in the medical squads can administer vaccines, identify a number of diseases through symptoms, and treat injuries that are not severe. Some can even conduct simple blood tests to arrive at a diagnosis. This is a significant advantage in such areas."

Furthermore, the CPI (Maoist)'s medical services squads also move from village to village and provide "basic medical training" to selected young tribal people, enabling them to identify frequently occurring diseases through their presages so that they can also distribute vaccines to the patients.

=== Frontal organisations ===
The frontal organisations of the party include the Radical Youth League, Rythu Coolie Sangham, Radical Students Union, Singareni Karmika Samakya, Viplava Karmika Samakhya, Porattam Kerala, Ayyankali pada Kerala, Njattuvela Kerala and All India Revolutionary Students Federation, Krantikari Adivasi Mahila Sangathan, and Chetna Natya Manch.

== Strategy ==
=== Governance tactics ===
The "organising principles" of the Maoists are sketched out from the Chinese Communist Revolution and the Vietnam War. The CPI (Maoist) has organised Dandakaranya into ten divisions, each comprising three area committees; every Area Committee is composed of several Janatana Sarkars (people's governments). The party says that a Janatana Sarkar is established by the election procedure involving a group of villages, and has nine departments — agriculture, trade and industry, economic, justice, defence, health, public relations, education and culture, and jungle. The Janatana Sarkar provides education up to primary level in the subjects of mathematics, social science, politics, and Hindi, in the "camp schools" using the textbooks published by the party in Gondi. They also use DVDs to educate the children in the streams of science and history.

In their efforts to intimidate their political adversaries and consolidate control, the Maoists tax local villagers, extort businesses, abduct and kill "class enemies" such as government officials and police officers, and regulate the flow of aid and goods. To help fill their ranks, the Maoists force each family under their domain to supply one family member, and threaten those who resist with violence.

The organisation has been holding "Public Courts", which have been described as kangaroo courts, against their opponents. These "courts" function in the areas under de facto Maoist control. The Maoists have also taken care to demolish government institutions under their de facto jurisdiction. They have also demolished railroad tracks and school buildings that are often used as temporary camps by security forces.

=== Military strategies and tactics ===
The CPI (Maoist) rejects "engagement" with what it terms the "prevailing bourgeois democracy" and focuses on capturing political power through protracted armed struggle based on guerrilla warfare. This strategy entails building up bases in rural and remote areas and transforming them first into guerrilla zones, and then into "liberated zones", in addition to encircling cities.

The military hardware used by Maoists, as indicated through many seizures, includes RDX cable wires, gelignite sticks, detonators, country-made weapons, INSAS rifles, AK-47s, SLRs, and improvised explosive devices. The Maoists condemn the accusations that they manage arms through China, Myanmar and Bangladesh. On the subject, Ganapathy says, "Our weapons are mainly country-made. All the modern weapons we have are mainly seized from the government armed forces when we attack them."

The CPI (Maoist)'s General Secretary says that they keep on appealing to the "lower-level personnel" in the paramilitary and police forces not to attack them, but rather "join hands with the masses" and "consciously" point their guns towards those whom the Maoists view as "real enemies". They further claim that "only when the government forces come to attack us [Maoists] carrying guns do we attack them in self-defence". In Jharkhand, the police have also seized posters from various places which read, "Policemen keep away from the green hunt and try to be friends of poor. Police jawan, do not obey orders of the senior officials, instead join the people's army."

== Funding ==
Some sources claim that the funding for the Maoists comes from abductions, extortion, and by setting up unofficial administrations to collect taxes in rural areas where the official government appears absent. Poppy cultivation is another suspected source of funding for Maoists in the Ghagra area of Gumla district in Jharkhand and in parts of Gumla, Kishanganj and Purnia districts in Bihar, where security forces claim that opium fields are hidden among maize crops. Reports from Debagarh district in Odisha indicate that the Maoists also support hemp cultivation to help fund their activities.

== Legal status ==
The party is regarded as a "left-wing extremist entity" and a terrorist outfit by the Indian government. Several of their members have been arrested under the now-defunct Prevention of Terrorist Activities Act. The group is officially banned by the state governments of Odisha, Chhattisgarh, and Andhra Pradesh, among others. The party has protested these bans. The Indian government, led by the United Progressive Alliance, banned the CPI (Maoist) under the Unlawful Activities (Prevention) Act (UAPA) as a terrorist organisation on 22 June 2009. Earlier, the Union Home Minister, P. Chidambaram, had asked the West Bengal Chief Minister, Buddhadeb Bhattacharjee, to ban the Maoists following the Lalgarh Violence. Maoist Communist Centre (MCC) and all its formations and front organisations have been banned by the Government of India.

== Controversies ==
=== Opposition ===
The Government of India regards the party as a serious security threat. It says it will combine improved policing with socio-economic measures to defuse grievances that fuel the Maoist cause. In 2005, Chhattisgarh State sponsored an anti-Maoist movement called the Salwa Judum. The group, which the BBC alleges is "government-backed", an allegation rejected by the Indian government, has come under criticism for "perpetrating atrocities and abuse against women", using child soldiers, burning people alive, and the looting of property and destruction of homes. These allegations were rejected by a fact-finding commission of the National Human Rights Commission of India, appointed by the Supreme Court of India, which determined that the Salwa Judum was a spontaneous reaction by tribes against Maoist atrocities perpetrated against them. The camps are guarded by police officers, paramilitary forces and child soldiers empowered with the official title "special police officer" (SPO). However, on 5 July 2011, the Supreme Court of India declared the Salwa Judum illegal and unconstitutional. The court directed the Chhattisgarh government to recover all the firearms given to the militia along with the ammunition and accessories. It also ordered the government to investigate all instances of alleged criminal activities of Salwa Judum. But the state government did not abide by the Supreme Court's decision. In August 2013, the Supreme Court of India asked the state government to explain why its failure to execute the July 2011 order of disbanding the SPOs should not be considered contempt of court." In March 2019, a municipal school teacher, Yogendra Meshram, was killed by the Maoists in Korchi, which locals vehemently protested. The Maoist leadership later apologized for the killing, stating it was a mistake and that Meshram was wrongly suspected to be a police informer.

== International connections ==
The CPI (Maoist) maintains dialogue with the Communist Party of Nepal (Maoist Centre), which controls most of Nepal, in the Coordination Committee of Maoist Parties and Organisations of South Asia (CCOMPOSA), according to several intelligence sources and think tanks. These links are, however, denied by the Communist Party of Nepal (Maoist-Centre)

While under detention in June 2009, a suspected Lashkar-e-Taiba (LeT) operative indicated that the LeT and the CPI (Maoist) had attempted to co-ordinate activities in Jharkhand state. But, Ganapathy has denied any links between CPI (Maoist) and LeT, stating that the allegations are "only mischievous, calculated propaganda by the police officials, bureaucrats and leaders of the reactionary political parties" to malign the Maoists' image with the aim of labeling them as terrorists in order to justify "their brutal terror campaign against Maoists and the people in the areas of armed agrarian struggle." Kishenji also criticised LeT for having "wrong" and "anti-people" policies, though he said that the Maoists may consider backing up a few of their demands, if LeT halts its "terrorist acts".

Reports in 2010 indicate that the Communist Party of the Philippines, Southeast Asia's longest-lived communist insurgent group, has been reported to have engaged in training activities for guerrilla warfare with Indian Maoists.

The Indian Maoists deny operational links with foreign groups, such as the Nepalese Maoists, but do claim comradeship with them. Some members of the Indian government accept this, while others argue that operational links do exist, with training coming from Sri Lankan Maoists and small arms from China. China denies any suggestion that it supports foreign Maoist rebels, citing improvements in relations between India and China, including movement towards resolving their border disputes. Maoists in Nepal, India, and the Philippines are less reticent about their shared goals.

== Indian Government's paramilitary offensive against the CPI (Maoist) ==
In September 2009, an all-out offensive was launched by the Government of India's paramilitary forces and the state's police forces against the CPI (Maoist), which was termed by the Indian media as the "Operation Green Hunt".

On 3 January 2013, the government issued a statement that it was deploying 10,000 more central paramilitary personnel in Bastar, Odisha and some parts of Jharkhand. On 8 June 2014, the Minister of Home Affairs officially approved the deployment of another 10,000 troops from the paramilitary forces to fight against the Maoists in Chhattisgarh. The count of personnel from State Armed Police Forces involved in counter-Maoism operations in the Red Corridor is estimated to number around 200,000. Along with firearms, the armed forces' personnel use satellite phones, unmanned aerial vehicles and Air Force helicopters.

In 2011, the Indian Army, while denying its direct role in the offensive operations, accepted that it has been training the paramilitary personnel to fight against the Maoists; however, the Maoists have objected to the Army's stationing in the Red Corridor. On 30 May 2013, the Indian Air Force's Air Chief Marshal declared that apart from the currently operating MI-17 helicopters, the Indian Force has decided to induct a unit of MI-17V5 helicopters to "provide full support to anti-Naxal operations." In August 2014, the Ministry of Home Affairs had stated that 2,000 personnel from Nagaland's Indian Reserve Battalions (IRB) were deployed in counter-insurgency and counter-terrorism operations against the Maoists in Bastar.

Since the start of the operation, 2,266 Maoist militants have been killed, 10,181 have been arrested, and 9,714 have surrendered.

== Notable attacks ==
- On 12 June 2009, at least 29 members of the Indian Police were killed in an ambush attack by Maoist rebels in Rajnandgaon, 90 km (56 mi) from Raipur (India's Chhattisgarh state).
- On 15 February 2010, several of the guerrilla commanders of CPI (Maoist), all of whom are believed to be female, killed 24 personnel of the Eastern Frontier Rifles at Silda in West Bengal. The attack was reportedly directed by Kishenji, and after the Maoist raid at the paramilitary camp, Kishenji addressed the news media, saying, "We have not started it (violence), and we will not stop it first. Let us see whether the central government is honest about a solution, and we will definitely co–operate.... This is the answer to Chidambaram's 'Operation Green Hunt', and unless the Centre stop this inhuman military operation, we are going to answer the Centre this way only."
- On 6 April 2010, the Maoists ambushed and killed 76 paramilitary personnel who fell into a trap laid by the lurking Maoists. The CPI (Maoist) described the incident as a "direct consequence" of the Operation Green Hunt, stating that "We have been surrounded by paramilitary battalions. They are setting fire to the forests and making adivasis (tribals) flee. In this situation, we have no other alternative (but to stage attacks)."
- On 25 May 2013, the CPI (Maoist) ambushed a convoy of the Indian National Congress at Bastar, and killed 27 people including Mahendra Karma, Nand Kumar Patel and Vidya Charan Shukla. While regretting the death of a few "innocent Congress [INC] functionaries" during the incident, they hold the Bharatiya Janata Party and Indian National Congress' policies, which they view as "anti-people" in nature, as directly responsible for the attack. Later, 14 Maoists who had allegedly participated in the ambush were gunned down in Odisha by the Special Operation Group with the assistance of the Border Security Force.
- On 3 April 2021, twenty-two soldiers were killed in a Maoist ambush on the border of Bijapur and Sukma districts in southern Chhattisgarh. Those killed included 14 Chhattisgarh police officers and seven jawans of the CRPF, including six members of its elite CoBRA unit, specially trained to take on Maoist guerrillas.
- On 4 January 2022, CPI (Maoist) attacked former BJP MLA of Manoharpur, Gurucharan Nayak, in West Singhbhum district of Jharkhand. Nayak escaped, but the Maoists slit the throats of his two bodyguards, snatched their AK-47 rifles, and fled. The two bodyguards died in the incident.
- On April 26, 2023, 10 policemen and their driver belonging to the District Reserve Guard (DRG) of Chhattisgarh Police were killed in an IED attack by Maoists in Dantewada District, Chhattisgarh. The forces were attacked while returning from counterinsurgency operations in the area.

== See also ==
- List of organisations banned by the Government of India
- Anti-revisionism
- Revolutionary Internationalist Movement
- List of communist parties
- List of Naxalite and Maoist groups in India
- List of anti-revisionist groups
- Red Ant Dream
