= Communist Party of India (Marxist–Leninist) People's War =

Communist party faction

Communist Party of India (Marxist–Leninist) People's War People's War Group
- Founded: 1980
- Dissolved: 2004
- Merged into: Communist Party of India (Maoist)
- Ideology: Communism; Marxism–Leninism–Maoism
- Political position: Far-left
- Regional affiliation: CCOMPOSA

Communist Party of India (Marxist–Leninist) People's War, usually called People's War Group (PWG), was an underground communist party in India. It merged with the Maoist Communist Centre of India to form the Communist Party of India (Maoist) in 2004. Muppala Lakshmana Rao ('Ganapathi') was the general secretary of the party. The ideology of the party was Marxism-Leninism-Maoism.

The party was a member of the Coordination Committee of Maoist Parties and Organisations of South Asia (CCOMPOSA), which was an umbrella network of regional Marxist-Leninist-Maoist political entities and insurgent groups.

== History ==
The party was founded in Andhra Pradesh in 1980, by Kondapalli Seetharamaiah and Dr. Kolluri Chiranjeevi. It emerged from a re-articulation of Naxalite activists in the Telangana region. The party had its roots in the Andhra Committee, that had broken away from the Central Organising Committee, Communist Party of India (Marxist–Leninist) in 1976. The new party was formed by the merger with the Kothandaraman grouping in Tamil Nadu. The new party resolved to continue armed struggle whilst engaging in mass movements. The party renounced participation in electoral politics. It upheld the legacy of Charu Majumdar. The party analysed Indian society as semi-feudal and semi-colonial. The party was initially largely confined to the Telangana region, but later expanded to other areas of Andhra Pradesh as well as Maharashtra, Madhya Pradesh, and Odisha.

== Recent history ==
In August 1998 CPI (ML) Party Unity, based in Jahanabad, Bihar, merged with CPI (ML) PW. CPI (ML) Party Unity had been based in Bihar, and after the merger CPI (ML) PW expanded its geographic scope of operations significantly. It began establishing state committees in states like Kerala, Haryana and Punjab.

In October 2002 CPI (ML) PW issued a declaration containing death threats against the Chief Ministers of three Indian states; Buddhadeb Bhattacharjee, Chandrababu Naidu and Babulal Marandi. Exactly a year later, the organization conducted an assassination attempt against Chandrababu Naidu.

On 21 September 2004 CPI (ML) PW merged with the Maoist Communist Centre of India to form the Communist Party of India (Maoist).

In November 2004, a mass rally of some 150,000 people was held in Hyderabad in support of the CPI (ML) PW (the merger into CPI (Maoist) had not yet been made public at this point).

== Tactics ==
The armed squads of the party consisted of ten persons. The squads used encounters and landmines in confrontations with security forces.

== Bans ==
The party was banned in Andhra Pradesh in May 1992, under the Criminal Law (Amendment) Act. In February 1992 the Union Home Ministry requested the states of Maharashtra, Madhya Pradesh and Orissa to ban the party. The party remained unbanned at the national level, though.

In 2000 CPI (ML) PW launched the People's Guerilla Army, which integrated previously autonomous units. The party had thousands of activists organized in 'dalams', small guerrilla units. CPI (ML) PW and PGA were mainly active in Andhra Pradesh, Orissa, Jharkhand, Bihar and the Midnapore district in West Bengal.

In 2001 the party held its first congress, although it counted this as the second because the CPI (ML) PW claimed to be a continuation of the original CPI (ML), which had had its first congress in 1970.

On 23 September 2004 the Andhra Pradesh state government declared they would be holding peace talks with CPI (ML) PW and CPI (ML) Janashakti.

In December 2004 CPI (ML) PW and all its front organizations were banned as a 'terrorist organization' under the Unlawful Activities (Prevention) Amendment Act, 2004.

== Regional units ==
=== Andhra Pradesh ===
During the first two decades of its existence, the policies of the Andhra Pradesh state government vacillated in its approach towards the party. At some points, the state cracked down heavily on the party, at other points its approach was more conciliatory. The party was able to exploit the political conflict between the two main political parties in Andhra Pradesh during the 1980s to its advantage, and both of these parties would seek support from CPI (ML) PW in times of local elections. The CPI (ML) PW would provide such help in exchange for release of prisoners and laxed pressure on the movement from the security forces. Moreover, the party was strengthened economically through "taxations" of forest contractors.

In 2004 CPI (ML) PW as part of peace talks with the Andhra Pradesh state government.

=== Orissa ===
In February 1998 a police officer was killed in southern Orissa by CPI (ML) PW guerrillas. This was the first attack against Orissa Police by CPI (ML) PW fighters from neighboring Andhra Pradesh.

Between 2000 and 2001 there were several killings in conflicts between CPI (ML) PW and MCC in Orissa. However, in September 2002, CPI (ML) PW and MCC signed an agreement to coordinate activities in the state. At the time Santosh was the head of the CPI (ML) PW unit in the state.

At the time of the April 2004 state assembly elections, CPI (ML) PW ran a boycott campaign in its strongholds in the state (the Malkangiri and Rayagada constituencies). However voting increased significantly in these constituencies in spite of boycott calls from CPI (ML) PW, leading to speculations whether the influence of the party was waning in the region.

== See also ==
- 2004 Lahsuna massacre
- Communist Party of India (Marxist-Leninist) Liberation
- List of Naxalite and Maoist groups in India

== Bibliography ==
- Ramana, P. V. The Naxal challenge: causes, linkages, and policy options Pearson Education. 1 December 2008. ISBN 978-81-317-0406-6
- Öberg, Magnus. Resources, governance and civil conflict Routledge. 1st ed. 30 August 2007. ISBN 978-0-415-41671-9
