= Koya (tribe) =

Tribal community in central and southern India

Koitur
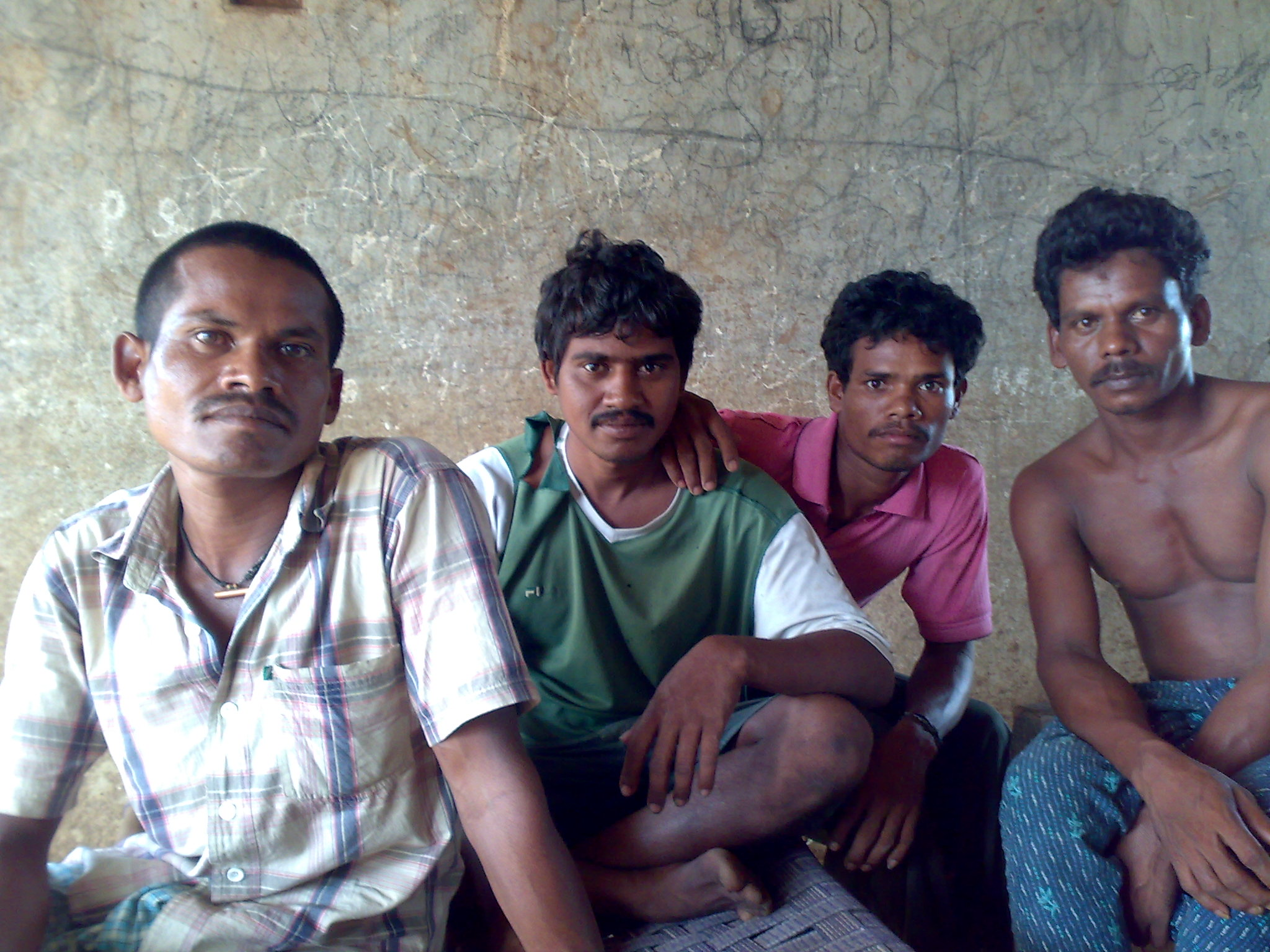
- Koya men

Total population
- 779,854 (2011 Census)

Regions with significant populations
- India
- Andhra Pradesh (incl. Telangana): 590,739
- Odisha: 142,137
- Chhattisgarh: 46,978

Languages
- Koya • Telugu • Odia •

Religion
- Hinduism Christianity

Related ethnic groups
- Gonds, Dorla, Telugus, other Dravidian peoples

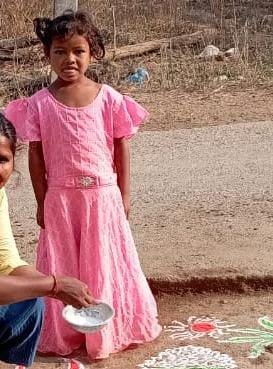

The Koya are a Dravidian tribal community native to the Indian states of Andhra Pradesh, Telangana, Chhattisgarh, and Odisha. They speak the Koya language, a Dravidian language related to Gondi that is known endonymically as koya basha. They refer to themselves as Koitur in Koya.

The Koya are commonly referred to as Koi, Koyalu, Koyollu, Koya Doralu, Dorala Sattam, etc. Koya tribes can be further divided into Koya, Doli Koya, Gutta Koya or Gotti Koya, Kammara Koya, Musara Koya, Oddi Koya, Pattidi Koya, Rasha Koya, Lingadhari Koya (ordinary), Kottu Koya, Bhine Koya, Raja Koya, etc.

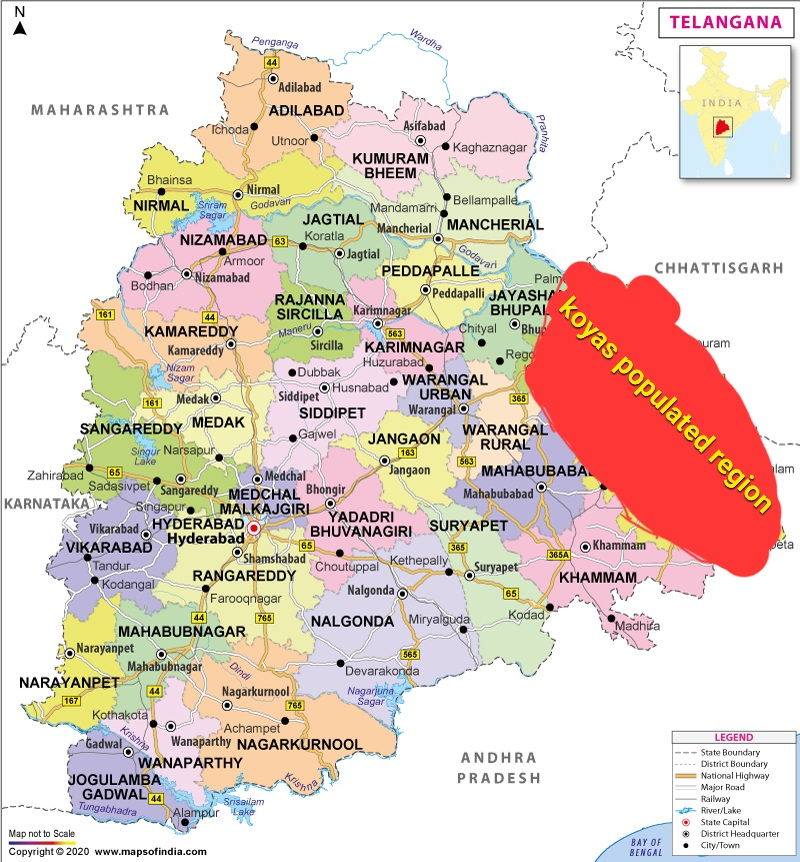
Koya tribe populated in Telangana region.

== Population and livelihood ==
The Koya population is concentrated in northeastern Telangana, northern Andhra Pradesh, far-southern Chhattisgarh and southwestern Odisha. In Telangana they live mainly in Khammam, Bhadradi Kothagudem and Warangal districts and are sparsely found in the old Adilabad and Karimnagar districts. In Andhra Pradesh the Koya mainly live in Alluri Sitharama Raju district, while in Odisha they live almost exclusively and are the dominant tribe in Malkangiri district in the far southwest of the state. in Chhattisgarh they live in the far-southern Bastar region, mainly in the districts of Sukma and Bijapur. The Koya in Andhra Pradesh and Telangana had a population of 590,739 according to the 2011 census. However, many became residents of Andhra Pradesh when their lands became part of Andhra Pradesh during the Polavaram project. There are another 147,137 Koya in Odisha, and approximately 46,978 Dorla (who are a mixed group in-between Gondi and Koya) in Chhattisgarh.

  - Populated agency mandals of Koyas
- Gundala mandal Kothagudem district
- Pakhala Kothaguda mandal
- Gangaram mandal Mahabubabad district
- Gudur mandal Mahabubabad district
- Tadvai mandal Mulugu district
- Mangapet mandal.
- Cherla mandal.
- Karakagudem mandal.
- Pinapaka mandal.
- Palimela Mandal.
- Kannaigudem mandal.
- Allapalli mandal.
- Manuguru mandal.
- Aswaraopeta mandal.
- Bhadrachalam mandal.
- Bhurghampahad mandal.
- Tekulapalli.
- Dummugudem.

According to Edgar Thurston, the Koya were formerly armed soldiers in the service of the various palegars in the region, and the time of his writing, practised podu cultivation. Today the Koya are mainly settled cultivators and artisans, expertise in making bamboo furniture including mats for fencing, dust pans, and baskets. They grow Jowar, Ragi, Bajra and other millets. Tubers and roots such as Tella Chenna Gadda, Kirismatilu and edible green leaves such as Chencheli, Doggali, Gumuru, bacchalakura, gongura, pacchakura, pullakusiru, Thota kura, Boddukura are dietary staples as are curries made from some of these ingredients.

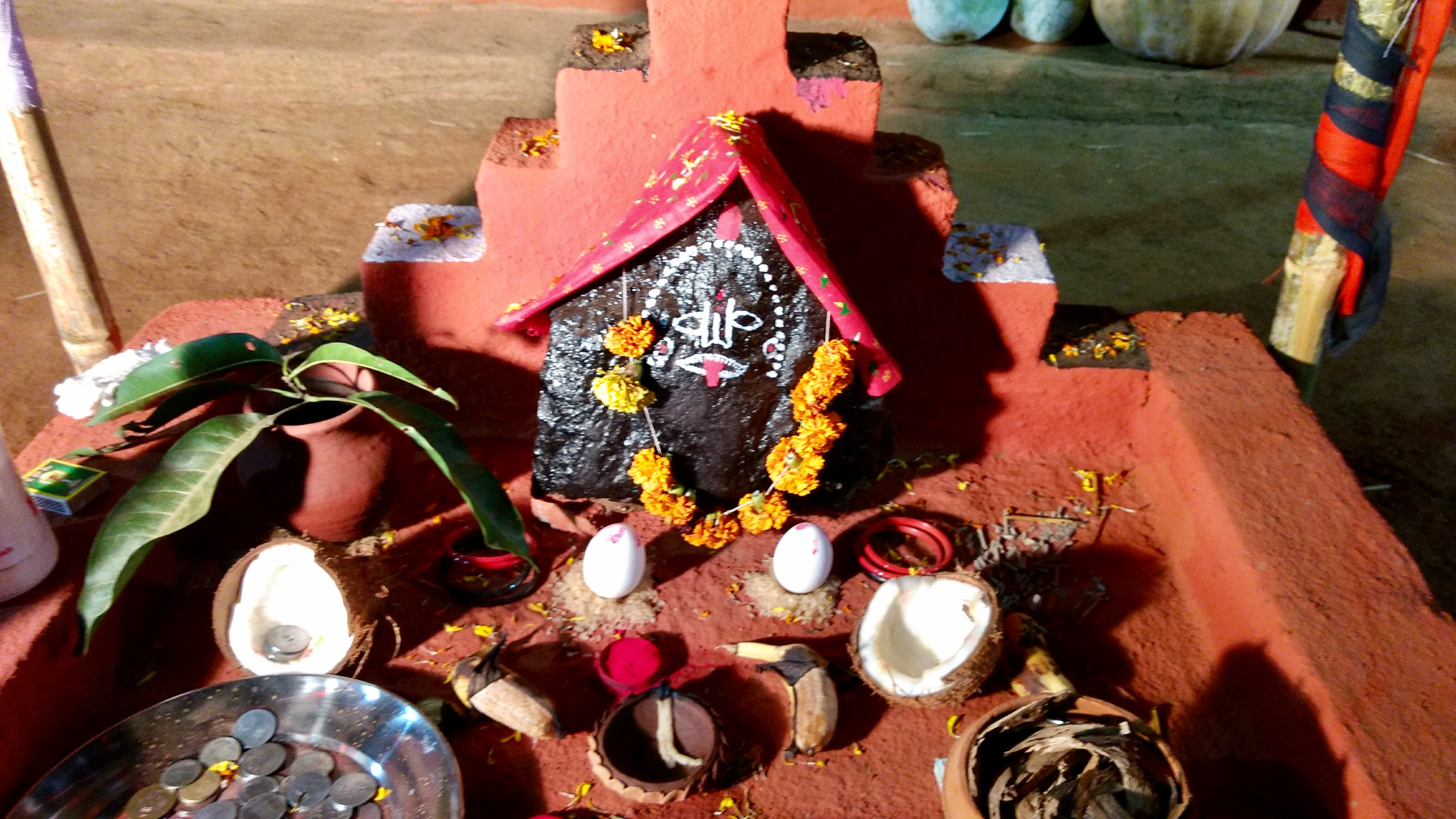
Koya village deity from Malkangiri district at the Odisha state tribal fair, Bhubaneshwar

Koya practice marriage after maturity, and infant marriage is not practised. The bride's maternal uncle has the deciding factor in the match, and cross-cousin marriages are permitted and common. Usually a wealthy groom will have no issues in finding a bride, but if they are poor enough, they can bribe the village headman to allow them to capture the bride. In the most simple Koya wedding ceremony, the bride bends her head and the groom leans over her, while water is poured on the husband's head by friends. Once the water has drained off the bride's head, they are said to be man and wife. They then drink milk, eat rice, and walk around a mound of earth organised under a pandal. They then get elders' blessings and go to their new home.

== Displacement ==
The tribal community faces the new threats of development and conflicts, posing serious questions on its existence and civilisation. For instance, the displacement and migration of Gotti koyas tribals taking place in Andhra Pradesh. In the absence of land and access to a forest, the Koyas depend on wage labour in farm lands. The scarcity of these jobs lead to malnutrition of children and instances of anemia in women. The Andhra Pradesh state government proposed Polavaram Project is posing a serious threat of displacement of 170,275 Koyas of the tribal population and more than 276 villages in the Khammam district of Bhadrachalam, Palwancha divisions.

== Notable people ==
- Jare Adinarayana, MLA from Aswaraopeta Assembly constituency Telangana
- Tellam Balaraju, MLA from Polavaram Assembly Constituency Andhra Pradesh
- Kunja Bojji, MKA from Bhadrachalam Assembly constituency
- Haribhushan, Central Committee member of the CPI (Maoist)
- Koram Kanakaiah, MLA from the Yellandu Assembly Constituency
- Bade Nagajyothi, Chairperson of the Mulugu Zilla Praja Parishad
- Gummadi Narsaiah, MLA from Yellandu Assembly constituency
- Sunnam Rajaiah, MLA from Bhadrachalam Assembly constituency
- Mecha Nageswara Rao, MLA from Aswaraopeta Assembly constituency
- Seethakka, Cabinet Minister for Panchayati Raj & Rural Development, Rural Water Supply, Women and Child Welfare in Government of Telangana, Ex Naxalite
- Podem Veeraiah, MLA from Bhadrachalam Assembly constituency
- Tellam Venkata Rao, MLA from Bhadrachalam Assembly constituency
- Payam Venkateswarlu, MLA from Pinapaka Assembly constituency
- Babu Rao Mediyam, MP from Bhadrachalam (Lok Sabha constituency)

== See also ==
- Sakini Ramachandraih
