= Sukma attack =

Sukma attack may refer to these attacks in Sukma, Chhattisgarh, India during the Naxalite–Maoist insurgency:

- 2013 Naxal attack in Darbha valley
- 2017 Sukma attack
- 2018 Sukma attack
- 2021 Sukma–Bijapur attack
