= Tadmetla =

Village in Chhattisgarh, India

Coordinates: 18°17′N 81°09′E

Tadmetla, also known as Tadmetala, is a village in Chhattisgarh state, India. It is located in the Konta tehsil of Sukma in the Bastar division.

The village is known for its connection with the abduction of Alex Paul Menon of the Indian Administrative Service who was abducted by the Naxals on 21 April 2012 while he was posted as the district collector of Sukma district.
