= 2021 Sukma–Bijapur attack =

Maoist attack in India

Sukma-Bijapur attack
- Part of the Naxalite-Maoist insurgency
| Date | 3 April 2021 |
| Location | Sukma district, Chhattisgarh, Indiag |
| Result | Inconclusive: Security forces raid rebel camp; Rebels capture weapons and equipment from security forces |

Belligerents
| Communist Party of India (Maoist) | India |

Units involved
| | Central Reserve Police Force; Commando Battalion for Resolute Action; District Reserve Guard; Special Task Force |

Strength
| 250 | Unknown |

Casualties and losses
| 20 killed | 22 killed 32 injured |

The 2021 Sukma–Bijapur attack was an ambush carried out by the Naxalite-Maoist militants from the Communist Party of India (Maoist) against Indian security forces on 3 April 2021 at Sukma-Bijapur border near Jonaguda village which falls under Jagargunda police station area in Sukma district of Chhattisgarh, the ensuing gunfight lead to the killing of 22 security personnel as well as 20 Naxalites. The death toll was the worst for Indian security forces fighting the Naxalites since 2017.

On 2 April 2021, separate joint teams of security forces launched a major anti-Maoist operation from Bijapur and Sukma district in the South Bastar forests.

== Background ==
On 23 March 2021, five District Reserve Guard (DRG) personnel were killed and 13 others injured when Maoists blew up a bus carrying the security personnel with an Improvised explosive device in Narayanpur district of Chhattisgarh. The Maoists' group was aided by insurgents associated with the Maoist platoons of Pamed, Konta, Jagargunda, and Basaguda area committees with them nearly 250 in strength.

Security forces had launched an operation after the presence of wanted Maoist leader Hidma in the area. Hidma, a tribal from Puvarti village of Sukma district, who heads the People's Liberation Guerrilla Army’s (PLGA) battalion number 1, is known for deadly ambushes. He joined hands with the rebels in the 1990s and leads around 180 to 250 Maoist fighters, including women. He is a member of the Maoists Dandakaranya Special Zonal committee (DKSZ) and he's also the youngest member of the CPI (Maoists) supreme 21-membered ‘central committee.’ He carries a reward of ₹45 lakh (US$48,000). A charge sheet has been filed against Hidma in the 2019 BJP MLA Bhima Mandavi murder case by the NIA. Hidma is accused in at least 26 attacks, including the 2013 Jhiram Ghati massacre of frontline Congress leaders and Burkapal ambush of April 2017 in which 24 CRPF personnel were killed.

== Attack ==
On 3 April 2021, the security personnel belonging to the Central Reserve Police Force’s elite CoBRA unit, the District Reserve Guard, and the Special Task Force were ambushed in the tribal-dominated central Indian state of Chhattisgarh during an anti-insurgency operation. The fighting ensued when Indian security forces, acting on military intelligence, raided a rebel hideout in a densely forested area of Bijapur district.

At least 22 Indian security personnel were killed and 30 injured in the ambush by Maoist rebels that lasted for four hours in the border Sukma district, 540km (340 miles) south of state-capital Raipur. The insurgents, who had also suffered casualties, had managed to seize the dead soldiers’ weapons. Later, a combing operation to locate one missing soldier was conducted. According to Bhupesh Baghel, chief minister of Chhattisgarh, the gun battle in the state's Bastar division saw the use of "bullets, grenades and rocket launchers" from both sides.

Uddipan Mukherjee, a joint director for the government owned Ordnance Factory Board, said the pandemic had allowed the rebels to recruit more members. Mukherjee has been tracking war strategy of the Maoists for over a decade. His thesis was agreed upon by others who had access to direct knowledge of the situation.

== Reactions ==
=== Domestic ===
Ram Nath Kovind, the President of India expressed deep anguish over the martyrdom of security personnel. Prime minister Narendra Modi and CM of Chhattisgarh Bhupesh Baghel condemned the incident. The Union Home Minister Amit Shah said, "Befitting reply to Chhattisgarh Naxal attack will be given at appropriate time."

=== International ===
Foreign Ministry of Turkey condemned the attack, stating "We are saddened to learn that many Indian security personnel were killed and many left injured after a terrorist act targeting security forces in the state of Chhattisgarh in India,” the Foreign Ministry said in a statement. We offer our sympathies to the relatives of those who lost their lives in the attack and wish a speedy recovery to the injured, the statement read. We condemn this terrorist act, share the grief of the government and people of India and convey our sincere condolences".

== See also ==
- April 2010 Maoist attack in Dantewada
- 2013 Naxal attack in Darbha valley
- 2017 Sukma attack
- 2018 Sukma attack
- 2024 Kanker clash
