= Sukma =

- Town
- Location within Chhattisgarh Location within India
- Coordinates: 18°24′0″N 81°40′0″E
- Country: India
- State: Chhattisgarh
- District: Sukma district
- Elevation: 210 m (690 ft)

Population
  - Total: 13,926

Languages
  - Official: Hindi, Chhattisgarhi
  - Other: Odia, Koya, Gondi, Telugu, Savara
- Time zone: UTC+5:30 (IST)
- PIN: 4941xx (Sukma)
- Telephone code: 07864-284001
- Vehicle registration: CG
- Coastline: 0 kilometres (0 mi)
- Nearest city: Jagdalpur
- Website: http://sukma.gov.in

Sukma is a town in Sukma district in Chhattisgarh, India.

== Geography ==
The coordinates for Sukma are 18°24′0″N 81°40′0″E with an elevation of 210 m above MSL.

== Location ==
Sukma is connected to Jagdalpur by National Highway 30.

== Transport ==
The only transport systems available is road transport. Buses play a major role in public transportation and are available for Raipur, Hyderabad, Bhilai, Bilaspur, Vijaywada, Jagdalpur, Visakhapatnam. Other means of road transport include cars and taxis.

The nearest railroad station is at Dantewada while the nearest airport is in Jagdalpur.

== Naxalite activity ==
Sukma district is a part of the "Red corridor". It is one of the most militarized districts in the country with a deployment of over 10,000 personnel. This region in India is primarily affected by the Naxalite–Maoist insurgency. The region has been under continuous attack by the Maoists who often target police personnel, military forces and political leaders. Some of the most well-known incidents around Sukma during this insurgency include the 2013 Naxalite attack in Darbha valley, the 2017 Sukma attack and the 2018 Sukma attack.
