= Sahdev Dirdo =

Indian musician

- Born: 2007 (age 19); Urmapal, Sukma, Chhattisgarh
- Occupation: Singer
- Instrument: Vocals
- Years active: 2024 present
- Label: Durbeen Music

Sahdev Dirdo is an Indian musician from Sukma, Chhattisgarh who is best known for his song "Bachpan ka Pyar", which got 20 million views in the first 24 hours since its posting. The song was selected as one of the "This Week’s Top 5 Songs" by Outlook India. He has also sung Bella ciao, which went viral. His video in YouTube, which was uploaded by Badshah, has over 515 million views as of 12-08-2024. He also works in Bollywood films.
