= Konta, Chhattisgarh =

Konta
- Model town
- Location within Chhattisgarh Location within India
- Coordinates: 17°48′0″N 81°23′0″E
- Country: India
- State: Chhattisgarh
- District: Sukma

Government
  - Body: Municipal Council
- Elevation: 50 m (160 ft)

Population
  - Total: 7,038

Languages
  - Official: Hindi, Chhattisgarhi
  - Other: Koya, Telugu, Gondi and Hindi
- Time zone: UTC+5:30 (IST)
- Vehicle registration: CG
- Coastline: 0 kilometres (0 mi)

Konta is a Municipal Council and tehsil headquarters in Sukma district, Chhattisgarh, India. Konta is a model town situated near bank of sabri River and Konta Legislative Assembly constituency is one of the 90 Legislative Assembly.

== Geography ==
It is located at 17°48′0″N 81°23′0″E, at an elevation of 50 m above msl.

== Location ==
Konta is connected to Jagdalpur and Vijayawada by the National Highway 221. It is near the state border with Andhra Pradesh. The nearest airport is Jagdalpur Airport.
