= Bastar iron craft =

- Geographical indication
- Type: Handicraft
- Area: Bastar district, Chhattisgarh
- Country: India
- Registered: 2008–2009
- Material: Iron

Bastar iron craft (also known as "wrought iron craft of Baster") is a traditional Indian iron crafts that are manufactured in the Bastar district of Chhattisgarh state, India. The iron-crafting work has been protected under the geographical indication (GI) of the Agreement on Trade-Related Aspects of Intellectual Property Rights (TRIPS) agreement. It is listed at item 82 as "Bastar Iron Craft" of the GI Act 1999 of the Government of India with registration confirmed by the Controller General of Patents Designs and Trademarks.

The iron craft skill is passed through generation to generation in Bastar region. Some tribal communities are experts in iron craft work and many of them became as iron-smiths. Among many communities Gondi and Maria are notable for the traditional iron-crafting.

== See also ==
- Bidriware
- Kinnal Craft
- List of Geographical Indications in India
