= Nagarchal =

Nagarchal (nāgarcāl) may refer to:

- Nagarchal language, an unattested language formerly spoken in parts of central India
- Nagarchal dialect, a dialect of the Dhundari language of Rajasthan, India
- Nagarchal region, a subregion of Dhundhar in Rajasthan, India, centred on the town of Nagar
