= Dorla people =

Tribal people in central India

The Dorla, also called Dora, are a tribal people community found mainly in Bastar area of central India. They are mainly found in the Dantewada and Bijapur districts of present-day Chhattisgarh state.

== Social status ==
Anthropological Survey of India has undertaken a study of Dorla tribe in 1957 and collected details of the tribe in The Dorla of Bastar. They were earlier known as Dor Koi or Dora Koi and as it indicated a slightly inferior status in the society, they gradually changed the name to Dora or Dorla. They usually undertake agricultural activities and live simply in forested areas and mostly illiterate and have a strong belief in supernatural powers and witchcraft. They also worship native gods or goddess like Mutta-lamma, Gangamma, Gaman, Kiror etc. and follow Hindu tradition. They speak Dorli or Dorla language, which is a Dravidian language and a dialect of Koya language.

== Reformation ==
Dorla people used to collect forest produces like tendu leaves which is used to manufacture beedi and harassed by forest contractors while trading tendu leaves and some members of tribe like Bhadranna joined Maoist groups to fight for justice to their community. Bhadranna fought with Maoists and returned to mainstream after his surrender but several others still continue.

Dorla people are very united.
