= 2013 Naxal attack in Darbha valley =

2013 attack of a government convoy by Naxalite insurgents in Sukma, Chhattisgarh, India

Coordinates: 18.85°N 81.86°E

2013 Naxal attack in Darbha Valley
- Part of Naxalite-Maoist insurgency
- Darbha valley (Chhattisgarh) Location of Darbha Valley in India
- Location: Darbha Valley, Sukma district, Chhattisgarh, India
- Date: 25 May 2013; 04.00 pm (UTC+5.30)
- Target: Indian National Congress leaders
- Attack type: Landmine blast and firing
- Weapons: Guns and landmine
- Deaths: 32
- Injuries: 32
- Victims: Mahendra Karma; Nand Kumar Patel; Vidya Charan Shukla; Uday Mudaliyar; Phulo Devi Netam
- Perpetrator: Around 250 Maoist Naxalites

On 25 May 2013, Naxalite insurgents of the Communist Party of India (Maoist) attacked a convoy of Indian National Congress leaders in the Jhiram Ghati, Darbha Valley in the Sukma district of Chhattisgarh, India. The attack caused at least 27 deaths, including that of former state minister Mahendra Karma and Chhattisgarh Congress chief Nand Kumar Patel. Vidya Charan Shukla, a senior Congress leader, succumbed to his injuries on 11 June 2013.

== Background ==
Sukma district is a part of the "red corridor" in eastern India, the belt affected by the Naxalite–Maoist insurgency. This region has been under continuous attack by the Maoists, who have been targeting police personnel and political leaders. The then Union Home Minister P Chidambaram had proposed to carry out a counter-offensive in the entire Bastar region but had to call off because of opposition from party leaders including Digvijaya Singh and some members of the National Advisory Council headed by Sonia Gandhi. Naxalites had called for a bandh on 25 and 26 May 2013 to protest 17 May 2013 operation against them by the security forces during an anti-Naxalite operation in which eight tribals were also killed, including three children. Naxalites were also protesting the conduct of "Vikas Yatra" of the Government and the "Parivartan Yatra" of the opposition Indian National Congress party.

Maoists carry out a campaign called "Tactical Counter Offensive Campaign" (TCOC) which runs from April to early Monsoon in July. The thick Dharba forests provided them with good cover to carry out hit and run attacks. Congress leaders were warned about the possibility of an attack during their yatra. Later investigations revealed that Raman Singh Government's Vikas Yatra was also set as a target during his 7 May 2013 visit. However the plan could not succeed. Naxalites were enraged with the mobilisation of 2500–3000 security force personnel in the region in the then recent times. Their central commission hence allowed them to target the Parivartan Ralley.

== Attack ==
Leaders of the Indian National Congress were carrying out a Parivartan Yatra ("Change" Rally) in the state, with a convoy of 25 vehicles carrying around 200 Congress leaders and workers. They were returning from a meeting organised in Sukma and were headed to Keshloor nearby Jagdalpur along National Highway 221 which connects Chhattisgarh with Krishna district in the adjacent state of Andhra Pradesh and hold its last rally there. Almost all the senior state party leaders; former Union Minister Vidya Charan Shukla, former state minister Mahendra Karma, Nand Kumar Patel, Uday Mudaliyar, senior Congress leader Gopi Madhwani, and prominent woman tribal leader Phulo Devi Netam from Bastar were present.

=== Blast ===
As the convoy reached the deeply forested area of Dharba valley on Jagdalpur-Sukma Highway, 50 km from its destination, it found the road blocked by trees that had been cut down by Maoists. The Maoists triggered an IED near the fourth vehicle in the convoy, completely damaging the vehicle and leaving a five-metre wide crater in the ground. In an attempt to flee, several vehicles collided with each other. The blast was carried out by a bomb using 27–30 kg of explosive using ammonium nitrate and electric detonators with command wire used to trigger the blast. Investigators also found 200-meter long wires used to detonate the explosive which had been planted a few feet under the road.

=== Firing ===
As the vehicles slowed down, around 250 Maoists hiding in the adjoining hilltops of the JEERUM hills opened fire from both the sides. The personal security officers of the Congress leaders took positions and tried to defend them; the firing continued for over 90 minutes. The Maoists waited for the PSOs to run out of ammunition before asking the Congress leaders to surrender. The Maoists, however, started firing indiscriminately when the Congress leaders emerged from their vehicles. Eyewitness said that when the Maoists struck, the mobile phones of all the leaders were also taken, as the attackers asked the names of the leaders, shooting some of them while leaving others alone .

== Victims ==
Around 28 people were killed in the attack which included twelve Congress leaders and workers, eight police and CRPF jawans and four other villagers. There was crossfire between Mahendra Karma's guards and the Naxalites, but when his defenders ran out of bullets, Karma surrendered along with various other Congress leaders. Naxalites then asked Congress leaders there to identify him. Karma came forward and identified himself. Naxalites then took him away and beat him. They then stabbed him several times and sprayed him with bullets, and then beat him again about the head with the butts of their guns. They also raised the slogans Mahendra Karma Murdabad ("death to Mahendra Kumar"). Autopsy revealed that 78 stab wounds were found on his body, which were made with a blunt object.

MLA Uday Mudliyar, former MP and Gopal Madhavan were among the others killed in the gun fire. Vidya Charan Shukla sustained three bullets wounds, and was among several others who were critically injured. He died on 11 June 2013 after being treated at Medanta Medicity Hospital Gurgaon. Nand Kumar and Dinesh jumped out of the car; the two were found dead a day later. Following the attack, the Naxals abducted Patel, his son and few other leaders. Around 6 pm, they asked others to leave except Patel and his son. Their bodies were later recovered from the forest at the ambush site. Autopsy revealed that Dinesh Patel had an axe injury on his head and it led to his death. Nandkumar Patel was also stabbed multiple times and there were also bullet wounds. At least ten security personnel, all of them personal security officers of Congress leaders, were also gunned down.

According to eyewitnesses, Vidya Charan Shukla's Personal Security Officer, Prafulla Shukla, shot himself with the last bullet he was left with after the shootout, apologising and regretting that he could not protect him.

Congress worker Yogendra Sharma was also killed.

== Survivors ==
However, many people of the convoy survived and some were released by Naxalites. Kawasi Lakhma, a Congress MLA from Konta constituency in Bastar, who was part of convoy that was attacked and was kidnapped along with Patel and his son was later released by Naxalites. Lakhma asserted that he climbed up the valley and found the motorbike of a local TV journalist who was trying to film the happenings from a hilltop. Ajit Jogi, the ex-Chief Minister of Chhattisgarh, did not join the convoy as he was supposed to; he was provided a helicopter to travel as he was handicapped. Some of the survivors walked to Darbha town 12 km away, contacted police and party workers, then ferried the injured first to Darbha and later to Jagdalpur.

== Perpetrators and planning ==
A Maoist issued a four-page media statement, signed by Gudsa Usendi on behalf of spokesperson for the Dandakaranya Special Zonal Committee, CPI (Maoist), taking full responsibility for the attack, and narrated it as the punishment for Salwa Judum founder Mahendra Karma. The statement said that Karma was the prime target of the attack along with state Congress leader Nand Kumar Patel. Though they expressed regret over the killing of low Congress functionaries and other innocents. The Maoist-Naxalites who carried out the attack were the members of the Dhand Karineya Special Zonal Committee (DKSZC). "Pandu", who had taken over as the 'Divisional Commander' of DKSZC after Ganesh Uike was removed, is believed to be the behind the attack. The initial firing on the convoy was through country-made weapons and later the Maoists used automatic weapons. Eyewitness said that when the Maoists struck, the mobile phones of all leaders were also snatched. The attacking Naxalites included a large number of women, and they kept communicating on their wireless sets during the operation.

Investigators believe the attack was carried out by Maoists belonging to Andhra Pradesh and Odisha, with a small contingent of Maoists from Chhattisgarh in the outer ring. Investigations reportedly revealed that a group of 40 to 50 Maoists had been camping in the area near the blast site for five days before the attack. They recced the site and also visited the local market several times. In the note, the rebels also put forward seven key demands. They demanded to end the Operation Green Hunt and to withdraw the paramilitary forces from the Dandakaranya region. They also demanded the unconditional release of the Naxal revolutionaries and "innocent" tribals from jail.

Investigators said that after the attack, the Maoists divided themselves into two groups and moved towards Odisha. One of the groups was reportedly spotted in Gupteshwar in Koraput.

== Rescue operation and reactions ==
Darbha police station was at a distance of 10 km and a major CRPF camp was also nearby. However their way was blocked by trees that the Naxalites knocked down. It took security reinforcements several hours to reach the spot, as they had to walk carefully, for fear that land mines had been planted on the road leading to the area. This is because in past, it has been seen that Maoists plant mines in and around the area of attacks to target security forces rushing for rescue and relief operations. Prime Minister Manmohan Singh reviewed the situation with Congress President Sonia Gandhi and other senior leaders. The PM called up chief minister Raman Singh to offer para-military reinforcements. Raman Singh had returned to Raipur, cancelling his Vikas Yatra, to hold an emergency meeting of the state cabinet. A three-day state mourning was declared and all those who died in the attack were given a state funeral.

Injured were admitted in the Maharani Medical College in Jagdalpur. Critically injured Shukla was shifted to Raipur and then airlifted to Medanta Hospital in Gurgaon. Other injured were later brought to Ramkrishna Care hospital in Raipur. Manmohan Singh, Sonia Gandhi, Rahul Gandhi, Raman Singh and other leaders went to hospital to meet the injured.

The Centre rushed more than 600 CRPF personnel, including the CoBRA anti-Maoist commandos, to sanitise and take control of the Naxal attack site in Chhattisgarh. The Centre has mobilised the CRPF personnel to not only take control of the area but also launch search and rescue operations as it is suspected that some people may be present in nearby jungles. Pranay Sahay, the Director General of CRPF, later told media that "the paramilitary force has put its best men on the job to track the "retreating steps" of the Maoists who carried out the deadly attack last week killing 27 people including state PCC chief Nand Kumar Patel and another prominent leader Mahendra Karma." According to media, the Additional Director General of the Border Security Force was stationed in Odisha to chase the Maoists who carried out the attack.

The Prime Minister announced ₹ 500,000 each as ex-gratia relief from the National Relief Fund for families of those killed and ₹ 50,000 each for those injured. Chief Minister Raman Singh announced a separate ₹ 500,000 ex-gratia to the families of those killed, additionally asserting that the country will never bow before Naxalism. While addressing party workers at Congress Bhavan in Raipur he said, "We will pursue the perpetrators of this crime with urgency and I can assure the nation that the Government is committed to bringing them to justice." President Pranab Mukherjee said the nation will neither be overawed nor intimidated by such actions. Leader of Opposition in Loksabha, Sushma Swaraj condemned the attacks and termed it to be shocking and most unfortunate.

Rural Development Minister Jairam Ramesh said that the Maoist-Naxalites had no faith whatsoever in the political system, democracy, electoral politics and constitutional values and all the talk of tribal welfare for them is a sham and is an excuse, and an alibi for perpetrating the violent overthrow of a democratic system. He said that Government shall "intensify" the development works in the 20–25 most affected districts. He also ruled out the possibility of talk with the Maoists stating that it was not the time to talk with them.

== Post attack measures and investigation ==
Following a request from the Chhattisgarh government which sought more forces to provide security to political leaders as well as to engage in anti-Naxal operations, Central Government sent 2,000 additional paramilitary force personnel to the state.

Union Home minister Sushilkumar Shinde ordered an investigation by the National Investigation Agency. It reached the state on 27 May 2013 and began its probe to find out possible lapses on the part of the central forces or the state government. Union Ministry of Home Affairs also sent an advisory to all the Naxal-hit states asking them to thoroughly review the security of political leaders – both national and regional parties and, if necessary, their protection should be upgraded. As one such measure, Chief Minister, Raman Singh was provided on the following day with Z+ protection with National Security Guard commandos.

The Indian Air Force initiated the up gradation of its surveillance capacity in Maoist-hit areas after the failure of unmanned aerial vehicles (UAVs) operating in the attack region.

The Chhattisgarh government also appointed a one-man commission under Chhattisgarh High Court judge Justice Prashant Mishra for a judicial enquiry into the attack. The commission would submit the report in three months. A special session of the Chhattisgarh Legislative Assembly was also called on 3 June 2013 to discuss the Naxal issue.

On 5 September 2026, a special NIA court in Bastar convicted all 10 accused involved in this case. All 10 accused were sentenced to death by the special court on 16 September 2026.

== Encounter in Salaikota reserve forest ==
On 14 September 2013, 14 Maoist cadres were shot by the Special Operation Group (SOG) at the Salaikota reserve forest (35 km from Malkangiri) in South Odisha. These Maoists were believed to be responsible for the attack on the Congress leadership in Chhattisgarh, and had entered Malkangiri district from Chhattishgarh. The operation was performed by SOG with an intelligence input and the "BSF personnel in the background."

== See also ==
- 2021 Sukma-Bijapur attack
- April 2010 Maoist attack in Dantewada
- Timeline of the Naxalite–Maoist insurgency
