= Pardhan language =

Gondi language of India

Pardhan
- Pradhan
- Native to: India
- Region: Madhya Pradesh, Maharashtra, Telangana
- Ethnicity: Pardhan
- Native speakers: 140,000 (2007)
- Language family: Dravidian: South-Central; Gondi–Kui; Gondi languages; Pardhan
- Writing system: Devanagari

Language codes
- ISO 639-3: pch
- Glottolog: pard1245

Pardhan (or Pradhan, IPA: [pɐrdʱaːn, prɐdʱaːn]) is a dialect of Gondi spoken by the Pardhan people, a community who are the traditional bards of the Gonds. Its speakers are found in areas where the Gonds live: southeastern Madhya Pradesh, far-eastern Maharashtra and northern Telangana. Approximately 140,000 people speak this dialect. Glottolog lists it as 'unattested'.
