= Sakini Ramachandraih =

Indian vocal folk singer and Dhol player (1963–2024)

- Born: 1 January 1963; Bhadrachalam, Andhra Pradesh, India
- Died: 23 June 2024 (aged 61) near Manuguru, Telangana, India
- Occupation: Singer

Sakini Ramachandraih (1 January 1963 – 23 June 2024) was an Indian vocal folk singer and Dhol player from the Bhadradri town in the Telangana State in India. He was known for his expertise in "Kanchumelam-Kanchuthalam" an art form particularly identified with the Koya tribal community in Telangana and Andhra Pradesh. This art form is almost on the verge of extinction and Ramachandraih was the only surviving practitioner of the art who could narrate the history of the sacred festival "Sammakka Sarakka Jathara" in both the Telugu and Koya languages in its totality. In the year 2022, the Government of India honoured Ramachandraiah by conferring the Padma Shri award for his contributions to art.

== Life and work ==
Sakini Ramachandraih was born in Bhadradri, Kottagudem District, Manuguru Zone, Koonavaram in Telangana to the Koya tribe couble Musalayya-Gangamma on 1 January 1963. He had no formal education and he remained an illiterate throughout his life. However, from the age twelve, he showed a passion for the art of playing Dhol which, probably, he had inherited from his grandparents. The Koya tribal artistes have a great tradition of orally handing over their repertoire of songs to newer generations and Ramachandraih memorised a large collection of these songs. The themes of these songs include stories of tribal warriors such as Sammakka-Saralamma, Girikamaraju, Pagididda Raju, Ramaraju, Gadiraju, Bapanamma, Musalamma, Nagulamma, Sadalamma, etc. They also include stories of the birth of tribes and family histories. The artistes play an important role in festivals and in important days like marriage day in Koya houses.

The art practised by Ramachandraih is also known "Kanchumelam-Kanchuthalam" and is almost on the verge of extinction. Ramachandraih was the only surviving practitioner of the art who could narrate the history of "Sammakka Sarakka Jathara" (also known as "Sammakka Saralamma Jatara" or "Medaram Jatara") festival in both the Telugu and Koya languages in its totality.

Ramachandraiah’s talent came to wider attention for the first time in 2014 when he narrated the history of Sammakka-Saralakka, two tribal women (mother and daughter) who fought against Kakatiya rulers in the 13th century. "It became an instant hit. He has also popularized other ballads such as Boponamma Katha, Godi Kama Roaju Katba, etc." said Jayadheer Tirumala Rao, a retired professor of Telugu University, who recorded and documented Ramachandraiah’s oral narratives.

Ramachandraih died in his home village, near Manuguru, on 23 June 2024, at the age of 61.

== Padma Shri award ==
- In the year 2022, the Government of India conferred the Padma Shri award, the third highest award in the Padma series of awards, on Ramachandraiah for his distinguished service in the field of art. The award is in recognition of his service as a "Koya tribal singer from Bhadradri - amongst the last preserving the ancient practice of reciting the oral histories of the Koya tribe".

== See also ==
- List of Padma Shri award recipients (2020–2029)
