= Gondoid languages =

- Geographic distribution: Throughout Central India, mostly Madhya Pradesh and Chhattisgarh, Maharashtra, Andhra Pradesh, Telangana, Uttar Pradesh, Assam, Odisha
- Ethnicity: Gonds
- Linguistic classification: Dravidian: South-Central; Gondi–Kui; Gondoid languages
- Subdivisions: Gondi; Muria; Koya; Madiya; Khirwar?

Language codes
- Glottolog: gond1265

The Gondoid languages are a subgroup of the indigenous family that includes Gondi and related languages. Gondi proper is the most widely spoken language, with over 10 million speakers. Other languages in this subgroup include Muria, Madiya, and Koya. It is undetermined whether Pardhan is a separate language or a dialect of Gondi, although current fieldwork suggests it is a dialect. Khirwar is a poorly-attested language spoken by people in the general Gond area, and so is assumed to be related to Gondi.

== Internal classification ==
Glottolog classifies the Gondoid languages as follows:

- Gondoid
  - Northwest Gondi
    - Northern Gondi
    - Southwest Gondi
      - Muria 15,864 (2011 census)
        - Eastern Muria
        - Western Muria
      - Southern Gondi
        - Adilabad Gondi
        - Eastern Gondi
          - Aheri Gondi
          - Far Western Muria
  - Southeast Gondi
    - Madiya (365,000 cited 2000)
    - South Bastar Gondi‑Koya
      - Dandami Madiya
      - Koya 455,000 (2011)
  - Khirwar? 26,000 (2011 census)
  - Nagarchal? († extinct)
  - Pardhan? 140,000 (2007)
