= Gallery G =

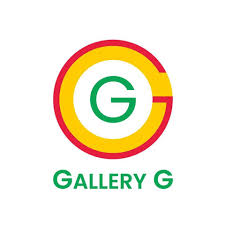

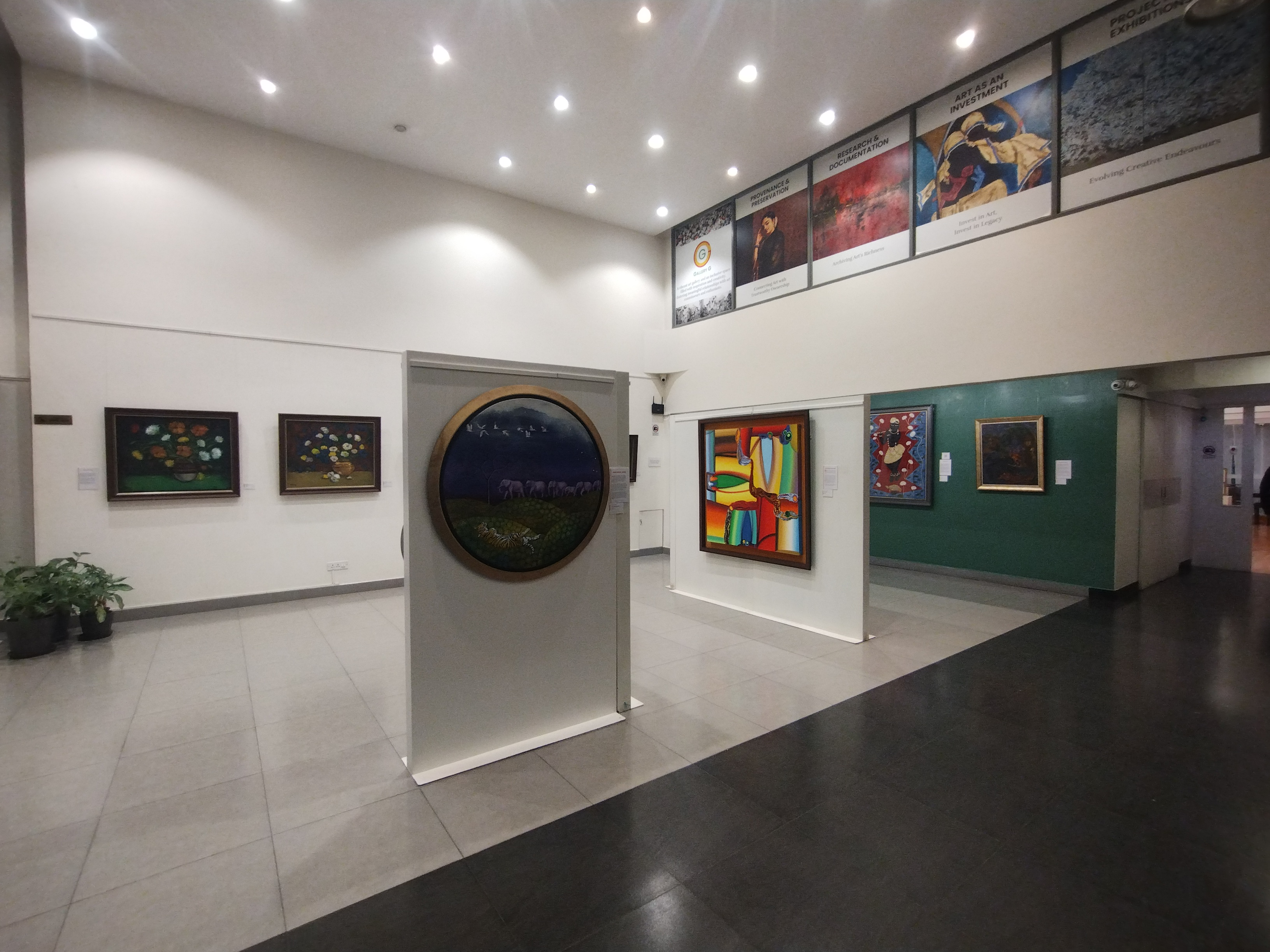
- Gallery G in 2025
- Established: 2003
- Location: Bangalore
- Coordinates: 12.974135°N 77.598862°E
- Type: Art gallery/museum
- Founder: Gitanjali Maini
- Owners: Sandeep & Gitanjali Maini Foundation
- Website: galleryg.com

Gallery G is an Indian art gallery and resource based in Bangalore. It provides informed access to art and consultancy services for investors, architects, interior designers and organizes traveling art shows.

Gallery G was founded in 2003, by Gitanjali Maini.

== Media gallery ==
Gallery G in 2025
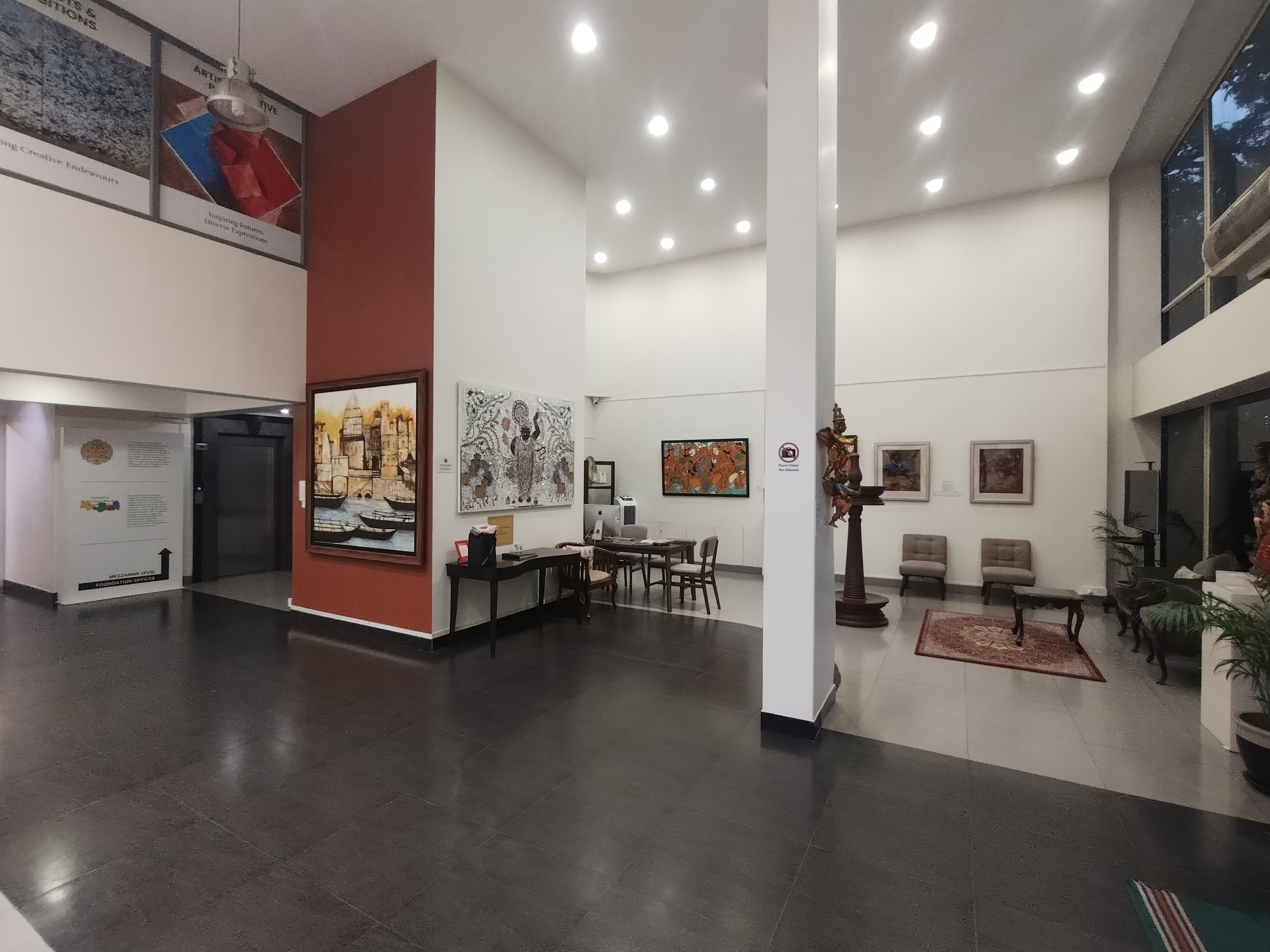
Interiors of the museum

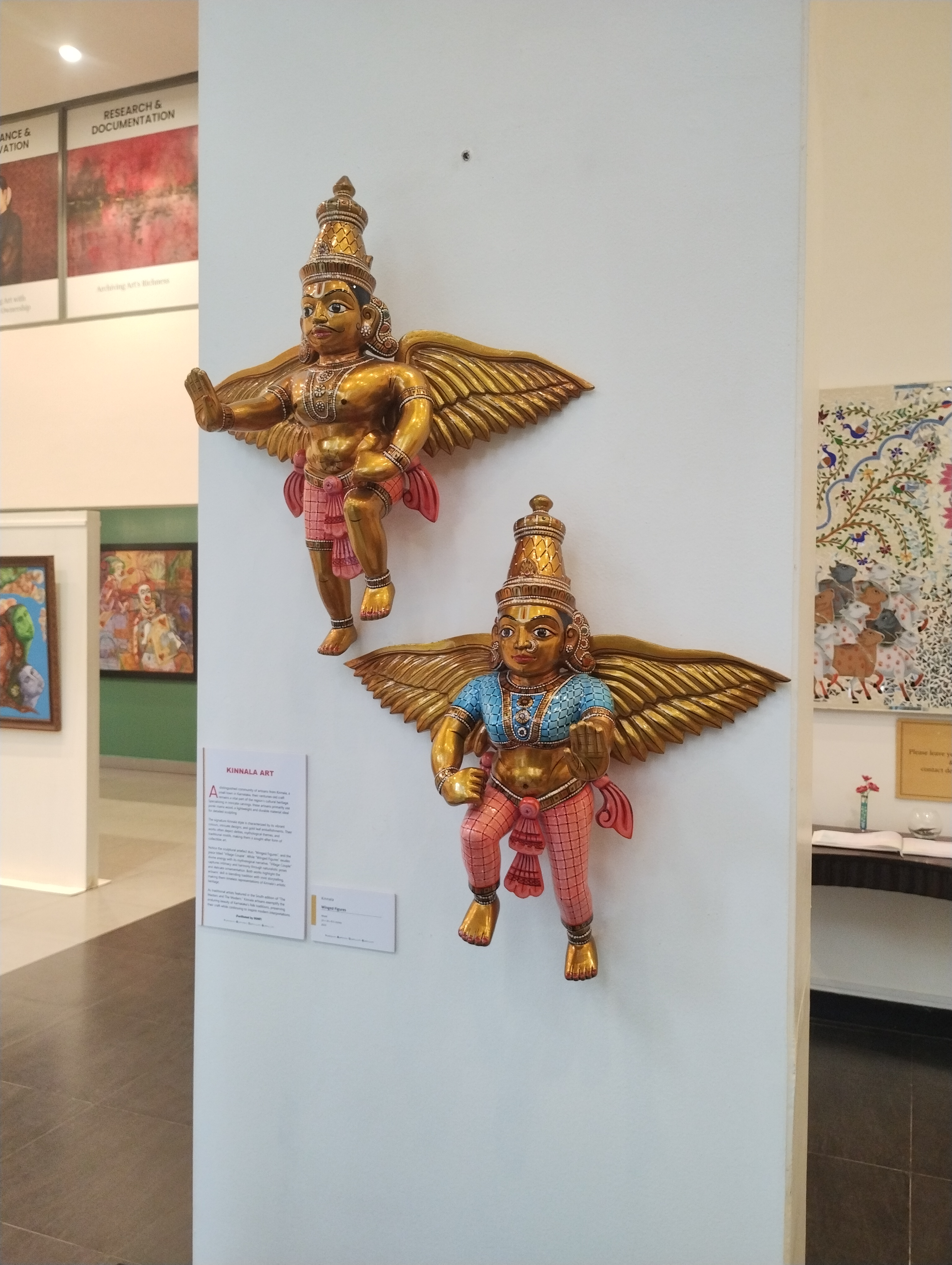
Kinnala art in the museum

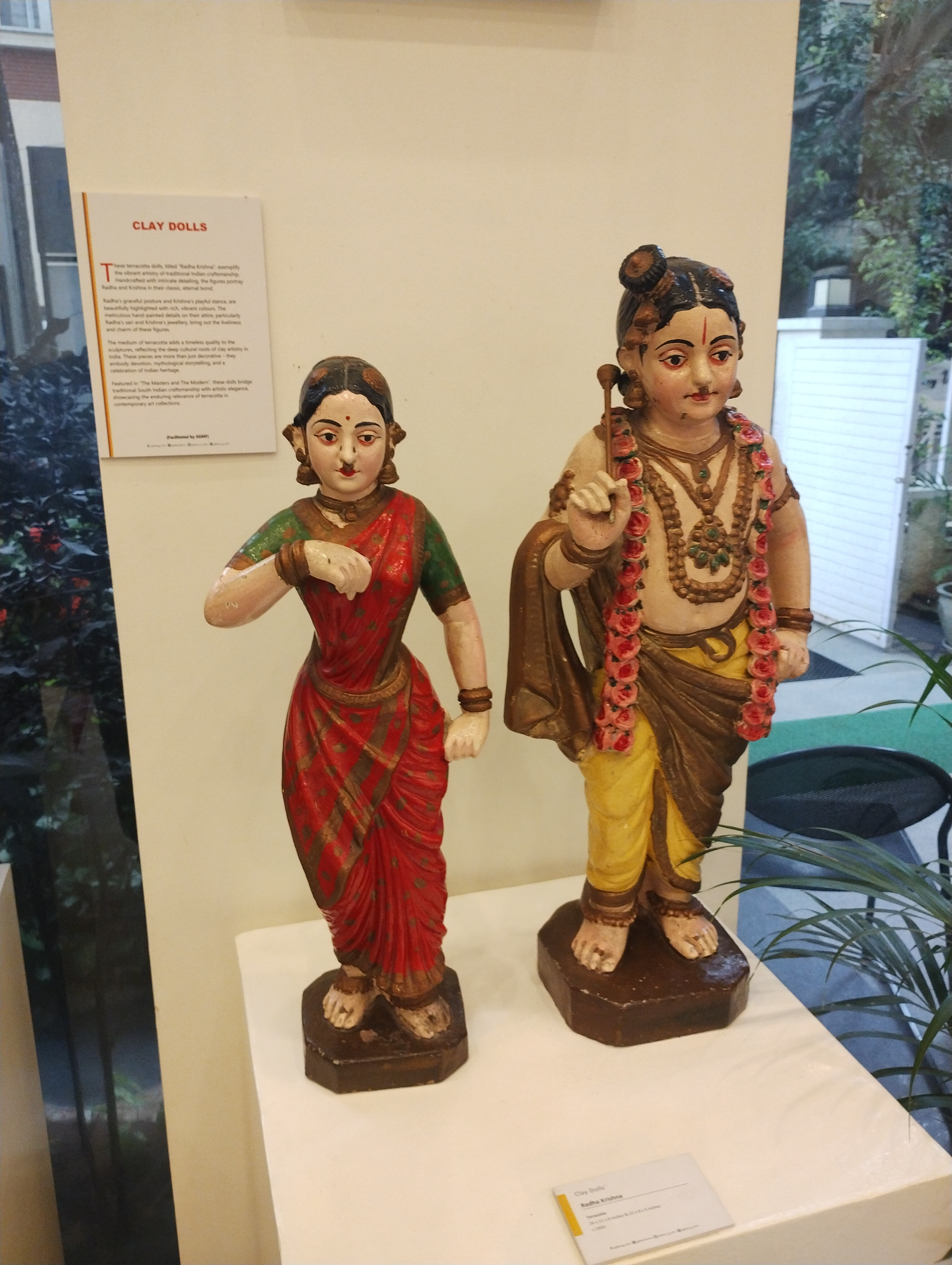
Sculptures of Sri Radha Krishna in the museum

Audio-visual projection of book: Raja Ravi Verma (Portrait of an artist)
