= Kunja Bojji =

Indian politician (1926–2021)

Kunja Bojji కు౦జా బొజ్జి

Member of the Andhra Pradesh Legislative Assembly
- In office 1985–1999
- Preceded by: Yerraiah Reddi Murla
- Succeeded by: Sunnam Rajaiah
- Constituency: Bhadrachalam, Andhra Pradesh

Personal details
- Born: 10 February 1926 Adavi
- Died: 12 April 2021 (aged 95) Venkannagudem, Khammam District, Andhra Pradesh
- Party: Communist Party of India (Marxist)
- Spouse: Subbalakshmi

Kunja Bojji (10 February 1926 – 12 April 2021) was an Indian politician belonging to the Communist Party of India (Marxist). He represented the Bhadrachalam seat in the Andhra Pradesh Legislative Assembly between 1985 and 1999. He belonged to the Koya community.

Kunja Bojji was a courier for guerrillas during the Telangana armed struggle of the 1950s. In the 1970s he joined the CPI(M) and was elected a samiti member. In 1985 he, along with two other CPI(M) leaders was ambushed by Naxalites and his companions were killed.

In the 1985, 1989 and 1994 elections to the Andhra Pradesh Legislative Assembly he was elected with 42.37%, 50.82% and 62.55% vote share respectively.

Bojji died from COVID-19 in 2021.
