= Bhadrachalam Assembly constituency =

Constituency of the Telangana legislative assembly in India

Coordinates: 17.67°N 80.90°E

Bhadrachalam
- Constituency No. 119 for the Telangana Legislative Assembly
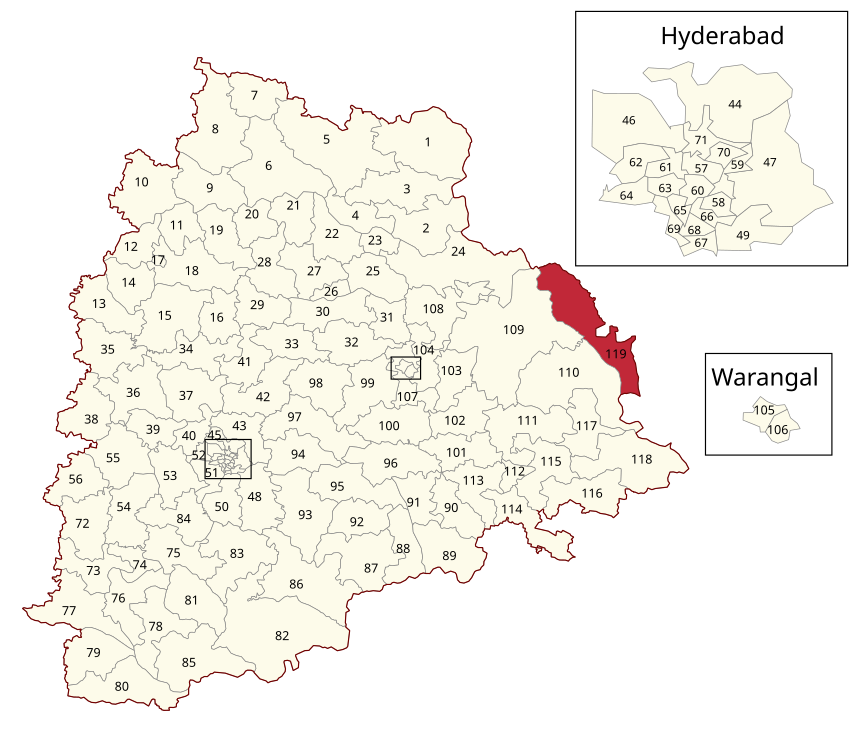
- Location of Bhadrachalam Assembly constituency within Telangana

Constituency details
- Country: India
- Region: South India
- State: Telangana
- District: Bhadradri Kothagudem, Mulugu
- Lok Sabha constituency: Mahabubabad
- Established: 1951
- Reservation: ST

Member of Legislative Assembly
- 3rd Telangana Legislative Assembly
- Incumbent Tellam Venkatarao
- Party: Indian National Congress
- Elected year: 2023

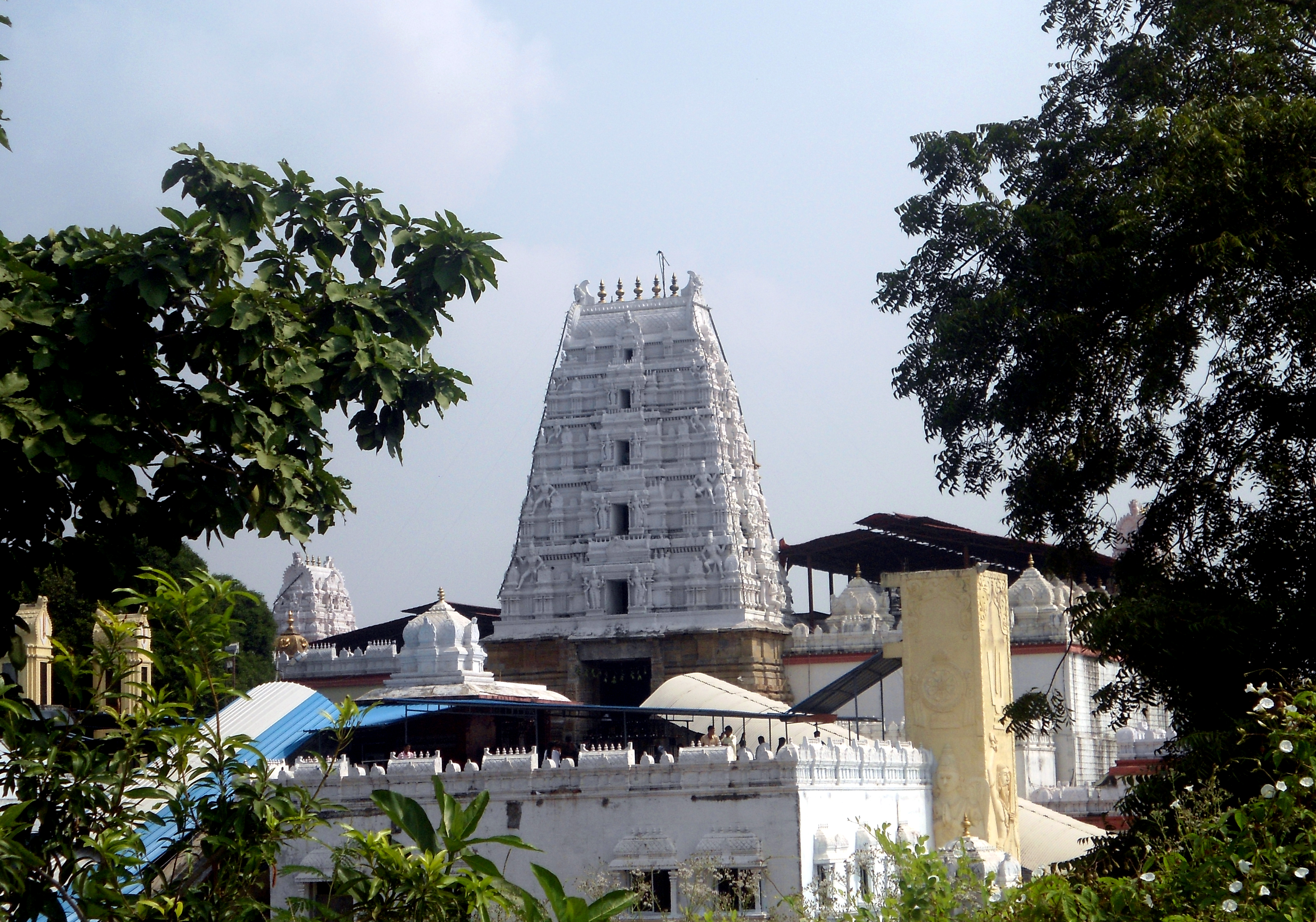
A view of Bhadrachalam Gopuram from Yogananda Narasimha Swamy temple

Bhadrachalam Assembly constituency is a ST reserved constituency of Telangana Legislative Assembly, India. It includes the temple town of Bhadrachalam. It is one among constituencies in Bhadradri Kothagudem district and Mulugu district. It is part of Mahabubabad Lok Sabha constituency.

== Mandals ==
The Assembly Constituency presently comprises the following Mandals:

Mandal	Districts
Wazedu	Mulugu
Venkatapuram	Mulugu
Cherla	Bhadradri Kothagudem
Dummugudem	Bhadradri Kothagudem
Bhadrachalam	Bhadradri Kothagudem

== Members of the Legislative Assembly ==
Year	member	Party
Madras State
1952	Y. Venkata Krishna Rao	Kisan Mazdoor Praja Party
1952	Karam Bapanna Dora	Kisan Mazdoor Praja Party
Andhra State
1955	Mahammad Tahseel	Communist Party of India
1955	Syamala Seetharamaiah	Communist Party of India
United Andhra Pradesh
1957	P. V. M. Rao	Indian National Congress
1962	Mahammad Tahseel	Communist Party of India
1967	K. K. Dora	Indian National Congress
1972	Matta Ramachandraiah	Indian National Congress
1978	Yerraiah Reddy Murla	Communist Party of India (Marxist)
1983	Yerraiah Reddy Murla	Communist Party of India (Marxist)
1985	Kunja Bojji	Communist Party of India (Marxist)
1989	Kunja Bojji	Communist Party of India (Marxist)
1994	Kunja Bojji	Communist Party of India (Marxist)
1999	Sunnam Rajaiah	Communist Party of India (Marxist)
2004	Sunnam Rajaiah	Communist Party of India (Marxist)
2009	Kunja Satyavathi	Indian National Congress
Telangana Legislative Assembly
2014	Sunnam Rajaiah	Communist Party of India (Marxist)
2018	Podem Veeraiah	Indian National Congress
2023	Dr. Tellam Venkata Rao	Bharat Rashtra Samithi

== Election results ==
Vote share of Winning candidates
2023	45.08%
2018	43.23%
2014	34.78%
2009	35.76%
2004	48.22%
1999	39.22%
1994	62.55%
1989	50.82%
1985	42.37%
1983	37.02%
1978	36.04%
1972	43.48%
1967	48.16%
1962	53.74%
1957	51.34%
1955	34.82%
1955	33.42%
1952	26.45%
1952	25.62%

=== 2023 ===
2023 Telangana Legislative Assembly election: Bhadrachalam (ST)
Party	Candidate	Votes	%	±%
BRS	Dr. Tellam Venkata Rao	53,252	45.08	
INC	Podem Veeraiah	47,533	40.24	
CPI(M)	Karam Pullaiah	5,860	4.96	
IND	Marmam Thirupathamma	2,083	1.76	
BJP	Kunja Dharmarao	1,931	1.63	
NOTA	None of the Above	1,672	1.42	
IND	Nakka Saibabu	1,327	1.12	
BSP	Irpa Ravikumar	1,303	1.10	
IND	Ubba Seetharamulu	823	0.70	
IND	Pandra Hemasundar	588	0.50	
OTH	4 Other Party Candidates	1,757	1.49	
Majority		5,719	4.84	
Turnout		118,129		
Swing to BRS from INC		Swing		

=== 2018 ===
2018 Telangana Legislative Assembly election: Bhadrachalam (ST)
Party	Candidate	Votes	%	±%
INC	Podem Veeraiah	47,746	43.23	
TRS	Tellam Venkata Rao	35,961	32.56	
CPI(M)	Midiyam Babu Rao	14,228	12.88	
IND	Pandra Hemasundar	4,523	4.10	
NOTA	None of the Above	2,106	1.91	
BJP	Kunja Satyavathi	1,824	1.65	
PPOI	Ramesh Babu Bhukya	1,119	1.01	
IND	Chele Anusha	835	0.76	
RPI	Punem Pradeep Kumar	816	0.74	
IND	Karam Naveen	698	0.63	
BSP	Gundu Sarath Babu	589	0.53	
Majority		11,785	10.67	
Turnout		110,445	80.41	
Swing to INC from CPI(M)		Swing		

=== 2014 ===
2014 Andhra Pradesh Legislative Assembly election: Bhadrachalam (ST)
Party	Candidate	Votes	%	±%
CPI(M)	Sunnam Rajaiah	57,750	34.78	
TDP	K. P. R. K. Phaneeswaramma	55,935	33.69	
INC	Kunja Satyavathi	22,061	13.29	
TRS	Mane Ramakrishna	8,728	5.26	
IND	Venkata Ramana Sunnam	5,267	3.17	
NOTA	None of the Above	2,499	1.50	
BSP	Kamaraju Irpa	2,152	1.30	
IND	Somini Venkata Purushotham	2,039	1.23	
IND	Payam Venkaiah	1,929	1.16	
JSP	Gondi Venkateswarlu	1,642	0.99	
PPOI	Bhukya Parvathi	1,425	0.86	
IND	Marmam Lakshmi Devi	1,156	0.70	
IND	Kunja Dulaiah	1,100	0.66	
IND	G. Chandra	903	0.54	
IND	Vislavath Swaroopa Ramu	893	0.54	
IND	Pandra Hema Sundar	570	0.34	
Majority		1,815	1.09	
Turnout		166,049	76.60	
Swing to CPI(M) from INC		Swing		

=== 2009 ===
2009 Andhra Pradesh Legislative Assembly election: Bhadrachalam (ST)
Party	Candidate	Votes	%	±%
INC	Kunja Satyavathi	51,466	35.76	
CPI(M)	Sunnam Rajaiah	45,083	31.33	
PRP	Gundu Sarath Babu	28,245	19.63	
IND	Payam China Rama Rao	6,136	4.26	
BJP	Som Raju Parsika	3,574	2.48	
BSP	Gote Dana Lakshmi	3,046	2.12	
IND	Karam Narasimha Rao	2,518	1.75	
LSP	Puli Pitchaiah	2,372	1.65	
IND	Etti Aswapathi	1,468	1.02	
Majority		6,383	4.43	
Turnout		143,908		
Swing to INC from CPI(M)		Swing		

=== 2004 ===
2004 Andhra Pradesh Legislative Assembly election: Bhadrachalam (ST)
Party	Candidate	Votes	%	±%
CPI(M)	Sunnam Rajaiah	64,888	48.22	
TDP	Sode Ramaiah	50,303	37.38	
TRS	Gondi Nagarjuna Madhusudhana Rao	3,816	2.84	
MCPI(S)	Murla Ramesh	3,057	2.27	
IND	Sonde Veeraiah	10,074	7.49	
IND	Chichadi Srirama Murthy	2,432	1.81	
Majority		14,585	10.84	
Turnout		134,570		
CPI(M) hold		Swing		

=== 1999 ===
1999 Andhra Pradesh Legislative Assembly election: Bhadrachalam (ST)
Party	Candidate	Votes	%	±%
CPI(M)	Sunnam Rajaiah	46,058	39.22	
TDP	Chichadi Sreerama Murthy	39,709	33.82	
INC	Dungroth Suseela	30,550	26.02	
AJBP	Attam Raghupathi	685	0.58	
NCP	B. A. Tilak	427	0.36	
Majority		6,349	5.40	
Turnout		123,704	74.60	
CPI(M) hold		Swing		

=== 1994 ===
1994 Andhra Pradesh Legislative Assembly election: Bhadrachalam (ST)
Party	Candidate	Votes	%	±%
CPI(M)	Kunja Bojji	71,768	62.55	
INC	Sode Bhadraiah	32,503	28.33	
SAP	Ubba Satyam	3,467	3.02	
MCPI	Yerraiah Reddy Muria	2,619	2.28	
BJP	Bhaskara Rao Tusti	2,568	2.24	
IND	Peethala Vaniramana Rao	1,140	0.99	
BSP	Aswapathi Yetti	663	0.58	
Majority		39,265	34.22	
Turnout		118,141	73.45	
CPI(M) hold		Swing		

=== 1989 ===
1989 Andhra Pradesh Legislative Assembly election: Bhadrachalam (ST)
Party	Candidate	Votes	%	±%
CPI(M)	Kunja Bojji	48,217	50.82	
INC	Dungurothu Suseela	40,441	42.63	
IND	Koyyala Venkateswara Rao	2,383	2.51	
IND	Kurusamu Achaiah	1,955	2.06	
MCPI	Miurla Yerraiha Reddy	1,878	1.98	
Majority		7,776	8.19	
Turnout		100,742	67.34	
CPI(M) hold		Swing		

=== 1985 ===
1985 Andhra Pradesh Legislative Assembly election: Bhadrachalam (ST)
Party	Candidate	Votes	%	±%
CPI(M)	Kunja Bojji	30,337	42.37	
INC	Bhadrayya Sode	23,634	33.01	
IND	Karama Ramachandraiah	9,176	12.82	
IND	Chidem Gopalakrishna Murthy	4,469	6.24	
IND	Nagamani Vummadisetti	2,965	4.14	
IND	Lakshmayya Kalam	1,012	1.41	
Majority		6,703	9.36	
Turnout		73,712	61.05	
CPI(M) hold		Swing		

=== 1983 ===
1983 Andhra Pradesh Legislative Assembly election: Bhadrachalam (ST)
Party	Candidate	Votes	%	±%
CPI(M)	Yerraiah Reddi Murla	22,416	37.02	
IND	Aswapathi Yetti	19,671	32.49	
INC(J)	Turram Podiyan Dora	8,567	14.15	
INC	Vani Ramana Rao Pethala	8,205	13.55	
IND	Alam Laxmaiah	1,695	2.80	
Majority		2,745	4.53	
Turnout		62,545	57.42	
CPI(M) hold		Swing		

=== 1978 ===
1978 Andhra Pradesh Legislative Assembly election: Bhadrachalam (ST)
Party	Candidate	Votes	%	±%
CPI(M)	Yerraiah Reddy Murla	21,006	36.04	
INC(I)	Pusam Tirupathaiah	18,660	32.01	
INC	Matta Ramachandraiah	18,622	31.95	
Majority		2,346	4.03	
Turnout		61,171	62.75	
Swing to CPI(M) from INC		Swing		

=== 1972 ===
1972 Andhra Pradesh Legislative Assembly election: Bhadrachalam (ST)
Party	Candidate	Votes	%	±%
INC	Matta Ramachandraiah	19,209	43.48	
CPI(M)	Murla Yerraiah Reddy	14,122	31.96	
CPI	Nura Bojji	9,164	20.74	
ABJS	Chinnabbi Karam	1,688	3.82	
Majority		5,087	11.52	
Turnout		47,082	59.69	
INC hold		Swing		

=== 1967 ===
1967 Andhra Pradesh Legislative Assembly election: Bhadrachalam (ST)
Party	Candidate	Votes	%	±%
INC	K. K. Dora	16,855	48.16	
CPI(M)	S. Sitaramayya	9,919	28.34	
CPI	S. Ramayya	4,962	14.18	
IND	P. Muthayya	3,259	9.31	
Majority		6,936	19.82	
Turnout		38,647	57.99	
Swing to INC from CPI		Swing		

=== 1962 ===
1962 Andhra Pradesh Legislative Assembly election: Bhadrachalam
Party	Candidate	Votes	%	±%
CPI	Mahammed Tahaseel	17,146	53.74	
INC	Pithala Vani Ramana Rao	8,862	27.78	
IND	Chentalacheruvu Venkatadri	4,168	13.06	
IND	Tellam Ghana Samuel Sundar Rao	1,730	5.42	
Majority		8,284	25.96	
Turnout		34,502	56.74	
Swing to CPI from INC		Swing		

=== 1957 ===
1957 Andhra Pradesh Legislative Assembly election: Bhadrachalam
Party	Candidate	Votes	%	±%
INC	P. V. M. Rao	16,665	51.34	
CPI	S. Ramayya	15,793	48.66	
Majority		872	2.69	
Turnout				
Swing to INC from CPI		Swing		

=== 1955 ===
1955 Andhra State Legislative Assembly election: Bhadrachalam
Party	Candidate	Votes	%	±%
CPI	Mahammad Tahseel	27,102	34.82	
CPI	Syamala Seetharamaiah	26,012	33.42	
KSP	Karam Bapanna Dota	12,647	16.25	
KSP	Yellapeddy Venkatakrishna Rao	12,082	15.52	
Turnout		77,843	74.62	
Registered electors		1,04,322		
CPI gain from KMPP		Swing		

=== 1952 ===
1952 Madras Legislative Assembly election: Bhadrachalam
Party	Candidate	Votes	%	±%
KMPP	Karam Bapanna Dora	31,912	26.45	
KMPP	Y. Venkata Krishna Rao	30,905	25.62	
INC	Varsavyi Venkata Tirupathi Raju	18,637	15.45	
INC	Sivasam Bojji Dora	18,396	15.25	
KLP	K. Rami Reddi	11,249	9.32	
KLP	Sstyam Pendyala	9,551	7.92	
Turnout		1,20,650	78.34	
Registered electors		1,54,004		
KMPP win (new seat)				

== See also ==
- List of constituencies of the Telangana Legislative Assembly
