= Khirwar language =

Dravidian language of Chhattisgarh, India

Khirwar
- Native to: India
- Native speakers: 26,000 (2011 census)
- Language family: Dravidian: South-Central?; Gondi–Kui?; Gondi languages?; Khirwar

Language codes
- ISO 639-3: kwx
- Glottolog: khir1237

Khirwar (IPA: [kʰirwaːr], also called Khirwara, Kherwari, or Kalari) is a Dravidian language spoken by the Kharwar tribe in Surguja district of Chhattisgarh in India. Glottolog has labeled it as unclassified within the Dravidian group.
