= 2017 Sukma attack =

Ambush carried out by the Communist Party of India (Maoist)

Sukma attack
- Part of the Naxalite-Maoist insurgency
Date	24 April 2017
Location	Sukma district, India
Result	Maoist victory

Belligerents
Communist Party of India (Maoist)	India

Units involved
	Central Reserve Police Force

Strength
300	99

Casualties and losses
3 killed	26 killed

The Sukma attack was an ambush carried out by the Communist Party of India (Maoist) against Indian paramilitary forces on 24 April 2017, during the Naxalite-Maoist insurgency. It was the largest ambush since a similar attack in 2010, in the neighbouring district of Dantewada.

The ambush took place between Burkapal and Chintagufa in Sukma district of Chhattisgarh, India. A group of 300 Maoists attacked a 99-member troop of the Central Reserve Police Force. Three Maoists and 25 police personnel were killed in the ensuing firefight.

== See also ==
- April 2010 Maoist attack in Dantewada
- 2013 Naxal attack in Darbha valley
- 2021 Sukma-Bijapur attack
- 2024 Kanker clash
