= Tellam Venkata Rao =

Indian politician (born 1970)

Dr. Tellam Venkata Rao

Member of Legislative Assembly Telangana
- Incumbent
- Assumed office 3 December 2023
- Preceded by: Podem Veeraiah
- Constituency: Bhadrachalam

Personal details
- Born: 25 January 1970 (age 56) Chinabadevu, Dummugudem Mandal, Bhadradri Kothagudem district, Telangana, India
- Party: INC
- Other political affiliations: BRS
- Spouse: Praveena
- Children: Nikitha, Rishitha
- Occupation: Politician, Doctor

Dr. Tellam Venkata Rao is an Indian politician who is currently serving as a member of the Telangana Legislative Assembly from Bhadrachalam since 23 December 2023.

== Potitical career ==
Tellam Venkata Rao started his political journey after resigning to his government medical post in 2014 and joined YSR Congress Party and contested as MP from Mahabubabad Lok Sabha constituency and lost. He later joined TRS party and served as State Secretary of the Telangana Rashtra Samithi. Venkata Rao contested the 2018 assembly elections as a TRS candidate from Bhadrachalam constituency and lost to Congress Candidate Podem Veeraiah with a margin of 11,785 votes. He quit the Bharat Rashtra Samithi (BRS) and joined the Congress party in July 2023 ahead of 2023 Assembly Elections and returned to the BRS in August 2023 as he is not sure of getting ticket from the Congress for the Bhadrachalam seat.

Tellam Venkata Rao contested the 2023 Assembly election from the Bhadrachalam and won by a margin of 5,719 votes, defeating Congress candidate Podem Veeraiah. He later joined the Ruling Congress party on 7 April 2024 in the presence of TPCC president and Chief Minister A.Revanth Reddy and Revenue Minister Ponguleti Srinivas Reddy.
