= Sunnam Rajaiah =

Indian politician (1960–2020)

Sunnam Rajaiah సున్నం రాజయ్య

Member of the Telangana Legislative Assembly
- In office 2014–2018
- Preceded by: Kunja Satyavati
- Succeeded by: Podem Veeraiah
- Constituency: Bhadrachalam

Member of the Andhra Pradesh Legislative Assembly
- In office 1999–2009
- Preceded by: Kunja Bojji
- Succeeded by: Kunja Satyavati
- Constituency: Bhadrachalam

Personal details
- Born: 8 August 1960 Sunnamvarigudem village, Khammam district, Andhra Pradesh (now in East Godavari district)
- Died: 4 August 2020 (aged 59)
- Party: Communist Party of India (Marxist)
- Children: 2

Sunnam Rajaiah (8 August 1960 – 4 August 2020) was an Indian politician from Telangana.

== Career ==
He was elected as a Member of Legislative Assembly of Andhra Pradesh in 1999, 2004 and 2014 as a CPI(M) candidate. In 2009 election he lost the seat to his opponent Kunja Satyavati by 6956 Votes.

Rajaiah died from COVID-19 on 4 August 2020, four days short of his 60th birthday during the COVID-19 pandemic in India.

== See also ==
- Bhadrachalam (Lok Sabha constituency)

== External References ==
- Details of Sunnam Rajaiah Affidavit submitted for 2004 Andhra Pradesh State Assembly Elections
