= Wazedu =

Administrative division in Telangana, India

Coordinates: 18°32′32″N 80°29′58″E

- Mandal
- Interactive map of Wazedu
- Country: India
- State: Telangana
- District: Mulugu

Languages
  - Official: Telugu
- Time zone: UTC+5:30 (IST)
- Vehicle registration: TG 37
- Climate: hot (Köppen)

Wazed, Wazedu or Wazeed is a mandal in Mulugu district of Telangana. Previously, Wazedu belonged to Nugur Taluka of East Godavari District.

== Demographics ==
According to Indian census, 2001, the demographic details of Wazeed mandal is as follows:

- Total Population: 23,545 in 5,690 Households.
- Male Population: 11,753 and Female Population: 11,792
- Children Under 6-years of age: 3,516 (Boys - 1,787 and Girls - 1,729)
- Total Literates: 9,889

== Villages ==
The villages in Wazeed mandal include:

- Cherukur
- Chintoor
- Edjarlapalli
- Gummadidoddi
- Kongala
- Krishnapuram
- Murmur
- Nagaram
- Peruru
- Wazeed
- Chandrupatla
- lingapeta
- China Gangaram
- Tekulagudem
