= Muria language =

Dravidian language spoken in India

Muria
- Native to: India
- Native speakers: 15,864 (2011 census)
- Language family: Dravidian: South-Central; Gondi–Kui; Gondi languages; Muria

Language codes
- ISO 639-3: Variously: emu – Eastern Muria mut – Western Muria fmu – Far Western Muria (Gaita Koitor)
- Glottolog: muri1262 Muria proper farw1235 Far Western

Muria (IPA: [murija]) is a Dravidian language spoken in India. Three varieties have mutual intelligibility. It is sometimes confused with the Madiya language. It is suspected to be mutually unintelligible with northern Gondi dialects.

== Phonology ==
Muria has 10 vowels and 21 consonants.

Consonants
		Bilabial	Dental	Alveolar	Retroflex	Palatal	Velar	Glottal
Nasal		m		n			ŋ	
Stop	voiceless	p	t̪		ʈ	t͡ʃ	k	
Stop	voiced	b	d̪		ɖ	d͡ʒ	g	
Fricative				s				h
Tap or Flap				ɾ	ɽ			
Approximant		ʋ		l	ɭ	j		

Vowels
	Front		Central		Back	
	short	long	short	long	short	long
High	i	iː			u	uː
Mid	e	eː			o	oː
Low			a	aː		
