= Nagarchal language =

Dravidian language spoken in India

Nagarchal
- (unattested)
- Native to: India
- Region: Madhya Pradesh
- Ethnicity: Nagarchi
- Extinct: 1981
- Language family: Dravidian ?: South-Central ?; Gondi–Kui ?; Gondi languages ?; Nagarchal

Language codes
- ISO 639-3: nbg
- Glottolog: naga1399

Nagarchal (Nagarchal pronunciation: [naːɡɐrt͡ʃaːl]) is an unattested extinct language of central India, presumed to be Dravidian. According to the 1971 census, there were 7,100 speakers of the language, but they have since apparently shifted to Hindi and Gondi. The Nagarchi people, who formerly spoke it, are found in the Balaghat, Chhindwara, Jabalpur, Mandla and Seoni districts of Madhya Pradesh.

In an interview, Nagarchis said that their language was purani bhasha, which means "old language", that they shifted to Hindi and Gondi 15 to 20 years ago, and they do not use the language even in the home domain at present. They said the language is very different from Hindi but close to Gondi, implying it is likely a Gondic language. The researchers attempted to collect Nagarchi wordlists from many areas, but this was not possible, as even elders were not able to provide wordlists in the Nagarchi language.
