= 2018 Sukma attack =

Bomb attack in India

Sukma attack
- Part of the Naxalite-Maoist insurgency
Date	13 March 2018
Location	Sukma district, India

Belligerents
Communist Party of India (Maoist)	India

Units involved
	Central Reserve Police Force (CRPF)

Strength
100	

Casualties and losses
	9 killed 6 wounded

On 13 March 2018, at least nine Central Reserve Police Force (CRPF) personnel were killed and six others were injured when Maoists blew up a mine-protected vehicle with an IED in Sukma district, Chhattisgarh, India.

== Background ==
The attack came almost eleven days after Indian security personnel killed 10 alleged Naxalites in the forests of Chhattisgarh's Bijapur district on 2 March. It also came almost a year after at least 25 CRPF personnel were killed in one of the deadliest attacks by Maoist rebels.

== Incident ==
On 13 March 2018, an IED blast occurred when a contingent of CRPF's 212th battalion was patrolling in a mine-protected vehicle in the forest of Kistaram area in Sukma district, Chhattisgarh. At least nine Central Reserve Police Force personnel were killed and six others were injured in the attack. The blast ripped the vehicle apart and some dead bodies were found 20 to 30 feet away from the blast site. The injured were airlifted for treatment in Raipur.

According to Special Director General CRPF D. M. Awasthi, "There were about 11 men in the vehicle. A patrolling party was going from Kistaram to Palodi in an anti-landmine vehicle which was targeted by Naxals with an IED". He said that, "they were only 1km from the nearest camp in Palodi". According to him, "there is an exchange of fire almost on a daily basis. The security forces have been running an aggressive campaign against Naxalites".

The security forces are trying to figure out if the attack was carried out by a single group of Naxals or multiple.

== Arrests ==
Seven individuals, identified by authorities as Komram Sade, Madkam Joga, Madkam Hindwa, Mandvi Sukka, Madkam Ganga, Vanjam Aayta and Vanjam Singha, have been arrested and are being investigated on suspicion of involvement with the attack. Athhorities assert that all seven members of the "Jan Militia". All are residents of Kistram in Sukma.

== Reaction ==
Indian President Ram Nath Kovind in a tweet expressed anguish at the attack and saluted the CRPF personnel who lost their lives. He also offered condolences to the bereaved families and stated that, "we remain firm in our resolve to take on and defeat all forms of terrorism".

Indian Prime Minister Narendra Modi in a tweet saluted the CRPF personnel who were killed in the attack and said that, "the nation stands shoulder to shoulder" with the families and friends of those killed "in this hour of grief".

Indian Home Minister Rajnath Singh expressed distress in a tweet. He also expressed condolences to the families of those who lost their lives in Sukma blast and prayed for the speedy recovery of the injured. He further stated that, "I spoke to DG CRPF regarding the Sukma incident and asked him to leave for Chhattisgarh".

Chief Minister of Chhattisgarh Raman Singh condemned the "cowardly attack".

Congress President Rahul Gandhi tweeted that the attack mirrors a "deteriorating internal security situation due to flawed policies". He called the attack "tragic" and expressed condolences to the families of those killed and wished speedy recovery to those injured.
