= Podem Veeraiah =

Indian politician (born 1966)

Podem Veeraiah (born 2 January 1966) is an Indian politician from Telangana state. He is a three time MLA from Bhadrachalam Assembly constituency which is reserved for ST community in Bhadradri Kothagudem district. He represented Indian National Congress party and won the 2018 Telangana Legislative Assembly election.

== Early life and education ==
Veeraiah is from Mulugu, Mulugu district, Telangana. His is born to Sammaiah and Radha Bai. He completed his intermediate in 1984 at Government High School, Mulugu, Hanamkonda. He married Podem Padma and they have a son and a daughter.

== Career ==
Veeraiah won from Bhadrachalam Assembly constituency representing Indian National Congress in the 2018 Telangana Legislative Assembly election. He polled 47,746 votes and defeated his nearest rival Tellam Venkata Rao of Telangana Rashtra Samithi by a margin of 11,785 votes.

Earlier, he became an MLA for the first time winning the Mulug Assembly constituency in the 1999 Andhra Pradesh Legislative Assembly election. He defeated Azmeera Chandulal of Telugu Desam Party by a margin of 14,555 votes. He retained Mulug seat representing Indian National Congress in the 2004 Assembly election for the second time defeating Anasuya Danasari (Seethakka) of Telugu Desam Party by a margin of 14,594 votes. But had to wait till 2018 to win again. However, contesting on Congress ticket, he lost the 2023 Telangana Legislative Assembly election to Dr. Tellam Venkata Rao of BRS by a margin of 5,719 votes.
