= Commando Battalion for Resolute Action =

Indian specialized police unit of CRPF

Commando Battalion for Resolute Action (CoBRA)
- CoBRA Insignia
- Abbreviation: CoBRA
- Motto: "Saṃgrāmeṃ parākramī jyī" "Victory for gallant in war"

Agency overview
- Formed: 12 September 2008

Jurisdictional structure
- Operations jurisdiction: India
- Legal jurisdiction: India
- Primary governing body: Central Reserve Police Force
- Secondary governing body: Ministry of Home Affairs (India)

Operational structure
- Headquarters: Directorate General, Central Reserve Police Force, New Delhi
- Active personnels: 10,000
- Agency executive: Sanjukta Parashar, IPS, Inspector General, CoBRA
- Parent agency: Central Reserve Police Force

Notables
- Person: K. Vijay Kumar; Sanjukta Parashar
- Anniversary: 12 September 2008

Website
- crpf.gov.in

CoBRA (backronym for Commando Battalion for Resolute Action) is a special operation unit of the Central Reserve Police Force (CRPF) of India proficient in guerrilla tactics and jungle warfare. Originally established to counter the Naxalite movement, CoBRA is deployed to address insurgent groups engaging in asymmetrical warfare. Numbering ten battalions as of 2011, CoBRA is considered to be one of the most experienced and successful commando formation in the country.

== Background ==
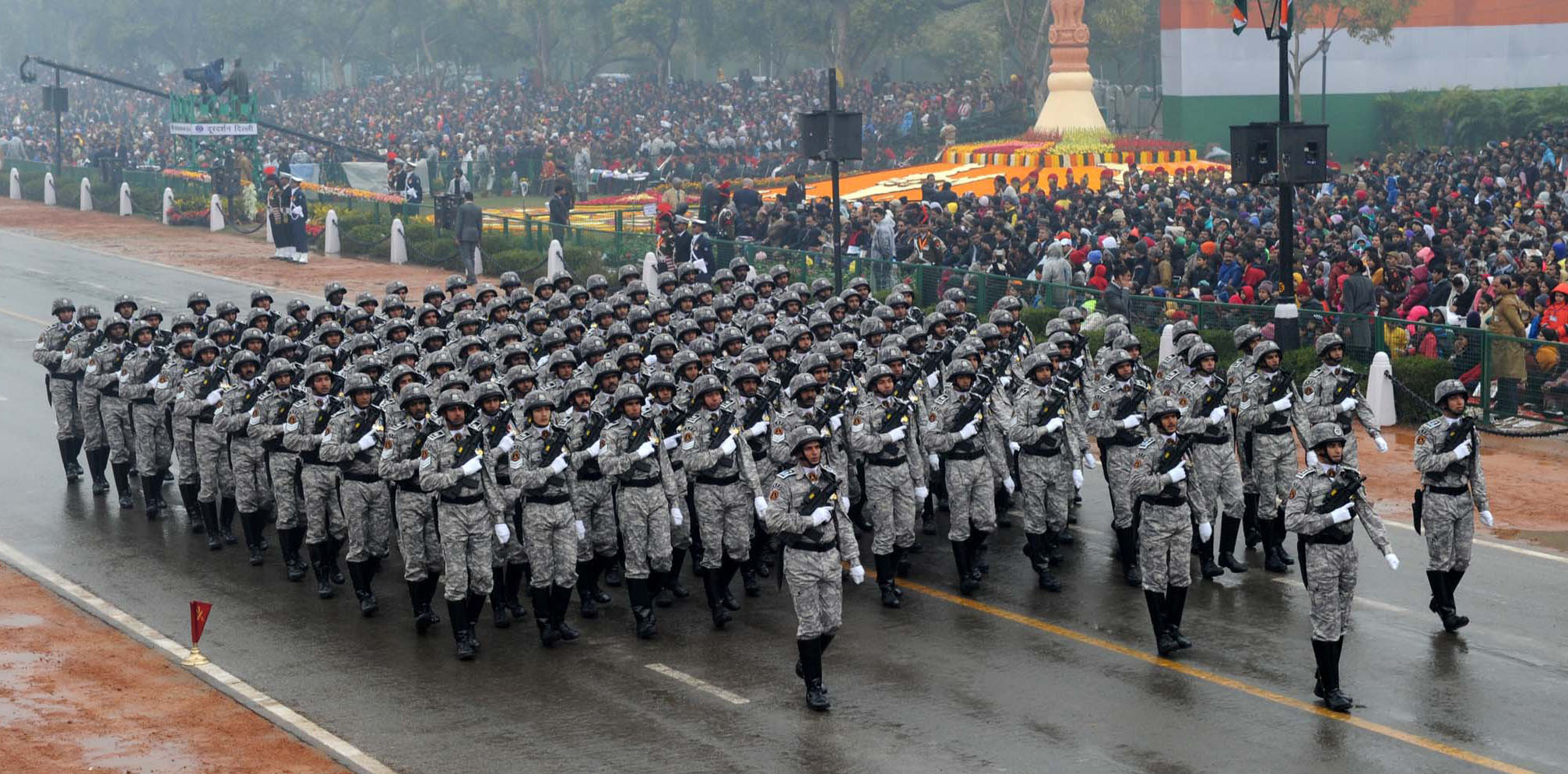
CRPF (CoBRA) personnel during the Republic Day Parade, 2015.

In 2009, the MHA approved the raising of 10 CoBRA (Commando Battalion for Resolute Action) to meet the challenges posed by the Naxal rebels. The unit was initially raised to counter the Naxal insurgents in the Red Corridor. The regiment initially started off with 2 battalions, in 2009, followed by the raising of another 8 battalions in 2 years.

CoBRA Battalions are trained to conduct operations against insurgents in all manners of rugged terrain. The highly efficient personnel are chosen from the CRPF and are conditioned with rigorous physical endurance, and taught the planning and execution of operations, GPS and map reading, gathering of intelligence, and Fast-Roping amongst other activities. The highly efficient personnel are trained and specialized in various fields including but not limited to guerrilla warfare, explosive tracking and bomb disposal, field engineering, survival, and jungle warfare.

Special intelligence courses have been conducted by intelligence agencies to train troops in intelligence gathering. To maintain the uniformity of standards and the evolution of a unique ethos, as well as the training of troops. A dedicated CoBRA school of jungle warfare & tactics is in the works.

The founder of CoBRA, DIG K.V. Madhusudhanan, spoke about the CoBRA's unit's rules of engagement in an interview. "The Maoist menace is a grievance-driven movement and ideology-driven insurgency. Hence, CoBRA would require new tactical doctrines, skills and resources. While the Maoist struggle is total—no time limit or fixed geographical target—CoBRA had to operate under limitations of law. There were no drawn lines of conflict, and CoBRA had to account for every person apprehended, injured or killed. The extremists have no such liabilities."

Since its inception, the unit has been successful in the taking down of 61 Naxals, and the apprehension of 886 more. They have also recovered vast amounts of ammunition dumps, along with arms and explosives. The CoBRA personnel's efforts have also been acknowledged with more than 200 commendation disc(s) from the DG CRPF.

== Awards and honours ==
The valour and gallant actions of CoBRA have been recognised, and the unit has been decorated with multiple Gallantry medals, including -

- 1 Kirti Chakra
- 8 Shaurya Chakra
- 6 PPMG
- 250 PMG
- 189 Parakram Padak
- 6 Jeevan Raksha Padak
- 13578 Antarik Suraksha Padak
- 3339 DG Commendation Disc

1986 was the year when No. 88 Mahila Battalion, CRPF was raised, earning the distinction of being the first all-women battalion in the world. In 2021, 34 personnel from the hallowed ranks of the CRPF were selected to form an all-women CoBRA battalion.

== Bases ==
Battalion	City	Geo-Location
201 CoBRA Battalion	Karanpur, Chhattisgarh	
202 CoBRA Battalion	Sunabeda, Koraput, Odisha	
203 CoBRA Battalion	Hazaribagh, Jharkhand	
204 CoBRA Battalion	Masgaon, Chhattisgarh	
205 CoBRA Battalion	Barwadih, Bihar	
206 CoBRA Battalion	Chintapur, Maharashtra	
207 CoBRA Battalion	Salboni, West Bengal	
208 CoBRA Battalion	Balaghat, Madhya Pradesh	
209 CoBRA Battalion	Khunti, Jharkhand	
210 CoBRA Battalion	Dalgaon, Assam	
88 Mahila Battalion		

== Equipment ==
CoBRA is a well-equipped Central Armed Police unit in the country, set up with a budget of ₹293 billion from the Central government.

=== Small arms ===
Name	Country of origin	Type
Pistol Auto 9 mm 1A	India	Semi-automatic pistol
Glock	Austria	Semi-automatic pistol
Beretta Mx4 Storm	Italy	Submachine gun
Heckler & Koch MP5	Germany	Submachine gun
AKM	Soviet Union	Assault rifle
INSAS	India	Assault rifle
Excalibur	India	Assault rifle
FN FAL	Belgium	Assault rifle
IWI X95	Israel	Assault rifle
Heckler & Koch MSG-90	Germany	Sniper rifle
Steyr SSG 69	Austria	Sniper rifle
Dragunov SVD	Soviet Union	Sniper rifle
Carl Gustaf 8.4 cm recoilless rifle	Sweden	Rocket launcher
ARDE Under Barrel Grenade Launcher	India	Rocket launcher

Most of the equipment for the Cobra is manufactured indigenously by the Indian Ordnance Factories controlled by the Ordnance Factories Board, Ministry of Defence, Government of India.

Some weapon like long-range sniper rifles are imported from overseas

== Training ==
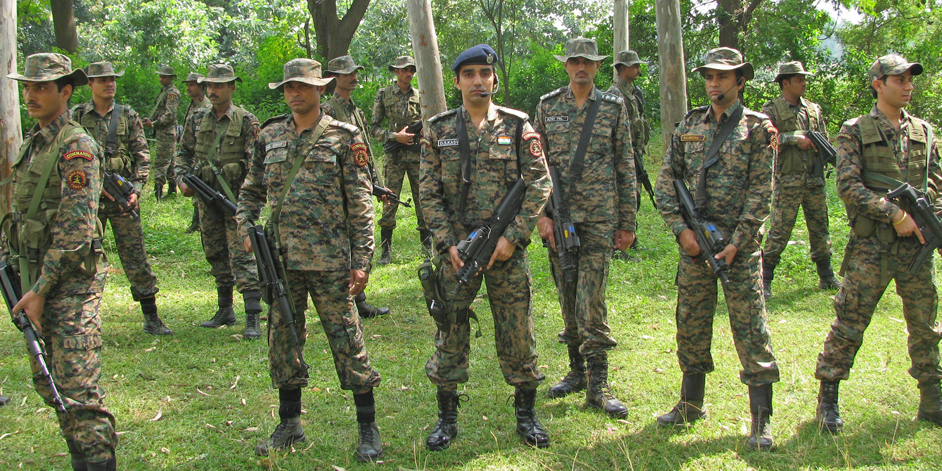
Unit's soldiers

CoBRA personnel are trained in the CRPF jungle warfare institutions in Belgaum and Koraput. Their training regime and duration are along the lines of other commando forces of the country such as the National Security Guard. They are trained in the art of camouflage with the main focus being on guerilla and jungle warfare. All personnel are trained for helicopter borne insertion and drops. Refresher courses are conducted annually and bi-annually to ensure that the unit and its personnel function as a well-oiled machine without any lapses. Their role is to carry out reconnaissance and long range patrols, gather intelligence on the whereabouts of the insurgents, and also carry out ambushes and precision strikes when required.

After three months of training in Belgaum or Koraput, CoBRA members are deployed to their respective units to counter-Naxal activities.

== Major operations ==
- On 05-6 March 2018 an operation "चक्रव्यूह" was conducted in Vill-Akbaitanr, U/PS-Dumari, Distt-Giridih (Jharkhand) by "Alpha coy" of 203 Cobra Battalion in which 03 hardcore and 35 lakhs rewardee Maoists and 12 Dasta Members were apprehended along with recovery of a huge cache of arms and ammunition. It was one of the historical operations in the history of Indian Paramilitary forces as the Cobra Commandos captured all those hardcore Maoists without firing a single bullet. Team Alfa of 203 cobra recovered 15 weapons with much ammunition, IEDs, Maoist literature, laptops and mobiles etc.
- On 17 September 2009 an operation was conducted in Singamdgu Dantewada district in which approximately 30–40 Maoists were reported to be killed.
- On 9 January 2010 under PS Jagargunda in district. Dantewada, 4 Maoists were killed and 112 Bore Gun with 4 cartridges, 3 muzzle-loading guns, 2 Tiffin Bomb, 1 improvised explosive device, Drum and Maoists literature with photographs were recovered.
- Ops Jaws carried out by 08 teams of 203 CoBRA from 11 TO 15 June in area of PS Sonua & Bandgaon District.- W/ Singhbhum, Jharkhand in which a Maoists camp was destroyed and reportedly 12 Maoists cadres were killed.
- During an operation launched in Duli forest area in W/Midnapur district (West Bengal) on 15–16 June 2010, 8 Maoists cadres were killed and a huge cache of arms and ammunitions was recovered.
- During an operation launched in Kayma forest area in W/Midnapur District. (WB) from 25 to 26 July 2010, 6 Maoists cadres were killed and a huge cache of arms and ammunitions were recovered.
- In operation launched in Saranda forest area in District. – W/Singhbhum, Jharkhand from 24 to 28 September 2010 Cobra teams were able to penetrate deep in forest and kill one Maoist, apprehend 4 Maoists cadres, bust 12 Maoist camps and recover of arms, ammunitions and explosives.
