= Gondi language =

Dravidian language spoken in India

Gondi
- गोण्डि, గోణ్డి, ଗୋଣ୍ଡି, 𑵶𑶓𑶕𑶂𑶋, 𑴎𑴽𑵀𑴘𑴳,
- Gōṇḍī (Kōītōr) written in Gunjala Gondi, Masaram Gondi, Telugu and Devanagari scripts
- Native to: India
- Region: Gondwana
- Ethnicity: Gondi
- Native speakers: 2.98 million (2011 census)
- Language family: Dravidian: Southern; South-Central; Gondi languages; Gondi
- Writing system: Telugu script, Devanagari, Odia script, Gunjala script, Masaram script (See Gondi scripts)

Language codes
- ISO 639-2: gon
- ISO 639-3: gon – inclusive code Individual codes: gno – Northern Gondi esg – Aheri Gondi wsg – Adilabad Gondi
- Glottolog: nort3258
- Areas where Gondi is spoken. Koya not included.

- Gondi is classified as Vulnerable by the UNESCO Atlas of the World's Languages in Danger.

- Person: Gōṇḍ
- People: Gōṇḍir
- Language: Gōṇḍī, Kōī, Kōītōr
- Country: Gōṇḍvana

A man speaking the Aheri dialect of Gondi.

Gondi (Gōṇḍī, IPA: [ɡoːɳɖiː]), natively known as Koitur (Kōī, Kōītōr, IPA: [koː.iː, koː.iː.t̪oːr]), is a South-Central Dravidian language, spoken by about three million Gondi people, chiefly in the Indian states of Madhya Pradesh, Maharashtra, Chhattisgarh, Andhra Pradesh, Telangana and by small minorities in neighbouring states. Although it is the language of the Gond people, it is highly endangered, with only one fifth of Gonds speaking the language. Gondi has a rich folk literature, examples of which are wedding songs and narrations. Gondi people are ethnically related to the Telugus. Gondi is the largest minor Dravidian language by number of speakers.

== Endangerment ==
Although almost 13 million people returned themselves as Gonds on the 2011 census, only 2.98 million recorded themselves as speakers of Gondi. In the present-day, large communities of Gondi speakers can be found in southeastern Madhya Pradesh (Betul, Chhindwara, Seoni, Balaghat, Mandla, Dindori, and Jabalpur districts), eastern Maharashtra (Amravati, Nagpur, Yavatmal, Chandrapur, Gadchiroli and Gondia districts), northern Telangana (Adilabad, Komaram Bheem, and Bhadradi Kothagudem districts), the Bastar division of Chhattisgarh and Nabarangpur district of Odisha.

This is the result of a language shift from Gondi to regional languages in the majority of the Gondi population, especially those in the northern portion of their range. By the 1920s, half of Gonds had stopped speaking the language entirely. The language is under severe stress from dominant languages such as Hindi, Chhattisgarhi, Marathi and Odia due to their use in education and employment. In order to improve their situation, Gond households adopt the more prestigious dominant language and their children become monolingual in that language. Already in the 1970s, Gondi youth in places with increased contact with wider society had stopped speaking the language, seeing it as a relic of old times. The constant contact between speakers of Gondi and Indo-Aryan languages has resulted in massive Indo-Aryan borrowing in Gondi, found in vocabulary, grammar and syntax. In one survey in Anuppur district for instance, it was found the dialect of Gondi spoken there, known as dehati bhasha ('rural language'), was actually a mixture of Hindi and Chhattisgarhi rather than Gondi. However, the survey also found younger Gonds had a positive attitude towards speaking Gondi and saving the language from extinction. Another survey from areas throughout the Gond region found younger Gonds felt developing their mother tongue was less important, but there were still large numbers willing to help in its development. Some attempts at revitalization have included children's books and online videos.

== Etymology ==
The origin of the name Gond, used by outsiders, is still uncertain. Some believe the word to derive from the Dravidian kond, meaning hill, similar to the Khonds of Odisha.

Another theory, according to Vol. 3 of the Worldmark Encyclopedia of Cultures and Daily Life, is that the name was given to them by the Mughal dynasty of the 16th–18th centuries. It was the Mughals who first used the term "Gond", meaning "hill people", to refer to the group.

The Gonds call themselves Koitur (Kōītōr) or Koi (Kōī), which also has no definitive origin.

== Internal classification ==
Glottolog classifies the Gondoid languages as follows:

- Gondoid
  - Northwest Gondi
    - Northern Gondi
    - Southwest Gondi
      - Muria 15,864 (2011 census)
        - Eastern Muria
        - Western Muria
      - Southern Gondi
        - Adilabad Gondi
        - Eastern Gondi
          - Aheri Gondi
          - Far Western Muria
  - Southeast Gondi
    - Madiya (365,000 cited 2000)
    - South Bastar Gondi‑Koya
      - Dandami Madiya
      - Koya 455,000 (2011)
  - Khirwar? 26,000 (2011 census)
  - Nagarchal? († extinct)
  - Pardhan? 140,000 (2007)

== Characteristics ==
Gondi has a two-gender system, substantives being either masculine or nonmasculine. Gondi has developed aspirated stops, distancing itself from its ancestor Proto-Dravidian.

== Phonology ==
=== Consonants ===
		Labial	Dental/ Alveolar	Retroflex	Post-alv./ Palatal	Velar	Glottal
Nasal		m	n	(ɳ)	(ɲ)	ŋ	
Stop/ Affricate	voiceless	p	t	ʈ	tʃ	k	
Stop/ Affricate	aspirated	pʰ	tʰ	ʈʰ	tʃʰ	kʰ	
Stop/ Affricate	voiced	b	d	ɖ	dʒ	ɡ	
Stop/ Affricate	breathy	bʱ	dʱ	ɖʱ	dʒʱ	ɡʱ	
Fricative		v	s	(ʂ)			h
Approx.	median	(w)			j		
Approx.	lateral		l				
Tap			ɾ	ɽ			

- Sounds /tʃ tʃʰ dʒ dʒʱ/ can be heard as alveo-palatal [tɕ tɕʰ dʑ dʑʱ] before non-front vowels in some dialects.
- /s/ is realized as a retroflex sibilant [ʂ] before a retroflex stop /ʈ/.
- An alveolar tap sound /ɾ/ can vary freely with a trill sound [r].
- /n/ is realized as a dental nasal [n̪] before a dental stop sound, a palatal nasal [ɲ] before a palatal affricate, and a retroflex nasal [ɳ] before a retroflex stop. Elsewhere, it is articulated as an alveolar nasal [n].
- /v/ is realized as an approximant [w] when occurring before rounded vowels.
- All consonants except /ɽ, ɾ, s, h/ can occur either double or single in the medial position.
- In south and southeastern Gondi dialects, the initial s is turning into h and getting deleted for some.
- Hill-Maṛia dialect of Gondi has a uvular /ʁ/ which corresponds to the r̠ in other Dravidian languages or *t̠ from proto Dravidian and it contrasts with the alveolar r corresponding to proto-Dravidian *r.

=== Vowels ===
	Front		Central		Back	
	short	long	short	long	short	long
High	i	iː			u	uː
Mid	e	eː			o	oː
Low			a	aː		

== Morphology ==
=== Nouns ===
Gondi has derivative suffixes to denote gender for certain special words: -a:l and -o:r for masculine, and -a:r for feminine. Plural suffixes are also divided into masculine and feminine, -r is used for most masculine nouns, -ir ends masculine nouns ending in -e, and -ur ends nouns ending in -o or -or. For instance:

kānḍī - boy kānḍīr - boys

kallē - thief kallīr - thieves

tottōr - ancestor tottūr - ancestors

are all masculine.

For non-masculine nouns, there are more suffixes: -n, -ik, -k, and a null suffix -ɸ

Before case markers are added, all nouns have an oblique marker. The oblique markers are -d-, -t-, -n-, -ṭ-, and -ɸ.

For instance:

kay-d-e: "in the hand"

Gondi has several case markers.

Genitive case markers are -na, -va, -a.

- -na is used after na:r, meaning village. -va is used after personal and reflexive pronouns.
- -a is used elsewhere.

== Sample text ==
The given sample text is Article 1 from the United Nations Universal Declaration of Human Rights.

=== English ===
All human beings are born free and equal in dignity and rights. They are endowed with reason and conscience and should act towards one another in a spirit of brotherhood.

=== Northern Gondi ===
सब् माने कुन् गौरव् अरु अधिकार् ना मांला ते जनंजात् सुतन्तर्ता अरु बराबर् ता हक् पुट्ताल। अवेन् भायि लेह्का माने मासि बेव्हार् कियाना आन्द।

=== Romanisation (ISO 15919) ===
Sab māne kun gaurav aru adhikār nā māmlā tē janamjāt sutantartā aru barābar tā hak puṭtāla. Aven bhāyi lehkā māne māsi bevhār kiyānā ānda.

== Dialects ==
Most of the Gondi dialects are still inadequately recorded and described. The more important dialects are Dorla, Koya, Madiya, Muria, and Raj Gond. Some basic phonologic features separate the northwestern dialects from the southeastern. One is the treatment of the original initial s, which is preserved in northern and western Gondi, while farther to the south and east it has been changed to h; in some other dialects it has been lost completely. Other dialectal variations in the Gondi language are the alteration of initial r with initial l and a change of e and o to a.

In 2015, the ISO 639 code for the "Southern Gondi language", "ggo", was deprecated and split into two codes, Aheri Gondi (esg) and Adilabad Gondi (wsg).

== Writing ==
Gondi writing can be split into two categories: that using its own writing systems and that using writing systems also used for other languages.

For lack of a widespread native script, Gondi is often written in Devanagari and Telugu scripts.

In 1928, Munshi Mangal Singh Masaram designed a native script based on Brahmi characters and in the same format of an Indian alphasyllabary. This script did not become widely used, although it is being encoded in Unicode. Most Gonds remain illiterate.

A native script that dates up to 1750 has been discovered by a group of researchers from the University of Hyderabad. It's usually named Gunjala Gondi Lipi, after the place where it was found. According to Maharashtra Oriental Manuscripts Library and Research Centre of India, a dozen manuscripts were found in this script. Programs to create awareness and promotion of this script among the Gondi people are in development stage. The Gunjala Gondi Lipi has witnessed a surge in prominence, and well-supported efforts are being undertaken in villages of northern Andhra Pradesh to widen its usage.

=== Alphabet charts of various Scripts used to write Gondi ===
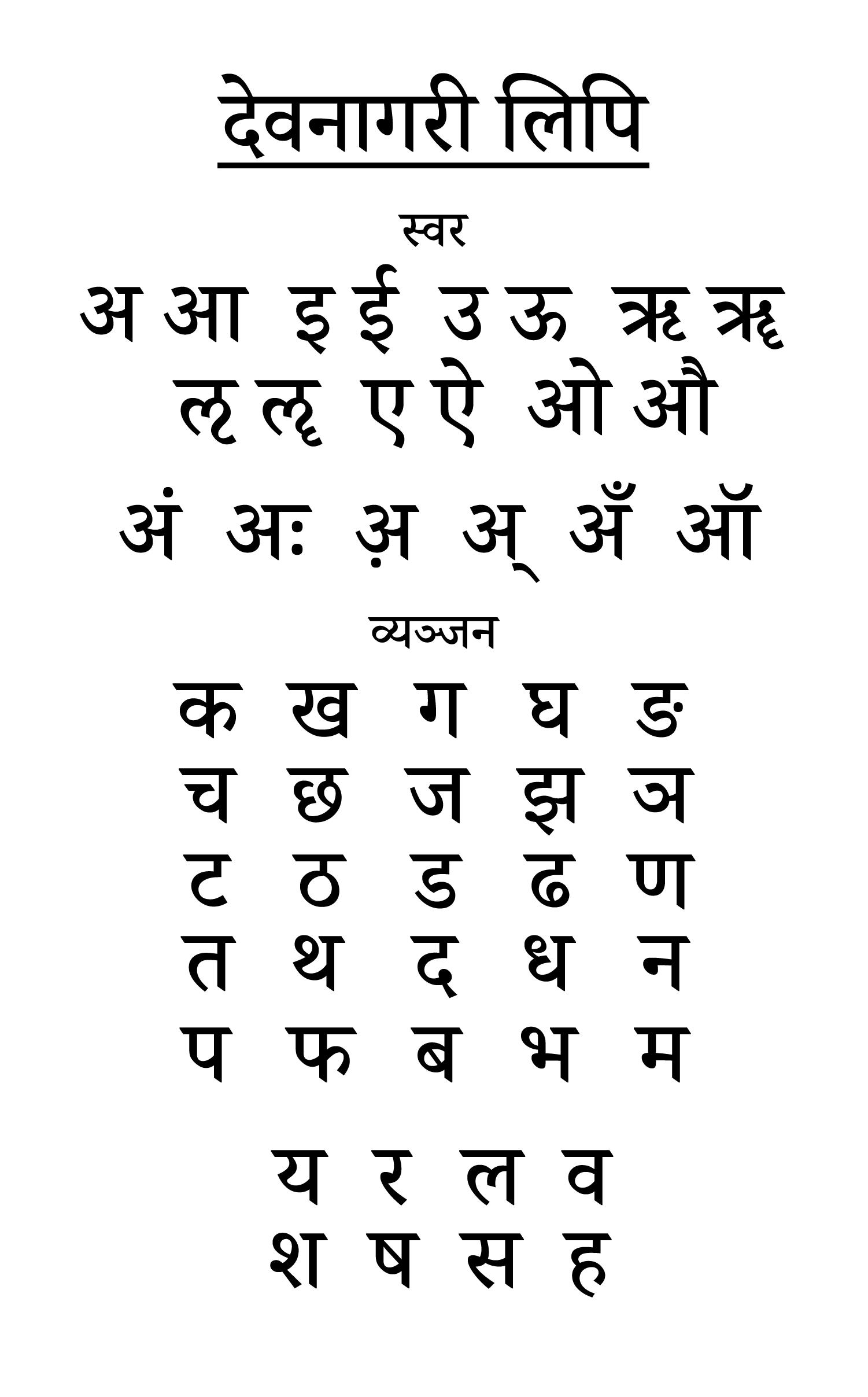
Standard Devanāgarī Varnamala

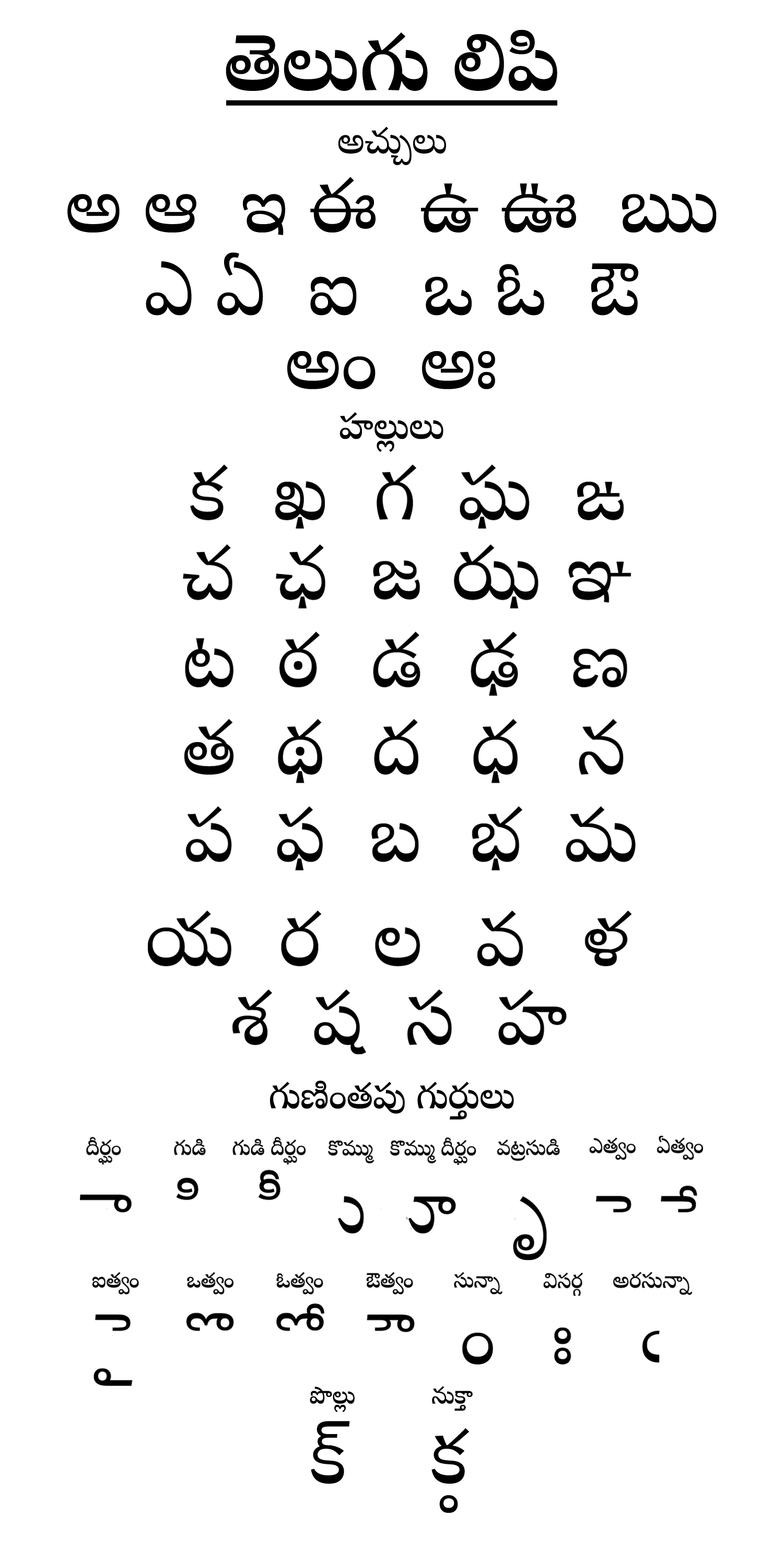
Telugu Aksharamala

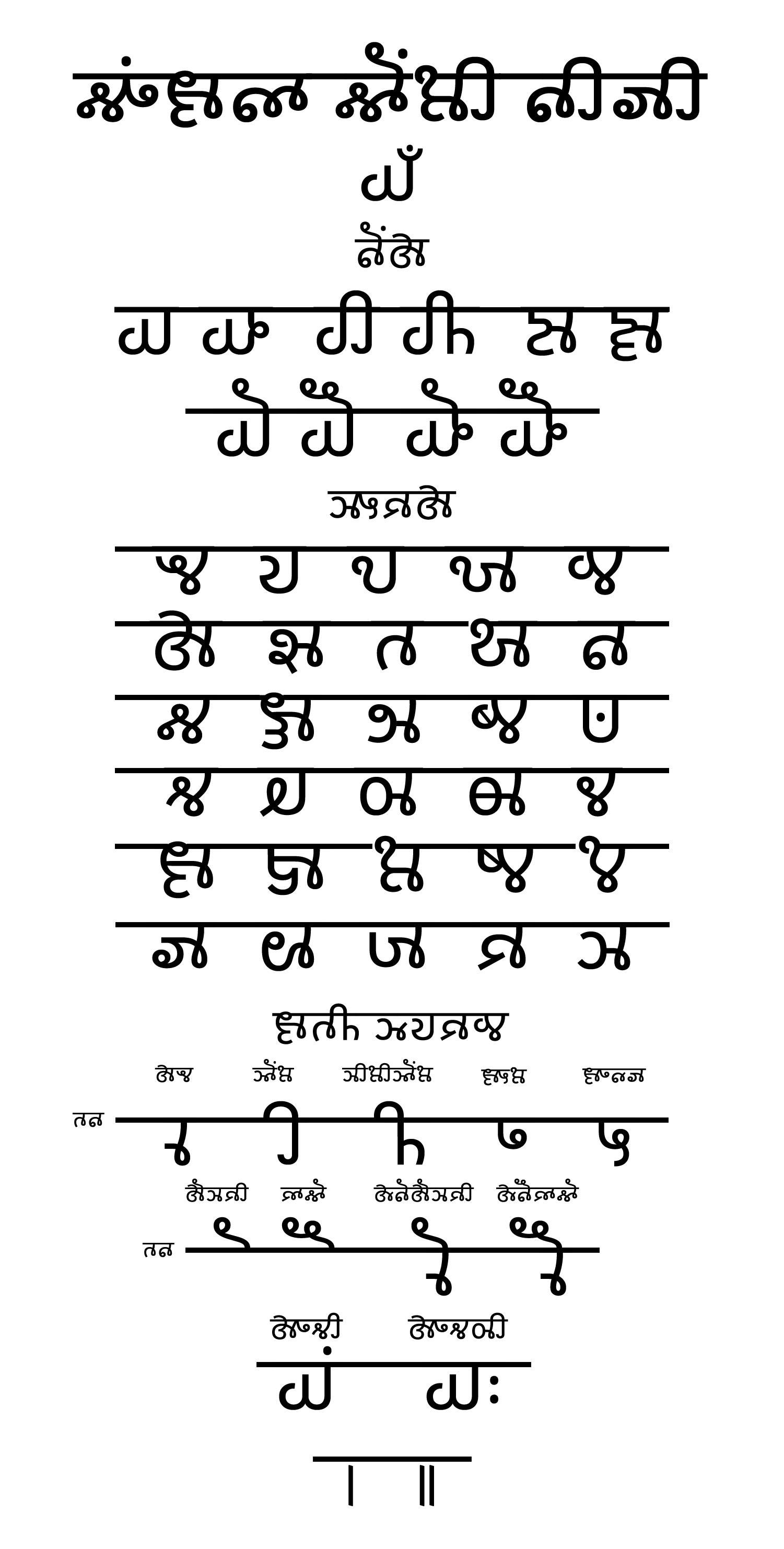
Gunjala Gondi Aksharamala

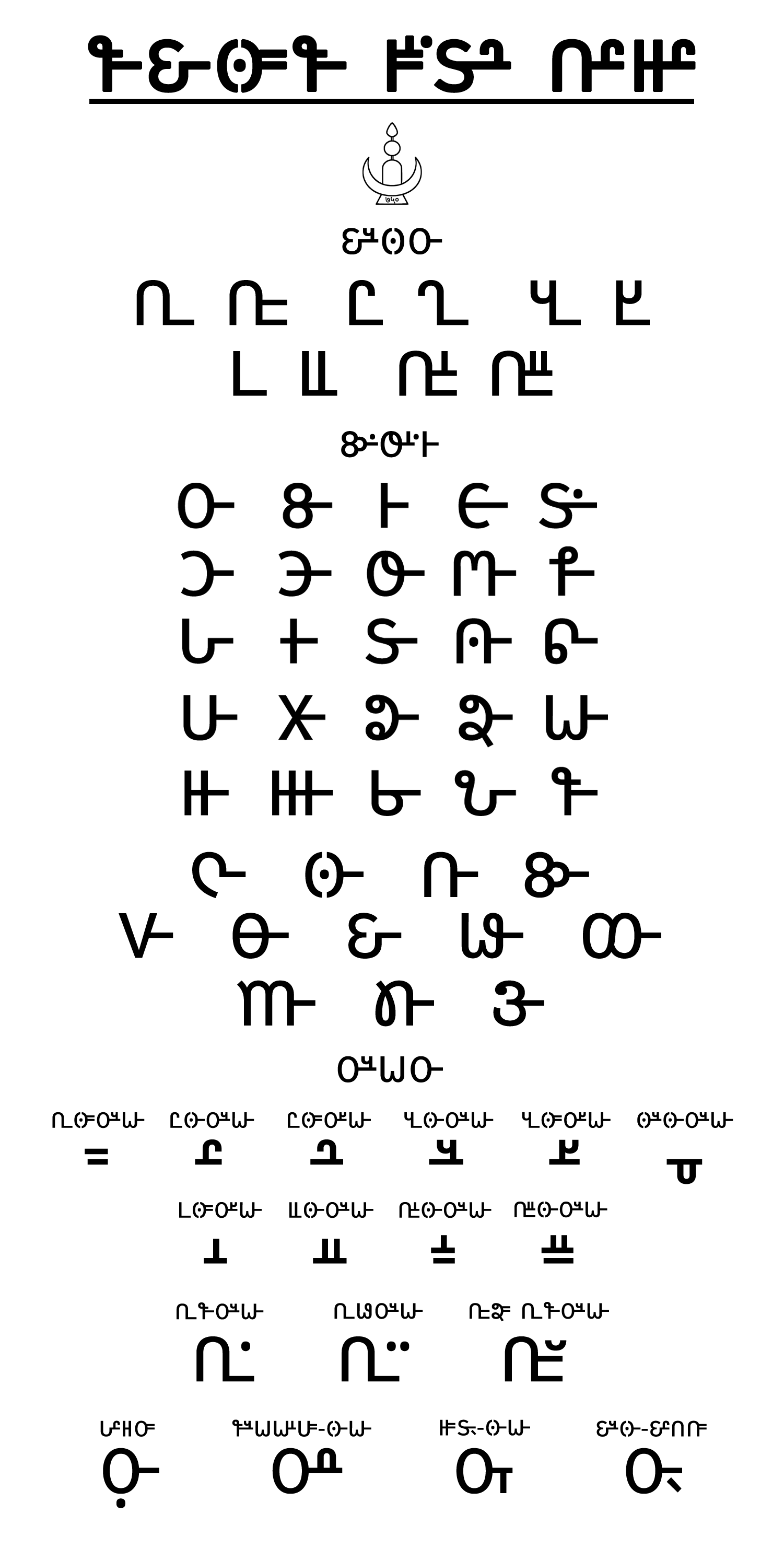
Masaram Gondi Aksharamala

== See also ==
- Thoti (speakers of a Gondi dialect)
