= Madiya language =

Dravidian language spoken in India

Maria
- Madiya
- Native to: India
- Native speakers: (365,000 cited 2000)
- Language family: Dravidian: South-Central; Gondi–Kui; Gondi languages; Maria
- Writing system: Devanagari

Language codes
- ISO 639-3: Either: mrr – Garhchiroli Maria daq – Dandami Maria
- Glottolog: mari1414 Maria dand1238 Dandami Maria

Madiya or Maria (IPA: [mɐɽijɐ]) is a Dravidian language spoken in India. It may be regarded as a dialect of Gondi, but is suspected to be mutually unintelligible with most other Gondi varieties.

== Phonology ==
Phonology of Abhuj Maria:

Consonants
		Bilabial	Alveolar	Retroflex	Palatal	Velar
Plosive	voiceless	p	t	ʈ		k
Plosive	voiced	b	d	ɖ		g
Affricate	voiceless				t͡ʃ	
Affricate	voiced				d͡ʒ	
Fricative			s			
Nasal		m	n		ɲ	
Approximant		w	l	ɽ	j	
Trill			r			

Hill Maria has 3 additional consonants: a glottal stop /ʔ/, a retroflex nasal /ɳ/, and a uvular fricative /ʁ/.

In 2019, a former professor published the first book in the Madiya language.
