= Sukma district =

Coordinates: 18.4000°N 81.6667°E

- District of Chhattisgarh
- Location in Chhattisgarh
- Sukma district
- Country: India
- State: Chhattisgarh
- Division: Bastar

Area
  - Total: 5,897 km^{2} (2,277 sq mi)

Population (2011)
  - Total: 250,159
  - Density: 42.42/km^{2} (109.9/sq mi)
- Time zone: UTC+05:30 (IST)
- Website: sukma.gov.in

Sukma district is the southernmost district in the Indian state of Chhattisgarh. It is located in the Bastar region, known for its tribal culture. Sukma district borders Odisha (Malkangiri district), Telangana (Bhadradri Kothagudem district) and Andhra Pradesh (Alluri Sitharama Raju district).

Located at the southern tip of Chhattisgarh, the district was carved out of Dantewada in 2012. It is covered with semitropical forest and is mainly inhabited by Gonds and other tribals. The district has nearly 85% of its population as STs, 65% of its area is covered with the forest and an extremely low population density of merely 45 persons per km^{2}. It also has one of the lowest literacy rates in India, 29%. One major river that flows through the district is Sabari and the district receives decent rainfall in the monsoon season.

The district is one of the least developed districts of India. The district is severely affected by Naxalism or Maoism.

== Demographics ==
Religions in Sukma district (2011)
Religion	Percent
Hinduism	95.61%
Other (Tribal religion)	2.31%
Islam	1.23%
Christianity	0.60%
Other or not stated	0.25%

The district has a population of 250,159, of which 28,202 (11.27%) live in urban areas. Sukma has a sex ratio of 1017 females per 1000 males and a literacy rate of 34.81%. Scheduled Castes and Scheduled Tribes make up 1.11% and 83.47% of the district's population respectively.

Languages of Sukma district (2011)
1. Gondi (55.2%)
2. Halbi (11.6%)
3. Dorli (9.33%)
4. Duruwa (7.82%)
5. Hindi (5.52%)
6. Madiya (4.00%)
7. Telugu (1.86%)
8. Chhattisgarhi (1.26%)
9. Bengali (1.03%)
10. Others (2.36%)

As per the 2011 census, 55.24% of the population spoke Gondi, 11.58% Halbi, 9.30% Dorli, 7.82% Dhurwa, 5.51% Hindi, 4.00% Muria, 1.86% Telugu and 1.03% Bengali as their first language.

== History ==
Sukma District is the southern part of Bastar and it is newly formed on 16 January 2012. It is a Sub-Tehsil in 1952 under Bastar region, later upgraded to Tehsil in 1956, After Konta Tehsil is formed in 1960 SDO office Konta at headquarter Sukma started in 1976. When Dantewada is divided from Bastar in 1998 Sukma came under Dantewada District. Sukma got its existence as a new district in the year 2012. This is the LWE affected district which is far from Development. Sukma 400 km away from state capital Raipur, well connected by NH-30. It is sharing the border with Odisha, Telangana and Andhra Pradesh states and districts Bastar, Bijapur and Dantewada.

This land known as Dandakaranya from the ancient times is a habitat for different types of Tribal communities. Tribes residing here had no exposure to the outer world, they used to feed themselves on the abundance of forest produces and by hunting the animal in the forest, they used to live a happy and most contained life.

Sukma has come into existence approximately in the year 1300. The predecessors of the Jameendars of Sukma who worked in this area under the kingship of the erstwhile Maharaja of Bastar were originated from Rajasthan and fled to Warangal. They have re-established themselves here and started leading their life however the curse of bad time did not stop worrying them even here, they were very often subjected to the highhandedness of the Maratha Rajas and Peshwas who used to impose different Taxes and Punishments. To avoid these atrocities the predecessors of the Jameendars have reached around Sukma through Bheji passing different forest areas and have started searching for a shelter to themselves. Among this group one family consisting of a father, mother and their boy had tried to cross the river Shabri to reach the other bank of the river but when they were in the middle of the river their boat had struck in the whirlpool of the river and an angel had appeared in front of them and had asked them to sacrifice one among them so as to ensure the safety of the remaining two. The father had readily accepted to offer himself in sacrifice but his boy contested and said that as you both are healthy you can still have children and hence let me sacrifice myself saying that the boy had jumped into the river. The place where the boy had jumped into the river is still known as Muniputta, which appears like an island in the middle of river at village Telavarti. At this place wooden chappal and the trident are visible. Devotees reach this place in scores of numbers during Shivratri and Makar Sankranti and perform Puja. It is believed that this island had never so far submerged in the river in any of the floods and it is also believed that if this island gets submerged in the river then there would be a big havoc. These couple settled at Mahadev Dongri for a brief period but due to threat from the wild animal they came and settled nearby Shabari river later. Mahadev Dongri is located at 3 km distance from Sukma and one ancient Shiva temple is located in this village which is believed to be installed by these couple. Lot of festivity can still be seen at this place during the Shivratri.

Later on, these couple have settled down at the present day's Rajwada area of Sukma, they felt very comfortable in this place. Even though they were living in the absence of necessary facilities such as education and comforts amidst the tribes they started feeling this area very comfortable far from the atrocities of Mughals and the Marathas thus they named this place as Sukma. It is also believed that the deity of the famous temple of Chitpitin Mata located at village Ramaram is also brought by these couple along with them and that the temple had been constructed by these couple. Even today when the Pujari chants during sacrifice at this temple certain words are revered which indicate that the deity is brought from Warangal. In due course of time Sukma had seen many changes and transformation into one among the new Districts is one among them.

== Culture and heritage ==
Injeram is a village located around 70 km from Sukma towards Konta which comes 10 km before Konta on the National Highway. According to popular belief, Rishi Inji's ashram was located in this village during the Ramayana period. The name is believed to derive from the Gondi phrase "Inje Ram vathod" ("Ram came here"). Just 100 Meters to the right side from the main road we can still see ruins of many ancient sculptures of different deities.

== Education ==
District is very much underdeveloped in the area of Education. Main reason of this underdevelopment can be attributed to the disparity and lack of standard education in the schools. There is a greater amount of scarcity of specialized teachers at higher schooling levels such as Mathematics, Physics, Chemistry and English. Even though recruitment's are done, teachers tends to go other places as soon as they get offers outside.

With this in mind, opening Ashram Shalas (residential schools) in connected villages where children of nearby 4 to 5 remote and unconnected villages can be educated could benefit the education level. POTA Cabin Ashrams are mainly conducted for the dropout students. Thus the arrangement of Ashrams for the regular students could be of use.

A total of 143 ashrams, hostels and special residential schools are run by the Tribal Development Department in Sukma district. Whose numerical details are as follows - ST Ashram : 95 ST Hostel : 44 ST.Girls Education Complex: 01 Eklavya Model Residential School : 03

== Health ==
Health has been a focal sector for the district administration in the past few years . Some proactive measures adopted by the Government have helped in filling the vacant para medical staff, doctors and specialist doctors posts considerably. Further to this improvising the health institutions through providing modern equipment, labs and other essential facilities is paying good dividends. Government hospitals are the only source of medical care in the district, hence fine tuning the health services is essential, which is being done relentlessly.

== Places of interest ==
Sukma District is part of Bastar, many outsiders visit to study the Bastar Culture and the tribal life of Adivasis. It is a place of rich Traditional Culture.

1. Dudma tourist spot: Dudma Tourist Places is one of the most visited places near Sukma. It attracts tourism with its natural beauty and sights. Located around 28 km from District Headquarter Sukma

2. Tungal Dam: The citizens of the district have been dependent on entertainment or tourism in other districts or neighbouring places of tourist places. Government decided to develop this bandh as eco-tourism center. It is located around 3 km from District Headquarter Sukma, In this eco-tourism centre construction of basic infrastructures like motorboat, paddle boat arrangement, access road and hut site was constructed by the district administration and forest department. On 2 October 2015, the inauguration of Tugan Dam Eco Tourism Center was inaugurated by the Forest Minister of the state. Various activities in this eco-tourism centre were motivated to motivate the youth of the nearby village Tugal for the operation of motor operators, naka operations, maintenance of emu birds etc. In which 21 young people agreed, the Forest Department registered the group under self-help group Mutantonda Forest Range Sukma.

3. Dornapal bridge: Located around 37 km from District HQ Sukma. It is a crucial connectivity bridge between LWE affected area of Sukma in Chhattisgarh and Odisha State. Before this bridge construction, people have to travel 140 km to go to Odisha, Now it takes only 3 km.

== Transport ==
By Road: Buses are running daily between Sukma and state capital Raipur. Sukma has road connectivity to Raipur, Jagdalpur, Dantewada, Malkangiri, Hyderabad and Vijayawada. Interstate bus services are available daily to Hyderabad, Vijayawada and Rajahmundry. National Highway NH-30 passing through Sukma district, ensures smooth travel on road to Raipur and Hyderabad.

By Rail: Dantewada and Jagdalpur railway stations are nearest railway stations to Sukma. Bus services are available to reach Sukma from Dantewada and Jagdalpur.

By Air: Jagdalpur airport is the nearest airport, It is 100 km away from Sukma. Jagdalpur airport started its operation to Bhubaneswar and Visakhapatnam. Rajahmundry Airport is the second nearest airport, located at a distance of 200 km from Sukma. Interstate bus services available to reach Sukma from Rajahmundry.
