= Koya language =

South-Central Dravidian language of India

Koya
- కోయా, କୋୟା, कोया
- Native to: India
- Ethnicity: Koya
- Native speakers: 455,000 (2011)
- Language family: Dravidian: South-Central; Gondi–Kui; Gondi languages; Koya
- Writing system: Telugu, Odia, Devanagari

Language codes
- ISO 639-3: kff
- Glottolog: koya1251

Koya (IPA: [koja]) is a South-Central Dravidian language of the Gondi–Kui group spoken in central and southern India. It is the native language of the Koya people. It is sometimes described as a dialect of Gondi, but it is mutually unintelligible with Gondi dialects.

Koya is the language spoken by the tribal community in Integrated Tribal Development Agency (ITDA),Rampachodavaram, East Godavari district; ITDA,Kotaramachandrapuram, West Godavari district; ITDA,Bhadrachalam in Khammam district, after telanaga state formation now it is in the part of Bhadradri Kothagudem District. Telanagana . in the year of 2025 Integrated Tribal Development Agency (ITDA) developed a Museum to show the culture of the Koya community and other Sheudule tribes. The Koyas also live in the southernmost part of Sukma in Chhattisgarh and Malkangiri, the southwesternmost district of Odisha.

Koya is variously written in the Odia, Telugu, Devanagari or Latin script. Sathupati Prasanna Sree has also developed a unique script for use with the Koya language. With 270,994 registered native speakers, it figures at rank 37 in the 1991 Indian census. There are textbooks developed in Koya language under Mother Tongue based Multilingual Education Programme by Government of Andhra Pradesh and implemented in 50 primary schools in Koya habitations.
