= Katakam Sudarshan =

Politburo and Central Military Commission member of Communist Party of India (died 2023)

- Born: 1954; Adilabad, Andhra Pradesh
- Died: 31 May 2023
- Other name: Anand
- Organization: Communist Party of India (Maoist)
- Known for: A cadre, Politburo and Central Military Commission member of CPI (Maoist)
- Spouse: Sadhana

Katakam Sudarshan (1954–31 May 2023), commonly known by his nom de guerre Anand (Hindi pronunciation: [aːnənd̪]), was an Indian politician who was a Politburo member of the Communist Party of India (Maoist), a banned Maoist insurgent communist party in India.

== Early life and family ==
Anand was born at Adilabad in Andhra Pradesh, and pursued education at the government polytechnic college, in Warangal. He worked as a teacher to financially support his higher education. He married the Adiladab district secretary of CPI (Maoist), Sadhana. She was gunned down by the police force, few years back.

== Guerrilla life ==
Anand was one of the senior-most cadres of the ultra-leftist political party, and led the ongoing armed struggle from northern Telangana to Dandakaranya, for over 30 years. He was described by Indian police as a "soft spoken" person, an "orthodox" Maoist and a "hardline strategist". He was prominently known for chalking out the policies of the party in the political arena, and upheld that political power grows out of the barrel of a gun.

After the completion of his studies, Anand joined the radical leftists in 1975; and in 1979, he shifted to Chhattisgarh. In the 1980s, he became a member of the Communist Party of India (Marxist-Leninist) People's War (People's War Group), founded by Kondapalli Seetharamaiah. He was famous for his "ruthless guerilla warfare tactics" and was designated the duty of training the cadres in "guerrilla warfare", and planning "military precision strikes" on the armed forces, in the territory of Chhattisgarh.

Anand was a Central Military Commission and Politburo member of CPI (Maoist), and was believed to be heading the Eastern Regional Bureau of the party, after Kishenji's elimination in the ongoing Maoist movement in India. He also worked as the chief of the Central Regional Bureau of the CPI (Maoist).

Responding on a question about the Indian government's "Operation Green Hunt" during an interview, he said to journalists, "We have been in the middle of a cruel, bitter war for several years." In 2010, he told media personnel that out of the 45 members of the Central Committee of the Communist Party of India (Maoist), 8 had been arrested and 22 had been killed by the agencies of the Indian government. He was also reportedly working on the task to attempt stalling the "Operation Green Hunt".

A senior police officer once told Hindustan Times that "Sudarshan was not a pacifist like Azad and was against his party's initiative to hold talks with the government."

== Death ==
Anand died of a heart attack on 31 May 2023.

== See also ==
- Socialism
- Communism
- Marxism
- Leninism
- Marxism-Leninism-Maoism
- Naxalism
- People's war
- New Democratic Revolution
- Radicalism (historical)
- Left-wing politics
- Naxalite-Maoist insurgency
- Anuradha Ghandy
- Azad
- Charu Majumdar
- Ganapathy
- Kobad Ghandy
- Kosa
- Narmada Akka
- Prashant Bose
