= Kosa (Maoist) =

Indian Maoist politician (died 2025)

Kadarat Satyanarayan Reddy
- Born: Adilabad, Telangana, India
- Died: 22 September 2025; Narayanpur district, Chhattisgarh, India
- Other names: Kosa, Gopanna, Sadhu
- Organization: Communist Party of India (Maoist)
- Known for: A cadre and Central Committee member of CPI (Maoist)
- Criminal charges: Left-wing insurgency, Murder, Criminal conspiracy
- Criminal status: Killed in encounter
- Spouse: Radha

Kadart Satyanarayan Reddy (died 22 September 2025), commonly known by his nom de guerre, Kosa (Hindi pronunciation: [koːsaː]), was an Indian militant commander, who was a Central Committee member of the Communist Party of India (Maoist), a banned Maoist militant organisation in India.

== Background ==
In 1984, Kosa was married to Radha; soon after their marriage, Kosa decided to have a vasectomy, as the couple consciously concluded that "it was very difficult to have children and fight a guerrilla warfare." Kosa told media that "Maoist cadres did not force their women to undergo sterilisation operation but they themselves opt for tubectomy."

== Guerrilla life ==
In an interview with the media, one of the officials of Central Reserve Police Force (CRPF) has described Kosa as "very good with arms and ammunition and a master at guerrilla warfare.

He hailed from Gopalraopally village, now in Rajanna Sircilla district. Kosa was a former secretary of Dandakaranya Special Zone Committee and a former "military commander" of CPI (Maoist), and was appointed by the Central Regional Bureau of the political party to "fill the void" left after Kishenji's killing in the ongoing Maoist movement in the region. After Kosa was promoted to the Central Committee of the party, Ramanna replaced him as the head of its Dandakaranya Special Zone Committee.

In 2009, NDTV stated that Kosa was "one of the top five Maoist leaders in India.

== Death ==
Kosa and another Maoist leader, Katta Ramchandra Reddy (alias Vikalp, Raju, Vasu), were killed in an encounter on 22 September 2025 with the security force in Narayanpur district.

== See also ==
- Marxism
- Leninism
- Marxism-Leninism-Maoism
- Naxalism
- People's war
- New Democratic Revolution
- Naxalite-Maoist insurgency
- Anand
- Anuradha Ghandy
- Azad
- Charu Majumdar
- Ganapathy
- Kobad Ghandy
- Kondapalli Seetharamaiah
- Narmada Akka
- Prashant Bose
