= Pamarru mandal =

Pamarru Mandal
- Mandal
- Interactive Map Outlining mandal
- Location in Andhra Pradesh, India
- Coordinates: 16.43°N 80.99°E
- Country: India
- State: Andhra Pradesh
- District: Krishna
- Headquarters: Pamarru

Area
  - Total: 120.31 km^{2} (46.45 sq mi)

Population (2011)
  - Total: 54,634
  - Density: 454.11/km^{2} (1,176.1/sq mi)

Languages
  - Official: Telugu
- Time zone: UTC+5:30 (IST)
- PIN: 521 XXX
- Vehicle registration: AP 16

Pamarru Mandal is one of the 25 Mandals in the Krishna district of the Indian state of Andhra Pradesh. It is under the administration of Gudivada revenue division and the headquarters are located at Pamarru. The mandal is bounded by Pamidimukkala, Pedaparupudi, Movva, Gudur, Gudlavalleru and Gudivada Mandals of Krishna District.

== Administration ==
The Pamarru mandal is partially a part of the Andhra Pradesh Capital Region under the jurisdiction of APCRDA.

== Towns and villages ==
As of 2011 census, the mandal has 25 settlements and all are 29 villages. The settlements in the mandal are listed below:

1. Velpuru
2. Mullapudi
3. Addada
4. Ainampudi
5. Balliparru
6. Jujjavaram
7. Kanumuru
8. Kapavaram
9. Komaravolu
10. Kondiparru
11. Kurumaddali
12. Mallavaram
13. Mir Imam Palem
14. Nemmikuru
15. Nibhanupudi
16. Nimmaluru
17. Pamarru
18. Pasumarru
19. Pedamaddali
20. Polavaram
21. Prakarla
22. Raparala
23. Rimmanapudi
24. Undrapudi
25. Uruturu
26. Yelakurru
27. Zamidaggumilli
28. Zamigolvepalle

Note: †–Mandal Headquarters, M-Municipality

== See also ==
- List of villages in Krishna district
