= Narmada Akka =

Member of the Communist Party of India (died 2012)

Narmada
- Born: Andhra Pradesh
- Died: 4 December 2012; Aheri, Gadchiroli
- Organization: Communist Party of India (Maoist)
- Known for: A cadre and Central Committee member of the CPI (Maoist)
- Criminal charge: left wing Insurgency
- Criminal status: killed in encounter
- Spouse: Sudhakar

Narmada (died 4 December 2012), commonly known as Narmada Akka, was an Indian politician who was one of the "senior-most" female cadres of the Communist Party of India (Maoist), a banned Maoist insurgent communist party in India. She was a Central Committee member of the party, and reportedly used to frame "all policies for the female cadre of Maoists."

== Family ==
She married Sudhakar alias "Kiran". B. Sudhakar is seen as a Maoist ideologue, and is a member of CPI (Maoist)'s "publication division". He is also a member of the Politburo of the party.

== Guerrilla life ==
Narmada was able to fluently communicate in seven languages, including English. She dropped-out the college and joined the CPI (Maoist) at an early age of 18, and she had spent over 30 years in the jungles as a veteran to the Maoist movement in India. Her father was also a supporter of the communist ideology, and his words so touched her that she made her mind to join the radical leftists.

During an interview with Rahul Pandita and Vanessa (a French journalist), at an unknown time in the jungles of Dandakaranya, Narmada said:

"My father was a Communist, and in those times, a Communist was like a pariah. My father would talk about Naxals and say that they have broken away from the shackles of domesticity."

And, it was after that conversation with her father, that she decided to join the Maoists. She was active as the Divisional Secretary of South Gadchiroli division of CPI (Maoist). She was the second female comrade to have been selected as a member of the Central Committee of the radical leftist organisation, after Anuradha Ghandy (wife of Kobad Ghandy). She was also acting as the chief of the Krantikari Adivasi Mahila Sangathan's unit of Dandakaranya region, which is among the top-most "women's organizations" in India when it comes to numbers of registered members, and Arundhati Roy says that it has 90,000 members. She had as much as 53 police cases registered against her name in Maharashtra.

"After taking over reins of the Gadchiroli unit a few years ago, she set up five different platoons -- an aggressive military force -- in her territory equipped with modern arms, ammunition and latest communication network to counter the state machinery."

— Hindustan Times

== Death ==
Narmada was reported to have been gunned-down during a fierce hour-long exchange of fire between the Maoists and State's police forces on 4 December 2012, near Hiker village, bordering Abujmarh of Chhattisgarh, in south Gadchiroli.

The Maoists managed to escape the scene along with her body; and her body is reported to have been buried at Malwada tribal village in Kanker district of Chhattisgarh.

After the encounter, the Superintendent of Police (Gadchiroli), Mohd. Suvej Haq, said to media personnels:

"The naxalite managed to carry the body and fled the scene. The intelligence sources identified the woman naxalite killed in the encounter as Narmada. We also hear about it from our sources. Now we are waiting for the confirmation from the naxalite."

She is reported to have been 57 years old when she died, by The Hindu, but Hindustan Times reports that she was 46. And, Rahul Pandita has written that Narmada's age was 48, when he and Vanessa interviewed her.

While the "police sources" also say that "Narmada Akka's funeral was carried out at a village in Chhattisgarh", the Maoists did not reach out to the media following the incident.

== See also ==
- Socialism
- Communism
- Marxism
- Leninism
- Marxism-Leninism-Maoism
- People's war
- New Democratic Revolution
- Radicalism (historical)
- Left-wing politics
- Naxalite-Maoist insurgency
- Anand
- Anuradha Ghandy
- Azad
- Charu Majumdar
- Ganapathy
- Kishenji
- Kobad Ghandy
- Kondapalli Seetharamaiah
- Kosa
- Prashant Bose
