= Gudivada mandal =

Mandal in Krishna district (Andhra Pradesh), India

- Mandal
- Interactive map of Gudivada mandal
- Location in Andhra Pradesh, India
- Coordinates: 16.43°N 80.99°E
- Country: India
- State: Andhra Pradesh
- District: Krishna
- Headquarters: Gudivada

Population (2011)
  - Total: 161,453

Languages
  - Official: Telugu
- Time zone: UTC+5:30 (IST)

Gudivada mandal is one of the 26 mandals in Krishna district of the state of Andhra Pradesh in India. It is under the administration of Gudivada revenue division and the headquarters are located at Gudivada. The mandal is bounded by Pedaparupudi, Nandivada, Mandavalli, Mudinepalle, Gudlavalleru, Pamarru mandals of Krishna district.

== Demographics ==
As of 2011 census, the mandal had a population of 161,453. The total population constitute, 80,752 males and 80,701 females —a sex ratio of 999 females per 1000 males. 14,932 children are in the age group of 0–6 years, of which 7,651 are boys and 7,281 are girls. The average literacy rate stands at 79.55% with 116,556 literates.

== Administration ==
The mandal is partially a part of the Andhra Pradesh Capital Region under the jurisdiction of APCRDA.

== Towns and villages ==
As of 2011 census, the mandal has 30 settlements. It includes 1 town and 29 villages. The settlements in the mandal are listed below:

1. Allidoddi
2. Bethavolu (rural)
3. Billapadu (rural)
4. Bommuluru
5. Chilakamudi
6. China Yerukapadu
7. Chirichintala
8. Chowtapalli
9. Dondapadu, Gudivada mandal
10. Gangadharapuram
11. Gudivada (M)†
12. Gudivada (rural)
13. Guntakoduru
14. Kalvapudi Agraharam
15. Kasipudi
16. Lingavaram
17. Mandapadu (rural)
18. Merakagudem
19. Moturu
20. Pedyerukapadu (rural)
21. Ramachandrapuram
22. Ramanapudi
23. Saidepudi
24. Seepudi
25. Seri Dintakurru
26. Seri Golvepalle
27. Seri Velpur
28. Siddhantam
29. Tativarru
30. Valivarthipadu (rural)

Note: †–Mandal Headquarters, M-Municipality

== See also ==
- List of villages in Krishna district
