= Vanapamula =

- Village
- Interactive map of Vanapamula
- Location in Andhra Pradesh, India Vanapamula (India)
- Coordinates: 16°26′N 80°56′E
- Country: India
- State: Andhra Pradesh
- District: Krishna
- Mandal: Pedaparupudi

Area
  - Total: 3.95 km^{2} (1.53 sq mi)

Population (2011)
  - Total: 1,714
  - Density: 434/km^{2} (1,120/sq mi)

Languages
  - Official: Telugu
- Time zone: UTC+5:30 (IST)

Vanapamula is a village in Krishna district of the Indian state of Andhra Pradesh. It is the mandal headquarters of Pedaparupudi mandal in Gudivada revenue division.
