= Kanumolu =

- Village
- Interactive map of Kanumolu
- Location in Andhra Pradesh, India
- Coordinates: 16°36′18″N 80°57′55″E
- Country: India
- State: Andhra Pradesh
- District: Krishna
- Revenue Division: Gudivada
- Mandal: Bapulapadu

Population (2011)
  - Total: 8,002

Languages
  - Official: Telugu
- Time zone: UTC+5:30 (IST)
- PIN: 521106
- Telephone code: 08656
- Vehicle registration: AP 16 XX XXXX
- Parliament constituency: Machilipatnam
- Assembly constituency: Gannavaram

Kanumolu is a village in Krishna district of the Indian state of Andhra Pradesh. It is located in Bapulapadu mandal of Gudivada revenue division. It is one of the villages in the mandal to be a part of Andhra Pradesh Capital Region.
