= Maganti Ankineedu =

Indian independence activist and politician (1915–2008)

MP
- Constituency: Machilipatnam

Personal details
- Born: 1 January 1915 Tamirisa, Madras Presidency, British India (present-day Tamirisa, Krishna district, Andhra Pradesh, India)
- Died: 8 September 2008 (aged 93)
- Party: Indian National Congress
- Spouse: Smt.Saradamba
- Relatives: Kavuri Sambasiva Rao (son-in-law); Maganti Murali Mohan (nephew); Venu Thottempudi (nephew); Maganti Rajendra Prasad (Son) Chairman of soma Enterprise limited

Maganti Ankineedu (1 January 1915 – 8 September 2008) was an Indian independence activist, politician and Member of parliament, Lok Sabha.

He was born to Maganti Venkata Ramdas at Tamirisa village, nandivada mandal Krishna district. He was educated at Hindu College, Machilipatnam.

He participated in the Indian independence movement and imprisoned twice during the Civil Disobedience Movement and the Quit India Movement.

He was elected to 3rd Lok Sabha, 4th Lok Sabha, 5th Lok Sabha, from Gudivada constituency and 6th Lok Sabha and 7th Lok Sabha from Machilipatnam constituency as a member of Indian National Congress in 1962,1967,1972,1977 and 1980 respectively.

== Family ==
He is the uncle of Telugu film actor Venu Thottempudi
