= Remalle =

- village
- Interactive map of Remalle
- Location in Andhra Pradesh, India
- State: Andhra Pradesh
- State: Krishna district

Languages
  - Official: T:elugu
- Time zone: UTC+5:30 (IST)
- Vehicle registration: AP

Remalle is a village in Krishna district of the Indian state of Andhra Pradesh. It is located in Bapulapadu mandal of Gannavaram revenue division. It is one of the villages in the mandal to be a part of Andhra Pradesh Capital Region. Remalle is further divided into two parts, New Remalle (Kotha Remalle) and Old Remalle (Patha Remalle).

== Kotha ==
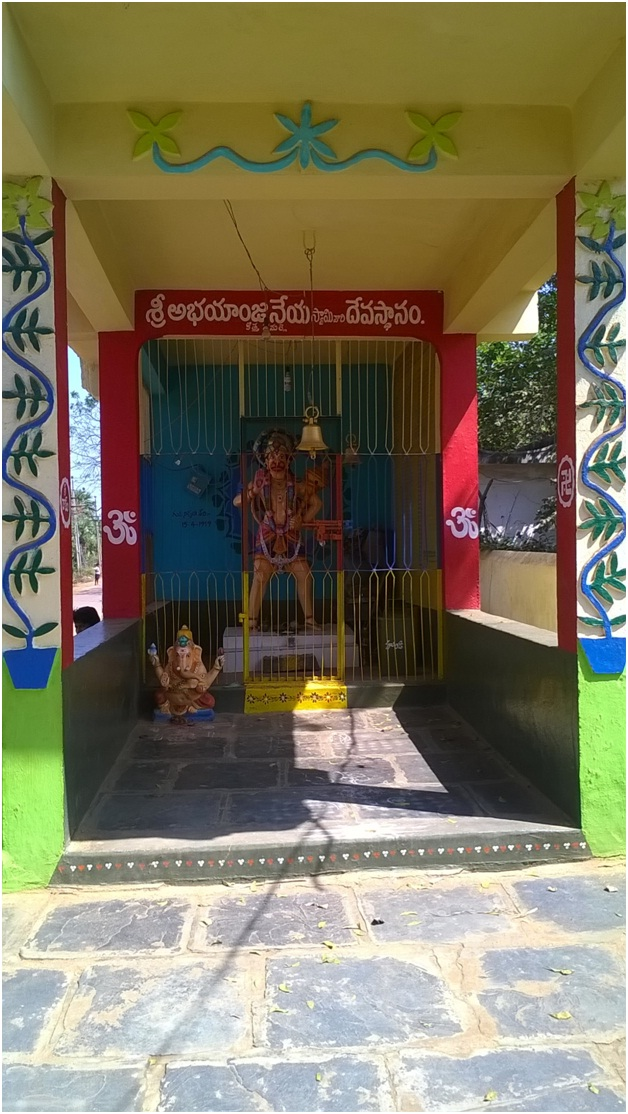
Hanuman Temple in Kotha Remalle Village

Kotha Remalle is a small village which is located in Bapulapadu Mandal. The village has 200 houses and a population of 1,700 people.
