= Nimmaluru =

Nimmakuru
- Village
- Interactive map of Nimmakuru
- Location in Andhra Pradesh, India Nimmakuru (India)
- Coordinates: 16.2703°N 80.9967°E
- Country: India
- State: Andhra Pradesh
- District: Krishna district

Population (2011)
  - Total: 1,000

Languages
  - Official: Telugu
- Time zone: UTC+5:30 (IST)
- PIN: 521158
- Telephone code: +91-(0)8674
- Vehicle registration: AP-16

Nimmakuru is a village in Krishna district of the Indian state of Andhra Pradesh. It is located in Pamarru mandal of Gudivada revenue division.
