= Venna Vallabha Rao =

Indian Poet, Author and Professor in Telugu and Hindi

Dr. Venna Vallabha Rao
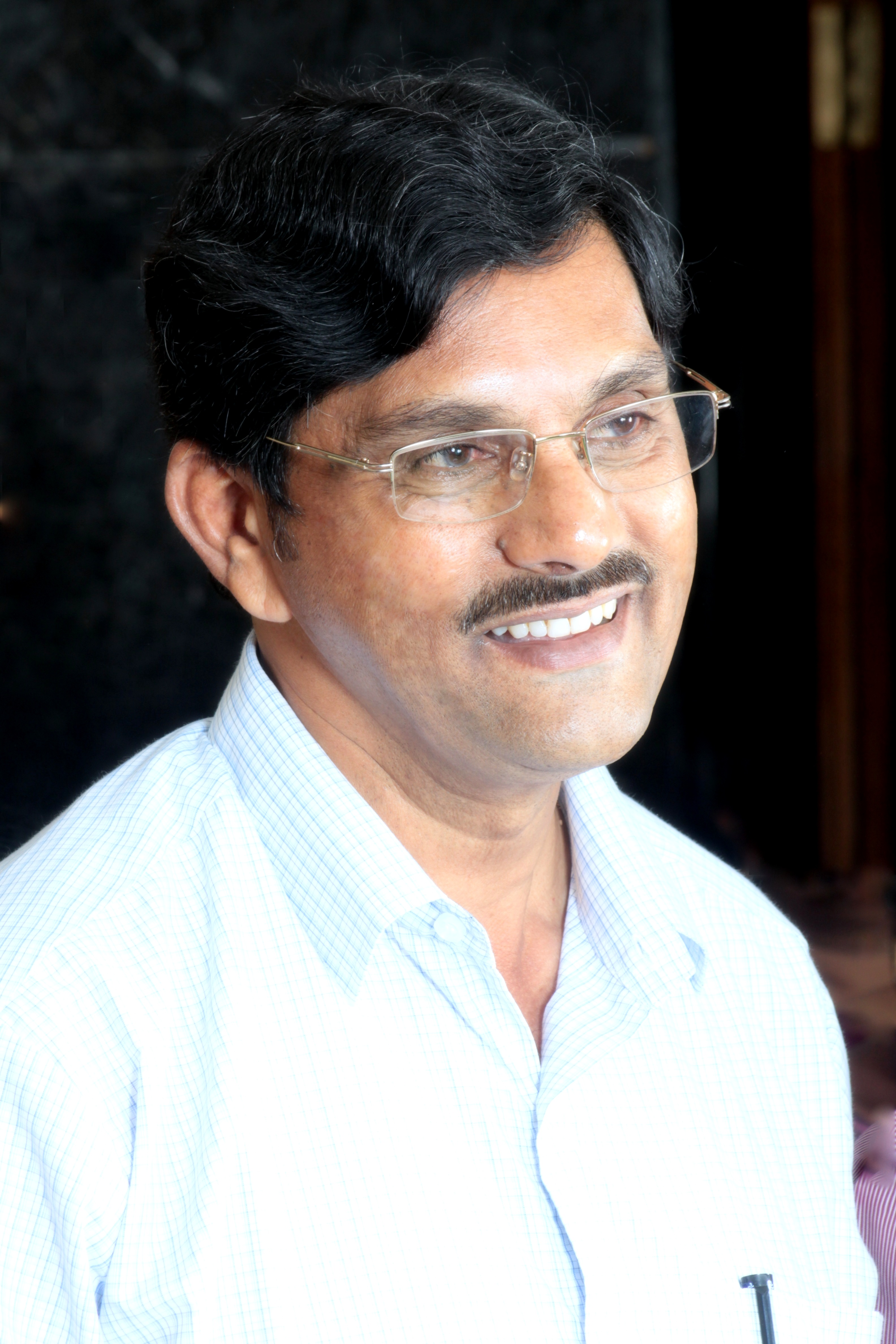
- Born: 9 May 1956 (age 69); Gudivada, Andhra Pradesh
- Education: M.A. (Hindi) in 1979 and Ph.D. in 1989 from Andhra University, Visakhapatnam
- Alma mater: Andhra University
- Occupations: Professor; Author; Poet
- Notable work: Viraamamerugani Payanam; Jathiya Pataka Rupasilpi Pingali Venkayya; Maro Kunthi
- Awards: Sahitya Akademi Award for Translation in Telugu 2017

Venna Vallabha Rao is an Indian author, poet, and translator from Hindi to Telugu and vice versa. He is a recipient of the 2017 Sahitya Akademi Award. for his translation work Viraamamerugani Payanam (Restless journey) based on Khanabadosh which is an autobiography of Punjabi writer Ajeet Cour.

== Early life and career ==
Venna Vallabha Rao was born on 9 May 1956 in Gudivada, Andhra Pradesh, to a Telugu family of Venna Hanumantha Rao and Lakshmi Nageswaramma. His father was a farmer, and his mother was a housewife. He completed his schooling in Bethavolu near Gudivada. He completed his graduation with a B.A.degree from ANR College, Gudivada, in 1977. He completed post-graduation and received his Master of Arts (Hindi) degree from Andhra University, Visakhapatnam, in 1979. He received Ph.D. for his thesis on "Bhagwati Charan Verma ke Upanyason mein Vyakti aur Samaj" (Hindi: भगवती चरण वर्मा के उपन्यासों में व्यक्ति और समाज) in 1989.

Dr. Vallabha Rao started his teaching career as a Junior Hindi Lecturer at Saptagiri College in Vijayawada for five years, from 1980 until 1985. Later, he worked as a Hindi Lecturer, Reader, Head of the Department (Hindi), and Vice-Principal at Andhra Loyola College (Autonomous) in Vijayawada for 29 years from 1985 to 2014.

During his tenure at Andhra Loyola College (Autonomous), Dr. Vallabha Rao served as the Program Officer, National Service Scheme (NSS) for ten years and as the Secretary of the Andhra Loyola College Staff Co-operative Credit Society for ten years. Dr Vallabha Rao has translated 125 poems from Hindi into Telugu, 75 poems from Telugu into Hindi, several radio plays from Telugu into Hindi and radio features from Hindi into Telugu. He had presented over 50 lessons in Hindi on All India Radio, Vijayawada, and given radio talks, too.

Dr. Vallabha Rao attended World Hindi Conferences (Hindi: विश्व हिंदी सम्मेलन) and World Telugu Writers Conferences. He participated in the 8th World Hindi Conference held in New York City, USA, in July 2007, the 10th World Hindi Conference held in Bhopal, India, in September 2015, and the 11th World Hindi Conference held in Port Louis, Mauritius, in August 2018.

Dr. Vallabha Rao attended the 3rd World Telugu Writers Conference (Telugu: మూడవ ప్రపంచ తెలుగు రచయితల సదస్సు) organized by Krishna District Writers Association held in Vijayawada in February 2015 and also chaired a session on the topic "Telugu Sahitya Vikasam – Anuvaadaala paatra" (Telugu: తెలుగు సాహిత్య వికాసం – అనువాదాల పాత్ర). He also attended the 5th World Telugu Writers Conference (Telugu: ఐదవ ప్రపంచ తెలుగు రచయితల సదస్సు) held in Singapore in November 2016 and presented a paper on the topic "Telugu Rachanalu Hindi Anuvaadalu: Telugu Bhasha parivyapti" (Telugu: తెలుగు రచనలు హిందీ అనువాదాలు: తెలుగు భాష పరివ్యాప్తి).

He retired as Head of Department (Hindi) in 2014 and currently resides in Vijayawada, Andhra Pradesh.

== Literary works ==
=== Telugu ===
- Jaathiya Pataka Rupasilpi Pingali Venkayya (Telugu: జాతీయ పతాక రూపశిల్పి పింగళి వెంకయ్య) is a book written in Telugu about Indian National Flag designer Pingali Venkayya was published in July 2016. This book is also translated into English by Bollimuntha Nagesawara Rao under the title Pingali Venkayya - Designer of the Tricolour and was published in December 2023.
- Kavitaa Bhaarathi (Telugu: కవితా భారతి) is an anthology of translated poems to Telugu was published in January 2011
- Arigapudi Ramesh Chowdary - Jeevitam, Rachanalu (Telugu: అరిగపూడి రమేష్ చౌదరి - జీవితం, రచనలు) is a book written in Telugu was published in July 2012.
- Viraamamerugani Payanam (Telugu: విరామమెరుగని పయనం) is a translated autobiography Khanabadosh of Punjabi writer Ajeet Cour to Telugu was published in January 2012.
- Saahitya Vaaradhi (Telugu: సాహిత్య వారధి) is a collection of critical essays in Telugu was published in January 2011.
- Telugu Bhasha, Sanskruti Chaitanya Yatralu (Telugu: తెలుగు భాష, సంస్కృతీ చైతన్యయాత్రలు) written in Telugu by Dr. Venna Vallabha Rao and Dr. Gumma Sambasiva Rao was published in January 2009.
- YLP Intintai Vatudintayai... (Telugu: వై.ఎల్.పి ఇంతింతై వటుడింతై...) written in Telugu about Yarlagadda Lakshmi Prasad by Dr. Venna Vallabha Rao on the occasion of Annual Meeting of "Mitrama Swagatam" (Alumni Meeting of ANR College, Gudivada 1971-78 Batches) was published in February 2019.
- Maro Kunti - Naati Neti Hindi Kathalu (Telugu: మరో కుంతి - నాటి నేటి హిందీ కథలు) written in Telugu is a translated collection of Hindi short stories was published in January 2024.

=== Hindi ===
- Bhagwati Charan Verma ke Upanyason mein Vyakti aur Samaj (Hindi: भगवती चरण वर्मा के उपन्यासों में व्यक्ति और समाज) is Ph.D thesis of Venna Vallabha Rao which earned him the Doctorate degree from Andhra University. The book was published in December 2006.
- Pingali Venkayya (Hindi: पिंगलि वेंकय्या) is a book written in Hindi about Indian National Flag designer Pingali Venkayya was published in September 2015.
- Chote Kumar (Hindi: छोटे कुमार) is a Hindi translation of Telugu book China babu written by Polavarapu Koteswara Rao was published in May 2010.
- 21veen Shatabdee ki Telugu Kavitha (Hindi: 21वीण शताब्दी की तेलुगु कविता) is a translation of contemporary Telugu poetry to Hindi was published in November 2013.
- Corona kaa Kohraam (Hindi: कोरोना का कोहराम - चलपाका प्रकाश के नन्हें मुक्तक) is a Hindi translation of Telugu book Corona Naanilu by Chalapaka Prakash was published in December 2022.
- Mahaashunya (Hindi: महाशून्य) is a Hindi translation of Telugu poems book Mahaashunyam by Deerghasi Vizai Bhaskar was published in December 2023.
- Hawa ka Rang (Hindi: हवा का रंग) is a Hindi translation of Gaali Rangu written by Devi Priya in Telugu was published in January 2024.

== Recognition ==
- Pondicherry University, Kalapet, Pondicherry has incorporated the book "21vee Shatabdee ki Telugu Kavitha’’(Hindi: 21वीण शताब्दी की तेलुगु कविता) (Course Code: HIND 577) for M.A. (Hindi) program.
- Balbharati (The Maharashtra State Bureau of Textbook Production and Curriculum Research, Pune) has incorporated 3 articles written by Dr. Vallabha Rao as lessons in curriculum for classes X, XI and XII of Telugu Medium Schools in state of Maharashtra, India.
  - Article titled Keerthi Chakra - Jagadish Chand (Telugu: కీర్తిచక్ర - జగదీష్ చంద్) was added to Kumara Bharati (Class X Telugu textbook) as a prose lesson.
  - Article titled Saahasa Mahilala Saagarayaanam (Telugu: సాహస మహిళల సాగరయానం) was added to Yuva Bharati (Class XI Telugu textbook) as a prose lesson.
  - Article titled Antariksha Vignananiki Velugubaata - Sriharikota (Telugu: అంతరిక్ష విజ్ఞానానికి వెలుగుబాట - శ్రీహరికోట) was added to Yuva Bharati (Class XII Telugu textbook) as a prose lesson.
- Dr. Vallabha Rao served as a member of Board of Studies for the following institutions in Andhra Pradesh:
  - Ch S.D. St. Theresa's College for Women (Autonomous), Eluru.
  - PB Siddhartha College of Arts & Science (Autonomous), Vijayawada (University Nominee)
  - Montessori Mahila Kalasala (Autonomous), Vijayawada.
  - AG & SG Siddhartha College, Vuyyuru
  - Sri Durga Malleswara Siddartha Mahila Kalasala College for Women (Autonomous),Vijayawada
  - J.M.J College for Women (Autonomous), Tenali.
  - Maris Stella College (Autonomous), Vijayawada (University Nominee)
  - P.G. Department of Hindi, Acharya Nagarjuna University, Guntur.
  - P.G. Department Of Hindi, Adikavi Nannaya University, Rajahmundry.
  - Government Arts College (Autonomous), Rajahmundry.
- On the occasion of 75th Anniversary of Indian Independence, Pingali Venkayya was recognized and honored for his contributions for India. Dr. Vallabha Rao being author of the biography of Pingali Venkayya, was interviewed by The New Indian Express newspaper to shed some light on the facts about the freedom fighter.
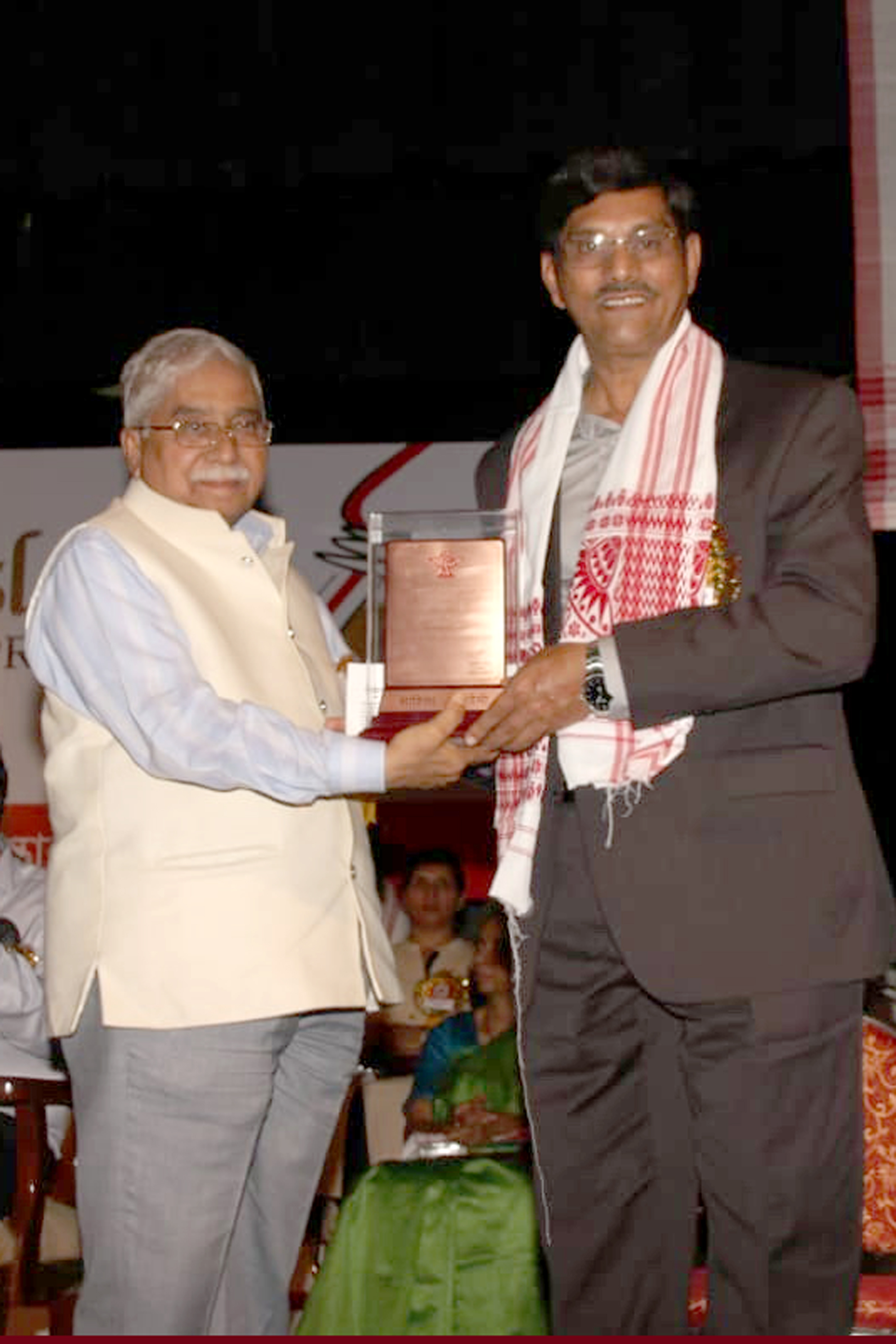
  Dr. Venna Vallabha Rao receiving Sahitya Akademi Award in June 2018 at Guwahati, Assam.

== Awards ==
- Hindi translation of Telugu play Nallanivadu received National Award in Annual National Level Competitions of All India Radio in 1986.
- Best Translation Award from Andhra Pradesh Hindi Academy in September 2011.
- Received Sri Boyapati Nageswara Rao and Smt.Subhadra Devi Hindi Prachar Gurupeeth Award from Hindi Mahavidyalaya, Tenali in October 2011.
- Honored with title "Anuvada Sahitya Ratna" (Telugu: అనువాద సాహిత్య రత్న) from Andhra Arts Academy, Vijayawada in July 2014.
- Translation Prize (Telugu) from Sahitya Akademi in 2017.
- Ugadi Puraskaram received from Andhra Pradesh State Government in 2017.
- Acharya Gangappa Sahitya Puraskaram in 2025.
