= Narmada (disambiguation) =

The Narmada River is in central India.

Narmada or Nerbudda may also refer to:

- Narmada district of Gujarat, India
- Nerbudda Division, a division of British India
- Narmada Akka (died 2012), a former member of the Central Committee of Communist Party of India (Maoist)
- Nerbudda incident, 1842 execution of Indian lascars from the transport ship Nerbudda in Taiwan during the First Opium War

== See also ==
- Narmad, Indian writer
