= Pasumarru, Krishna District =

Pasumarru
- Village
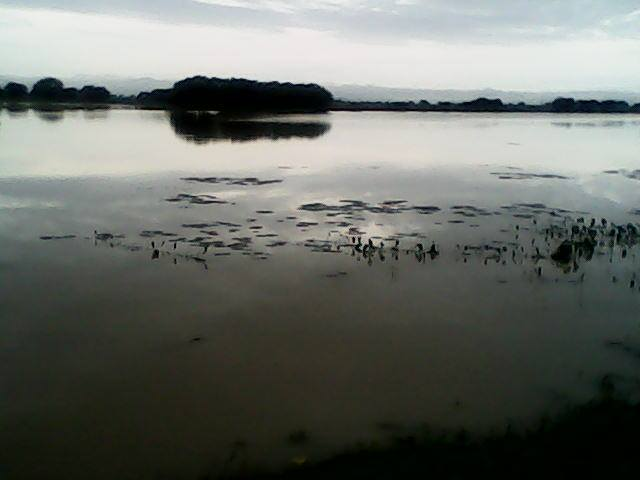
- A lake in Pasumarru
- Interactive map of Pasumarru
- Location in Andhra Pradesh, India Pasumarru (India)
- Coordinates: 16°18′41″N 81°0′21″E
- Country: India
- State: Andhra Pradesh
- District: Krishna

Area
  - Total: 9.19 km^{2} (3.55 sq mi)

Population (2011)
  - Total: 1,863
  - Density: 203/km^{2} (525/sq mi)

Languages
  - Official: Telugu
- Time zone: UTC+5:30 (IST)
- PIN: 521157
- Lok Sabha constituency: Machilipatnam
- Vidhan Sabha constituency: Pamarru

Pasumarru is a village in Krishna district of the Indian state of Andhra Pradesh. It is located in Pamarru mandal in Gudivada revenue division.
