= Tamirisa =

- Village
- Interactive map of Tamirisa
- Location in Andhra Pradesh, India
- Country: India
- State: Andhra Pradesh
- District: Krishna

Area
  - Total: 21.00 km^{2} (8.11 sq mi)

Population (2011)
  - Total: 3,776
  - Density: 179.8/km^{2} (465.7/sq mi)

Languages
  - Official: Telugu
- Time zone: UTC+5:30 (IST)
- Vehicle registration: AP

Tamirisa is a village in Krishna district of the Indian state of Andhra Pradesh. It is located in Nandivada mandal of Gudivada revenue division. It is one of the villages in the mandal to be a part of Andhra Pradesh Capital Region.

== Demographics ==
According to Indian census, 2001, the demographic details of this village is as follows:

- Total Population: 4,194 in 1,069 Households.
- Male Population: 2,145 and Female Population: 2,049
- Children Under 6-years: 450 (Boys - 234 and Girls - 216)
- Total Literates: 2,467
