= Pasumarru =

Pasumarru may refer to any of the two villages in Andhra Pradesh, India:

- Pasumarru, Guntur district
- Pasumarru, Krishna District
