= Nandivada =

- Village
- Interactive map of Nandivada
- Location in Andhra Pradesh, India Nandivada (India)
- Coordinates: 16°29′43″N 80°59′15″E
- Country: India
- State: Andhra Pradesh
- District: Krishna
- Mandal: Nandivada

Area
  - Total: 11.76 km^{2} (4.54 sq mi)

Population (2011)
  - Total: 2,450▲
  - Density: 208/km^{2} (540/sq mi)

Languages
  - Official: Telugu
- Time zone: UTC+5:30 (IST)
- Vehicle registration: AP

Nandivada is a village in Krishna district of the Indian state of Andhra Pradesh. It is located in Nandivada mandal of Gudivada revenue division. It is one of the villages in the mandal to be a part of Andhra Pradesh Capital Region. Geographically, it is 8 kilometres north of Gudivada and directly adjacent to the town of Sreenivasapuram.

Population
Year	Pop.	±% p.a.
1866	694	—
1871	903	+5.41%
1901	1,712	+2.16%
1911	1,679	−0.19%
1921	1,960	+1.56%
1931	2,260	+1.43%
1951	2,432	+0.37%
1961	2,430	−0.01%
1971	2,844	+1.59%
1981	2,821	−0.08%
1991	2,808	−0.05%
2001	2,446	−1.37%
2011	2,450	+0.02%

== Demographics ==
Religion in Nandivada (2011).
1. Hinduism (91.9%)
2. Christianity (7.40%)
3. Islam (0.40%)
4. Other (0.30%)

As of 2011 Census of India, the town had a population of 2,450. The total population is constituted of 1,221 males, 1,229 females, and 203 children in the age group of 0–6 years. The average literacy rate stands at 75.30% with 1,692 literates, significantly higher than the national average of 73.00%.

=== Religion ===
Nandivada was predominantly Hindu for centuries. According to census records, prior to 1911, no Christians were recorded to have resided in Nandivada village. In 2001 it was recorded that all Madigas and 61% of Malas, historically untouchable castes, were Christian.

A Chidananda ashram was built in the village in 1966 with land allotted by Sri Adusumilli Nagayya. The ashram was run by Nagayya's daughter, Smt. Dasari Meenakshamma, from 1969 to 1996, and was later taken over by her son and is now run by her daughter-in-law. It was said people from as far as Mopidevi would travel to the ashram.

Initially, Nandivada had a substantial Christian population, mostly gained during the Great Depression as converts to Christianity were often given land by missionaries. However, as of the 2011 census, the Christian population decreased.

Caste-wise Distribution of Households and Population in Nandivada, 2001
Caste Name	Number of households	Percent of total households	Population	Percent of total population	Average size of household	Percent of Christians within caste
FCs	143	20.97%	463	18.93%	3.24	0.86%
Reddy	50	7.33%	190	7.77%	3.80	2.11%
Kamma	61	8.94%	172	7.03%	2.82	0.00%
Komati	16	2.35%	53	2.17%	3.31	0.00%
Kapu	10	1.47%	32	1.31%	3.20	0.00%
Brahmin	6	0.88%	16	0.65%	2.67	0.00%
OBCs	321	47.07%	1172	47.91%	3.65	2.05%
Yadava	128	18.77%	487	19.91%	3.80	1.23%
Uppari	73	10.70%	249	10.18%	3.41	3.21%
Turpukapu	30	4.40%	115	4.70%	3.83	0.00%
Nayibrahmin	29	4.25%	105	4.29%	3.62	0.95%
Kvelama	23	3.37%	83	3.39%	3.61	2.41%
Gowda	12	1.76%	44	1.80%	3.67	9.09%
Rajaka	10	1.47%	39	1.59%	3.90	7.69%
Kummari	6	0.88%	15	0.61%	2.50	0.00%
Musalman	4	0.59%	13	0.53%	3.25	0.00%
Vbrahmin	3	0.44%	11	0.45%	3.67	0.00%
Padmasaaleelu	2	0.29%	7	0.29%	3.50	0.00%
Haridasulu	1	0.15%	4	0.16%	4.00	0.00%
SCs	218	31.96%	811	33.16%	3.72	62.64%
Mala	208	30.50%	768	31.40%	3.69	60.55%
Madiga	10	1.47%	43	1.76%	4.30	100.00%
Total	682	100%	2446	100%	3.59	21.91%

== History ==
=== Early history ===
Initially, Nandivada experienced explosive growth as the result of in-migration from dry areas in Krishna district after the devastating results of the Guntur famine of 1832. The first village headman, or munsif, of Nandivada, was Adusumilli Ankanna, around the 1850s. Adusumilli Ankanna was also a distant relative of Adusumilli Lingayya, who built the Nagendra Swamy Temple in Nandivada. Ankanna's daughter, "Mooga (Note: "Mooga" anglicized from Mūga (Telugu: మూగ), meaning mute.)" Mahalakshmamma, was married to Vemulapalli Pedda Kodandaramayya. Thereafter, all village munsifs came from the Vemulapalli family, until the munsif system was abolished. The position of Karanam was held by the Brahmin Nandivada family from the early 20th century until the position's abolition.

=== Freedom Struggle ===
Many freedom fighters originated from or held activities in Nandivada.

On 25 May 1932, Nutakki Sitaramamma (1914–1934) (Note: Resident of Komaravolu, Gudivada Taluk. The wife of Nutakki Gopalakrishnayya, she gave birth in prison and died shortly after being released.), Surapaneni (née Punukula) Venkata Subbamma (born 1912) (Note: Resident of Pamulapadu, Gudivada Taluk. Wife of Surapaneni Gopalakrishnayya and daughter of Punukula Jogayya), and Chagarlamudi (née Vellanki) Kameswaramma (Note: Resident of Ventrapragada, Gudivada Taluk. Wife of Chagarlamudi Brahmananda Rao "Brahmanandam" and daughter of Vellanki Venkata Ramayya. Kameswaramma's husband was also arrested for pro-independence activities in 1932.) were arrested at Nandivada.

Panuri Sundaramma (died 1960) and her husband, Venkata Reddy, participated in the independence struggle and they were arrested on 27 June 1932. Her husband worked for the Indian National Congress from 1930 to 1942.

Gadireddi (née Kondapalli) Putlamma (born 1911) was the daughter of Kondapalli Venka Reddy and wife of Gadireddi Raghava Reddy. She was sentenced to ten months' imprisonment for distributing pro-Congress bulletins on 16 March 1933, and was later released on 31 August 1933 as a term of the Gandhi–Irwin Pact.

=== Mandal Status ===
When Andhra Pradesh was reorganized into mandals by NTR on 29 July 1986, Nandivada was declared as part of Moturu mandal. A few days later the decision was reversed and Nandivada was given its own mandal status, under the suggestion of Dasari Gopala Krishna. Gopala Krishna was NTR's close friend and fellow actor and he would also enter politics, serving as Nandivada's panchayat president from 1988 to his death in 1992. Nandivada's mandal status was one of only two changes to NTR's bill, the other addition being the mandal status of Pedaparupudi, a case pleaded by Cherukuri Ramoji Rao.

== See also ==
- Villages in Nandivada mandal
