= K. G. Satyamurthy =

Naxalite leader of CPI (ML) People's war

Kambhampati Gnana Satyamurthy (15 July 1931 - 17 April 2012), popular as K. G. Satyamurthy, was a Dalit naxalite leader and writer from Andhra Pradesh, India. He was one of the founders of People's War Group. He was an associate of Kondapalli Seetharamaiah, the founder of PWG.

== Early life and education ==
Satyamurthy was born on 15 July 1931 at Shankarampadu village, Nandivada mandal, Krishna district, Andhra Pradesh. He did his schooling at Gudivada and completed his post graduation in political science at Andhra University, Visakhapatnam. He married Manemma and together they had two sons and two daughters, Anupama and Sridevi.

== Career ==
Satyamurthy was active in student politics and was involved with the Community Party of India. He was also the leader of the Rickshaw Karmika Sangham at Gudivada during his college days. After his post-graduation, he joined as a sub-editor in Visalaandhra Telugu daily at Guntur. Then, he also served as the editor of Yuvajanam, a daily in Guntur, for a short period. Later, he became a lecturer at Warangal where he met Kondapalli Seetharamaiah, a Hindi teacher in 1960. Influenced by Marxism, they became friends.

In 1966, he led the 'Visakha Ukku, Andhrula Hakku' agitation for demanding a Steel Plant in Visakhapatnam. He was influenced by the Naxalbari movement and along with K. Seetharamaiah founded the People's War Group in 1968. In 1972, he was arrested and was only released in 1975. He was the general secretary of PWG when Seetharamaiah was arrested from 1980. Later, he left the party due to internal differences on issues.

=== Writer ===
Satyamurthy used the pen name, Sivasagar and wrote many poems including 'Udyamam Nela Baludu', 'Ambedkar Suryudu' and 'Guerrilla', a collection of poems. Some of his writings became popular in the Telugu revolutionary literature. All his poetry was published in the form of a magazine by Virasam leader Varavara Rao.

=== Death ===
He died on 17 April 2012, at the home of his son K. Prasanna Siddhant in Kandulapadu village, G Konduru mandal, Krishna district, Andhra Pradesh. Before coming to Kandulapadu, he stayed with his younger daughter for a long in Visakhapatnam. His body was cremated in Vijayawada.
