= Rimmanapudi =

- Village
- Interactive map of Rimmanapudi
- Location in Andhra Pradesh, India Rimmanapudi (India)
- Coordinates: 16.3350°N 80.9950°E
- Country: India
- State: Andhra Pradesh
- District: Krishna
- Mandal: Pamarru

Area
  - Total: 3.33 km^{2} (1.29 sq mi)

Population (2011)
  - Total: 1,080
  - Density: 324/km^{2} (840/sq mi)

Languages
  - Official: Telugu
- Time zone: UTC+5:30 (IST)

Rimmanapudi is a village in Krishna district of the Indian state of Andhra Pradesh. It is located in Pamarru mandal in Gudivada revenue division.

== See also ==
- Villages in Pamarru mandal
