= Chandrala, Gudlavalleru mandal =

Chandrala
- Village
- Interactive map of Chandrala
- Location in Andhra Pradesh, India Chandrala (India)
- Coordinates: 16°22′40″N 81°03′21″E
- Country: India
- State: Andhra Pradesh
- District: Krishna
- Mandal: Gudlavalleru

Area
  - Total: 5.70 km^{2} (2.20 sq mi)

Population (2011)
  - Total: 1,519

Languages
  - Official: Telugu
- Time zone: UTC+5:30 (IST)
- PIN: 521330
- Area code: 589605
- Vehicle registration: AP–16

Chandrala is a village in Krishna district of the Indian state of Andhra Pradesh. It is located in Gudlavalleru mandal of Gudivada revenue division.

== Demographics ==
As of 2011 census, Chandrala had a population of 1,519. The total population constitute, 772 males and 747 females —a sex ratio of 968 females per 1000 males. 140 children are in the age group of 0–6 years, of which 79 are boys and 61 are girls. The average literacy rate stands at 73.46% with 1,013 literates, significantly higher than the state average of 67.41%. It has a Government M.P.U.P. School, a Postal Office. Chandrala belongs to Mudinepalli Constituency Chandrala has also been selected as Indiramma Model Village.

== Climate ==
Chandrala falls in the hot humid region of the country, less than 32 miles from Bay of Bengal. During winter, the climate is moderate and pleasant. The hottest day typically occurs in May or June.

== See also ==
- Villages in Gudlavalleru mandal
- Singaluru
