= Chandrala =

Chandrala may refer to:

- Chandrala, Gudlavalleru mandal, a village in Gudlavalleru mandal of Krishna district, Andhra Pradesh, India
- Chandrala, Mylavaram mandal, a village in Mylavaram mandal of Krishna district, Andhra Pradesh, India
