= Ventrapragada =

- Village
- Interactive map of Ventrapragada
- Location in Andhra Pradesh, India Ventrapragada (India)
- Coordinates: 16°26′32.92″N 80°54′30.92″E
- Country: India
- State: Andhra Pradesh

Area
  - Total: 15.23 km^{2} (5.88 sq mi)

Population (2011)
  - Total: 6,500
  - Density: 430/km^{2} (1,100/sq mi)

Languages
  - Official: Telugu
- Time zone: UTC+5:30 (IST)

Ventrapragada is a village in Krishna district of the Indian state of Andhra Pradesh. It is the mandal headquarters of Pedaparupudi mandal in Gudivada revenue division.
