= List of Sahitya Akademi Translation Prize winners for Telugu =

List of winners of a literary honor in India

Part of a series on

Sahitya Akademi Awards
Category
Sahitya Akademi Award winners by language
- Assamese
- Bengali
- Bodo
- Dogri
- English
- Gujarati
- Hindi
- Kannada
- Kashmiri
- Konkani
- Maithili
- Malayalam
- Marathi
- Meitei (Manipuri)
- Nepali
- Odia
- Punjabi
- Rajasthani
- Sanskrit
- Santali
- Sindhi
- Tamil
- Telugu
- Urdu
Sahitya Akademi Translation Prizes
- Assamese
- Bengali
- Bodo
- Dogri
- English
- Gujarati
- Hindi
- Kannada
- Kashmiri
- Konkani
- Maithili
- Malayalam
- Marathi
- Meitei (Manipuri)
- Nepali
- Odia
- Punjabi
- Rajasthani
- Sanskrit
- Santali
- Sindhi
- Tamil
- Telugu
- Urdu
Sahitya Akademi Yuva Puraskar
- Assamese
- Bengali
- Bodo
- Dogri
- English
- Gujarati
- Hindi
- Kannada
- Kashmiri
- Konkani
- Maithili
- Malayalam
- Meitei (Manipuri)
- Marathi
- Nepali
- Odia
- Punjabi
- Rajasthani
- Sanskrit
- Santali
- Sindhi
- Tamil
- Telugu
- Urdu
Sahitya Akademi Bal Sahitya Puraskar
- Assamese
- Bengali
- Bodo
- Dogri
- English
- Gujarati
- Hindi
- Kannada
- Kashmiri
- Konkani
- Maithili
- Malayalam
- Meitei (Manipuri)
- Marathi
- Nepali
- Odia
- Punjabi
- Rajasthani
- Sanskrit
- Santali
- Sindhi
- Tamil
- Telugu
- Urdu
Related
- Eighth Schedule to the Constitution of India
- Official Languages Commission
- List of languages by number of native speakers in India

Sahitya Akademi Translation Prizes are awarded each year since 1989 by the Indian National Academy of Letters to writers for their outstanding translations work in the 24 languages.

== Recipients ==
Following is the list of recipients of Sahitya Akademi Translation Prizes for their works written in Telugu. The award, as of 2019, consisted of ₹50,000.

| Year | Translator | Title of the translation | Original Title | Original Language | Genre | Original Author | References |
|---|---|---|---|---|---|---|---|
| 1989 | Bezawada Gopala Reddy | Ravindruni Naatikalu | Bidayer Abhishap Chitrangada, etc., | Bengali | Play | Ravindranath Tagore | |
| 1990 | Charla Ganapathi Sastry | Ganapati Ramayana Sudha | Srimad Ramayanam | Sanskrit | Epic | Valmiki | |
| 1991 | C. R. Sarma | Tirukkural | Tirukkural | Tamil | Treatise | Tiruvalluvar | |
| 1992 | Yarlagadda Lakshmi Prasad | Tamas | Tamas | Hindi | Novel | Bhisham Sahni | |
| 1993 | Maddipatla Suri | Samayam Kani Samayam | Asamaya | Bengali | Novel | Bimal Kar | |
| 1994 | P. Adeshwar Rao | Amrutam Visham | Amrit aur Vish | Hindi | Novel | Amritlal Nagar | |
| 1995 | Bhargavi Prabhanjan Rao | Taladandam | Taledanda | Kannada | Play | Girish Karnad | |
| 1996 | Pullella Sriramachandrudu | Kavya Prakashamu | Kavya Prakasham | Sanskrit | Treatise | Mammata Bhatta | |
| 1997 | B. K. Eashwar | Gadachina Kalam | Kazhinja Kaalam | Malayalam | Novel | K. P. Kesava Menon | |
| 1998 | I. Panduranga Rao | Mettuku Pai Mettu | Enippadikal | Malayalam | Novel | Thakazhi Sivasankara Pillai | |
| 1999 | Vemaraju Bhanumurthi | Sagam Vennela Raatri | Aadh Chaanani Raat | Punjabi | Novel | Gurdial Singh | |
| 2000 | Revuri Ananta Padmanabha Rao | Chayarekhalu | Shadow Lines | English | Novel | Amitav Ghosh | |
| 2001 | Pingali Surya Sundaram | Atma Saakshatkaram | Self-Realisation | English | Biography | B. V. Narasimha Swamy | |
| 2002 | Deevi Subbarao | Maatannadi Jyotirlingam | Collection of Kannada Vachanas | Kannada | Poetry | Various authors | |
| 2003 | B. Ramabrahmam | Sri Devi Bhagavatam | Devi Bhagavatam | Sanskrit | Epic | Veda Vyasa | |
| 2004 | Gangisetty Lakshminarayana | Parva | Parva | Kannada | Poetry | S. L. Bhyrappa | |
| 2005 | G. S. Mohan | Masti Chinna Kathalu | Sanna Kathegallu | Kannada | Short stories | Masti Venkatesha Iyengar | |
| 2006 | Vimala Sarma | Bhaavartha Ramayanamu | Bhaavaartha Ramayana | Marathi | Poetry | Eknath | |
| 2007 | Mantripragada Seshabai | Antaraalu | Paalangal | Tamil | Novel | Sivashankari | |
| 2008 | Vadrevu Chinnaveerabhadrudu | Naa Desa Yuvajanulaara | Ignited Minds | English | Essays | A. P. J. Abdul Kalam | |
| 2009 | Prabhakar Mandara | Dalit Udyama Charitra | Dalit's Struggle for Identity | English | Study | Yagati Chinna Rao | |
| 2010 | G. Balaji | Kalyani | Oru Nadigai Naadagam Parkiraal | Tamil | Novel | D. Jayakanthan | |
| 2011 | S. Jayaprakash | Pratapa Mudaliyar Charitra | Prathapa Modaliyar Charitram | Tamil | Novel | Vedanyagam Pillai | |
| 2012 | R. Venkateswara Rao | Toli Charitraka Andhra Pradesh | Early History of Andhra Pradesh | English | Historical Essays | Edited by I. K. Sharma | |
| 2013 | Nalimela Bhaskar | Smaraka Silalu | Smaraka Silakal | Malayalam | Novel | Punathil Kunhabdulla | |
| 2014 | R. Santha Sundari | Intlo Premchand | Premchand Ghar Me | Hindi | Biography | Sivarani Devi Premchand | |
| 2015 | L. R. Swamy | Sufi Cheppina Katha | Sufi Paranja Katha | Malayalam | Novel | K. P. Ramanunni | |
| 2016 | Tankasala Ashok | Vallabhbhai Patel | Patel: A Life | English | Biography | Rajmohan Gandhi | |
| 2017 | Venna Vallabha Rao | Viraamamerugani Payanam | Khanabadosh | Punjabi | Autobiography | Ajeet Cour | |
| 2018 | A. Krishna Rao | Guppedu Sooryudu Mari Konni Kavithalu | A Handful of Sun And Other Poems | Dogri | Poetry | Padma Sachdev | |
| 2019 | P. Satyavati | Oka Hijda Aatmakatha | The Truth about me: A Hijra life story | English | Autobiography | A. Revathi | |
| 2020 | Ranganatha Ramachandra Rao | Om Namo | Om Namo | Kannada | Novel | Shantinatha Desai | |
| 2021 | K. Sajaya | Ashuddha Bharat | Adrishya Bharat | Hindi | Non Fiction | Bhasha Singh | |
| 2022 | Varala Anand | Akupacha Kavithalu | Green Poems | Hindi | Poetry | Gulzar | |
| 2023 | Elanaaga (N. Surendra) | Ghalib Naati Kaalam | Ghalib: The Man, The Times | English | Biography | Pavan Varma | |
| 2024 | Thurlapati Rajeswari | Eethachettu Devudu | Dadhi Buda | Odiya | Novel | Gopinath Mohanty | |

== See also ==
- List of Sahitya Akademi Award winners for Telugu
