= National Highway 214 (India) =

Highway linking Narasapuram and Pamarru

National Highway 165 (earlier NH 214) is a highway linking Narasapuram and Pamarru, both in the Indian state of Andhra Pradesh. It starts at Digamarru, and ends at Pamarru. It passes through West Godavari and Krishna districts. It covers a total distance of 106 kilometres (66 miles).

== Route ==
It passes through Narsapur (NH 216) to Palakollu, Bhimavaram, Akividu, Kaikaluru, Mandavalli, Mudinepalli, Gudivada to Pamarru on NH 65. State Highway 63 passes from Bhimavaram to Mudinepalli, both on NH 214. This route passes from Bhimavaram, Singarayapalem to Mudinepalli. It travels a total distance of 51 kilometres (32 miles).
