= Singaluru =

Singaluru is a hamlet of Chandrala in Krishna district, Andhra Pradesh, India.

It is located 1 km from Gudlavalleru. The population is around 500.
