= Bethavolu (rural) =

- Village
- Interactive map of Bethavolu
- Location in Andhra Pradesh, India Bethavolu (India)
- Coordinates: 16.430282°N 80.980200°E
- Country: India
- State: Andhra Pradesh
- District: Krishna

Area
  - Total: 6.29 km^{2} (2.43 sq mi)

Population (2011)
  - Total: 2,983 (Rural)
  - Density: 474/km^{2} (1,230/sq mi)

Languages
  - Official: Telugu
- Time zone: UTC+5:30 (IST)
- Vehicle registration: AP

Bethavolu is a village in Krishna district of the Indian state of Andhra Pradesh. It is located in Gudivada mandal of Gudivada revenue division. It is one of the villages in the mandal to be a part of Andhra Pradesh Capital Region.
