= Kurumaddali =

Coordinates: 16°20′N 80°56′E

Kurumaddali is a village in Krishna District, Andhra Pradesh, India. It is situated on the Machilipatnam - Vijayawada highway, 1 km. from Pamarru towards Vijayawada and 10 km from Vuyyuru. Pamarru is a Mandal Headquarters and a Legislative Assembly constituency. Pammaru has become Legislative Assembly constituency in the delimitation process held prior to the 2009 general elections.
