= V S Rama Das =

Indian botanist and fellow of Indian National Science Academy

Prof VSR Das
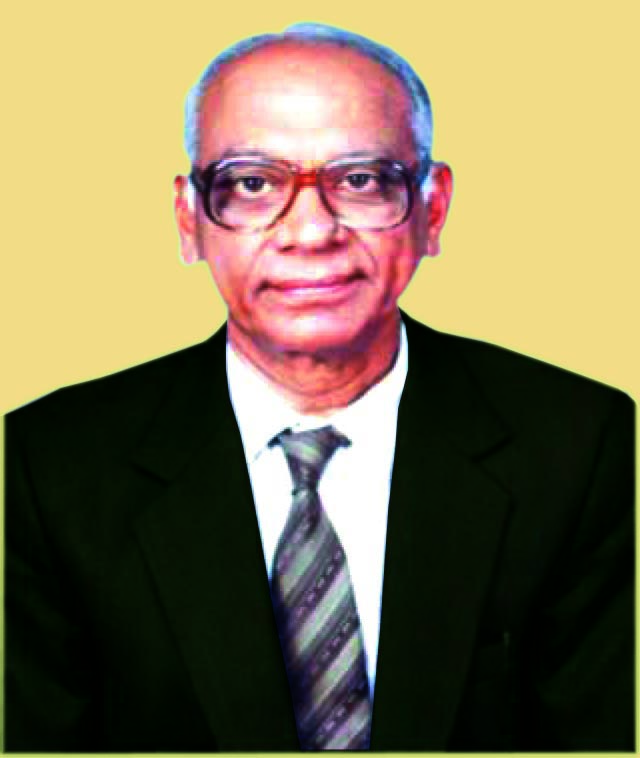
- Vallabhaneni Sita Rama Das
- Born: Vallabhaneni Sita Rama Das; 5 February 1933; Gudlavalleru, Krishna District, Andhra Pradesh, India
- Died: 9 December 2010 (aged 77)
- Known for: Photosynthesis

Prof Vallabhaneni Sita Rama Das (5 February 1933 – 9 December 2010) was an Indian botanist and a fellow of Indian National Science Academy.

== Early life and education ==
Rama Das was born on 5 February 1933 into an agriculture family in Gudlavalleru. Vankatappayya and Ratnamma were his father and mother. His family was into farm ownership. He did his BSc from Hindu College, Machilipatnam in 1951. He obtained his MSc in botany from Delhi University in 1953.

== Career ==
After finishing his M.Sc, Rama Das went to Sweden to work with mycologist Elias Melin at Institute of Physiological Botany, Uppsala University. At University of Uppsala, Rama Das worked on physiology of tree mycorrhiza. After that, Rama Das obtained DPhil in 1957 from the University of Oxford. For his D.Phil, he worked on metabolism of isolated chloroplasts. He did this study under Professor WO James. Then he worked at the University of Allahabad as Assistant professor of botany from 1957 to 1959. After that, he started his career at the SV University, Tirupati, as lecturer. He was later promoted to reader, then professor, and then head of the Botany Department. He also worked as dean, Faculty of Sciences, principal of the University College and later as rector at the SV University. He worked at SV University until 1988. He visited the University of California at Berkeley in 1959 to work with Professor Daniel Arnon. He also worked at the Memorial University of Newfoundland St. John’s NFLD, Canada, in 1967-69. He worked at the Central University at Hyderabad from 1988 to 1993 in the School of Life Sciences, where he was also CSIR Emeritus Scientist and professor emeritus till 1999. Thereafter, he served as visiting professor in Biotechnology at Nagarjuna University till 2005.

== Scientific contributions ==
Rama Das’s doctoral work was on photosynthesis and it resulted in isolation of biochemically pure chloroplasts for the first time, uncontaminated by the mitochondria. His main research activity was in the area of plant physiology covering photosynthesis. He carried out research in relation to foliar solar tracking behavior and photosynthesis. In 2004, he published a monograph on photosynthesis. Under his guidance, twenty students researched in plant physiology and obtained PhD from the SV university. He conducted several research projects as the principal investigator. These projects were sponsored by the Department of Atomic Energy, Government of India, Indian Council of Agricultural Research, US Department of Agriculture, Department of Science and Technology, Government of India and United Nations Environment Programme. He has authored over 200 research papers.

== Personal life ==
Rama Das married Ahalya Vemuri on 22 June 1951. They had a daughter, Kausalya Yarlagadda and son, Ravi Vallabhaneni.

== Death ==
Rama Das died on 9 December 2010.

== Honours and awards ==
Rama Das was awarded for Outstanding Achievement in Biological Sciences by FICCI for the year 1978. He received the Birabal Sahni Gold Medal by Indian Botanical Society in 1985. He was awarded JJ Chinoy Memorial Medal by Indian Society for Plant Physiology in1979. He was honored with Honor Summas Medal by Watumull Foundation, USA for the year 1987. He was awarded JC Bose Award by UGC for the year 1991 and the professor SB Saksene Memorial Award by INSA in 1996. He was president of the Indian Society for Plant Physiology for the year 1973 and Andhra Pradesh Akademi of Sciences for the year 1978-79. He was UGC National Lecturer in Botany twice, once in 1978-79 and the second time in 1985-86. He was also elected Fellow of the Indian Academy of Sciences, Bangalore; and the National Academy of Agricultural Sciences, New Delhi.

== See also ==
- National Academy of Sciences, India
- Plant physiology
