= Veleru =

- village
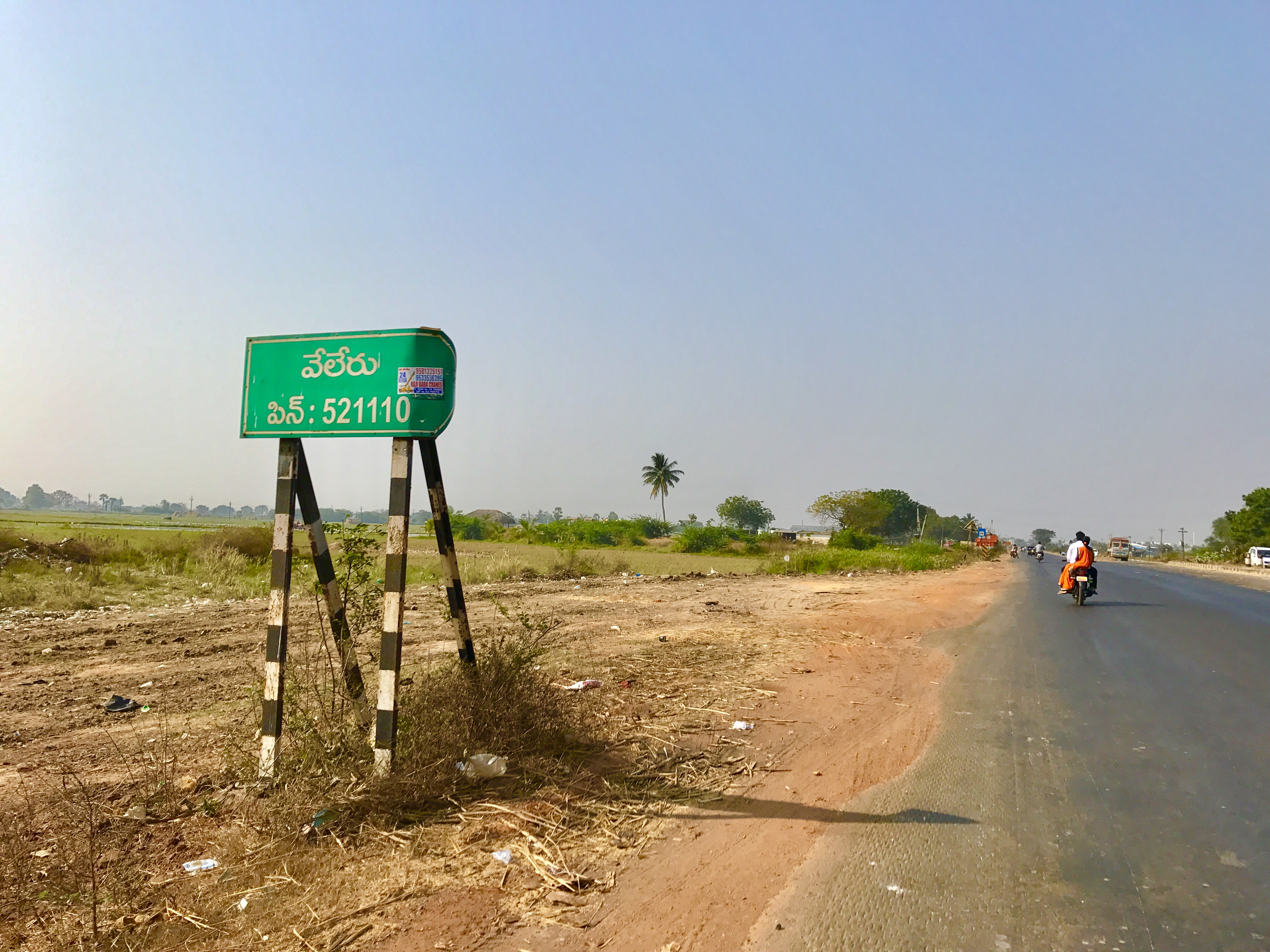
- Veleru Board on AH-45
- Interactive map of Veleru
- Location in Andhra Pradesh, India Veleru (India)
- Coordinates: 16.641397°N 80.941758°E
- Country: India
- State: Andhra Pradesh
- District: Krishna

Languages
  - Official: Telugu
- Time zone: UTC+5:30 (IST)
- PIN: 521110
- Vehicle registration: AP-

Veleru is a village in Krishna district of the Indian state of Andhra Pradesh. It is located in Bapulapadu mandal of Nuzvid revenue division. It is one of the villages in the mandal to be a part of Andhra Pradesh Capital Region.

Veleru is also a village in Khammam district of the Indian state of Andhra Pradesh. It is located in Burgamphad mandal.
