= Fractured Freedom =

2021 non-fiction book

Fractured Freedom: A Prison Memoir
- Author: Kobad Ghandy
- Language: English
- Genre: Memoir
- Publisher: Roli Books
- Publication date: 16 March 2021
- Publication place: India
- Media type: Hardcover
- Pages: 316
- ISBN: 978-8194969167

Fractured Freedom: A Prison Memoir is a memoir by Kobad Ghandy. The book mainly concerns his imprisonment of over a decade following accusations of being a member of the politburo of the Communist Party of India. The book is divided into three parts: "Motivation and Drive Behind Action", "A Decade in India's Prisons", and "Contemplation and Consideration of Justification". The book was published on 16 March 2021 in English by Roli Books. A Marathi translation was released soon after.

== Critical reception ==
=== English edition ===
Ghandy's memoir was met with critical acclaim. Mahmood Farooqui of the Hindustan Times wrote:

"The importance of this memoir and of being Kobad lies in shedding privilege, in adopting poverty and struggle, in choosing the right life, in suffering wrongs for it, and yet remaining steadfast. Fractured Freedom is a moral lesson for modern India, which both the Left and the Right would do well to heed".

Asim Ali of The Telegraph wrote:

"This is a sincere and lucid book, mercifully free of intellectual jargon or literary pretensions. It is also deeply moving at times, particularly when Ghandy writes about his wife. Whatever one makes of Ghandy's ideas, there are some important insights to be gleaned from his dramatic life".

=== Marathi edition ===
Sukumar Shidore of Loksatta wrote, "as the content of the book is multi-dimensional, it is hoped that the discerning reader will delve into its various aspects". Milind Champanerkar of The Wire wrote that "considering the singular images of 'gunmen, burakhadhari', it seems that this book can provide a lot of insight into reality, breaking through the myths about the extreme left".

== Controversy ==
The Government of Maharashtra withdrew a literature award it had given the Marathi translation of the memoir, citing objections that the book "promotes [the] violence of Naxalism". This initiated a strong reaction in the Marathi literary community, with awardees of the same competition Anand Karandikar and Shared Baviskar returning their rewards to the government. As a further sign of solidarity with Ghandy, several members of the jury that selects award-winning books resigned from the committee.
