= Moturu =

- Village
- Interactive map of Moturu
- Location in Andhra Pradesh, India
- Coordinates: 16°26′53″N 81°02′52″E
- Country: India
- State: Andhra Pradesh
- District: Krishna

Area
  - Total: 13.03 km^{2} (5.03 sq mi)

Population (2011)
  - Total: 4,092
  - Density: 314.0/km^{2} (813.4/sq mi)

Languages
  - Official: Telugu
- Time zone: UTC+5:30 (IST)
- PIN: 521323

Moturu is a village in Krishna district of the Indian state of Andhra Pradesh. It is located in Gudivada mandal of Gudivada revenue division. It is one of the villages in the mandal to be a part of Andhra Pradesh Capital Region.
