= National Highway 165 (India) =

National highway in India

National Highway 165
- Map of National Highway 165 in red

Route information
- Length: 107.40 km (66.74 mi)

Major junctions
- From: Pamarru
- To: Digamarru

Location
- Country: India
- Primary destinations: Mandavalli – Pallevada – Digamarru

Highway system
- Roads in India; Expressways; National; State; Asian
← NH 164	→ NH 166

National Highway 165 (NH 165), PP Road is a National Highway in the Indian state of Andhra Pradesh. It starts at Pamarru and terminates at Digamarru near (Palakollu)]]. It has a total length of 107.40 km (66.74 mi).

== History ==
It was known by National Highway 214 (India) in the old numbering

== See also ==
- List of national highways in Andhra Pradesh
