= Digamarru =

- Village
- Interactive map of Digamarru
- Location in India
- Coordinates: 16°29′30″N 81°42′55″E
- Country: India
- State: Andhra Pradesh
- District: West Godavari
- Mandal: Palakollu

Government
  - Serpanch: Pechetti Narashima Swamy
- Elevation: 14 m (46 ft)

Population (2011)
  - Total: 4,028

Languages
  - Official: Telugu
- Time zone: UTC+5:30 (IST)
- PIN: 534275
- Nearest city: Palakollu

Digamarru is a village in the West Godavari district in the state of Andhra Pradesh, India. It is close to the city of Palakollu and is located in its mandal.

== Demographics ==
As of 2011 Census of India, Digamarru had a population of 4,028. The total population constitute, 2,043 males and 1,985 females with a sex ratio of 972 females per 1,000 males. 412 children in the age group of 0–6 years lived in Digamarru, with the sex ratio being 881 females per 1,000 males. The average literacy rate stands at 78.93%, which is higher than the average literacy rate of Andhra Pradesh of 67.02%. 1,422 people were part of a scheduled caste. 2,116 people were workers, 1,884 of which had a permanent job. Agriculture-related jobs such as farming are common in Digamarru, with 1,127 people working in agricultural jobs as of 2011.

== Climate ==
The Köppen climate type is Aw (tropical savanna). The average high temperature of Digamarru in 2021 was 91 degrees, while the average low temperature was 78 degrees.

== Transportation ==
National Highway 165 connects the city with Pamarru. National Highway 216 also passes through Digamarru. Around July 2017, National Highway 216 from Digamarru to Ongole was enlarged from two lanes to four lanes by the National Highways Authority of India.
