= Pedaparupudi =

- Village
- Interactive map of Pedaparupudi
- Location in Andhra Pradesh, India Pedaparupudi (India)
- Coordinates: 16.4260°N 80.9548°E
- Country: India
- State: Andhra Pradesh
- District: Krishna
- Mandal: Pedaparupudi

Government
  - Member of Legislative Assembly: Kumar Raja Varla
  - Member of Parliament: Konakalla Narayana Rao

Area
  - Total: 5.89 km^{2} (2.27 sq mi)

Population (2011)
  - Total: 2,835
  - Density: 481/km^{2} (1,250/sq mi)

Languages
  - Official: Telugu
- Time zone: UTC+5:30 (IST)
- PIN: 521 xxx
- Vehicle registration: AP16
- Lok Sabha constituency: Machilipatnam
- Vidhan Sabha constituency: Pamarru

Pedaparupudi is a village in Krishna district of the Indian state of Andhra Pradesh. It is the mandal headquarters of Pedaparupudi mandal in Gudivada Revenue Division.

== Demographics ==
As of 2011 Census of India, the town had a population of 2,835. The total population constitute, 1,423 males, 1,412 females and 274 children, in the age group of 0–6 years. The average literacy rate stands at 79.34% with 2,032 literates, significantly higher than the national average of 73.00%.

== See also ==
- Villages in Pedaparupudi mandal
