= Gudivada (rural) =

- Village
- Interactive map of Gudivada (rural)
- Location in Andhra Pradesh, India
- Coordinates: 16.4448°N 81.0120°E
- Country: India
- State: Andhra Pradesh
- District: Krishna
- Mandal: Gudivada

Area
  - Total: 10.37 km^{2} (4.00 sq mi)

Population (2011)
  - Total: 6,285
  - Density: 606.1/km^{2} (1,570/sq mi)

Languages
  - Official: Telugu
- Time zone: UTC+5:30 (IST)

Gudivada (rural) is a village in Krishna district of the Indian state of Andhra Pradesh. It is located in Gudivada mandal of Nuzvid revenue division.

== See also ==
- Villages in Gudivada mandal
