= Bapulapadu mandal =

Bapulapadu
- Mandal
- Interactive map of Bapulapadu
- Location in Karnataka, India
- Coordinates: 16°38′11″N 80°57′58″E
- Country: India
- State: Andhra Pradesh
- District: Krishna
- Headquarters: Bapulapadu

Government
  - Body: Mandal Parishad

Area
  - Total: 226.63 km^{2} (87.50 sq mi)

Population (2011)
  - Total: 84,922
  - Density: 374.72/km^{2} (970.51/sq mi)

Languages
  - Official: Telugu
- Time zone: UTC+5:30 (IST)
- Vehicle registration: AP 16

Bapulapadu mandal is one of the 25 mandals in Krishna district of the Indian state of Andhra Pradesh. The headquarters of this mandal is located at Bapulapadu town. The mandal is bordered by Nuzvid mandal and Agiripalle mandal to the north, West Godavari district to the east, Nandivada mandal to the south and Unguturu mandal to the west.

== Demographics ==
As of 2011 census, the mandal had a population of 84,922 living in 24,036 households. The total population constituted 42,406 males and 42,516 females, for a sex ratio of 1,003 females per 1000 males. There were 8,403 children in the age group of 0–6 years, of which 4,359 were boys and 4,044 were girls, for a sex ratio of 928. The average literacy rate stands at 72.19% with 55,236 literates, of which 28,807 are males and 26,429 are females. There were 21,375 members of Scheduled Castes and 2,036 members of Scheduled Tribes.

=== Labor Statistics ===
As per the report published by Census of India in 2011, 42,835 people were engaged in work activities, including 26,215 males and 16,620 females. In the census, 39,636 workers describe their work as main work, 3,393 as cultivators, 26,510 as agricultural labourers, 462 in household industry and 9,271 were involved in other works. Of these, 3,199 were marginal workers.

== Administration ==
Bapulapadu mandal is administered under the Gannavaram Assembly constituency of the Machilipatnam Lok Sabha constituency. It is one of the 8 mandals those falls under Gudivada revenue division.

== Towns and villages ==
As of 2011 census, there are a total of 28 settlements in the mandal. Bapulapadu is the largest and Kuripirala is the smallest in terms of population.

The settlements in the mandal are:

1. Ampapuram
2. Arugolanu
3. Bandarugudem
4. Bapulapadu
5. Billanapalle
6. Bommuluru
7. Bommuluru Khandrika
8. Chirivada
9. Dantaguntla
10. Kakulapadu
11. Kanumolu
12. Kodurupadu
13. Kothapalle
14. Koyyuru
15. Kuripirala
16. Madicherla
17. Mallavilli
18. Ogirala
19. Ramannagudem
20. Rangannagudem
21. Remalli
22. Serinarasannapalem
23. Singannagudem
24. Sobhanadripuram
25. Tippanagunta
26. Veeravalli
27. Veleru
28. Venkatapuram
29. Venkatrajugudem

== Education ==
The mandal plays a major role in education for the rural students of nearby villages. The primary and secondary school education is imparted by government, aided by private schools, under the School Education Department of the state. As per the school information report for the academic year 2015–16, the mandal has more than 9,583 students enrolled in over 103 schools.

== See also ==
- List of mandals in Andhra Pradesh
- Vijayawada
