= Zamigolvepalle =

- Village
- Interactive map of Zamigolvepalle
- Location in Andhra Pradesh, India Zamigolvepalle (India)
- Coordinates: 16°22′4″N 80°57′42″E
- Country: India
- State: Andhra Pradesh

Area
  - Total: 4.17 km^{2} (1.61 sq mi)

Population (2011)
  - Total: 2,545
  - Density: 610/km^{2} (1,580/sq mi)

Languages
  - Official: Telugu
- Time zone: UTC+5:30 (IST)
- PIN: 521322
- Vehicle registration: AP

Zamigolvepalle is a village in Krishna district of the Indian state of Andhra Pradesh. It is located in Pamarru mandal.
