= Gudivada bus station =

Bus station in Andhra Pradesh, India

General information
- Location: Gudivada, Andhra Pradesh; India
- Coordinates: 16°25′52″N 80°59′49″E
- Owner: APSRTC
- Bus operators: APSRTC, TSRTC, KSRTC, TNSTC

Construction
- Structure type: Standard (on-ground)
- Parking: Yes

Other information
- Website: https://www.apsrtconline.in/oprs-web/
Location
- Location within Andhra Pradesh Location within India

Gudivada bus station is a bus station located in Gudivada city of the Indian state of Andhra Pradesh. It is owned and operated by Andhra Pradesh State Road Transport Corporation. It is one of the major bus stations in the state of Andhra Pradesh.

== Infrastructure ==
The station is equipped with a bus depot for the storage and maintenance of buses.

== Services ==
Gudivada bus station primarily serves Andhra Pradesh and Telangana and has daily bus services to almost every city and town in Andhra Pradesh and there are also bus services to major cities and towns which are located in Karnataka, Tamil Nadu and Telangana. Courier and logistics services by APSRTC are also available at Gudivada bus station

== Renovation ==
Currently, the bus station is undergoing expansion and related development works are under progress.
