= Mullapudi =

Mullapudi or Mullapoodi is a Telugu surname. It is more common among people of the Brahmin and Kamma castes. People with this name include:

- Mullapudi Harishchandra Prasad is one of the pioneering and prominent industrialists in Southern India
- Mullapudi Venkata Ramana is a Telugu story writer
- Mullapudi Ravichandranath Chowdary is a Telugu historian
