= Gudlavalleru =

- Village
- Interactive map of Gudlavalleru
- Location in Andhra Pradesh, India Gudlavalleru (India)
- Coordinates: 16.3500°N 81.0500°E
- Country: India
- State: Andhra Pradesh
- District: Krishna
- Mandal: Gudlavalleru

Area
  - Total: 7.75 km^{2} (2.99 sq mi)

Population (2011)
  - Total: 10,491
  - Density: 1,350/km^{2} (3,510/sq mi)

Languages
  - Official: Telugu
- Time zone: UTC+5:30 (IST)
- PIN: 521356
- Vehicle registration: AP39

Gudlavalleru is a village and mandal headquarters in Krishna district of the Indian state of Andhra Pradesh. It is located on the Gudivada – Machilipatnam route.

== Geography ==
Gudlavalleru is at 16.3500°N 81.0500°E. It has an average elevation of 1 metres (6 ft).

== Demographics ==
As of 2011 census, Gudlavalleru had a population of 10,491. The total population constitute, 5,062 males and 5,429 females —a sex ratio of 1073 females per 1000 males. 986 children are in the age group of 0–6 years, of which 758 are boys and 742 are girls. The average literacy rate stands at 79.55% with 7,561 literates, significantly higher than the district average of 73.70%.

== Notable people ==
- V S Rama Das (1933–2010) botanist

== See also ==
- Villages in Gudlavalleru mandal
