= Addada =

Addada అడ్డదా
- Village
- Interactive map of Addada
- Coordinates: 16.35813°N 80.98560°E
- Country: India
- State: Andhra Pradesh
- District: Krishna
- Talukas: Pamarru

Government
  - Body: Village Panchayat

Languages
  - Official: Telugu
- Time zone: UTC+5:30 (IST)
- Nearest city pamarru & Gudiwada: Krishna
- Civic agency: Village Panchayat

Addada (Telugu: అడ్డదా) is a village in the southern state of Andhra Pradesh, India. It is located in the Pamarru taluk of Krishna district in Andhra Pradesh.
