= Prashant Bose =

Indian Maoist politician (1943/1944–2026)

- Born: 1943 or 1944
- Died: 3 April 2026 (aged 82); Ranchi, Jharkhand, India
- Other names: Kishan, Kajal and Mahesh
- Organization: Communist Party of India
- Criminal charges: Left wing Insurgency, Murder, Criminal Conspiracy
- Criminal status: Deceased
- Spouse: Sheela Marandi

Prashant Bose (1943 or 1944 – 3 April 2026), commonly known by his nom de guerre Kishan or Kishan da was an Indian politician who was a senior Politburo member of the Communist Party of India (Maoist). He previously used the aliases Nirbhay Mukherjee, Kajal, Kishan-da and Mahesh. Kishan, the MCCI chief was No. 2 in the CPI (Maoist).

He was in charge of Bihar and Jharkhand and headed the party's Eastern Regional Bureau. Bose, a Bengali Maoist leader, was also a known intellectual of the party. He joined in Naxalite movements as a trade union activist in 1967 and continued to play a key role in left-wing politics in India.

In September 2004, Maoist Communist Centre of India and Communist Party of India (Marxist–Leninist) People's War merged to form CPI (Maoist). The agreement had been signed between Kishan, General Secretary, Central Committee of Maoist Communist Centre of India and Ganapathy, General Secretary Central Committee, CPI (M-L People's War). Bose was the prime political strategist of the party who visited Northeast India and Myanmar for alliance between various banned outfits.

== Life and career ==
Bose hailed from Jadavpur, Kolkata. His wife Sheela Marandi, another central committee member of CPI (Maoist) was imprisoned from 2006 to 2016.

Bose and his wife were arrested by Jharkhand police on 12 November 2021.

Bose was shifted to Birsa Munda Central Jail in Ranchi along with his wife.

After a prolonged illness, Bose died at the Rajendra Institute of Medical Sciences, on 3 April 2026, at the age of 82.
