= Kondapalli Seetharamaiah =

Founder of CPI (ML) People's war

- Born: 1914; Lingavaram, Andhra Pradesh, India
- Died: 12 April 2002 (aged 87–88); Vijayawada
- Known for: Prominent Figure of Naxal movement in India

Kondapalli Seetharamaiah (Telugu: కొండపల్లి సీతారామయ్య; 1914—12 April 2002) was a senior communist leader and Maoist organizer in India.

== Early life ==
Kondapalli Seetharamaiah was born into a rich Reddy family in Lingavaram village, Nandivada mandal of Gudivada revenue division, Krishna District, Andhra Pradesh, and was brought up in the nearby Jonnapadu village. Kondapalli Seetharamaiah also lived in Jannaram village, of Mancherial district for almost 20 and more years, he moved here along with one of the close associates Mulupuri Gopal Rao. His mother was murdered when they were living in Jannaram.

== Political career ==
Kondapalli Seetharamaiah, at a young age, joined the communist movements. He went on to become the Krishna District Secretary of the Communist Party of India. His CPI unit was active during the Telangana Rebellion. When the Communist Party of India was divided in 1964, Seetharamaiah withdrew from political life. He began working as a Hindi teacher at St. Gabriel's High School in Warangal. In Warangal he befriended K. G. Satyamurthy. Both men joined the Communist Party of India (Marxist-Leninist). Seetharamaiah became a member of the Andhra Pradesh State Committee of CPI(ML). When the Communist Party of India (Marxist-Leninist) was torn by internal strife, Seetharamaiah joined the Central Organising Committee, Communist Party of India (Marxist–Leninist) in 1972. In August 1974, the Andhra Pradesh State Committee of COC, CPI(ML) was organised, with Seetharamaiah as one of its three members.

On 26 April 1977, Seetharamaiah was arrested in Nagpur, when police caught him with weapons in a vehicle. He was released on bail, but absconded and went underground.

In 1977, he broke away from COC, CPI(ML). On 22 April 1980 he founded the Communist Party of India (Marxist-Leninist) People's War.

On 2 January 1982, he was arrested in Hyderabad at Begumpet Railway Station, when waiting to board a train to Bombay. On 4 January 1984 he managed to escape from the prisoners wing of the Osmania Hospital.

Following an internal dispute, which ended with the expulsion of K.G. Sathyamurthy (number 2 in the party ranks) and Byreddy Sathyanarayana Reddy (militia commander in Khammam District), Seetharamaiah's hold over the party strengthened. Sathyamurthy had begun questioning Maoist character of the party, on the lines of Deng Xiaoping. Reddy had opposed Sathyamurthy's ouster.

In 1991, Seetharamaiah was ousted from the party. In 1993, he was caught by police in his home village. After few years in prison, he was acquitted and released on humanitarian grounds.

== Final years ==
During his final years, he abstained from political activities. He suffered from Alzheimer's disease. Kondapalli Seetharamaiah died in his granddaughter's house in Vijayawada on 12 April 2002. He was 87 years old. He was survived by his wife Koteswaramma and two granddaughters, K. Anuradha and K. Sudha. Funeral services were arranged the next day. According to press reports, only a handful of people turned up.
