= Gudlavalleru mandal =

Gudlavalleru Mandal
- Mandal
- Nickname: gvl
- Interactive map of Gudlavalleru Mandal
- Location in Andhra Pradesh, India Gudlavalleru Mandal (India)
- Coordinates: 16.3487°N 81.0492°E
- Country: India
- State: Andhra Pradesh
- District: Krishna
- Mandal: Gudlavalleru

Government
  - Type: YSRCP
  - Body: VPS Lahari MLA

telugu
  - Official: Telugu
- Time zone: UTC+5:30 (IST)
- Postal code: 521 356
- Vehicle registration: AP 39

Gudlavalleru mandal is one of the 25 mandals in the Krishna district of Andhra Pradesh state in India. It falls under Gudivada revenue division.

== Villages in Gudlavalleru Mandal ==
- Angaluru
- Chandrala
- Chinagonnuru
- Chitram
- Dokeparru
- Gadepudi
- Gudlavalleru
- Kowtharam
- Kurada
- Mamidikolla
- Nagavaram
- Penjendra
- Pesaramilli
- Puritipadu
- Serikalvapudi
- seridaggumilli
- ulavalapudi
- vadlamannadu
- vemavaram
- vemavarapallem
- venuthurumilli
