= Bapulapadu =

- Village
- Interactive map of Bapulapadu
- Location in Andhra Pradesh, India Bapulapadu (India)
- Coordinates: 16°38′08″N 80°58′17″E
- Country: India
- State: Andhra Pradesh
- District: Krishna
- Mandal: Bapulapadu

Population (2011)
  - Total: 15,223

Languages
  - Official: Telugu
- Time zone: UTC+5:30 (IST)
- Vehicle registration: AP

Bapulapadu is a village in Krishna district of the Indian state of Andhra Pradesh. It is located in Bapulapadu mandal of Nuzvid revenue division. It is one of the villages in the mandal to be a part of Andhra Pradesh Capital Region. It is 25 km away from Gannavaram airport.

== See also ==
- Villages in Bapulapadu mandal
