= Gudivada =

City in Andhra Pradesh, India

- City
- Location in Andhra Pradesh, India Gudivada (Andhra Pradesh)
- Coordinates: 16.43°N 80.99°E
- Country: India
- State: Andhra Pradesh
- District: Krishna
- Mandal: Gudivada

Government
  - Type: Municipality
  - Body: Gudivada Municipality

Area
  - Total: 12.67 km^{2} (4.89 sq mi)

Population (2011)
  - Total: 118,167
  - Density: 9,327/km^{2} (24,160/sq mi)

Languages
  - Official: Telugu
- Time zone: UTC+5:30 (IST)
- PIN: 521301
- Telephone code: +91-08674
- Vehicle registration: AP 39
- Website: gudivada.cdma.ap.gov.in

Gudivada is a city in Krishna district of the Indian state of Andhra Pradesh. It is a municipality and the headquarters of Gudivada mandal in Gudivada revenue division. It is one of the cities in the state to be a part of Andhra Pradesh Capital Region. It is the twenty-seventh most populous city in Andhra Pradesh and the three-hundredth most populous city in India with a population of 118,167 according to the 2011 Census of India.

== History ==
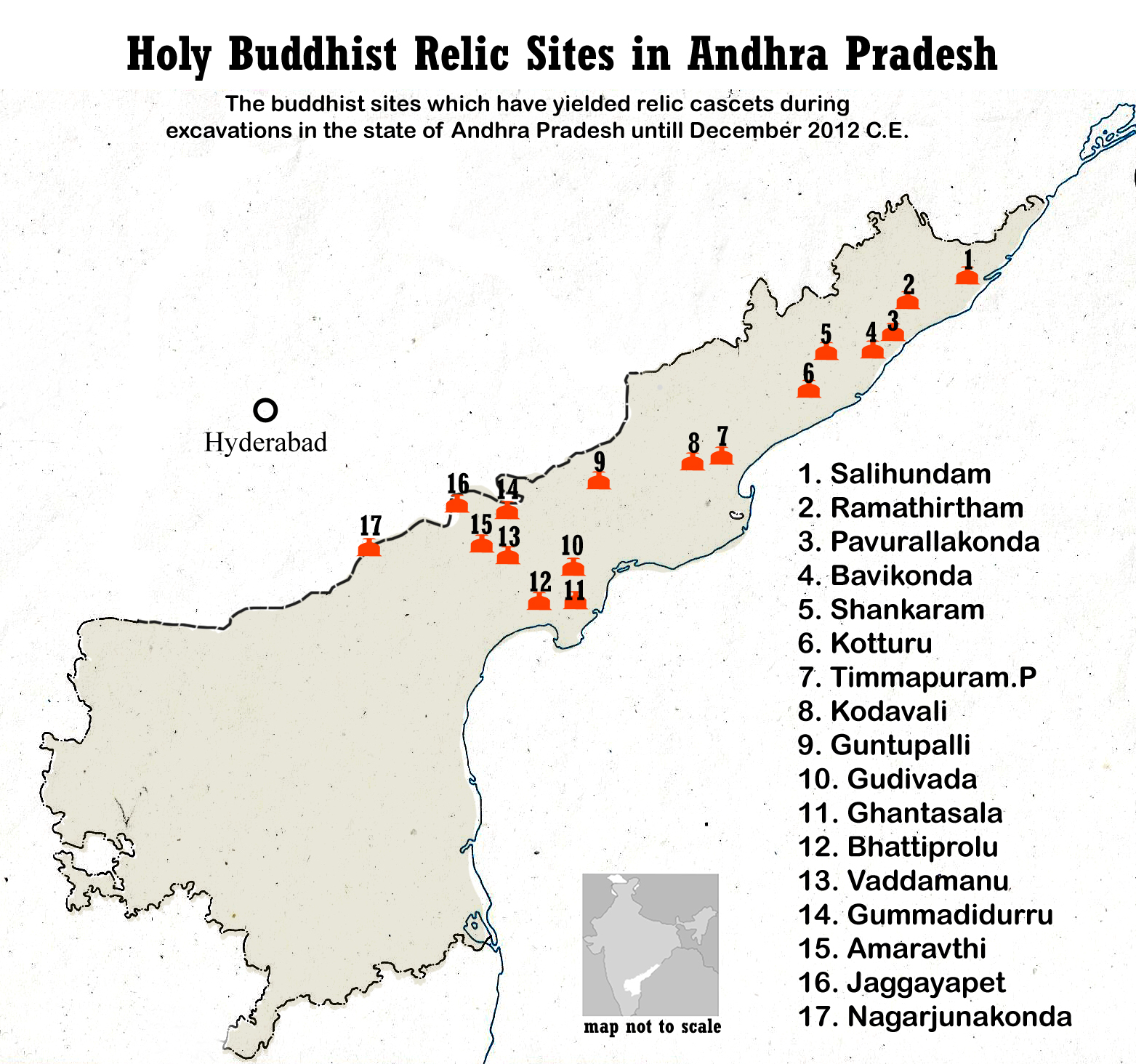
Holy relic sites map of Andhra Pradesh

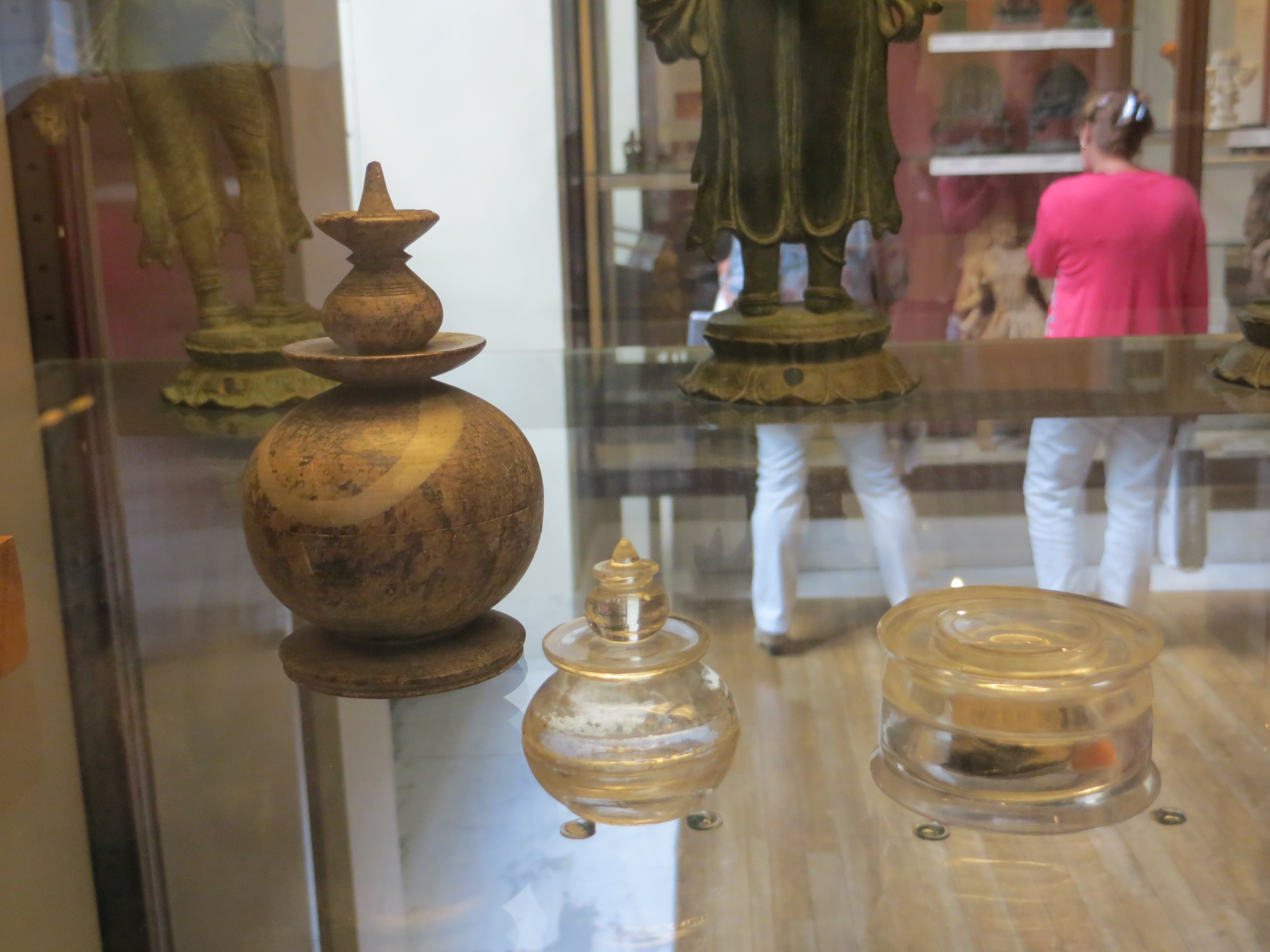
Reliquaries from the stupa at Gudiwada in the British Museum

The name Gudivada was derived from Gudi meaning Temple and Vada means Settlement or town in Telugu language. The presence of Habitation at this city may be dated back to 3rd Century BCE or 2nd Century BCE since the time of Sathavahanas as per some inscriptions. Archaeological excavations conducted at Gudivada yielded an ancient Buddhist stupa mound and Jain relics. Gudivada is religiously diversified city with many Hindu Temples and important Jain Tirth of Bhagawan Parshvanath located at market road.

Several epigraphic and scholarly sources identify ancient Gudivada with the historical place-name Siddhārthaka (also spelled Sidharthaka), particularly in Buddhist and early Andhra historical literature.

Evidence from Epigraphy and Archaeology

1. Epigraphia Indica (Archaeological Survey of India)

Multiple volumes of Epigraphia Indica—a primary ASI publication—refer to Siddhārthaka as an early settlement in the Krishna region and associate it with the area of modern Gudivada. These references appear in discussions of early Andhra inscriptions and Buddhist sites.

Epigraphia Indica, Vol. XX (ASI), in its analysis of early Andhra place-names, notes Siddhārthaka as a historical locality in the Gudivada region.

2. Annual Report of the Archaeological Survey of India (ARASI)

The ARASI reports from the early 20th century describe excavations at Gudivada revealing Buddhist remains, including stupas, brick structures, and early historic pottery. These reports identify Gudivada as an ancient Buddhist centre and mention its association with the name Siddhārthaka in early textual traditions.

ARASI 1920–1924 volumes discuss Gudivada’s Buddhist antiquities and link them to ancient place-names recorded in Pali and Sanskrit sources.

Academic and Historical Literature

3. K. Satyanarayana – A History of the Andhra Country (200 B.C.–A.D. 700) (1969)

Satyanarayana identifies Siddhārthaka as an early settlement in the Krishna district and notes that scholars equate it with modern Gudivada based on geographical and archaeological evidence.

He discusses the region’s Buddhist activity and the continuity of settlement patterns.

4. P. R. Rao – History and Culture of Andhra Pradesh (1983)

Rao mentions Siddhārthaka as one of the ancient towns in the Krishna region and notes that it is “generally identified with present-day Gudivada” based on archaeological findings and early textual references.

5. B. S. L. Hanumantha Rao – Buddhism in Andhra Pradesh (1973)

Hanumantha Rao describes Gudivada as a significant Buddhist centre and states that early Buddhist texts and regional traditions refer to the locality as Siddhārthaka.

Scholars make the identification based on:

Geographical alignment: Descriptions in early Andhra and Buddhist sources match the location of modern Gudivada.

Archaeological evidence: Excavations reveal Buddhist stupas, viharas, and early historic material culture consistent with a major ancient settlement.

Continuity of habitation: Gudivada shows continuous occupation from early historic times, supporting its identification with ancient place-names.

The strongest references come from Epigraphia Indica, ASI Annual Reports, and academic works by K. Satyanarayana, P. R. Rao, and B. S. L. Hanumantha Rao.

== Geography ==
It is located in the Coastal Andhra region of the state. Gudivada is located 41 kilometres (25.5 mi) east of the district headquarters, Machilipatnam, and 45 kilometres (27.9 mi) south of by road to Amaravati (state capital) It lies on the Eastern coastal plains. The city is located in zone 3 as per Earthquake zones of India.

== Climate ==
Gudivada falls in the hot, humid region of the country, and it is less than 35 miles from Bay of Bengal. The climate of the town is very hot in summer and is pleasant during the winter. The hottest day falls in the month of May with shift to June during some years.

== Demographics ==
As of 2011 census of India, Gudivada had a population of 118,167 with 30,834 households. The total population constitute 59,062 males, 59,105 females and 10,509 in the age group of 0–6 years. It had an average literacy rate of 81.64% with 87,887 literates, significantly higher than the district average of 73.7% and the state average of 67.41%.

== Civic administration ==
Gudivada municipality was constituted in the year 1937 as a "Third grade municipality". It was upgraded to "Special grade municipality" and is spread over an area of 12.67 km^{2} (4.89 mi^{2}) with 36 election wards. The present MLA is Venigandla Ramu whereas the present chairman of the municipality is Vacant. The present municipal commissioner is Vacant.

== Economy ==
Agri based economy is the traditional base, consisting of Rice Mills, Tractor Trailer building and other supporting industries. Gudivada is a centre for service industries for the many villages around. The service industries range from Medical, Entertainment and General stores. For the last several decades, Gudivada has transformed into a good educational hub for primary, secondary and higher schools.

== Transport ==
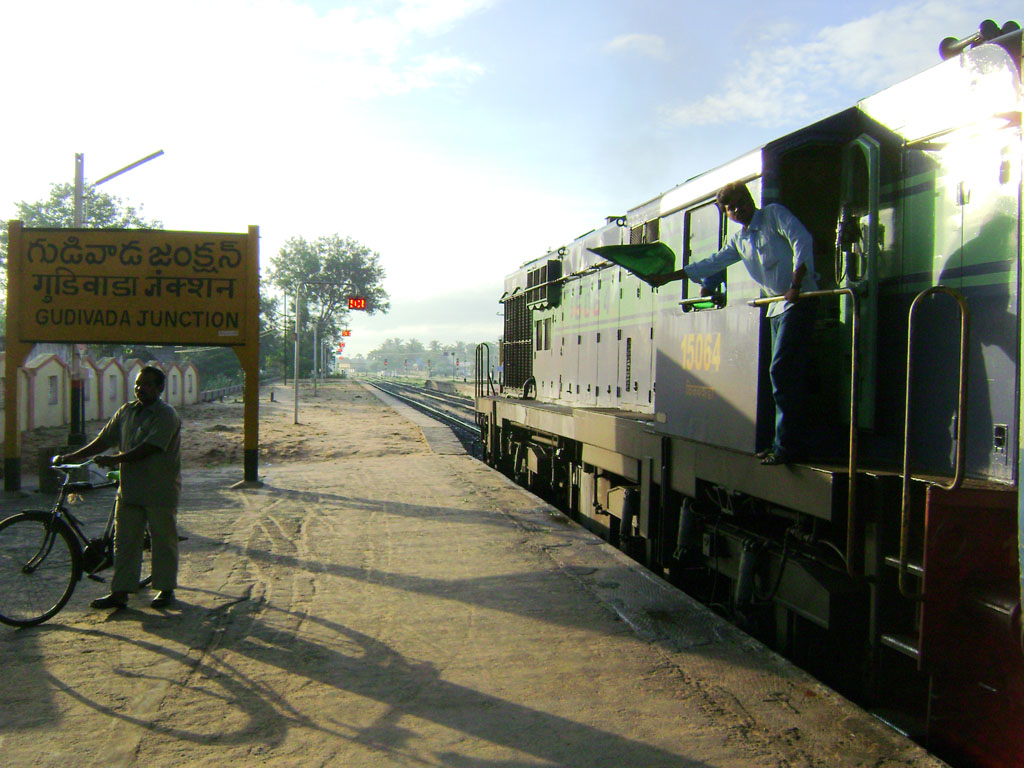
Old photo of Gudivada Junction Railway station sign board and Machilipatnam Express halted at Gudivada Junction Railway station

=== Public transport ===
The primary modes of intra-city public transport are auto rickshaws and taxis. Apart from these, other means of transport are cars, motorcycles, cycle rickshaws, and bicycles. The Gudivada bus station and Gudivada Junction railway station are the major transport infrastructure for road and rail transport.

=== Road ===
The city has a total road length of 164.00 km (101.90 mi). The national and state highways that pass through the city include, NH 165–connecting Kathipudi and Pamarru;.

=== Rail ===
Gudivada Junction railway station is the major railway junction in Krishna district and one of the fourteen B–category stations in the Vijayawada railway division of South Coast Railway zone.

=== Air ===
Gudivada which falls under Andhra Pradesh Capital Region is served by Vijayawada International airport at Gannavaram, which is 37 km away.

== Education ==
The primary and secondary school education is imparted by government, aided and private schools, under the School Education Department of the state. The medium of instruction followed by different schools are English, Telugu.

The private aided colleges are, ANR college and KT Reddy women's college. There are eleven other unaided private colleges for undergraduate and postgraduate education. One-fourth of the passed out school children will enroll for college education. There are colleges for vocational courses such as, Gudivada Vocational Junior College and St.Johns Vocational Junior College; industrial training centres include, Gudivada Industrial Training Centre, Government Industrial Training Institute for Girls. It is home for Regional Research Institute for Homeopathy.

== Sports ==
N.T.R Stadium in the city was built in partnership with Sports Authority of Andhra Pradesh, the Sports Authority of India and the Gudivada Municipality. It is the multi-purpose stadium for several sports like, athletics, volleyball, cricket, kho kho, kabaddi, badminton, tennikoit and basketball. In January 2016, the stadium hosted the National Rural Sports and Games competition, under the Rajiv Gandhi Khel Abhiyan.

== Temples ==
There are six temples under the management of Endowments Department.

1. Sri Bhimeswara Swamy Temple
2. Sri Gowri Sankara Swamy Temple
3. Sri Veeranjaneya Swamy Temple
4. Sri Venkateswara Swamy Temple
5. Sri Venugopala Swamy Temple
6. Sri Vigneswara Swamy Temple
7. Shiridi Sai Baba Temple, Pedayerukapadu
8. Sri Kanaka Durga Temple
9. Sri Kanchi Kamakshi Temple
10. Sri Sri Sri Bhagavan Venkayya Swamy Aashram

== See also ==
- List of cities in Andhra Pradesh by population
- List of municipalities in Andhra Pradesh
