= Anuradha Ghandy =

Indian communist and revolutionary

- Born: Anuradha Shanbag; 28 March 1954
- Died: 12 April 2008 (aged 54); Mumbai, India
- Other names: Narmada, Varsha, Rama, Anu, Janaki
- Education: Elphinstone College, Mumbai
- Known for: Prominent Figure of Maoist movement in India
- Spouse: Kobad Ghandy (m. 1983)

Anuradha Ghandy (28 March 1954 – 12 April 2008) was an Indian communist, Marxist feminist theorist, writer, and revolutionary leader. She was a Central Committee member of the Communist Party of India (Maoist). She was one of the founding members of the Communist Party of India (Marxist–Leninist), in Maharashtra.

Among the policy papers drafted by the Marxist movement, she contributed significantly to the ones on castes and 'Feminism and Marxism'. Her writings on feminist theory includes her 2006 book Philosophical Trends in the Feminist Movement. She made the guerillas realise the potential of worker cooperatives in areas like agricultural production, in Dandakaranya. She was also critical on shifting patriarchal ideas that were then dominant in the party.

In her obituary for Anuradha, with whom she was friends from the days when the latter was still a college student in the 1970s, Jyoti Punwani wrote: "'The Naxalite menace', says Manmohan Singh, 'is the biggest threat to the country'. But I remember a girl who was always laughing and who gave up a life rich in every way to change the lives of others".

== Early life ==
Anuradha was born to an older generation of communists, Ganesh and Kumud Shanbag, who were married in the CPI office in Mumbai. They were in the party till the mid-1950s, when it had not yet branched into the present Maoist and Marxist factions. Ganesh later got into the Defence committee, and volunteered to work in the cases filed against the communists. Kumud has been an active social worker all her life, and is at present involved with a women's group. The couple were very progressive in the way they brought up their children, who later became revolutionaries. Anuradha's brother, Sunil Shanbag, is a progressive Mumbai-based playwright, writing left-wing revolutionary plays. Anuradha attended J. B. Petit School in Santacruz. The children were exposed to varied views and ideas and were motivated to read a lot and develop their own interests such as classical dancing and theatre.

== Political career ==
In the 1970s, Elphinstone College, Mumbai was a hub of left-wing politics, of which Anuradha played a prime role. What she saw in the refugee camps in war-hit Bangladesh and also the famine-hit areas of Maharashtra prior to that were the prime motives of her commitment to social work. She was one of the leading communist figures in post-Emergency India, when the Committee for Protection of Democratic Rights was founded. Her interests in the trade unions and Dalit movements of the Vidarbha region led to her move from Mumbai to Nagpur in 1982. She was arrested a number of times around this time, after which she went underground. There were mentions of her involvement with tribals in Bastar, Chhattisgarh, as well as in Jharkhand.

== Personal life ==
In November 1983, Anuradha Shanbag married Kobad Ghandy, also a Naxalite like herself. Ghandy hails from a Gujarati-Parsi family.

== Death ==
Anuradha died of causes related to falciparum malaria on 12 April 2008. Due to her fear of government persecution including arrests or false encounters (she would be seen by the state as a ‘Maoist terrorist’) she had given the doctor she went to for a checkup a false name and dud phone number. When the doctor found that she had the parasite Plasmodium falciparum, he could not get through to her to warn her about these test results. On 11 April 2008, she was admitted to a hospital in Mumbai, but by then it was too late to save her. She died at the age of 54 on 12 April 2008. Systemic sclerosis had weakened her immune system, leading to multiple organ failure, which was, among other things, a contributing factor to her death. It was during her stint in Jharkhand, educating the tribals against oppression of women in their society, when she contracted cerebral malaria. During her final days, she had been training the women cadre to develop leadership skills.

== Bibliography ==
=== Articles ===
- 2001: "Fascism, Fundamentalism, and Patriarchy"
- 2001: "People's War has shattered the hesitations of the women of Dandakaranya"

==== Books ====
- 2006: Philosophical Trends in the Feminist Movement
- 2012: Scripting the Change: Selected Writings of Anuradha Ghandy
- 2015: The Caste Question In India
