= Azad (Maoist) =

Indian politician

Cherukuri Rajkumar Comrade
- Born: 1952; Krishna District, Andhra Pradesh, India
- Died: 1 July 2010 (aged 57–58); Sarkapalli, Adilabad District, Andhra Pradesh, India
- Cause of death: Police encounter
- Other name: Azad
- Education: Sainik School, Korukonda; Regional Engineering College, Warangal (BTech); Andhra University College of Engineering (MTech)
- Occupations: Maoist spokesperson and militant
- Organization: Communist Party of India (Maoist)
- Spouse: K. Padma
- Parents: Rajaiah Chowdary (father); Karuna (mother)
- Relatives: Cherukuri Suresh (brother); Dr. Cherukuri Anil Kumar (brother); POW Sandhya (maternal first cousin)

Cherukuri Rajkumar (1952 – 1 July 2010), known by the alias Azad, was an Indian politician who was the spokesperson and one of the seniormost members of the Central Politburo of the banned Maoist group Communist Party of India (Maoist). On 1 July 2010, he was killed by Andhra Pradesh Police in an encounter.

== Early life ==
Rajkumar was born in Krishna district of Andhra Pradesh. He is also the maternal first cousin of Progressive Organisation for Women (POW) president V Sandhya. He completed his school education from Sainik School Korukonda and graduated from Regional Engineering College, Warangal, the fountainhead of Left ideology in Andhra in the 1970s. He completed his MTech, from Andhra University College of Engineering, Visakhapatnam and became a leader of the Radical Students Union which was a breeding ground for many Naxalites.

== Naxal activities ==
Azad was arrested in 1975 and 1978 and jumped bail, carrying a bounty of Rs. 1.2 million. Rajkumar went underground for more than 30 years starting in 1979. He joined the People's War Group, on whose behalf he negotiated arms deals and training in the handling of weapons and explosives. Aside from cases of threat and intimidation, he did not have a police record in Andhra Pradesh. He was accused in the killing of Congress legislator C. Narsi Reddy along with 10 others in Mahbubnagar district on 15 August 2005.

After Maoist parties merged to form the CPI (Maoist), he mostly handled the political affairs of the party. He was an ideologue who had specialised in field-craft as well. Apart from being a Central Committee member, he was also a member of the Politburo — the highest policy-making body of the organization.

== Death ==
On 1 July 2010, Rajkumar was killed by the Andhra Pradesh Police in the Jogapur forest area near Sarkapalli in the Adilabad district of the state, near the border with Maharashtra. A few other people were also killed in the encounter, including journalist Hemchandra Pandey. Police also recovered an AK-47, a 9 mm pistol, and rucksacks with food. According to police, the encounter started at around 10:00 pm IST on 30 June 2010 and continued till 3:30 am the next day, and that 20 Maoists were involved in the exchange of fire.

Maoist sympathiser Varavara Rao filed a petition in the Andhra Pradesh High Court, rebuffing the police “encounter” narrative and advocating for the case to be treated as a murder case, which the High Court rejected. Pandey's wife Swami Agnivesh also filed a petition in the High Court, seeking an independent probe into the encounter killing.

The Supreme Court of India ordered for a Central Bureau of Investigation probe in April 2011, and CBI submitted the probe report before the Supreme Court in March 2012, terming the encounter as genuine and giving a clean chit to Andhra Pradesh police. On 16 March 2012, after going through the report, the Supreme Court concluded that the encounter was not a fake encounter. The Supreme Court observed, "'They (the CBI) have done a painstaking and thorough investigation,' the bench said. 'We have carefully gone through the sequence of events.' It said that prima facie it does not appear to be a fake encounter. 'I went through the report very carefully,' Justice Alam said. The bench agreed to the plea of advocate Prashant Bhushan that he be allowed to go through the final report of the CBI which held the incident as a genuine encounter." The Supreme Court rejected the plea for fresh investigation.

The Communist Party of Ecuador – Red Sun released a statement following the death of Azad, saying that Azad was an "example for the class struggle in the world".
