= Kobad Ghandy =

Indian politician

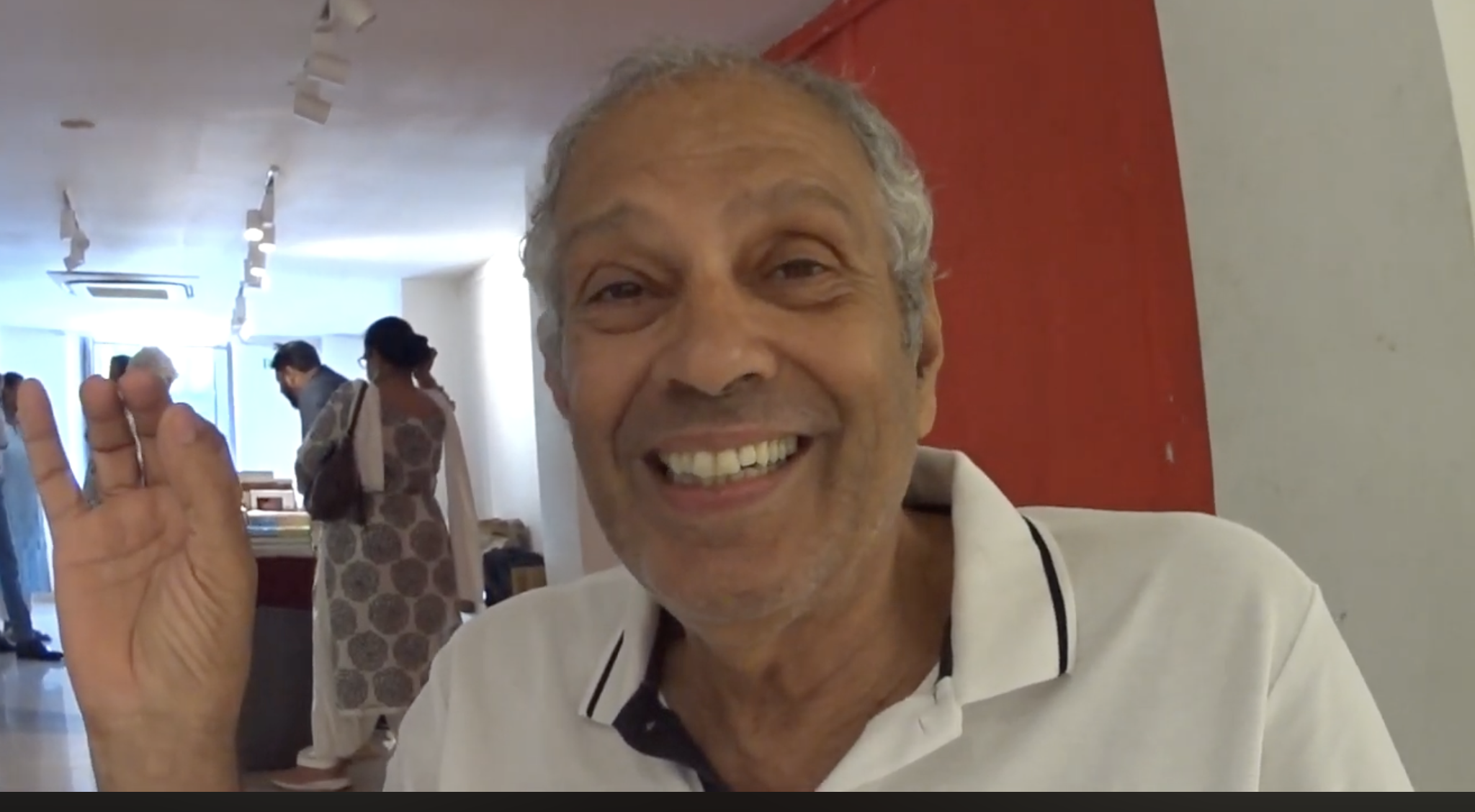
- Ghandy in 2022

Personal details
- Born: 1947 (age 78–79) Bombay, India
- Spouse: Anuradha Ghandy (m. 1983; died 2008)
- Education: The Doon School; St. Xavier's College, Mumbai; University of Cambridge

Kobad Ghandy (born 1947) is an Indian communist activist. He became involved in revolutionary politics whilst a student in England in the 1970s, and worked as an organizer for the civil rights movement in India. He was a founding member of the Committee for the Protection of Democratic Rights. He was arrested on the accusation of being a politburo member of the underground Communist Party of India (Maoist) in 2009. He was acquitted and released after almost a decade in jail in 2019. His wife was feminist theorist and fellow communist activist Anuradha Ghandy.

== Early life ==
Kobad Ghandy was born to Nergis and Adi Ghandy. Adi was a senior finance executive in Glaxo. He hails from a wealthy Parsi family in Mumbai. Ghandy attended The Doon School and later St. Xavier's College, Mumbai. He went to Cambridge University, England to pursue a course in chartered accountancy but got initiated in radical politics, was deeply influenced by the revolutionary ideology and returned to India with his course unfinished.

== Return to India ==
Upon his return to India, he became active in revolutionary politics in Maharashtra. He was the founding member of Committee for the Protection of Democratic Rights. He spent the late 1970s and early 1980s in Nagpur, working as a CPDR organizer.

== Party leader ==
Ghandy became a member of the Central Committee of the Communist Party of India (Marxist-Leninist) People's War in 1981. When the CPI(Maoist) was formed in 2004, he remained a Central Committee member of the new merged party. Ghandy reportedly participated in a 2005 meeting with the Nepalese Maoist leadership in Delhi, along with Kishenji, Prachanda and Baburam Bhattarai.

Ghandy was elevated to the Politburo of the CPI(Maoist) at the 2007 Unity Congress. He was placed in charge of the CPI(M) Central Committee sub-committee on mass organisations and was responsible for the production of English-language party materials. He was expelled from the party in December 2021 for his anti-party statement in his book Fractured Freedom: A Prison Memoir, over charges of straying from the party line of dialectical materialism, embracing spiritualism and bourgeois idealism.

== Arrest ==
He was arrested in South Delhi on the 17 September 2009 while undergoing treatment for cancer. His arrest was made public on September 21, 2009. Per a statement by CPI(Maoist) the arrest had occurred after Ghandy had been betrayed by a party courier. Ghandy had made a visit to the guerrilla zone prior to his arrest. He was released from prison on bail in 2019, after serving a majority of his jail term in Vishakapatnam Central Jail.

== Personal life ==
Kobad Ghandy married Anuradha Shanbag in 1977 She was also a Central Committee member of CPI(Maoist), and a feminist theorist. She died of cerebral malaria in April 2008 in the jungles of Dandakaranya in Central India.

== Popular culture ==
The character 'Govind Suryavanshi' in the 2012 Bollywood film Chakravyuh, portrayed by Om Puri, is said to be based upon Kobad Ghandy.

== See also ==
- Chhatradhar Mahato
- Jagdish Mahto
