= Ganapathy (Maoist) =

Leader of the Indian Maoist movement

Muppala Lakshmana Rao

1st General Secretary of the Communist Party of India (Maoist)
- In office 21 September 2004 – 10 November 2018
- Preceded by: Office established
- Succeeded by: Nambala Keshava Rao

Personal details
- Born: 16 June 1949 (age 77) Beerpur, Jagtial, Telangana, India
- Other party: People's War Group
- Occupation: Politician, former teacher

Muppala Lakshmana Rao, commonly known by his nom de guerre Ganapathy (otherwise spelt Ganapathi), is a major figure in the Indian Maoist movement and former General Secretary of the Communist Party of India (Maoist), a banned Maoist insurgent communist party in India. He resigned from the post in November 2018.

== Early life ==
Ganapathy was born in Sarangapur, Karimnagar district of Telangana. He is a science graduate and also holds a B.Ed. degree. He worked as a teacher in Karimnagar district but deserted his job to pursue higher education in Warangal.

== Early political life ==
In Warangal, Ganapathy came in touch with the Maoist cadres Nalla Adi Reddy and Kondapalli Seetharamaiah, and eventually he also decided to join the Naxalite movement in the country. He was one of the early members of Communist Party of India (Marxist-Leninist) People's War (People's War Group) and grew as General Secretary of the party that is now called as Communist Party of India (Maoist), an output of the merger of People's War Group and Maoist Communist Centre of India (MCCI) that took place in 2004. He remains active in the red belt of India including the Bastar region of Chhattisgarh.

Other than Ganapathy he is known by several other aliases viz Mupalla Lakshman Rao, Shrinivas, Rajanna, Raji Reddy, Radhakrishna, GP, Chandrasekhar, Azith and CS.

== Personal life ==
Ganapathy tends to be reclusive and difficult to meet, and has only done a few interviews. This includes an in-depth interview with Chindu Sreedharan of rediff.com in 1998, with the BBC, and with Rahul Pandita, a journalist from Open magazine and the author of "Hello Bastar" and with Shubhranshu Choudhary a former BBC journalist and writer of "Let's call him Vasu: With Maoists in Chhattisgarh".

== Role in Maoist activities ==
Ganapathy is one of the most wanted persons by the Indian security forces for his role in several Naxal activities. National Investigation Agency has announced an award of ₹ 1,500,000 for any information leading to his arrest. The total bounty on his head is the highest currently in India, which is ₹ 36,000,000. He had been replaced by his second-in-command Nambala Keshava Rao alias Basavaraj in November 2018 due to ill health. Ganapathy had been replaced in his position as Maoist general secretary and is suspected to have fled to the Philippines through Nepal.
