= Nandivada mandal =

Nandivada Mandal
- Mandal
- Interactive Map Outlining mandal
- Location in Andhra Pradesh, India
- Coordinates: 16.3354°N 81.0106°E
- Country: India
- State: Andhra Pradesh
- District: Krishna
- Headquarters: Nandivada

Government
  - Body: Mandal Parishad

Languages
  - Official: Telugu
- Time zone: UTC+5:30 (IST)
- PIN: 521 XXX
- Vehicle registration: AP 16

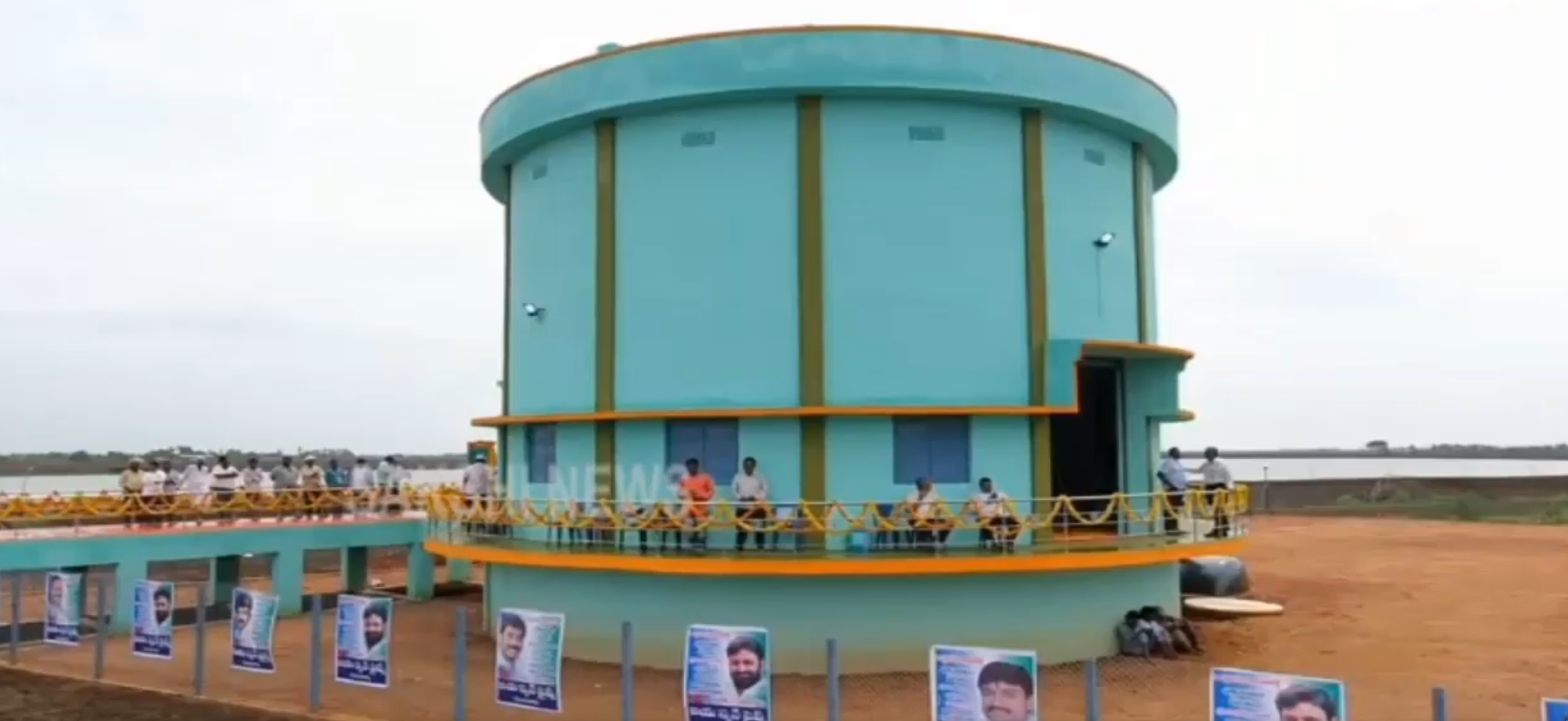
Aripirala lift irrigation project

Nandivada mandal is one of the 25 mandals in the Krishna district of the Indian state of Andhra Pradesh. The Budameru River passes through Nandivada and a lift irrigation project has been constructed near Aripirala village at a cost of rupees nine crore.
