= Pedaparupudi mandal =

Pedaparupudi Mandal
- Mandal
- Interactive Map Outlining mandal
- Location in Andhra Pradesh, India
- Coordinates: 16.4253°N 80.9564°E
- Country: India
- State: Andhra Pradesh
- District: Krishna
- Headquarters: Pedaparupudi

Government
  - Body: Mandal Parishad

Languages
  - Official: Telugu
- Time zone: UTC+5:30 (IST)
- PIN: 521 XXX
- Vehicle registration: AP 16

Pedaparupudi mandal is one of the 25 mandals in the Krishna district of the Indian state of Andhra Pradesh.
