= Pamarru, Krishna district =

Pamarru
- Village
- Interactive map of Pamarru
- Location in Andhra Pradesh, India Pamarru (India)
- Coordinates: 16.327°N 80.961°E
- Country: India
- State: Andhra Pradesh
- District: Krishna
- Mandal: Pamarru

Area
  - Total: 17.80 km^{2} (6.87 sq mi)

Population (2011)
  - Total: 21,395
  - Density: 1,202/km^{2} (3,113/sq mi)

Languages
  - Official: Telugu
- Time zone: UTC+5:30 (IST)
- PIN: 521 157
- Telephone code: +91–08674
- Vehicle registration: AP 16
- Lok Sabha constituency: Machilipatnam Lok Sabha constituency
- Vidhan Sabha constituency: Pamarru Assembly constituency

Pamarru is a village in Krishna district of the Indian state of Andhra Pradesh. It is located in Pamarru Mandal in Gudivada revenue division.

== Transport ==
APSRTC operates buses from Pamarru bus station. National Highway 65 and National Highway 165 connects with Pamarru.

== See also ==
- Villages in Pamarru mandal
