= Gudivada revenue division =

- revenue division in Krishna district
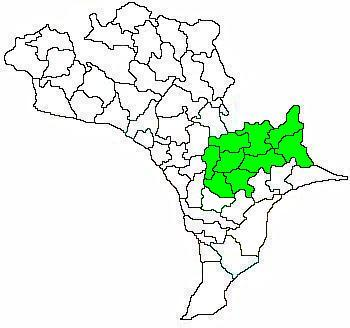
- Mandals in Gudivada revenue division (in green) of Krishna district
- Country: India
- State: Andhra Pradesh
- District: Krishna

Gudivada revenue division (or Gudivada division) is an administrative division in the Krishna district of the Indian state of Andhra Pradesh. It is one of the 3 revenue divisions in the district with 7 mandals under its administration. Gudivada serves as the headquarters of the division. The division has one municipality.

== Mandals ==
The mandals in the division are

1. Gudivada
2. Gudlavalleru
3. Nandivada
4. Pedaparupudi
5. Gannavaram
6. Bapulapadu
7. Unguturu

== Administration ==
The present Revenue Divisional Officer of Gudivada revenue division is Padmavati.

== See also ==
- List of revenue divisions in Andhra Pradesh
