= Timeline of the Naxalite–Maoist insurgency =

Conflict in India

The Naxalite–Maoist insurgency was part of a conflict between communist groups and the Indian government. The insurgency started after the 1967 Naxalbari uprising and the subsequent split of the Communist Party of India (Marxist) leading to the creation of a Marxist–Leninist faction. The faction splintered into various groups supportive of Maoist ideology, claiming to fight a rural rebellion and people's war against the government.

Extent of Areas with Naxalite activity from 2007 to 2024

The armed wing of the Maoists is called the People's Liberation Guerrilla Army. They have conducted multiple attacks on security forces and government workers. The influence zone of the Naxalites is called the red corridor, which consists of about 25 districts in Central and East India as of 2021. The insurgency reached its peak in the late 2000s with almost 180 affected districts and was on the decline since then due to counter-insurgency actions and development plans formulated by the Government. Naxalite organisations and groups were declared as terrorist organisations under the Unlawful Activities (Prevention) Act of India (1967).

== 1960s–1990s ==
- Early 1967: A faction of the Communist Party led by Charu Majumdar called the "Siliguri group" called for the initiation of armed struggle in the Naxalbari region in West Bengal and many peasant cells were created in response.
- 3 March 1967: A few peasant workers seized a plot of land from its jotedar (owner) and harvested the crops.
- 18 May 1967: The Siliguri Kishan Sabha, of which Jangal Santhal was the president, declared their support for the movement initiated by Kanu Sanyal, and their readiness to adopt armed struggle to redistribute land to the landless.
- 25 May 1967: In Naxalbari, a sharecropper of tribal background who was given land by the courts under tenancy laws was attacked by the previous landlord's men. The confrontation between police and participants in the Naxalbari peasant movement resulted in the death of police inspector. In retaliation, the police opened fire killing ten people.
- November 1967: A group led by Sushital Ray Chowdhury organised the All India Coordination Committee of Communist Revolutionaries (AICCCR).
- 22 April 1969: The foundation of Communist Party of India (Marxist–Leninist) (CPI-ML) was declared by Kanu Sanyal at a mass meeting in Kolkata.
- 1971: Satyanarayan Singh revolted against the leadership and split the CPI-ML into two, forming a separate provisional committee. Naxalites gained presence among radical sections of the student movement in Kolkata.
- 1971–72: The Government of West Bengal instituted counter-measures against the Naxalites. With the support of the Indian Government, Operation Steeplechase was launched with the aid of the paramilitary forces of the Indian Armed Forces, which resulted in the killing and imprisoning of suspected Naxalites and their cadres, including senior leaders.
- 16 July 1972: Majumdar was arrested by West Bengal Police.
- 28 July 1972: Majumdar died in police custody.
- December 1972: The CPI-ML split into further factions such as the Mahadev Mukherjee faction and CPI-ML Liberation. The original party fractured into more than 40 separate small groups.
- 4 July 1975: The Indian government banned 27 organisations which included the majority of CPI-ML factions and other similar parties.
- 22 April 1980: The People's War Group faction of the CML party was founded by Kondapalli Seetharamaiah.
- 1985: Naxalites began ambushing police forces and killed a sub-inspector of police in Warangal district, United Andhra Pradesh. In response, a special task force called the Greyhounds was formed by the Government of Andhra Pradesh.
- Late 1980s: The Naxal insurgency spread to various parts of Andhra Pradesha and Odisha. The government initiated a variety of counterinsurgency measures and rehabilitation programmes for captured Naxalites.
- 12 February 1992: Bara massacre: About 38 people belonging to the land owning Bhumihar community were killed by the group in Bara village in Gaya district, Bihar.
- 1 December 1997: Ranvir Sena, a militia acting for the Bhumihar landlords, killed 58 people, mostly Dalits, in Laxmanpur Bathe village in Arwal district, Bihar, as revenge for the Bara massacre.
- 18 March 1999: About 34 people belonging to the Bhumihar community were killed by Naxalites in Senari village in Jehanabad district, Bihar. After this several retaliatory massacres were done by Ranvir Sena against Naxals and their sympathizers leading to the decline of Naxals in Bihar.

== 2000–2023 ==
=== 2000–2004 ===
- 2000–2002: An estimated 1168 people were killed including 271 members of the security forces and 467 rebels in the fighting between the Naxalites and the government forces.
- 2 December 2000: The armed wing of the Maoists called the People's Liberation Guerrilla Army was founded.
- 10 September 2002: Rafiganj train wreck: At least 130 people were killed when the Howrah Rajdhani Express derailed on a bridge over the Dhave River in Rafiganj, Bihar due to sabotage by Naxalites.
- 1 October 2003: Naxalites attacked a convoy of then Chief Minister of Andhra Pradesh, N. Chandrababu Naidu en route to Tirumala, in which the Chief Minister was injured.
- 2003: In response, the Andhra Pradesh government embarked on a rapid modernisation of its police force and up-gradation of its technical and operational capabilities to fight the insurgents. Nearly 246 insurgents were killed during the year.
- 18 May 2004: 2004 Lahsuna massacre: Four people who had voted in recently conducted electiond were killed by Maoists at Lahsuna village in Patna district, Bihar.
- 21 September 2004: The CPI-Maoist party was founded through the merger of the People's War Group and the Maoist Communist Centre of India.

=== 2005 ===
- January: Peace talks between the Andhra Pradesh state government and the Maoists broke down after the government did not agree to the release of prisoners and redistribution of land.
- 12 February: The Maoists killed six policemen, a civilian and injured many during a mass attack on a school building in Venkatammanahalli village in Tumkur district, Karnataka.
- 17 August: The government of Andhra Pradesh outlawed the CPI-Maoist party and other affiliated organisations and arrested suspected members and sympathizers of the group.
- 13 November: Maoists attacked government facilities and detonated several bombs in Jehanabad in Bihar. They took 20 Indian paramilitary members as prisoners and executed their leader. A prison guard was killed and more than 340 prisoners were freed during the attack on the district prison.

=== 2006 ===
- 28 February: Maoists attacked anti-Maoist protesters in Erraboru village in Chhattisgarh using landmines and killed 25 people.
- 24 March: More than 500 armed rebels attacked police camps in Udayagiri in Gajapati district, Orissa and freed 40 prisoners from the jail.
- 16 July: Maoists attacked a relief camp in Dantewada district, Chhattisgarh and kidnapped several villagers after killing about 29 people.
- 17-18 October: Maoist forces blocked traffic on the Antagarh–Koylibera Road in Kanker district near Raipur in Chhattisgarh. They also detonated explosives inside four government buildings, including two schools.
- 2 December: At least 14 policemen were killed by Maoists in a landmine ambush near Bokaro, Jharkhand.

=== 2007 ===
- 4 March: Sunil Mahato, a Member of Parliament belonging to the Jharkhand Mukti Morcha, was shot dead by suspected Maoists. Jharkhand Police suspected that organised criminal groups hired by political rivals of Mahato were involved in the assassination.
- 5 March: Maoists killed Komati Prakash, a local Indian National Congress leader in Andhra Pradesh while he was inspecting a road construction project in Mahabubnagar district.
- 15 March: In an attack, 300 to 350 armed Maoists killed 54 people including 15 armed force personnel in Dantewada, Chhattisgarh state. The remaining victims were tribal youths of Salwa Judum, a counter militia organisation.
- November: Maoists were involved with local groups in protests against the establishment of Special Economic Zones. Police recovered weapons belonging to Maoists. The involvement saw more than 650 deaths during the year including 218 civilians, 234 security personnel and 195 militants.

=== 2008 ===
- 6 February: Then Andhra Pradesh Chief Minister YS Rajasekhara Reddy stated "things are more or less under control. Every now and then, they (Maoists) indulge in high profile attacks but that is just to show their token presence".
- 16 February: A group of 50 Naxals armed with bombs and firearms raided a police training school, police station and armoury in Orissa and killed 12 police personnel. Before launching the attack, the Naxals announced the public would not be harmed as their target was the police.
- 29 June: Maoist forces attacked a boat on the Balimela reservoir in Orissa carrying four anti-Naxalite police and 60 Greyhound commandos. The boat sunk resulting in the deaths of 38 troops. The bodies of were found after a two-week search and their weapons were missing.
- 16 July: A landmine killed 21 policemen in Malkangiri district, Orissa.
- 2 November: On the way back from laying the foundation stone of Jindal steel plant at Salboni, the convoy of then Chief Minister of West Bengal Buddhadeb Bhattacharya and union ministers Ram Vilas Paswan and Jitin Prasada came under a landmine attack by the Maoists. Though the ministers were unharmed, a police jeep in the convoy was hit and six policemen were grievously injured.

=== 2009 ===
- February: The Indian government announced a nationwide initiative called the Integrated Action Plan for broad coordinated operations aimed at combatting and undermining support for the Naxalites in selected states. The plan included funding for grass-roots economic development projects in the affected areas and increased special police funding for the containment and reduction of Naxalite influence.
- 13 April: Ten paramilitary troops were killed in eastern Orissa when Maoists attacked a bauxite mine in Koraput district.
- 22 May: Naxalites ambushed a police party in Gadchiroli district, Maharashtra after they ventured into the forests to investigate a roadblock, which resulted in the deaths of 16 policemen.
- 10 June: Nine policemen including a Central Reserve Police Force (CRPF) officer were killed in a Naxalite attack while on routine patrol in Saranda, West Bengal. Superintendent of police Sudhir Kumar Jha said, "As Naxalites are aware of the topography and knew that the convoy would have to return through the same spot, they had planted a powerful can-bomb and ambushed the police vehicle."
- 13 June: Naxalites launched two attacks near Bokaro, killing 10 policemen and injuring several others using landmines and bombs. Two Naxalites were also injured in the attacks.
- 16 June: Four policemen were killed and two others seriously injured when Maoists ambushed a patrol party at Beherakhand in Palamau district, Jharkhand.
- 16 June: At least 11 police officers were killed in a landmine attack followed by shooting between police and suspected Maoist rebels. 7 rebels were also killed in the gunfire in Tongapal.
- 23 June: Naxalites called for a two-day bandh against intensified paramilitary activity, and a group of motorcycle borne armed Naxalites opened fire at the Lakhisarai district court premises in Bihar and freed four prisoners. The Indian government banned the CPI-Maoist party, which was opposed by the Left Front in West Bengal arguing that "there is a requirement to bring all such outfits back into the mainstream politically."
- 12 July: Rajnandgaon ambush: At least 29 members of the police including the Superintendent of Police of Rajnandgaon district, Vinod Chaubey, were killed in an ambush attack by Maoists in Chhattisgarh.
- 15 September: Then Indian Prime Minister Manmohan Singh said Maoists had growing appeal and added that dealing with left-wing extremism requires a different strategy and approach rather than a simple law and order problem.
- 19 September: More than 50 Naxals were killed and 200 were captured after a gun battle in Dantewada between the Commando Battalion for Resolute Action and Naxals, with over 20 soldiers reported missing.
- 6 October: The body of a policeman, kidnapped a week before by Maoists in Jharkhand, was found.
- 8 October: At least 17 members of the police including a top commander were killed in an ambush attack by Maoists in Maharashtra. The fighting started after a group of Maoists attacked a police station in Gadchiroli district.
- 11 November: The Indian government launched a massive military offensive, code named Operation Green Hunt and planned to deploy nearly 50,000 soldiers over two years, with the objectives of eliminating Naxal insurgents and bringing stability to the regions.

=== 2010 ===
- 15 February: Silda camp attack: A Naxalite attack on a para-military camp in West Bengal resulted in the deaths of 24 paramilitary personnel of the Eastern Frontier Rifles.
- 18 February: Maoists shot a civilian doctor in Chakulia, Jharkhand after suspecting he was a police informer and threatened the villagers with consequences if they informed the police. At least 12 villagers were killed, another 12 injured and 25 houses were burnt down in indiscriminate firing by Maoists in Jamui district of Bihar.
- 4 April: About 11 policemen were killed and ten wounded when rebels blew up a police bus in Orissa's Koraput district.
- 6 April: Dantewada ambush: Naxalites killed 75 CRPF personnel a one state police constable in a series of attacks on security convoys in Dantewada district in Chhattisgarh. This was the biggest single day loss for the security forces in the anti Naxal operations.
- 30 April: Two lorry drivers were shot dead in Jharkhand.
- 2 May: A 16-year-old girl who fled a Maoist camp was allegedly raped by the Maoists.
- 8 May: Eight Indian paramilitary personnel were killed when Naxalites blew up a police vehicle in Chhattisgarh.
- 16 May: Six villagers were murdered by Maoists in Rajnandgaon district.
- 17 May: 2010 Dantewada bus bombing: A Naxal landmine destroyed a bus in Dantewada district, killing between 31 and 44 people and injuring 15 people including several Special Police Officers (SPOs) and civilians.
- 29 June: Naxals blew up a bus on Dantewda-Sukhma road in Chhattisgarh, killing 15 policemen and 20 civilians. At least 26 CRPF personnel were killed in Narayanpur district of Chhattisgarh.
- 8–10 July: Naxalites carried out a series of attacks, including shootings and bombings across Indian states, killing eleven people. Six Naxalites were also killed by the police in response.
- 28 May: Jnaneswari Express train derailment: At least 148 people were killed when the Jnaneshwari Express train traveling from Kolkata to Mumbai derailed in West Midnapore district of West Bengal. The police alleged Naxalites caused the derailment by removing a 46 cm (18 in) piece of track, which was denied by the Naxalites.
- 29 June: At least 26 policemen were killed in a Maoist attack in Chhattisgarh.
- 26 August: Karnataka was removed from the list of Naxal-affected states.
- 29 August: A joint team of Border Security Force (BSF) and district police was attacked by the rebels in Bhuski village in Chhattisgarh. Five security personnel including three BSF personnel were killed in the ambush.
- 29-30 August: Naxalites ambushed a joint paramilitary and police team in Bihar and killed ten people. Four personnel were taken as prisoners and more than 35 automatic rifles were robbed from the state forces. Naxalites later freed three of the policemen after their family members met with Naxal leader Kishenji.
- 12 September: Naxalites killed three policemen and took four more hostage in an ambush in Chhattisgarh. The four policemen were later released after appeals by their family members and promise to leave the police force.
- 28 September: The Times of India released a poll stating that 58% of people surveyed in Andhra Pradesh had a positive perception about Naxalism, and only 19% were against it.
- 5 October: Naxalites killed four police officers in a market in Maharashtra.
- 7 October: An attempt to derail the Triveni express train from Singrauli to Bareilly, by sabotaging the tracks, was foiled.
- 8 October: Naxalites triggered a landmine in the border area between Chhattisgarh and Maharashtra. The attack killed three Indo-Tibetan Border Police soldiers, wounded two more and destroyed a military jeep.

=== 2011 ===
- 2 January: The Government of Madhya Pradesh claimed the Naxal insurgency has reduced in the state and attributed its success to rural development schemes.
- 24 May: Naxalites killed ten policemen including a senior officer in Gariaband, Chhattisgarh.
- June: Nearly 43 police personnel were killed in various attacks by Naxalites.
- 5 July: The of India Government announced the number of Naxal-affected areas had reduced to 83 districts across nine states.
- 21 July: Naxalites blew up a bridge in Chhattisgarh, killing four people and wounding five others. The attack happened when the Congress party chief of the state Nand Kumar Patel was returning from a party function.
- 24 November: Maoist leader Kishenji was killed by CRPF in an encounter, alongside six other Naxals.

=== 2012 ===
- March–April: Naxalites kidnapped two Italian citizens and a Member of the Legislative Assembly Jhin Hikkain in Odisha with a demand to release the prisoners lodged in jails. They were released in stages over the next month after negotiations between the government and the kidnappers.
- 27 March: An explosion killed 15 Indian policemen in Maharashtra.
- 10 June: A CRPF trooper was killed in a blast by Maoists in a forested area in Gaya.
- 29 June: About 18 suspected Naxalites were killed in an encounter, and seven more were arrested in Chhattisgarh. Six CRPF soldiers were injured in the clashes.
- 1 July: In Visakhapatnam, 36 Maoists were arrested including Lambayya, who had a ₹30,000 (US$320) bounty on his head.
- 18 October: Six CRPF men were killed and eight personnel, including a deputy commandant, were injured in landmine blasts and subsequent gunbattle between police and Naxalites near Barha village in Gaya district, Bihar.

=== 2013 ===
- 25 May: 2013 Naxal attack in Darbha valley: A Naxal attack in Chhattisgarh resulted in the deaths of 24 Indian National Congress leaders including former state minister Mahendra Karma and Chhattisgarh Congress chief Nand Kumar Patel.
- 2 June: At least five policemen including the Superintendent of Police were killed in an attack near Pakur in Jharkhand.
- 3 December: Seven policemen were killed in Aurangabad district, Bihar when their vehicle was blown up in a landmine blast.

=== 2014 ===
- 28 February: Six police personnel were killed in a Maoist attack in Chhattisgarh.
- 11 March: 2014 Chhattisgarh attack: 16 people, including 11 CRPF personnel, four policemen and a civilian were killed in an ambush in a forested area of Gheeram Ghati in Sukma district, Chhattisgarh.
- 14 April: Four CRPF personnel were killed in an ambush near Kirandul in Dantewada, Chhattisgarh.
- 11 May: Seven police personnel were killed in a landmine blast in the forests of Gadchiroli district, Maharashtra.
- 1 December 2014: About 14 CRPF personnel were killed and 12 were injured in Sukma district in Chhattisgarh.

=== 2015 ===
- 11 April: Seven special task force personnel were killed in a Maoist ambush near Kankerlanka in Sukma district, Chhattisgarh.
- 12 April: AF personnel was killed in a Maoist attack near Bande in Kanker, Chhattisgarh.
- 13 April: Five police personnel were killed in a Maoist attack near Kirandul in Dantewada, Chhattisgarh.

=== 2016 ===
- 21 May: Three Naxals were gunned down in an encounter with security forces in Chhattisgarh's Bastar region in May.
- 13 June: Madkam Hidme, an Adivasi woman from Sukma district, was found dead with multiple injuries. The police claimed she was a Naxal, who was wanted in various killings and had a ₹0.1 million (US$1,100) bounty on her head and said she was killed in a police encounter. Her family members and tribal activists claimed Hidme was dragged out of her home by men dressed in police uniforms, which was refuted by the police.
- 24 October: About 24 Naxalites were killed by Andhra Pradesh Greyhounds forces in an encounter near Chitrakonda on the Andhra-Odisha border.
- 24 November: Three Naxalites including Kappu Devaraj were killed near Karulai in an encounter with Kerala Police. In Jharkhand, six Naxalites were killed in a gun battle with the CRPF. Various arms and ammunition including 600 bullets of various calibres, 12 IEDs, an INSAS rifle, an SLR, a carbine and three other guns were recovered.
- 6 December: A CRPF trooper was killed and another wounded as Maoists set off Improvised Explosive Device blasts and fired in three separate places in Chhattisgarh's Bastar district.

=== 2017 ===
- 10 January: At least four Naxalites, including a woman, and a police officer were killed in a gun battle between rebels and security forces in Narayanpur district.
- 18 January: At least two women and a minor girl were killed while four others were injured by a landmine blast in Narayanpur district suspected to have been laid by Naxalites.
- 23 January: Naxalites set fire to least 15 vehicles and machines engaged in road construction in Chhattisgarh's Bijapur district.
- 1 February: At least eight policemen were killed in a land mine blast suspected to have been carried out by Naxalites in Koraput region, Odisha.
- 8 March: Four Naxalites including a zonal commander were killed in a gunbattle with security forces in Banskatwa forest area in Bihar's Gaya district.
- 11 March: Suspected Naxalites killed 11 paramilitary personnel and injured three police officers in Chhattisgarh after ambushing their convoy.
- 22 March: Six suspected Maoists were killed in a gunfight with security forces in Dantewada district of Chhattisgarh.
- 24 April: 2017 Sukma attack: Naxalites ambushed a group of CRPF officers who were guarding road workers in Sukma district of Chhattisgarh. At least 25 soldiers were killed and seven others were critically injured in the attack.
- 26 April: An exchange of fire took place between the police and Naxals in Chhattisgarh's Gariaband district.

=== 2018 ===
- 2 January: A CRPF personnel was killed after being shot in the head during an exchange of fire with Naxalites at Chakarbandha on the border of Gaya and Aurangabad districts in Bihar.
- 6 January: Naxalites gunned down the village sarpanch of Chindugarh village near Koleng in Bastar district, Chhattisgarh.
- 20 January: A policeman was injured after Naxalites triggered an IED near a market in Chhattisgarh's Dantewada district.
- 24 January: Four police personnel, including two sub-inspectors, were killed and seven others injured in a gunfight with Naxals in Chhattisgarh's Narayanpur district.
- 11 February: A reserve guard was killed when a pressure bomb planted by Naxalites went off in Chhattisgarh's Bijapur district.
- 18 February: Two personnel of Chhattisgarh Police and a civilian were killed and six others injured in a gunfight with Naxalites at Bhejji in Sukma district, Chhattisgarh. The security forces killed one Naxalite in another incident at Errabore.
- 25 February: Two Chhattisgarh Armed Force personnel, including an assistant platoon commander, were injured in a blast carried out by Naxalites in Chhattisgarh's Bijapur district.
- 26 February: Three security personnel were injured in an encounter with Naxalites in Chhattisgarh's Dantewada district.
- 1 March: An encounter between Naxalites and the police resulted in the deaths of 12 Naxalites including the Telangana Naxalite secretary, and one Greyhounds constable in Chhattisgarh's Bijapur district.
- 6 March: An encounter with Naxalites in Chhattisgarh's Kanker district resulted in the deaths of two BSF personnel.
- 6 March: Naxalites shot dead a former police officer and burned three buses in Chhattisgarh's Bastar district.
- 13 March: 2018 Sukma attack: A Naxalite IED blast killed nine CRPF soldiers in Chhattisgarh's Sukma district.
- 26 March: Odisha police killed four Naxalites in a shootout in Odisha's Koraput district.
- 26 March: A Naxalite IED explosion injured a CRPF officer in Chhattisgarh's Sukma district.
- 3 April: A shootout between Naxalites and the police resulted in the deaths of three Naxalites in Maharashtra's Gadchiroli district.
- 9 April: A bomb allegedly planted by Naxalites exploded, killing two policemen and injuring five civilians in Chhattisgarh's Bijapur district.
- 22-24 April: About 37 Naxalites were killed in a three-day fight with the police in Maharashtra's Gadchiroli district.
- 27 April: Seven Naxalites were killed in Chhattisgarh's Bijapur district by security forces.
- 6 May: Naxalites opened fire on security personnel in Chhattisgarh's Rajnandgaon district, resulting in the death of a police constable and injuring a civilian.
- 13 May: An encounter between Naxalites and the police resulted in the death of two Naxalites in Odisha's Bolangir district.
- 20 May: Six policemen were killed by a roadside bomb planted by Naxalites in Chhattisgarh's Dantewada district.
- 26 May: Naxalites killed two people in Bihar's Buxar district on suspicion of being police informers.
- 23 September: Naxalites killed Telugu Desam Party Member of Andhra Pradesh Legislative Assembly Kidari Sarveswara Rao and former member Siveri Soma in Araku Valley.

=== 2019 ===
- 8 March: A Naxal was killed in an encounter with the Kerala Police at Wayanad.
- 1 May: Gadchiroli Naxal bombing: About 16 policemen were killed in a bombing carried out by the Naxalites in Gadchiroli, Maharashtra.
- 14 June: Naxalites killed five police personnel in a weekly market in Saraikela Kharsawan district, Jharkhand.
- 28 October: Kerala Police's Thunderbolts team gunned down three Maoists in an encounter in the Attappadi hills region of Palakkad. Another member was killed a day later when the police team went to inspect the encounter site.
- 23 November: Naxals opened fire on a patrol van killing a police personnel and three home guards in Latehar, Jharkhand.

=== 2020 ===
- 8 February: Two CRPF personnel were killed in a Naxalite attack in Bijapur district, Chhattisgarh.
- 21 March: About 17 security personnel including 12 reserve guards and five special task force of the Chhattisgarh Police were killed in an ambush in Sukma district's Elmaguda forest during a security operation against Naxalites. The Naxalites further wounded 15 personnel and robbed them of their weapons.
- 19 August: In Chhattisgarh, ten villagers including a 12-year-old girl were assaulted by Naxalites, with medical reports indicating bruises on their backs and thighs.
- 28 November: A security force personnel was killed and nine were injured in an IED attack by Naxalites in Sukma, Chhattisgarh.
- 13 December: Two Maoists including one woman cadre were killed in Swabhiman Anchal area in Malkangiri, Odisha.

=== 2021 ===
- 3 April: 2021 Sukma–Bijapur attack: About 22 security force personnel including 14 policemen and seven CRPF personnel were killed in an ambush along the border of Bijapur and Sukma districts in southern Chhattisgarh. One CRPF personnel was taken captive by the Naxalites.
- 23 March: Five people were killed and 13 others injured when a bus carrying over 20 security personnel was attacked by Naxalites using an IED in Narayanpur district, Chhattisgarh.
- 13 November: About 26 Naxalites were killed in an encounter with the Maharashtra Police at Mardintola forest near Korchi in Gadchiroli district. Milind Teltumbde, a member of the CPI (Maoist) central committee, was amongst the dead.

=== 2022 ===
- 4 January: Maoists attacked Gurucharan Nayak, former Bharatiya Janata Party (BJP) MLA of Manoharpur, in West Singhbhum district of Jharkhand. Nayak escaped unhurt but two of his bodyguards were killed and their AK-47 rifles were looted.
- 2 September: Two Maoists were killed in an encounter by security forces in Saraikela Kharsawan district of Jharkhand.
- 26 November: Four Naxalites including two women were killed by security personnel in Bastar division of Bijapur district, Chhattisgarh. Weapons such as rifles and explosives were also seized.

=== 2023 ===
- 5 February: Three armed Maoists killed BJP leader Neelkanth Kakkem in Chhattisgarh.
- 11 February: In a second attack within a week in the state of Chhattisgarh, Deputy Chief of BJP of Narayanpur district was shot dead outside his home by two assailants suspected to be Maoists.
- 29 March: Two police informants were killed by Naxal rebels in Sukma District, Chhattisgarh.
- 3 April: Five Maoists were killed in Chatra, Jharkhand. Maoists called for a bandh in Bihar and Jharkhand on 14 and 15 April as a protest against the killing of their members.
- 26 April: 2023 Dantewada bombing: Ten members of the reserve guard and a driver were killed in an IED blast near Aranpur in Dantewada district, Chhattisgarh.
- 24 July: Two Naxalites surrendered to the police in Maharashtra.
- 29 July: A firefight erupted in Suka district between security personnel and Naxalites, however no casualties were reported.
- 4 August: Two Maoists surrendered to the police in Sukma region, Chhattisgarh.
- 22 October: Two Maoists were killed in clashes with police forces in Kanker district of Chhattisgarh.
- 8 November: Two Naxalites were captured and their weapons were seized after a firefight with the Kerala police special force in Wayanad district, Kerala.
- 13 November: A firefight ensued between the Thunderbolt special forces and Maoists in Kannur district, Kerala. Police reports suggested two rebels were injured in the attack and after a month, Maoists confirmed a female member of their group died due to injuries sustained in the incident.
- 14 December: Maharashtra Police killed two Maoists including Durgesh Watti, who played a major role in planning the Gadchiroli blast that killed 15 police personnel in 2019.
- 24 December: Three Maoists were killed in a firefight with the Chhattisgarh Police near Dabbakunna village in Chhattisgarh's Dantewada district.

== 2024 ==
- 10 January: A Maoist cadre, who had a ₹0.1 million (US$1,100) bounty on her head, surrendered to the authorities in Odisha.
- 13 January: A Maoist was killed by security forces in Bijapur, Chhattisgarh.
- 20 January: Three Maoists including two women cadres, were killed in an encounter by the police in Bastar, Chhattisgarh.
- 29 January: A Maoist who was arrested for his involvement in an IED blast that killed 11 security personnel last year, died due to bad health hours after arrest.
- 30 January: Three CRPF personnel, including two commandos of its elite jungle warfare unit were killed, and 14 others were injured in a Naxalite attack in Tekulagudem village on the border of Sukma and Bijapur districts in Chhattisgarh. The police reported six Maoists were killed while the Maoists stated two members of their group were killed in the encounter.
- 1 February: A Maoist couple surrendered to the police in Mulugu district, Telangana. According to the police, both had a bounty of ₹0.2 million (US$2,100) on their heads.
- 3 February: Two Maoists were killed in an encounter with the police in Narayanpur district, Chhattisgarh. On the same day, a Maoist was shot dead and another was injured by security forces in Kandhamal district, Odisha.
- 6 February: Two female Maoist cadres surrendered to the Odisha Police in Boudh district.
- 7 February: Two security personnel were killed in a firefight with Maoists in Bairio forest between Sadar and Basisthnagar Jori police station areas in Jharkhand.
- 8 February: A Maoist with an ₹0.8 million (US$8,500) bounty on his head, was killed in an encounter on the Sukma-Dantewada border in Chhattisgarh's Bastar district.
- 12 February: A Maoist zonal commander carrying a bounty of ₹1 million (US$11,000) surrendered before the police in Jharkhand's Latehar district.
- 18 February: A Chhattisgarh police officer was killed by Maoists in Bijapur district of Bastar.
- 19 February: A Maoist carrying a ₹0.5 million (US$5,300) bounty was arrested in Kannur district, Kerala after being on the run for almost two decades.
- 20 February: Two Maoists surrendered to the police in Vishakapatnam, Andhra Pradesh.
- 23 February: Two Maoists, including a zonal commander affiliated with the Jharkhand Jan Mukti Parishad, a splinter group of CPI (Maoist), surrendered to security forces in Latehar district, Jharkhand.
- 25 February: Three Naxalites were killed in an encounter with security personnel in Chhattisgarh's Kanker district. The families of the killed claimed the encounter was fake and they were not Naxalites, but the police asserted they were Naxalites. On the same day, a Maoist with a ₹0.6 million (US$6,400) bounty on her head was arrested by police from a forest along the Maharashtra-Chhattisgarh border.
- 26 February: A Chhattisgarh police personnel was killed in an IED blast in Bijapur district.
- 27 February: Four Maoists were killed in a clash with security forces in Bijapur district, Chhattisgarh.
- 1 March: A local BJP Leader was attacked and killed by Maoists in Chhattisgarh's Bijapur.
- 2 March: A Maoist member surrendered to the Bhadradri Kothagudem district police, and in another incident, the police arrested a militia deputy commander in Telangana.
- 3 March: A Maoist local commander and a security personnel were killed in an encounter in Hidur Forest area in Kanker District, Chhattisgarh.
- 7 March: A BJP worker was killed by Maoists in Bastar, Chhattisgarh.
- 10 March: A Maoist belonging to the banned Tritiya Sammelan Prastuti Committee was killed while several others were injured and three of them arrested during a gunfight with security forces at Ureej forest in Hazaribagh district, Jharkhand.
- 11 March: A Maoist was killed and a security personnel was injured in an encounter in Bijapur, Chhattisgarh.
- 15 March: Two Maoists were killed in a clash with security forces in Bijapur, Chhattisgarh.
- 19 March: Four Maoists including two high-ranking members were killed in a clash with the special forces of Maharashtra police. Police said the Maoists were trying to cross from Telangana to Maharashtra for a possible attack during the 2024 Indian general elections. On the same day, two Maoists including a women were killed in an encounter with security forces in Dantewada district, Chhattisgarh.
- 26 March: Three villagers of Besugada village were killed by Maoists in Chhattisgarh's Bijapur district.
- 27 March: Six Maoists including two women were killed in a firefight with security personnel in the forests of Chikurbhatti and Pusbaka villages in Basaguda area, Bastar.
- 1 April: Two Maoists including a senior leader were killed in encounter with the police in Balaghat district of Madhya Pradesh.
- 2 April: About 13 Maoists were killed in a gunfight with the security forces in a forest near Lendra village in Bijapur district, Chhattisgarh.
- 6 April: Three Maoists were killed in an encounter with police in Chhattisgarh.
- 7 April: A Maoist, who was injured in an elephant attack, surrendered to the police in Kannur district, Kerala.
- 16 April: 2024 Kanker clash: About 29 Maoists were killed and three security personnel were injured in an encounter in Chhattisgarh's Kanker district.
- 21 April: A Maoist was shot dead by security forces in an encounter in Chhattisgarh's Bijapur district.
- 22 April: Six Maoists including three women surrendered to the police in Visakhapatnam.
- 25 April: Two Maoists were killed in an encounter with security forces in Parhel reserve forest area of Boudh district, Odisha.
- 26 April: About 18 Moists including three women surrendered to the CRPF in Dantewada, Chhattisgarh.
- 30 April: About 10 Maoists were killed and weapons were seized in a clash with the police in Chhattisgarh's Narayanpur district.
- 11 May: In a major encounter between Maoists and security forces, about 12 Maoists were killed and 2 security personnel injured in Bijapur district, Chhattisgarh.
- 13 May: Around 14 Maoists with a cumulative bounty of more than ₹4.1 million (US$44,000) were arrested by police in Bijapur district, Chhattisgarh. On the same day, three Maoists including two women were killed in an encounter with security forces in Gadchiroli district, Maharashtra.
- 14 May: About 30 Maoists surrendered to security forces in Bijapur district, Chhattisgarh. Later they stated they were disappointed in the hollow ideology of the Maoists and the constant mistreatment by their commanders as the reason for their surrender.
- 18 May: A Maoist with a ₹0.11 million (US$1,200) bounty was shot dead by security forces in Sukma district, Chhattisgarh.
- 20 May: A security personnel was injured in an encounter with Maoists in Odisha's Nuapada district.
- 21 May: Ten Maoists were arrested in a security operation in Sukma district, Chhattisgarh.
- 23 May: Seven Maoists were killed and their weapons seized in an operation in the border of Narayanpur-Bijapur districts in Chhattisgarh. On the same day, a Maoist commander was killed in a joint operation by the Jharkhand Police and CRPF in Saranda forest, Jharkhand.
- 24 May: A female Maoist was killed in an encounter in Dantewada district, Chhattisgarh.
- 25 May: A Maoist was shot dead by security forces in an encounter in Belpchcha village in Sukma district, and two Maoists were killed in Jammemarka and Kamkanaar villages in Bijapur district in Chhattisgarh.
- 26 May: Around 33 Maoists with a cumulative bounty of ₹0.5 million (US$5,300) surrendered to security forces in Bijapur district, Chhattisgarh. The surrendered cadres stated they were disappointed in the hollow ideology of the Maoists and wanted to return to normal life.
- 29 May: Two Maoists were killed in an encounter by security forces in Bijapur district, Chhattisgarh.
- 7 June: Six Maoists belonging to the PLGA, with a cumulative bounty of ₹3.8 million (US$41,000), were killed in an encounter with security personnel in Narayanpur district, Chhattisgarh. Three security personnel were injured in the incident.
- 15 June: Eight Maoists and one security personnel were killed in a clash between Maoists and security forces in Abhujmarh forest, Chhattisgarh.
- 17 June: Five Maoists including a zonal commander were killed and two others arrested during an operation by the CRPF in Saranda forest in West Singhbhum district, Jharkhand.
- 23 June: Two security personnel were killed in an IED blast in Sukma district, Chhattisgarh.
- 29 June: About 12 Maoists including two women surrendered to the CRPF in Bijapur district, Chhattisgarh. The surrendered cadres reported they were disappointed in the ideologies of Maoism and wanted to return to normal life.
- 30 June: Four Maoists were arrested by police in Palamu district, Jharkhand.
- 1 July: Nine Maoists including four cadres who were involved in the 23 June attack that killed two security force personnel were arrested by police in Sukma district, Chhattisgarh.
- 2 July: Five Maoists with a cumulative bounty of ₹4 million (US$43,000) were killed and three others arrested in an encounter with security forces, and their weapons were recovered in Narayanpur district, Chhattisgarh.
- 5 July: A Maoist commander who was involved in the deaths of more than 86 CRPF personnel and four civilians was arrested by the police in Andhra Pradesh.
- 6 July: Five Maoists surrendered to the CRPF in Sukma district, Chhattisgarh.
- 8 July: A Maoist carrying a ₹1.4 million (US$15,000) bounty was killed in an operation by security forces in Balaghat district of Madhya Pradesh.
- 9 July: A women Maoist was killed in an encounter by security forces in Kanker district, Chhattisgarh.
- 17 July: About 12 Maoists were killed and seven automatic weapons seized in an encounter with Gadchiroli Police along the Maharashtra–Chhattisgarh border.
- 18 July: Two security personnel were killed and four injured in an IED blast in Bijapur district, Chhattisgarh.
- 20 July: A Maoist was killed in a gunfight with security forces in Sukma district, Chhattisgarh.
- 26 July: A Maoist was killed in an encounter with the security forces in Damarathogu-Alligudem forest area, Telangana.
- 29 July: Two Naxalite were arrested in Shoranur and Kochi in Kerala.
- 2 August: A senior Maoist leader was arrested in Kerala.
- 10 August: A Maoist was killed by the security forces in Dantewada district, Chhattisgarh.
- 21 August: A female Maoist was killed by her own cadre after she was accused of collaborating with the police.
- 26 August: About 25 Maoists with a cumulative bounty of ₹2.8 million (US$30,000), surrendered to the security forces in Bijapur district, Chhattisgarh.
- 29 August: Three women Maoists were killed in an encounter with the security forces in Narayanpur district, Chhattisgarh.
- 3 September: Nine Maoists were killed including Macherla Esobu, who had a bounty of ₹2.5 million (US$27,000) and weapons including multiple rifles were seized in Dantewada district, Chhattisgarh.
- 5 September: Six Maoists were killed and two security personnel were injured and weapons were seized in Karakagudem forest area in Bhadradri-Kothagudem district, Telangana.
- 14 September: A Maoist was killed in a gunfight with the security forces in Sukma district, Chhattisgarh.
- 24 September: Three Maoists including a woman were killed in an encounter in Narayanpur district, Chhattisgarh. The deceased Maoists included had a combined bounty of more than ₹4 million (US$43,000) on their heads.
- 4 October: 2024 Abujhmarh clash: 38 Maoists were killed and weapons were captured in the Abujhmarh forest area on the Narayanpur-Dantewada border in Chhattisgarh.
- 8 October: A maoist was killed in an encounter with the security forces in Sukma district, Chhattisgarh.
- 19 October: Two Indo-Tibetan Border Police (ITBP) personnel were killed in an IED blast triggered by the Maoists in Narayanpur district, Chhattisgarh.
- 21 October: Five Maoists were killed in a firefight with security forces in Gadchiroli forest area near the Maharashtra–Chhattisgarh border.
- 25 October: A Maoist was killed by the security forces in Kandhamal district, Odisha.
- 9 November: Three Maoists were killed and weapons were seized following an encounter with the security forces in Bijapur district, Chhattisgarh.
- 16 November: Five Maoists were killed and two security personnel injured in an encounter in Abujhmad forest on the borders of Kanker and Narayanpur districts, Chhattisgarh.
- 19 November: Senior Maoist commander Vikram Gowda was killed in an operation in Hebri Kabvinale in Udupi district, Karnataka.
- 21 November: A Maoist was killed and a soldier injured in exchange of fire in Jinelguda forest bordering Chhattisgarh and Odisha.
- 21 November: Two civilians were killed by Maoists on the Suspicion of being police informers in Mulug district, Telangana.
- 22 November: 10 Maoists were killed and weapons seized in an encounter by security forces in Sukma district, Chhattisgarh.
- 27 November: A maoist who was the zonal commander of Palamu division with a bounty of ₹15 lakhs was killed in an internal feud with other cadres in Latehar district, Jharkhand.
- 1 December: Seven Maoists including the State committee secretary of Telangana were killed in an encounter with Security forces in Mulugu district, Telangana.
- 9 December: Two PLFI group members, which is a splinter group of CPI Maoists, was killed by villagers as a revenge for killing three young villagers in previous months.
- 12 December: Seven Maoists were killed in an encounter with security forces in the Abujhmaad forest area, Chhattisgarh.
- 13 December: Two Maoists were killed in an encounter by Security forces in Bijapur district, Chhattisgarh.

== 2025 ==
- 3 January: A Maoist was killed in an encounter in Gariaband district, Chhattisgarh.
- 5 January: Five Maoists and one Security personnel were killed in a gunfight in the forest along the border of Narayanpur and Dantewada districts.
- 6 January: 2025 Bijapur Naxal attack:
  8 District Reserve Guard personnel and a civilian driver were killed in an IED blast targeting their vehicle planted by Maoists in Bijapur district, Chhattisgarh.
- 8 January: Six Maoists surrendered to the Chief Minister of Karnataka, with this only one maoist is active in the whole state of Karnataka and process of contacting him to surrender is ongoing. The Chief Minister has also declared Karntaka as "Naxal free".
- 9 January: Three Maoists were killed in an encounter with Security forces in Sukma district, Chhattisgarh.
- 12 January: Five Maoists were killed in a gunfight with Security forces in the Indravati National Park area in Bijapur district, Chhattisgarh.
- 16 January: In a Joint operation conducted by various security forces killed 18 Maoists in Bijapur district, Chhattisgarh. The Maoists were part of the Battalion No.1, which is considered as group containing Senior and hardcore cadre of the PLGA, the dead also included Bade Chokka Rao, also known as Damodar who was the head of Telangana state committee of the PLGA and had a bounty of ₹50 lakhs. Top Maoists like Deva (Head of the No.1 battalion) and Madvi Hidma (Head of the central committee) were also present in the gunfight but managed to escape.
- 21 January: In an Operation by Security forces in Chhattisgarh–Odisha border killed 14 Maoists including the Head of Odisha state committee Chalpathi who had a bounty of ₹1 crore. A large cache of weapons including SLR's, AK-47's, INSAS and ammunition was also recovered from the area.
- 22 January: Two Maoists were killed including an area commander in an encounter by Security forces in Bokaro district, Jharkhand.
- 25 January: A report by Chhattisgarh Police estimates that about 600 active cadres remain in jungles across the country as of January 2025.
- 28 January: Seven Maoists of the Jharkhand Sangharsh Jan Mukti Morcha (JSJMM) group tried to obtain a levy from a brick factory by threatening the workers in Latehar district, Jharkhand but the villagers attacked the Maoists and the local chief of the Maoist was beaten to death and two others severely injured while the rest of the group managed to escape.
- 29 January:
  - Two Maoists were killed in an operation with Security Forces in Singhbhum district, Jharkhand.
  - 29 Maoists surrendered to the Security forces in Narayanpur district, Chhattisgarh.
- 1 February: 8 Maoists were killed in a gunfight with Security forces in Bijapur district, Chhattisgarh.
- 2 February: The last remaining Maoist cadre in Karnataka state surrendered to authorities and the Government declared State of Karnataka to be free of Maoist activities.
- 3 February: A Maoist was killed and weapons seized in an encounter in Kanker district, Chhattisgarh.
- 4 February: Two civilians were killed by Maoists after attacking them with a sharp edged weapon in Bijapur district, Chhattisgarh.
- 5 February: A civilian was killed by Maoists accusing him of being a Police informer in Dantewada district, Chhattisgarh.
- 9 February: 2025 Bijapur clash: 31 Maoists and 2 Security Personnel were killed in an encounter in Indravati National Park in Bijapur district, Chhattisgarh.
- 19 February: Four Maoists including three women cadre were killed and many injured in an encounter with Police in Balaghat district, Madhya Pradesh. The Police also discovered an INSAS rifle, a 0.303 bore rifle and a SLR.
- 22 February: The last known Maoist cadre operating in Kerala known as Santhosh was arrested by Security forces in Coimbatore. As a result of this arrest Maoist movement has effectively collapsed in the state and the State of Kerala is declared "Naxal free".
- 1 March: Two Maoists were killed in an encounter by Security Forces in Sukma district, Chhattisgarh.
- 7 March: A Mine worker was killed and another injured in an IED blast triggered by Maoists in Narayanpur district, Chhattisgarh.
- 11 March: Three Maoists with a cumulative bounty of ₹18 lakhs surrendered to the Security Forces in Gariaband District, Chhattisgarh. All of them were involved in the 21 January encounter which killed the Senior leader Chalpathy.
- 20 March: In two separate encounters, 30 Maoists and 1 Security personnel were killed and large cache of arms and ammunition recovered in Bijapur and Kanker district, Chhattisgarh.
- 25 March: Three Maoists including a Senior commander were killed in an encounter with Security Forces along the border of Bijapur and Dantewada district, Chhattisgarh.
- 29 March: In a Joint operation conducted by CRPF and DRG personnel lead to a gunfight which killed 16 Maoists and injured two Security personnel along Sukma-Dantewada districts, Chhattisgarh.
- 5 April: In a major event, 86 Maoist cadres from various different formations surrendered before the Police in Telangana.
- 6 April: 11 militia members of the CPI(maoist) surrendered before police in Alluri Sitharama Raju district, Andhra Pradesh.
- 7 April: 26 Maoist cadres surrendered to the Police in Chhattisgarh, reporting their desire to return to normal life and assistance provided by the State to surrendered cadres.
- 12 April: Three Maoists were killed in an encounter with Security forces in Bijapur district, Chhattisgarh.
- 16 April: Two Maoists with a cumulative bounty of 13 lakh rupees were killed in an encounter in Narayanpur district.
- 21 April: In an operation by security forces, 8 Maoist were killed including top leader Prayag Manjhi alias Vivek who had a bounty of ₹1 crore, several arms were also seized in this operation in Bokaro district, Jharkhand.
- 24 April: As part of large operation launched by CRPF with support from State police forces of Telangana, Maharashtra and Chhattisgarh three maoists were killed and weapons seized in Bijapur district. As per reports the operation to Capture or kill Top maoists Deva, Hidma and completely dismantle Battalion No.1 of the PLGA, which is considered to be the most dangerous.
- 7 May: As part of a larger operation, 22 Maoists were killed by Security Forces in Bijapur district, Chhattisgarh.
- 8 May:
  - Three Greyhound personnel, which is the Anti-naxal squad of Telegana, were killed in a landmine blast planted by Maoists in Wazeedu–Perur forest zone of Mulugu district, Telegana.
  - Two Maoists were killed in an exchange of fire with Security Forces in Alluri Sitharama Raju district, Andhra Pradesh. The Forces also recovered two Ak-47s from the site and indicated that the two killed belonged to a 15-member Maoist group that managed to escape from Security Forces Operations two weeks ago and one of the few Maoists remaining in the State.
- 21 May: 2025 Abujhmarh clash: In a Massive operation, Security forces killed 26 Maoists including the General-Secretary of CPI (Maoist) and top Maoist leader Nambala Keshava Rao with a bounty of ₹1.5 Crores. The encounter is seen as a turning point since the leader of the group was killed.
- 22 May: One Maoist and one CoBRA commando of CRPF was killed in an exchange of fire in Bijapur district, Chhattisgarh.
- 23 May: Four Maoists were killed in an exchange of fire with C-60 Commando's of Maharashtra Police in Gadircholi district, Maharashtra.
- 24 May: Two Maoists from the Jharkhand Jan Mukti Parishad (JJMP) was killed and another injured in an encounter with Security forces in Latehar district, Jharkhand. The killed include Pappu Lohra, who is the Current leader of the group carrying a reward of ₹10 lakh and Prabhat Ghanju who is Second-in-command carrying a reward of ₹5 lakh.
- 26 May: A Maoist carrying ₹5 lakh bounty was killed and another maoist carrying ₹10 lakh bounty was arrested in an operation in Latehar district, Jharkhand.
- 27 May: A Maoist commander was killed in an encounter by Security forces in Palamu district, Jharkhand.
- 7 June: 7 Maoists were killed including Central Committee members Sudhakar with a bounty of ₹40 lakhs and Bhaskar with a bounty of ₹45 lakhs was killed in an encounter by Security forces in Bijapur district, Chhattisgarh.
- 11 June: Two Maoists including a local commander with a ₹5 lakh bounty was killed in an encounter in Sukma district, Chhattisgarh.
- 14 June: Four Maoists were killed in a clash with Security forces in Balaghat district, Madhya Pradesh.
- 17 June: Three villagers were strangled to death by Maoists in an attempt to instigate fear among the population in Bijapur district, Chhattisgarh.
- 18 June: Three Maoists including two senior leaders were killed by Greyhounds forces in Alluri Sitarama district, Andhra Pradesh. The killed Maoists include Central Committee member Gajarla Ravi alias Uday with a bounty of ₹20 lakhs and Aruna, who is the wife of the deceased Maoist leader of Odisha State committee Chalpathi. Uday is also the Leader of Andhra-Odisha Special Zonal Committee in which Aruna is also a member.
- 26 June: Two female Maoists were killed in an encounter with Security Forces in Narayanpur district, Chhattisgarh.
- 9 July: 12 Naxalites including 2 women, who had a total bounty of 2.85 million rupees, surrendered to the police in Dantewada, Chhattisgarh.
- 11 July: 22 Naxalites with a total bounty of 3.7 million rupees who had presence in the Abhujmad forest region, surrendered to the police in Narayanpur, Chhattisgarh.
- 12 July: 23 Naxalites with a total bounty of 11.8 million rupees surrendered to the police in Chhattisgarh's Sukma district. This included 11 senior cadres of the PLGA.
- 14 July: An IED device planted by Naxalites exploded, injuring 3 people including a teenage girl in Bijapur district, Chhattisgarh.
- 16 July: Two Maoists and one CRPF personnel were killed in an exchange of fire in Bokaro district, Jharkhand.
- 17 July: 2 Maoists including the founder of the cultural wing of the Communist Party of India (Maoist) surrendered to the Rachakonda Police Commissioner after 45 years of being underground.
- 18 July: 6 Maoists were killed in an encounter with security forces in the Abujhmad region.
- 20 July: Maoists killed 2 people in Bijaipur, Chhattisgarh.
- 26 July:
  - Three Maoists of the Jharkhand Jan Mukti Parishad (JJMP) group were killed in an encounter with security forces along with one Ak-47 and two INSAS rifles being seized in Gumla district, Jharkhand.
  - Four Maoists were killed in a clash with Security forces in Bijapur district, Chhattisgarh.
- 6 August: An area commander belonging to the PLFI Maoist group, with a bounty of ₹15 lakhs, was killed in a clash with police forces in Gumla district, Jharkhand.
- 13 August: Two senior Maoists with bounties of ₹25 lakhs and ₹10 lakhs respectively were killed in an encounter with Security Forces in Chhattisgarh.
- 24 August: Six mining vehicles were torched by Maoist in Hazaribagh district, Jharkhand.
- 27 August: Maoists killed a sikhshadoot (temporary visiting teacher to government schools) in Sukma district of chhattisgarh. Family members of the sikshadoot trier to intervene but were also assaulted by Maoista. Eyewitnesses state the sikshadoot was killed with sharp-edge weapons.
- 29 August:
  - Maoists killed a sikhshadoot (temporary visiting teacher to government schools) in Bijapur district of Chhattisgarh.
  - A Maoist weapons dump was found in Chhattisgarh containing more than 300 weapons including Ak-47, Insas, double- barrel grenade launcher. Maoist were reportedly fled left behind the dump.
- 2 September: Two villagers were killed by Maoists in Sukma district of Chhattisgarh. Sukma Superintendent of Police (SP) Kiran S. Chavan confirmed the murder of two villagers named Devendra Padami and Padam Pojja, residents of the Nandapara area of Sirsetti village.
- 5 September: A Maoist was killed in an encounter with security forces in Thulthuli forest.
- 7 September: A Maoist carrying a reward of ₹10 lakh was killed in an encounter with security forces in West Singbhum district, Jharkhand.
- 10 September:
  - A Maoist carrying a reward of ₹8 lakh was killed in an encounter with security forces in kanker district, chhattisgarh.
  - 16 Maoist surrendered to police in Narayanpur district, Chhattisgarh.
- 11 September: A Maoist member of central committee named Balakrishna along with other 9 Maoist were killed in an encounter with security forces in Gariaband district, chhattisgarh.
- 12 September: Two Maoist were killed in an encounter with security forces in Bijaipur, chhattisgarh.
- 15 September: At least 3 Maoists including Sahdev Soren carrying a bounty of ₹1 Crore and combined bounty of ₹1.35 Crore were killed in Pati Piri forest of Jharkhand’s Hazaribagh district.
- 17 September: Two Maoists were killed in an encounter in Bijapur district, Chhattisgarh.
- 18 September: 12 Naxals carrying bounty of Rs 18 lakhs surrender before police in Narayanpur.
- 22 September: Two top Top Central Committee members, Kadari Satyanarayana Reddy alias Kosa and Katta Ramchandra Reddy alias Raju of CPI (Maoist) with a bounty of ₹40 lakh each, were killed in an encounter with Security Forces in Narayanpur district, Chhattisgarh.
- 24 September: Three Maoists of the Jharkhand Jan Mukti Parishad (JJMP) was killed in a clash with Security forces in Gumla district, Jharkhand.
- 28 September: Three Maoists with a cumulative bounty of ₹14 lakh were killed in an encounter with Security Forces in Kanker district, Chhattisgarh.
- 2 October:
  - A former member of the Maoists was killed by his associates who accused him of being a police informant in Telangana.
  - In a mass surrender event, 103 Maoist cadres with a combined bounty of ₹1.06 crore surrendered to authorities in Bijapur district, Chhattisgarh.
- 15 October: Top Maoist leader and Central Committee member Mallujola Venugopal alias Abhay surrendered to the Maharashtra Police along with 60 other cadres.
- 16 October: In a mass event 170 Maoist cadres surrendered to officials in Chhattisgarh.
- 12 November: Six Maoists were killed in an encounter with Security forces in Bijapur district, Chhattisgarh.
- 16 November: Three Maoists with a combined bounty of ₹15 lakh were killed in a clash with security forces in Sukma district, Chhattisgarh.
- 18 November: Top Maoist commander and Central Committee member Madvi Hidma was killed along with his wife and four other Maoist cadres in a clash with security forces in Alluri Sitharama Raju district, Andhra Pradesh. Hidma was the leader of the Dandakaranya Special Zonal Committee and had a bounty of more than ₹1 crore.
- 19 November: Seven Maoists were killed, including Metturi Joga Rao alias Tech Shankar who is the head of the Andhra-Odisha Border committee, in an encounter with security forces in Alluri Sitarama Raju district, Andhra Pradesh.
- 3 December: 18 Maoists and three DRG personnel were killed in an exchange of fire along the Bijapur-Dantewada border area, Chhattisgarh.
- 12 December: The states of Maharashtra and Madhya Pradesh were declared free from Maoist insurgency after the surrender of the last active cadre there.
- 18 December: Three Maoists were killed in an encounter with security forces in Sukma district, Chhattisgarh.
- 24 December: Two Maoists carrying ₹24 lakh cumulative bounty were killed in encounter with Security Forces in Kandhamal district, Odisha. Reports suggest there are only 80 Maoists remaining in Odisha, with only 10 of them being from Odisha.
- 25 December: Top Maoist leader Ganesh Uike and three other Maoists were killed in a joint Operation by the CRPF, BSF and Odisha Police in Kandhamal district, Odisha. Uike was the last remaining Central Committee member of the CPI (Maoist) and Head of its Odisha Committee. He had a cumulative bounty of more than ₹2 crore in various states.

== 2026 ==
- 2 January: Senior commander and Head of Battalion No. 1, Barsa Deva, along with 19 other Maoist cadre surrendered to the Telangana government along with 48 weapons, 2,200 rounds of ammunition and ₹20 lakh of extorted money.
- 3 January:
  - Two Maoists were killed in an encounter with security forces in Bijapur district, Chhattisgarh.
  - 12 Maoists were killed in an encounter with security forces in Sukma district, Chhattisgarh.
- 16 January: Two Maoists were killed in an encounter with security forces in Bijapur district, Chhattisgarh.
- 22 January: 16 Maoists, including senior leader Pathiram Manjhi alias Anal Da carrying a bounty of ₹2.35 crore, were killed in a clash with security forces in West Singhbhum district, Jharkhand.
- 29 January: Two Maoists were killed in an encounter with security forces in Bijapur district, Chhattisgarh.
- 7 February: 51 Maoists, including 34 women, with a combined bounty of ₹1.61 crore surrendered to the police in Bijapur and Sukma districts.
- 22 February: General Secretary of the CPI (Maoist) and Politburo member Thippiri Tirupathi surrendered to the Telangana Police in Mulugu district. Central Committee member Malla Raji Reddy also surrendered along with 20 others.
- 25 February: Maoist Divisional Committee member Mallesh, who had a ₹8 lakh bounty, surrendered to the BSF in Kanker district.
- 1 March: 15 Maoists surrendered to the police in Mahasamund district, Chhattisgarh.
- 5 March: A Maoist with a 5 lakh bounty was killed in an encounter with security forces in Chhattisgarh.
- 7 March: 130 Maoists surrendered to the Telangana police in Hyderabad; after their surrender, the Telangana state committee of the CPI (Maoist) ceased to exist.
- 13 March: In a mass surrender event, 108 Maoist cadre with a cumulative bounty of ₹3.95 crore surrendered to the police in Bastar region of Chhattisgarh.
- 14 March: Two Maoists with a combined bounty of ₹12 lakh were arrested in Latehar district.
- 20 March: 11 Maoists surrendered to the police in Gadchiroli district.
- 23 March: Eight Maoists of the Tritiya Prastuti Committee were arrested in Hazaribagh district, Jharkhand.
- 25 March: 18 Maoists, including Zonal Committee member Papa Rao with a ₹55 lakh bounty and two Divisional Committee members, surrendered in Bijapur district. Five Maoists, including State Committee member Sukru who had a ₹55 lakh bounty, surrendered in Kandhamal district.
- 29 March: A Maoist with a bounty of ₹5 lakh was killed in an encounter with security forces in Sukma district.
- 30 March:
  - Nine Maoists including the Andhra-Odisha committee head with a ₹25 lakh bounty surrendered to the Andhra Pradesh police, after this surrender there are no Maoists left in the state and it was declared free from the Maoist insurgency.
  - Minister of Home Affairs Amit Shah officially declared the end of the Naxalite–Maoist insurgency in India, however, he added that some Maoists are still yet to surrender.
- 31 March: In another mass surrender, 44 Maoists surrendered in Bijapur and Sukma districts. Police also recovered 93 weapons, ₹3 crore in cash, and gold worth ₹11 crore from the surrendered cadre and Maoist hideouts.
- 6 April: 30 Maoists surrendered to the Telangana police.
- 10 April: 42 Maoists surrendered to the Telangana police.
- 13 April: A female Maoist was killed in an encounter with security forces in Kanker district.
- 17 April: Four Maoists with a cumulative bounty of ₹26 lakh were killed in an encounter with security forces on the border of Hazaribagh and Chatra districts.
- 25 April: 47 Maoists surrendered to the Telangana Police in Hyderabad.
- 29 April: A Maoist was killed in an encounter with security forces in West Singbhum district.
- 3 May: Four policemen were killed in an accidental explosion while attempting to demine IEDs laid by Maoists in forests on the Kanker-Narayanpur border.
- 6 May: A Maoist leader of the Tritiya Prastuti Committee was arrested in Latehar district. Two Maoists from another organisation were also arrested in Latehar district on the same day.
- 10 May: Two Maoists were arrested by the police in Khunti district, Jharkhand.
- 12 May: Maoist Regional Committee member Shraddha Biswas with a bounty of ₹15 lakh was arrested by the Kolkata Police in Cossipore. Maoist leader Madhai Patra also surrendered to the Kolkata Police on the same day.
- 13 May: A Maoist leader with a bounty of ₹20 lakh surrendered along with his wife before the Telangana police.
- 15 May: A total of four elephants died in Jharkhand till 15 May because of blast injuries sustained from IEDs planted by Maoists.
- 17 May: Over the course of four days, eight Maoists were arrested and five surrendered in Gadchiroli district. The 13 Maoists had a combined bounty of ₹1 crore. Gadchiroli district and the state of Maharashtra were declared Naxal-free after these events.
- 21 May: 27 Maoists active in the Saranda forest region surrendered before the Jharkhand Police in Ranchi. Eight of them had a combined bounty of ₹33 lakh.
- 26 May: Two Maoists, including one with a ₹5 lakh bounty, were arrested in Latehar district.
- 28 May: A Maoist with a ₹10 lakh bounty was arrested in Ranchi.
- 6 June: A Maoist was arrested in Latehar.
- 17 June: A Maoist with a ₹10 lakh bounty surrendered before the Kolkata Police.
- 22 June: Seven Maoists, including a PLFI area commander, were arrested in Khunti.
- 13 July: A Maoist with a ₹20 lakh bounty was arrested in Latehar.
- 17 July: Three Maoists, including one with a ₹25 lakh bounty, were arrested in Giridih.
- 28 July: 16 Maoists with a combined bounty of ₹39 lakh surrendered in Ranchi.
- 29 July: Eight Maoists with a combined bounty of ₹49 lakh surrendered in Bijapur.
- 29 July: The last active Maoist Central politburo member, Misir Besra, with a combined bounty of ₹2.2 crore, was arrested in Dhanbad along with two Maoists with a combined bounty of ₹15 lakh.
- 5 August: Three Maoists with a combined bounty of ₹22 lakh were arrested in Jharkhand.
- 11 August: Four Maoists with a combined bounty of ₹11 lakh surrendered in Jharkhand.
- 12 August: A Maoist with a bounty of ₹20 lakh surrendered in Hyderabad.
- 18 August: Four Maoists, including one with a ₹5 lakh bounty, were arrested in Jharkhand. Another Maoist wanted for killing two policemen was also arrested in Jharkhand.
- 26 August: Three Maoists surrendered in Polavaram district, Andhra Pradesh.
- 12 September: Three Maoists including a woman, with a combined bounty of ₹26 lakh, surrendered in Bankura district, West Bengal. After their surrender, only five Maoists remain active in the region between Palamu and the Dalma Hills, with their combined bounty set at ₹37 lakh. The last active Central Committee/Politburo member, Akash alias Asim Mandal, fled to West Bengal and is negotiating surrender with the police.
- 15 September: Two Maoists including a woman surrendered in Palnadu district, Andhra Pradesh; and one female Maoist surrendered in Nizamabad, Telangana.
- 17 September: Akash alias Asim Mandal, with a combined bounty of ₹2.2 crore, was arrested by the police in Purba Medinipur district, West Bengal.
- 20 September: The last two active Maoists in the Dalma Hills, a married couple with a combined bounty of ₹7 lakh, were arrested in Paschim Medinipur district, West Bengal.
- 20 September: The last active Tritiya Prastuti Committee commander, Brijesh Ganjhu, with a bounty of ₹30 lakh, was killed in an encounter with security forces in Varanasi.
- 28 September: A Maoist surrendered before a court in Motihari, Bihar, after previously being arrested and released by a policeman in Palamu, Jharkhand.
- 29 September: Two Maoists surrendered before a district court in Giridih, Jharkhand.
- 12 October: Six Maoists with a combined bounty of ₹35 lakh surrendered in Bijapur, Chattisgarh. A member of the Tritiya Prastuti Committee was arrested in Chatra district, Jharkhand.
- 23 October: Two Maoists with a combined bounty of ₹7 lakh surrendered before the Kolkata Police.
- 7 November: A Maoist active in Palamu district, with a bounty of ₹10 lakh, was arrested in Thakurli, Maharashtra.

== Casualties by year ==
Casualties by year
Year	Incidents	Deaths				
Year	Incidents	Civilians	Security Forces	Maoists	Not Specified	Total
2000	116	94	40	135	9	278
2001	199	130	116	169	44	459
2002	182	123	115	163	30	431
2003	319	193	114	246	30	583
2004	127	89	82	87	22	280
2005	343	259	147	282	24	712
2006	248	249	128	343	14	734
2007	274	218	234	195	25	672
2008	246	184	215	228	19	646
2009	407	368	319	314	12	1013
2010	481	630	267	265	18	1180
2011	302	259	137	210	0	606
2012	235	156	96	125	1	378
2013	186	164	103	151	0	418
2014	185	127	98	121	4	350
2015	171	90	56	110	0	256
2016	263	122	62	250	0	434
2017	200	107	76	152	0	335
2018	218	108	73	231	0	412
2019	176	99	49	154	0	302
2020	138	61	44	134	0	239
2021	124	58	51	128	0	237
2022	107	53	15	66	0	134
2023	113	61	31	57	0	149
2024	161	80	21	296	0	397
2025	141	54	33	390	0	477
2026	26	4	4	74	0	82
Total	5687	4140	2726	5075	252	12193

== See also ==
- Communist terrorism
- Naxalite and Maoist groups in India
- Separatist movements of India
- Terrorism in India
- Terrorist incidents in India
