= Bastar Fighter Force =

Bastar Fighter Force बस्तर फाइटर फोर्स
- Common name: Bastar Fighters

Agency overview
- Formed: 2022
- Employees: Approximately 2,100
- Legal personality: Governmental: Government agency

Jurisdictional structure
- National agency (Operations jurisdiction): India
- Federal agency (Operations jurisdiction): India
- Operations jurisdiction: Chhattisgarh Police, India
- Legal jurisdiction: Chhattisgarh, India
- Governing body: Government of Chhattisgarh
- General nature: Federal law enforcement

Operational structure
- Parent agency: Chhattisgarh Police

The Bastar Fighter Force is a specialized police unit established in 2022 by the Government of Chhattisgarh in India. It was created to combat Maoist insurgency and left-wing extremism in the Bastar division, which has been significantly affected by Naxalite violence. It comprises approximately 2,100 personnel, as of March 2024.

== History ==
In 2020, the Chhattisgarh government decided to establish a special police unit to combat the Naxalite–Maoist insurgency and left-wing extremism. The unit was announced in February 2021 after the cabinet of Chief Minister Bhupesh Baghel approved the formation of the Bastar Fighter Force. It was formed in 2022. Since its establishment, the Bastar Fighter Force has participated in many operations targeting Maoists. It conducts its operations often in collaboration with other security agencies, such as the Border Security Force and District Reserve Guard.

In 2022, it was reported that nine transgender individuals were recruited into the Bastar Fighter Force. In 2023, these transgender personnel participated in the Republic Day parade for the first time in Jagdalpur, Chhattisgarh.

In March 2024, a Bastar Fighter was killed during an encounter with Maoists in Kanker district, becoming the first casualty of the unit since its formation.

== Recruitment ==
All personnel of the Bastar Fighter Force are recruited from local villages across the districts of Bastar, Kanker, Kondagaon, Sukma, Narayanpur, Bijapur, and Dantewada. These recruits undergo training provided by the Chhattisgarh Police. Each district has deployed around 300 personnel from this force to ensure a robust local presence in anti-Maoist operations.

It has been reported that candidates who apply for recruitment into the force but are not selected live in exile, often forced to take menial jobs far from their homes due to threats and fear of Maoists. Additionally, Maoists distributed pamphlets warning of consequences for those who apply when the unit was announced.
