= Rajnandgaon ambush =

2009 Maoist attack in India

- Part of Naxalite-Maoist insurgency
Date	12 July 2009
Location	Village Korkutti, District Rajnandgaon (India's Chhattisgarh state)

Belligerents
Communist Party of India (Maoist)	India (Chhattisgarh Police)

Commanders and leaders
Unknown	Vinod Kumar Choubey †

Strength
300	40

Casualties and losses
Unknown	Approximately 29 killed

The Rajnandgaon ambush occurred on 12 July 2009, when around 29 members of the Indian Police were killed in three connected attacks by Maoist naxalite in Rajnandgaon, 90 km (56 mi) from Raipur (India's Chhattisgarh state).

== Incident ==
In the morning of 12 July 2009, Vinod Kumar Chaubey who was the Superintendent of Police of Rajnandgaon district received a message about a naxalite attack in Madanwada that had killed two policemen. Chaubey travelled to the spot with reinforcements, and was attacked along the way. The rebels lay in ambush along a stretch of the road where they had placed land mines. All in all, at least 29 policemen were killed, including Chaubey.

Chaubey was posthumously awarded the Kirti Chakra award for gallantry, by the President of India.

The Rajnandgaon ambush is one of the most serious attacks carried out by the naxalite rebels in Chhattisgarh.

== See also ==
- Timeline of the Naxalite–Maoist insurgency
