= 2025 Abujhmarh clash =

Maoist attack in India

- Part of the Naxalite-Maoist insurgency
Date	21 May 2025
Location	Abujhmarh, Chhattisgarh, India
Result	Government victory

Belligerents
Communist Party of India (Maoist)	India

Commanders and leaders
Nambala Keshava Rao †	(India) Arun Deo Gautam

Units involved
PLGA	District Reserve Guard

Strength
35	100+

Casualties and losses
28 killed	1 Killed; 1 injured

The 2025 Abujhmarh clash was an encounter between Communist Party of India (Maoist) and Indian security forces in the Abujhmarh forest area in Chhattisgarh, India. It was among the deadliest clashes in the recent history of the Naxalite–Maoist insurgency in India. The Maoist leader Nambala Keshava Rao, having a combined bounty of ₹3.5 Crore (around US$410,000), was killed in the encounter.

== Background ==
Four units of District Reserve Guard were combing the area of Maad, which is a remote area in Abhujmarh known for its insurgent activity, the forces had already got intelligence indicating presence of top Maoist leaders camping near the area.

Until 2023, the Abhujmarh forest was a safe haven for Maoists and most senior leadership camped in that area. The hunt for the top Nambala Keshava Rao had begun months earlier, with each surrendering cadre being thoroughly interrogated by the Intelligence unit to get any information regarding the top leadership. The Cadres of Platoon No.7, which guarded the top leaders and was a top lookout for the Security forces, had valuable information regarding the leadership and were capable of navigating the dense Abhujmarh forest. Many of the captured cadres tried to mislead investigators by giving false or distorted statements but any information regarding the target was noted by the authorities.

== Incident ==
On 20 May, the day before the encounter, the District Reserve Guard members were searching the Maad area of the Abhujmarh forest for Senior members of the group. The unit could not find them and settled in for the night. Unbeknownst to the DRG, Nambala Keshava Rao and his Platoon No.7 was also spending the night just 1 km ahead of them.

On 21 May, at 7 AM a sapper from the Maoists suddenly encountered a DRG soldier searching the area; in panic, the sapper bayoneted the DRG soldier and during the scuffle, a shot was fired. The Maoist subsequently ran toward the south of the forest but encountered a unit of the Security forces before running north and encountering another unit of DRG. Feeling surrounded, they formed a defensive perimeter around a person in an elevated position and fired. The DRG suspected the person was a high value target and so returned fire taking out the target. After the sapper's death, the remaining Maoists scattered, but were ultimately all killed.

After the firefight subsided, a DRG member who was a former Maoist and served in the Platoon No.7 identified the killed target as Nambala Keshava Rao, alias Basavraj, who is the General-Seceretary of the CPI (Maoist), the highest position of the group. A cache of weapons was also recovered from the site. Anthe senior member included Madhu, who is the Senior member in the Dandakaranya Special Zonal Committee (DSZC).

== Aftermath ==
The Operation can be considered as a severe blow to Maoist group and its insurgency as its leader has been eliminated. Nambala Keshava Rao had a bounty of ₹3.5 Crore by different state and central agencies on his head and was placed in the NIA Most Wanted list and it was the first time in three decades since the top most leader of the group was eliminated.

Minister of Home Affairs Amit Shah has vowed to eliminate Maoist insurgency by March 2026 and this incident can be considered a major step towards the stated goal. The Karnataka BJP unit in reference to the killings, posted an AI generated meme featuring Shah holding a cauliflower over a tombstone engraved "Naxalism Rest in Peace", in its Twitter account. The cauliflower plant had emerged as an insider dogwhistle among Hindu nationalists and Hindu fundamentalists, referring to the 1989 Bhagalpur riots, where an attempt was made to hide a mass grave of 116 Bihari Muslims killed by Hindus by planting cauliflower seeds over the ground, making its first appearance in the communal clashes in Nagpur that occurred 2 months before.

The total bounty of the killed cadres was ₹12.3 crores which will be equally distributed to the DRG unit personnel who took part in this operation.

== See also ==
- 2024 Kanker clash
- 2024 Abujhmarh clash
- 2025 Bijapur clash
