= 2025 Bijapur clash =

Maoist attack in India

- Part of the Naxalite-Maoist insurgency
Date	9 February 2025
Location	Indravati National Park, Chhattisgarh, India
Result	Government victory

Belligerents
Communist Party of India (Maoist)	India

Commanders and leaders
Unknown	Unknown

Units involved
People's Liberation Guerrilla Army (India) (PLGA)	• District Reserve Guard • Special Task Force

Strength
50+	650

Casualties and losses
31+ killed	2 killed 2 injured

The 2025 Bijapur clash was a significant encounter between Indian security forces and Maoist insurgents in the Indravati National Park, Bijapur district, Chhattisgarh, India. On February 9, 2025, acting on intelligence reports of a large Maoist gathering, a combined force of approximately 650 security forces personnel carried out an operation in the densely forested region.

The ensuing gunfight resulted in the deaths of at least 31 Maoist rebels and two security personnel, marking it as the deadliest encounter for the rebels in 2025. Two additional security personnel sustained injuries during the clash. Afterwards the security forces recovered many weapons.

== Background ==
The Indravati National Park has historically served as a stronghold for Maoist activities due to its extensive forest cover, spanning approximately 2,799 square kilometers.

== Incident ==
The security forces, which included the District Reserve Guards (DRG) and Special Task Forces (STF) were sent to the area after a tip-off about a large group of Maoists moving in the area.

A fierce gunfight occurred from both sides and after the encounter, the bodies of 31 Maoists were found in the area, but police suggested there could be more killed, and a search operation was launched. Security forces also sustained casualties including one DRG personnel and one STF personnel killed and 2 others injured.

The Security Forces recovered many weapons including AK-47 ('Kalashnikov') assault rifles, Indian made INSAS rifles, self-loading rifles (SLRs), grenade launchers and explosives from the site.

The incident is part of a series of confrontations in Chhattisgarh, reflecting the persistent challenges posed by the Maoist insurgency in central India.

== See also ==
- 2024 Kanker clash
- 2024 Abujhmarh clash
- 2025 Abujhmarh clash
