= 2024 Abujhmarh clash =

Maoist attack in India

- Part of the Naxalite-Maoist insurgency
Date	4 October 2024
Location	Abujhmarh, Chhattisgarh, India
Result	Indian victory • Maoist activity greatly suppressed

Belligerents
Communist Party of India (Maoist)	India

Commanders and leaders
Niti †	Unknown

Units involved
PLGA	District Reserve Guard; Special Task Force

Strength
50+	100+

Casualties and losses
38 killed	None

The 2024 Abujhmarh clash was an encounter between Communist Party of India (Maoist) and Indian security forces in the Abujhmarh forest area in Chhattisgarh, India. It was the deadliest encounter for the rebels since the start of the insurgency.

== Background ==
Anti-Naxal operations have greatly increased in 2024 especially in the Abujhmarh forest area of Chhattisgarh which have been considered a Maoist stronghold. The Maoists had a great setback due to the operations with more than 200 cadres killed in the year 2024.

== Encounter ==
The police had an information that a meeting consisting of senior Maoist cadres of East Bastar Division had convened a meeting in the Thulthuli village this week and a huge gathering was happening in the area.

As per the information, units of District Reserve Guards and Special Task Force consisting more than 100 soldiers was sent out to the Abhujmarh forest area. At 12:30 PM (IST) an encounter broke out between Maoist cadres and the soldiers resulting in the death of more than 31 Maoists and a huge cache of weapons and ammunition discovered including Ak-47s, Self-Loading Rifles (SLR's) and grenades.

As of 5 October, police have identified 15 bodies of the total killed and they had a total bounty of ₹1.3 crore. A senior cadre named Niti alias Urmila having a bounty of ₹25 lakhs was also killed in the encounter.

On 19 October, Maoists revealed that they had lost 38 of their comrades and some also injured in the encounter increasing the official death toll. The total bounty of the deceased Maoists accounted to ₹2.62 crores.

== See also ==
- 2024 Kanker clash
- 2025 Bijapur clash
