= 2025 Bijapur Naxal attack =

Maoist attack in Chhattisgarh, India

Bijapur Naxal attack
- Part of the Naxalite-Maoist insurgency
| Date | 6 January 2025 |
| Location | Bijapur district, Chhattisgarh, India |
| Result | Maoist victory: Government intensifies anti-naxal and maoist operation |

Belligerents
| Communist Party of India (Maoist) | India |

Units involved
| | District Reserve Guard (DRG) |

Casualties and losses
| None | 9 killed (8 security personnel, 1 civilian driver) |
- The attack was carried out using an IED weighing 60–70 kg; it was the largest assault on security forces in the state in two years

On 6 January 2025, an attack occurred in Bijapur district, Chhattisgarh, India, where nine individuals were killed, including eight security personnel from the District Reserve Guard (DRG) and a civilian driver. The attack was carried out by Naxalites, who planted an improvised explosive device (IED) weighing between 60 and 70 kg. It was the largest assault by Maoist insurgents on security forces in the state of Chhattisgarh in the past two years.

== Attack ==
The attack took place on the Bedre-Kutru Road at approximately 2:15 PM IST near Ambeli village, within the Kutru police station area in Bijapur district. The DRG personnel were returning to their base in Dantewada after participating in a three-day anti-Naxalite operation in Abujhmarh that had resulted in the deaths of five Maoists. The vehicle they were traveling in, a Scorpio, was destroyed by a powerful improvised explosive device (IED) planted by the Naxals. The explosion caused a crater about 10 feet deep and 25–30 feet wide in the road and threw the vehicle carrying the security personnel into the air. Debris from the blast was found stuck in trees as high as 25 feet.

Inspector General of Police for Bastar Range, Sundarraj P, confirmed that the IED was likely a "command IED," which is manually triggered from a distance. This particular device was believed to have been planted well in advance, as evidence suggested that grass had grown over the wires connected to it.

== Casualties ==
All nine individuals, who were members of the District Reserve Guard and a civilian driver aboard the vehicle, were killed instantly in the IED blast. Their bodies were dismembered and placed on plastic sheets for evacuation. After the attack, reinforcements were sent to the scene, and security forces began a search operation in the surrounding area.

== Reactions ==
Chhattisgarh Chief Minister Vishnu Deo Sai expressed his condolences to the families of the deceased and condemned the attack as a cowardly act stemming from frustration among Naxals due to ongoing counter-insurgency operations.

India's Home Minister Amit Shah vowed to eliminate Naxalism from the country by March 2026 and asserted that the sacrifice of those killed by extremists in Chhattisgarh would not be in vain. Shah expressed his deep sorrow in a post on X in Hindi, stating, 'I am deeply saddened by the news of the loss of DRG soldiers in the IED blast in Bijapur (Chhattisgarh). I express my deepest condolences to the families of the brave soldiers. It is impossible to express this grief in words, but I assure the sacrifice of our soldiers will not go in vain. We will end Naxalism from India by March 2026.'

The President of India, Droupadi Murmu, condemned the attack, stating, 'The Maoist attack on security forces in Bijapur, Chhattisgarh is condemnable. I express my heartfelt condolences to the bereaved families of the brave soldiers who made the ultimate sacrifice for the security of the nation. Our country is committed to completely eradicating Maoists.'

The Speaker of the Chhattisgarh Legislative Assembly and former Chief Minister Raman Singh condemned the attack, stating, 'Whenever big operations are carried out against them, these Naxalites resort to cowardly attacks. I express my condolences to the families of the jawans who lost their lives in this attack. The significant steps being taken by the Chhattisgarh government and the central government will further strengthen these efforts.'

Other leaders who paid their condolences include Chhattisgarh Deputy Chief Minister Arun Sao, Chhattisgarh Governor Ramen Deka, Leader of Opposition in Lok Sabha Rahul Gandhi, Lok Sabha MP Priyanka Gandhi, and Congress President Mallikarjun Kharge.

== Aftermath ==
In December 2025, Maoist Central Committee member Ganesh Uike, who carried a bounty of over ₹1 crore, was killed in a joint security operation by Odisha Police's Special Operation Group along with CRPF and BSF in Kandhamal district.
