= Abujhmarh Peace Marathon =

- Date: February
- Location: Narayanpur, Chhattisgarh, Inda
- Event type: Road
- Distance: Marathon, Half marathon
- Established: 2019
- Participants: 11797 (2021)

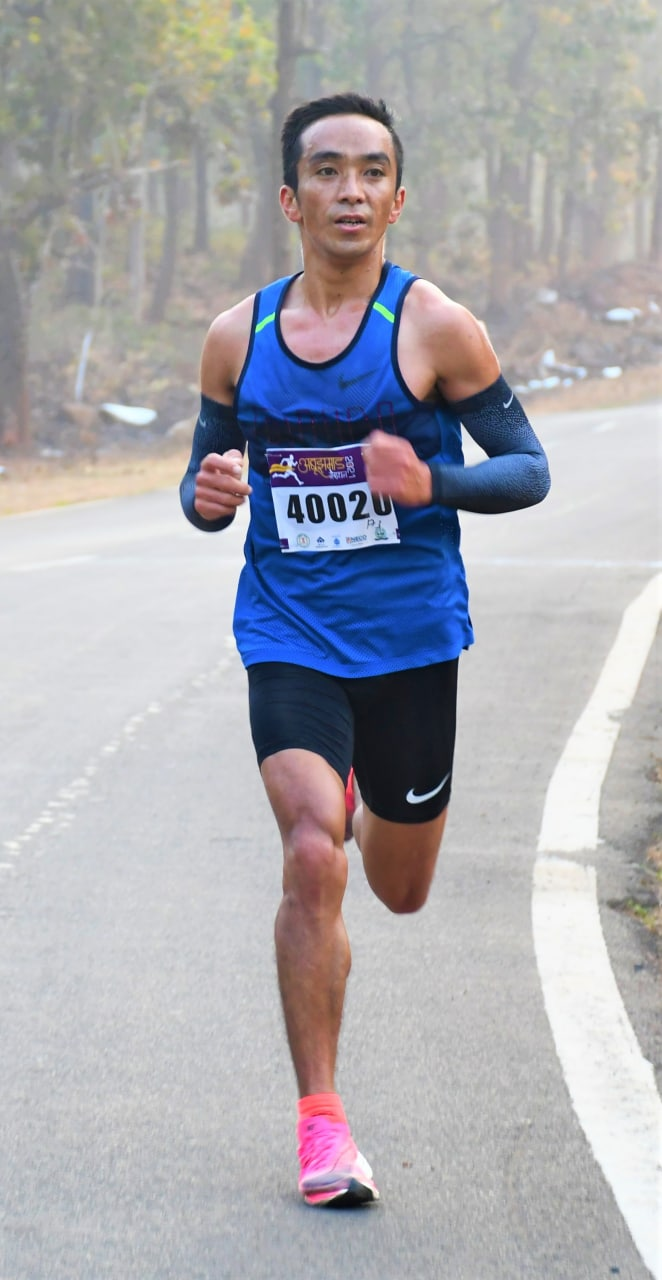
A.Thapa running at the Abujhmad Peace Marathon

The Abujhmad Peace Marathon is a joint initiative of the Narayanpur Police and the District Administration to foster peace and harmony in the Maoist-affected tribal area of Chhattisgarh.

Started in 2019, it is a 21-kilometre half marathon. The course begins at the High School Grounds in Narayanpur and ends at the ITBP camp in village Basingbahar, Orchha block, Narayanpur district. It is generally held every year in January or February. The marathon is the largest sports event in the Bastar area. Bicycle rallies and wall-painting competitions are organised to promote the Marathon amongst the local residents.

The fourth season of the Marathon was held on 27 March 2022.

== Past Results ==
| Edition | Year | Men's winner | Women's winner |
|---|---|---|---|
| 1st | 2019 | Mozes Kibor | Dimple |
| 2nd | 2020 | Shanker Maan Thapa | Alisa |
| 3rd | 2021 | Aneesh Thapa | Kumari Reenu |
