= Vinod Gowda =

Indian Maoist insurgent (1978–2024)

- Born: 1978; Hebri, Karnataka, India
- Died: 18 November 2024 (aged 45); Karnataka, India
- Cause of death: Gunshot wound
- Organization: Communist Party of India (Maoist)
- Known for: Leader of Nadukani dalam
- Criminal charges: Left-wing extremism, Murder, Criminal Conspiracy
- Criminal status: Killed in Encounter

Vinod Gowda (1978 – 18 November 2024) was an Indian Naxalite-Maoist commander and member of Communist Party of India (Maoist). He served as the overall chief and head of leftover left-wing activities in southern India, after most of Naxalite presence was defeated.

== Early life and education ==
Vikram Gowda belonged to the Malekudiya tribal community Hebri taluk in Udupi district, Karnataka. He dropped out of school at class 4th and worked as a waiter in Mumbai in most of teenage life.

His parents are Venkayya Gowda and Gulabi Gowda, he was the eldest of four siblings in his family.

== Guerrilla life ==
He returned to his village in 1990s and actively participated in protests against the Kudremukh National park formation which will lead to many tribal families including his being evicted from their land.

He began in his Maoist career from 1998 initially as a supply courier person but quickly rose through ranks of the group. From 2003 he became the leader of the Nadukani dalam, a group of Maoists active in the forests of Kerala, Tamil nadu and Karnataka, and had a series of crimes including extortion, murder and looting.

He had 114 cases pending against him, including three murder cases and had a total bounty of ₹5,50,000 in Kerala and Karnataka.

== Death ==
He was killed in an encounter with Anti-naxal squad on 18 November 2024 in Udupi district, Karnataka.

== See also ==
- Timeline of the Naxalite–Maoist insurgency
