= 2024 Kanker clash =

Maoist attack in India

- Part of the Naxalite-Maoist insurgency
- Location of Kanker district
Date	16 April 2024
Location	Kanker district, Chhattisgarh, India
Result	Indian victory • Maoist activity greatly suppressed

Belligerents
Communist Party of India (Maoist)	India

Commanders and leaders
Shankar Rao †; Vinod Gawde †; Lalitha †	(India) Nitin Agarwal (India) Ashok Juneja

Units involved
Unknown	Border Security Force; District Reserve Guard

Strength
29+	Unknown

Casualties and losses
29 killed	3 injured

The 2024 Kanker clash was an encounter between cadres of the Communist Party of India (Maoist) and Indian security forces in the Kanker district of Chhattisgarh. It was one of deadliest encounters of the insurgency resulting in the deaths of 29 Maoists, of which 15 were women. Government sources claim the clash was the result of patrols, a statement from the People’s Liberation Guerilla Army, the party's armed wing, claimed the encounter was an ambush, with 17 of the dead having been caputred and then killed or left to die from their injuries.

== Background ==
Anti-Maoists operations were ongoing in the area in relation to the 2024 Indian general election, due to boycotts and threats to attack polling stations.

== Clash ==
Police reports stated that units of Border Security Forces and District Reserve Guards were patrolling forest near the village of Binagund, Kanker district, when they were attacked by Maoists. After a heavy exchange of gunfire, security forces recovered the bodies of 29 Maoists along with, twenty-two weapons, including one AK-47 rifle, two INSAS rifles, one Self-Loading Rifle (SLR), one carbine, three .303 rifles, two .315 bore rifles, two 9MM pistols, two country-made launchers, eight muzzle loading guns, one country-made hand grenade and a cache of ammunition was recovered from the encounter site.

Among those killed was Shankar Rao (1984 – 16 April 2024), a CPI(Maoist) divisional committee member, who had a ₹25 lakh (equivalent to ₹27 lakh or US$28,000 in 2026) bounty upon him. Three security force personnel were injured, two of whom had non-life-threatening injuries.

== Aftermath ==
A statement released by the People’s Liberation Guerilla Army, claimed that of the 29 killed, only 12 had died during the clash and 17 were “murdered” by security forces who had been captured after the clash or left to die from injuries.

State and national government officials claimed the encounter as one of the most successful anti-Naxal operations in years. Police rejected claims made by the PLGA as "false and absurd".

== See also ==
- 2024 Abujhmarh clash
- 2025 Bijapur clash
- 2025 Abujhmarh clash
