= 2023 Dantewada bombing =

2023 terrorist attack

- Part of the Naxalite–Maoist insurgency
Date	26 April 2023
Location	Aranpur, Dantewada district, Chhattisgarh, India
Result	Maoist attack successful

Belligerents
Chhattisgarh Police	Communist Party of India (Maoist)

Strength
10 policemen and their driver	Unknown

Casualties and losses
10 policemen and a civilian driver killed	Unknown

On 26 April 2023, a blast took place in the Indian state of Chhattisgarh's Dantewada district. While they were returning from an anti-Maoist operation undertaken based on intelligence inputs, a party of ten policemen and their driver who were members of the District Reserve Guard (DRG) of Chhattisgarh Police were killed in a blast caused by an improvised explosive device (IED) detonated by Naxals. The incident happened in the Dantewada neighborhood of the Aranpur police station.

== Background ==
For more than 60 years, the Maoists, also known as the Naxals, have waged an armed insurrection against the Indian government. They contend that they are fighting for the most vulnerable people, who they claim have been left out of the nation's economic development. Since asserting control over extensive tracts of terrain in central and eastern India, the group has been regarded as the greatest threat to the nation's internal security, creating a so-called "red corridor." They conduct their operations against the Indian government and army out of dense forests in a covert manner.

== Attack ==
After learning that there were Naxalites in the Aranpur neighborhood of Dantewada, the DRG forces went there. They were engaged in a local anti-Maoist operation. The Maoists attacked their vehicle with an IED attack as they were leaving the region. The vehicle's return route had been the one where the explosives had been placed. Ten DRG employees and their driver died as a result of the attack.

== Aftermath ==
Chhattisgarh Chief Minister Bhupesh Baghel responded to the event by sending his sympathies to the victims' families and denouncing the assault. Additionally, he tweeted that the attack on DRG jawans was regrettable and that everyone should show respect for the deceased. Following the attack, Chief Minister Bhupesh Baghel called Union Home Minister Amit Shah, who assured him of all possible assistance.
