= Vinod Chaubey =

Indian police officer

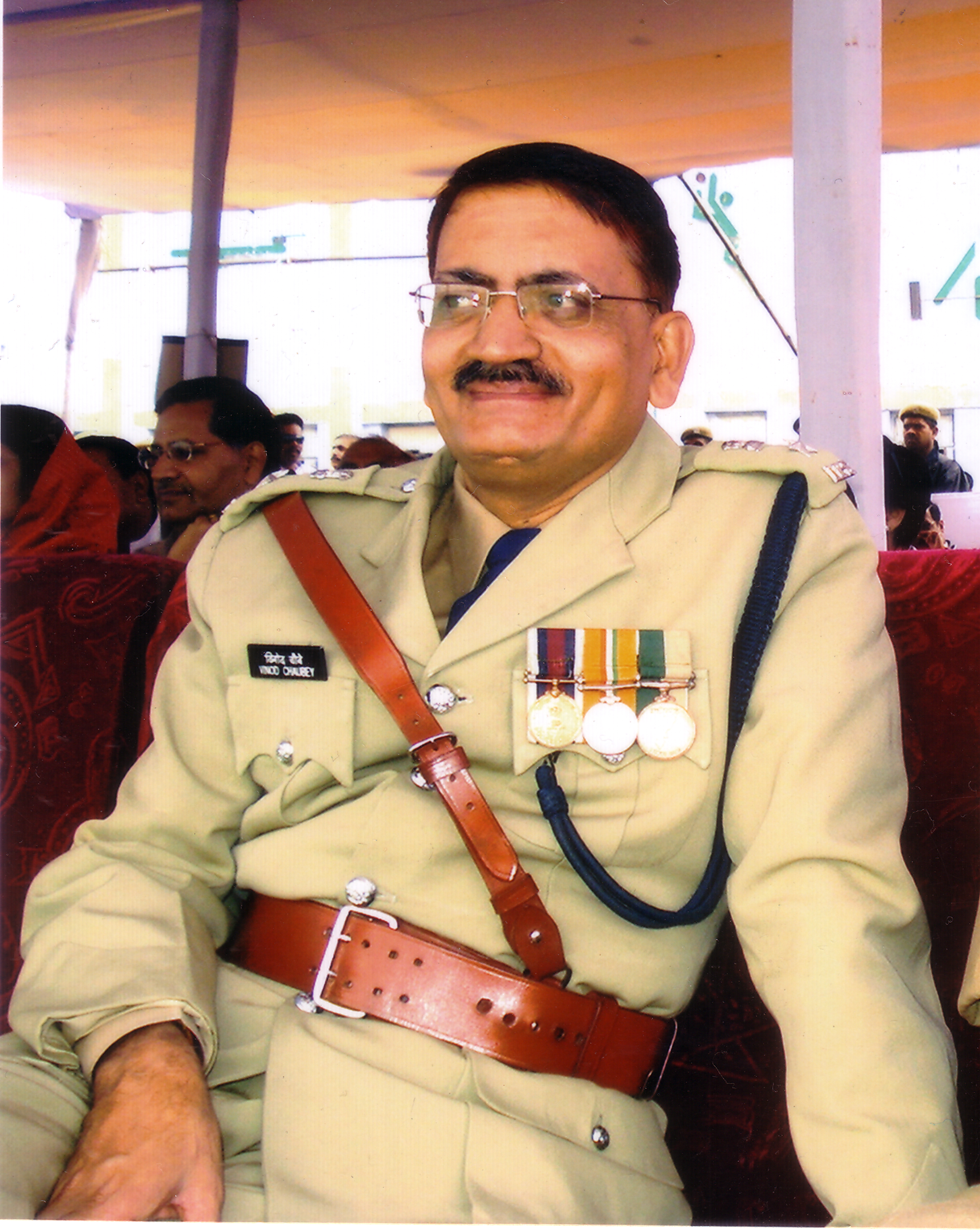
Vinod Choubey

Vinod Kumar Choubey, KC was an Indian Police Service officer who was killed during the Rajnandgaon ambush in July 2009, carried out by Maoist Naxalites. He became the first Indian Police Service officer in the state of Chhattisgarh to die as a result of Naxal violence. Choubey was posthumously awarded the peacetime gallantry award "Kirti Chakra" by then President of India Pratibha Devi Singh Patil.

== Early life ==
Choubey was born to Kamla Devi Choubey and Dwaraka Prasad Choubey, a senior journalist who worked for a Nagpur-based English daily before starting his own newspaper, 'Bilaspur Times'. Choubey was a lecturer of chemistry at the Girls PG College in Bilaspur before joining the state police service of undivided Madhya Pradesh as a Deputy Superintendent (D.S.P.) in 1983. In 1996, he was selected for the Indian Police Service.

== Police career ==
Choubey served as Superintendent of Police in the districts of Balrampur, Raipur, Surguja and North Bastar before being posted as Superintendent of Police, Rajnandgaon. While posted at District Balrampur in 2003, he was shot and injured by Maoists in Balrampur, bordering Jharkhand. Later, as SP, Kanker, he survived a Naxalite ambush in the state's tribal Bastar region. He received President's medal for distinguished services in 2003.

Choubey is known to have unearthed a Naxal urban network in the cities of Raipur and Bhilai in 2008, which led to several arrests and confiscation of arms. As a result of these actions, it is claimed that he was once considered a major threat by the insurgents and thus was a priority target.

== Rajnandgaon ambush ==
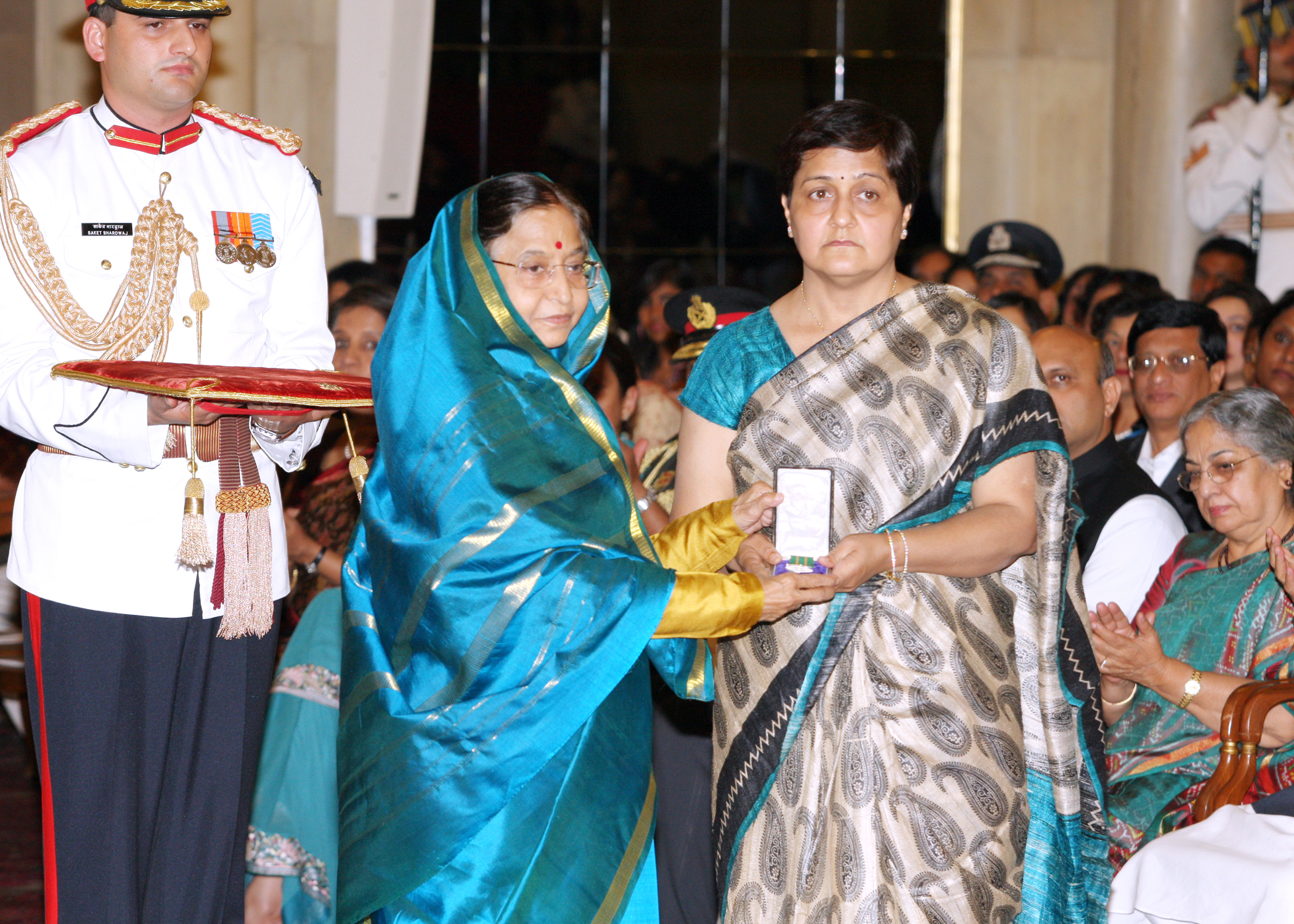
Ranjana Chaubey, wife of late Vinod Choubey receiving Kirti Chakra (Award) from President of India on her husband's behalf.

While posted as Superintendent of Police, Rajnandgaon, Chhattisgarh on 12 July 2009 he received a message that Naxalites had attacked the Madanwara outpost of PS Manpur, District Rajnandgaon and killed two policemen. He left for the location along with his force. En route, his caravan was fired upon by Naxalites, injuring his driver. Choubey then took control of the vehicle and took the injured driver to safety. After regrouping and clearing fresh road blocks set up by Naxalites, he arrived at a location where a fierce encounter ensued. He then counterattacked from his position which hit the Naxalite right flank thus forcing them to pull back. A transport bus of civilians which had entered amidst the ambush was also rescued to safety. About 300 Naxalites came from the forest firing fiercely. Many climbed trees and threw grenades at the police party. The police were caught in a precarious situation and were exposed in the open without cover. Choubey then decided to counter attack, he moved from his position towards the Naxalites in the trenches 10 meters away and fired at them, but was hit by a bullet and finally succumbed to his injuries.

Choubey received the peacetime gallantry award Kirti Chakra.
