= A. N. Upadhyay =

Director General of Police of Chhattisgarh

A. N. Upadhyay is a former Director General of Police of Chhattisgarh. He was also the Chairman-cum-Managing Director of the Police Housing Corporation.
