= Jhulna =

Jhulna is a village in Bemetara district of Chhattisgarh state of India.
