= Chalpathi =

Indian Maoist insurgent (1965–2025)

- Born: Ramachandra Reddy Gari Pratap Reddy; 18 January 1965; Matempaipally, Chittoor district, Andhra Pradesh, India
- Died: 21 January 2025 (aged 60); Gariaband district, Chhattisgarh, India
- Cause of death: Shootout with Anti-naxal squad
- Organization: Communist Party of India (Maoist)
- Known for: Head of Odisha State Committee of the Communist Party of India (Maoist)
- Criminal charges: Left wing extremism, Murder, Criminal Conspiracy
- Criminal status: Killed in Encounter

Ramachandra Reddy Gari Pratap Reddy, commonly known by his nom de guerre Chalpathi (otherwise spelt Chalpathy) was an Indian Maoist militant and chief of Odisha state committee of the Communist Party of India (Maoist).

== Early life ==
He was born in Matempaipally village in Chittoor, Andhra Pradesh, as Pratap Reddy Ramachandra Reddy. He also had many other names — Chalapathi, Appa Rao and Jayaram.

Around 1991, he joined then-People's War Group after being radicalised by rural poverty, exploitation by landlords, and through radical left ideologies.

== Personal life ==
He was married to a Senior Maoist named Aruna, who was a member of Andhra-Odish special Zonal Committee.

On 18 June 2025, Aruna was killed by Greyhounds Forces in an operation in Alluri Sitarama district, Andhra Pradesh.

== Guerrilla life ==
In 2004, he became member of the Communist Party of India (Maoist) when different Maoist groups merged to form a united group. He was also a member of Central committee of the group which was the highest decision-making body of the group.

In 2008, he was involved in the attack on a police armoury in Odisha's Nayagarh, in which 13 Security personnel were killed and armoury looted by Maoist cadres. He also cut down trees along highway to ensure that reinforcements could not reach the area.

In 2018, he was responsible for the attack in Dumbriguda Mandal in Andhra Pradesh, where Maoists killed TDP MLA Kidari Sarveswara Rao and former TDP MLA Siveri Soma. He reportedly had a bounty of ₹1 crore placed by the government at the time of his death.

== Death ==
On 21 January 2025, Security forces got a tip off about his presence near Kularighat reserve forest in Gariaband district in Chhattisgarh 5 km from Odisha border. A fierce gunfight erupted between his associate militants and Security forces and he along with 13 other militants were killed in the gunfight.
