= District Reserve Guard =

District Reserve Guard डिस्ट्रिक्ट रिजर्व गार्ड

Agency overview
- Formed: 2008
- Employees: Approximately 3,500 (as of 2021)
- Legal personality: Governmental agency

Jurisdictional structure
- Federal agency (Operations jurisdiction): India
- Operations jurisdiction: Chhattisgarh, India
- Legal jurisdiction: Chhattisgarh, India
- Governing body: Chhattisgarh Police
- General nature: Federal law enforcement

Operational structure
- Headquarters: Chhattisgarh, India
- Parent agency: Chhattisgarh Police

The District Reserve Guard (DRG), also known as the District Reserve Group, is a specialized police unit formed in 2008 in the Indian state of Chhattisgarh to address left-wing extremism, particularly the Maoist insurgency. The unit was established as a response to the growing influence and violence of Maoist groups, which have historically taken advantage of the socio-economic conditions of local tribal populations. The DRG is often referred to as the "son of the soil" due to its composition of local recruits. As of 2021, the DRG consists of approximately 3,500 personnel.

The DRG played a key role in neutralising Nambala Keshava Rao, who was then the General Secretary of the CPI (Maoist).

== History ==
The unit was initially set up in the Kanker and Narayanpur districts in 2008. In 2013, the force was expanded to the Bijapur and Bastar districts, followed by deployments in Sukma and Kondagaon in 2014, and in Dantewada in 2015. The DRG was created to utilize local knowledge for effective counter-insurgency efforts.

The DRG has been involved in various operations targeting Maoist networks. In 2015, it conducted 644 anti-Naxal operations, both independently and with other state and paramilitary forces, resulting in the deaths of 46 Maoist combatants. By mid-2018, 144 operations conducted by the DRG led to 25 Maoist fatalities without casualties among security forces.

As of 2018, the DRG's deployment included 482 personnel in Sukma, one of the most heavily affected districts, and 312 in the adjacent Bijapur district.

The 2023 Dantewada bombing, a Maoist attack in Dantewada district on 26 April, killed 10 DRG personnel and a civilian driver. Five of the ten DRG personnel killed in the attack were former Maoists. It was the first major casualties for the DRG in the Bastar region.

In September 2023, a joint operation by the District Reserve Guard and the Central Reserve Police Force killed nine Maoists during an encounter in the Dantewada district. In October 2023, security forces, including the DRG and Special Task Force, killed 28 Maoists in an operation in Dantewada's Abujhmad region following intelligence reports.

On 6 January 2025, a Naxalite attack in Bijapur, Chhattisgarh, killed nine people, including eight police personnel of District Reserve Guard and a civilian driver, using an IED weighing 60–70 kg. It was the largest attack on security forces in the state in two years.

On 21 May 2025 Abujhmarh clash, four units of the District Reserve Guard (DRG) killed CPI (Maoist) General Secretary Nambala Keshava Rao.

== Danteshwari Ladake ==
Danteshwari Ladake दंतेश्वरी लड़ाके

Agency overview
- Formed: 2019
- Employees: 97 (as of March 2024)

Jurisdictional structure
- Federal agency (Operations jurisdiction): India
- Operations jurisdiction: India
- Legal jurisdiction: Chhattisgarh
- Governing body: Chhattisgarh Police
- General nature: Federal law enforcement

Operational structure
- Headquarters: Dantewada, Chhattisgarh, India
- Parent agency: District Reserve Guard (DRG)

Danteshwari Ladake (Danteshwari Fighters) is an all-women commando unit within the District Reserve Guard, established in 2019 to support anti-Maoist-Naxal operations. It is named after the Danteshwari Temple in Dantewada and the unit includes 97 members as of March 2024.

Apart from combat duties, Danteshwari Ladake commandos are trained in basic medical care and conduct health visits in remote villages. Danteshwari Ladake occasionally operate in civilian clothing to conduct surveillance, concealing weapons under traditional attire for discreet reconnaissance missions.

== Recruitment ==
The DRG recruits primarily from local tribal communities. The DRG recruits personnel at three levels such as assistant constables, constables, and secret operatives. Assistant constables are often former Special Police Officers from the disbanded Salwa Judum and former Maoists. Constables are formally recruited, while surrendered Maoists are enlisted as "gopniya sainiks" or secret operatives.

== Training ==
DRG personnel undergo training to prepare for counter-insurgency tasks. This includes advanced training at army camps outside the state and foundational jungle warfare training at the Greyhounds facility in Andhra Pradesh.

The Kanker-based Counter Terrorism and Jungle Warfare College is responsible for training DRG personnel.

Training Programs Include

- A one-year course at the state police academy.
- A two-month specialized jungle warfare course in Kanker.
- Instruction in guerrilla warfare tactics and the use of modern weaponry.

== Criticism ==
Concerns have been raised about the District Reserve Guard, including reports of misconduct by some personnel. The unit recruits personnel from tribal communities has led to questions regarding the training and professionalism of recruits. There have also been occasional tensions between DRG members and other police units. There have been allegations that DRG personnel are involved in looting and indiscriminate beatings in certain villages.

Soni Sori, an Aam Aadmi Party leader, has stated that surrendered Maoists are joining the police due to limited job opportunities and criticized the formation of specialized units like the District Reserve Guard, suggesting it involves adivasis (tribal) fighting against other adivasis.

Tribal rights activists and civil society groups have raised concerns about alleged extrajudicial actions by the District Reserve Guard Force of the Chhattisgarh Police, likening the DRG to the banned Salwa Judum.
