= Chhattisgarh Police =

State Police force in India

Chhattisgarh Police छत्तीसगढ़ पुलिस
- Insignia
- Common name: CG Police
- Motto: (Sanskrit) परित्राणाय साधुनाम् Paritranay Sadhunaam; To protect the good people

Agency overview
- Formed: 2000
- Preceding agency: Madhya Pradesh Police

Jurisdictional structure
- Operations jurisdiction: Chhattisgarh, IN
- Map of Chhattisgarh Police's jurisdiction
- Area: 135,192 km2
- Population: 30 Million
- Legal jurisdiction: Chhattisgarh
- Governing body: Government of Chhattisgarh
- General nature: Local civilian police

Operational structure
- Overseen by: Ministry of Home Affairs of Chhattisgarh
- Headquarters: Naya Raipur
- Agency executive: Arun Deo Gautam, IPS, Director General of Police
- Child agency: Chhattisgar State Cyber Police • Special Task Force • Danteshwari Ladake • District Reserve Guard • Bastar Fighter Force.

Website
- www.cgpolice.gov.in

The Chhattisgarh Police is the law enforcement agency for the state of Chhattisgarh in India. The agency is administered by the Department of Home Affairs of the Government of Chhattisgarh. The force has specialized units to fight the Naxalite–Maoist insurgency in some districts of the state.

== Units ==
- Special Task Force was raised in the year 2007 for battling Maoist insurgents in Chhattisgarh. Headquartered in Baghera of Durg district, the force has hubs coming up in the districts of Kanker, Sukma, Bijapur and Bastar.
- District Reserve Guard was formed by recruiting local tribal boys to counter the Naxals.
  - Danteshwari Ladake, women commando unit of District Reserve Guard.
  - Bastar Fighter Force.

== Training ==
The police officers are trained at the State Police Academy at Chandkhuri near Raipur.

== Weaponry ==
Name	Country of origin	Type	Status
JVPC	India	Submachine gun	
INSAS	India	Rifle	

== See also ==
- A. N. Upadhyay - former DGP of Chhattisgarh Police
