= Narayanpur district =

Coordinates: 19°43′N 81°15′E

- District of Chhattisgarh
- Location in Chhattisgarh
- Country: India
- State: Chhattisgarh
- Division: Bastar
- Headquarters: Narayanpur, Chhattisgarh

Government
  - District Collector: Namrata Jain (I.A.S.),

Area
  - Total: 4,653 km^{2} (1,797 sq mi)

Population (2011)
  - Total: 139,820
  - Density: 30.05/km^{2} (77.83/sq mi)

Demographics
  - Literacy: 49.59
- Time zone: UTC+05:30 (IST)
- PIN: 494xxx (Narayanpur)
- Website: narayanpur.gov.in

Narayanpur district is one of the 33 districts of the Indian state of Chhattisgarh. It is one of the two districts created on 11 May, 2007. It was carved out of the erstwhile Bastar district. This district covers an area of 6640 km^{2} and it had a population of 110,800 in 2001. Narayanpur town is the administrative headquarters of this district. This district comprises 366 villages. It is currently a part of the Red Corridor.

As of 2011, it is the least populous district of Chhattisgarh (out of 18).

The present district collector and magistrate of Narayanpur is Ms Namrata Jain, IAS.

Jagdalpur is the nearest major town to Narayanpur and it is around 120 km away. National highway is situated at a distance of around 50 km from Narayanpur. Nearest railway stations to Narayanpur, from where interstate trains run are Jagadalpur and Rajnandgaon and they are located at a distance of 120 km and 180 km respectively.

Being a part of Bastar division with a large presence of Naxalite insurgents, transportation and medical facilities are the two major concerns for people who live here.

Abujhmad Peace Marathon is the largest sports event of Narainpur. State Bank of India has opened its branch in 1977 to provide financial services to the people of Narainpur.

Ramkrishna Mission Football Academy of Narayanpur has been dominating the Chhattisgarh State Football League and was champion in 2022. They represented Chhattisgarh in I League 2 2022-23.

== Demographics ==
Historical population
Year	Pop.	±% p.a.
1901	16,312	—
1911	22,289	+3.17%
1921	23,437	+0.50%
1931	26,280	+1.15%
1941	31,153	+1.72%
1951	36,338	+1.55%
1961	45,912	+2.37%
1971	57,533	+2.28%
1981	73,800	+2.52%
1991	95,071	+2.56%
2001	117,337	+2.13%
2011	139,820	+1.77%

According to the 2011 census Narayanpur district has a population of 139,820, roughly equal to the nation of Saint Lucia. This gives it a ranking of 606th in India (out of a total of 640). The district has a population density of 20 inhabitants per square kilometre (52/sq mi) . Its population growth rate over the decade 2001-2011 was 19.49%. Narayanpur has a sex ratio of 998 females for every 1000 males, and a literacy rate of 49.59%. Scheduled Castes and Scheduled Tribes make up 3.56% and 77.36% of the population respectively.

Religions in Narayanpur district (2011)
Religion	Percent
Hinduism	92.38%
Other (Tribal religion)	6.11%
Islam	0.55%
Christianity	0.42%
Other or not stated	0.54%

92.38% of the population stated their religion as Hinduism. 6.11% other (tribal faiths) and 0.55% Muslims.

Languages of Nayaranpur district (2011)
1. Gondi (53.9%)
2. Halbi (18.1%)
3. Santali (11.3%)
4. Chhattisgarhi (9.08%)
5. Hindi (4.05%)
6. Bengali (1.27%)
7. Others (2.21%)

At the time of the 2011 Census of India, 53.90% of the population in the district spoke Gondi, 18.14% Halbi, 11.35% Santali, 9.08% Chhattisgarhi, 4.05% Hindi, and 1.27% Bengali as their first language.

== Geography ==
Narayanpur District is divided into two administrative blocks:

1. Narayanpur, having 45 Graama Panchayats with 176 villages (172 inhabited), is spread over an area of 2760 km^{2}.
2. Orchha, having 24 Gram Panchayats with 237 villages (209 inhabited), is spread over an area of 3880 km^{2}.

Orchha comprises the Abujhmad region, the unsurveyed zone in central India and home to Primitive Tribal Group Madia Gond and Muriya Gond.

Narayanpur receives an average annual rainfall of 1300 mm.

== Politics ==
Narayanpur is under Bastar Lok Sabha constituency, whose MP is Mahesh Kashyap from the Bharatiya Janta Party. The MLA from Narayanpur assembly constituency is Kedar Nath Kashyap from the Bharatiya Janta Party.

== Villages ==
- Jhulna suman kumar
