= Self-loading rifle =

Type of rifle

A self-loading rifle or auto-loading rifle is a rifle with an action using a portion of the energy of each cartridge fired to load another cartridge. Self-loading pistols are similar, but intended to be held and fired by a single hand, while rifles are designed to be held with both hands and fired from the shoulder. Self-loading rifles include semi-automatic rifles and automatic rifles.

== Evolution ==
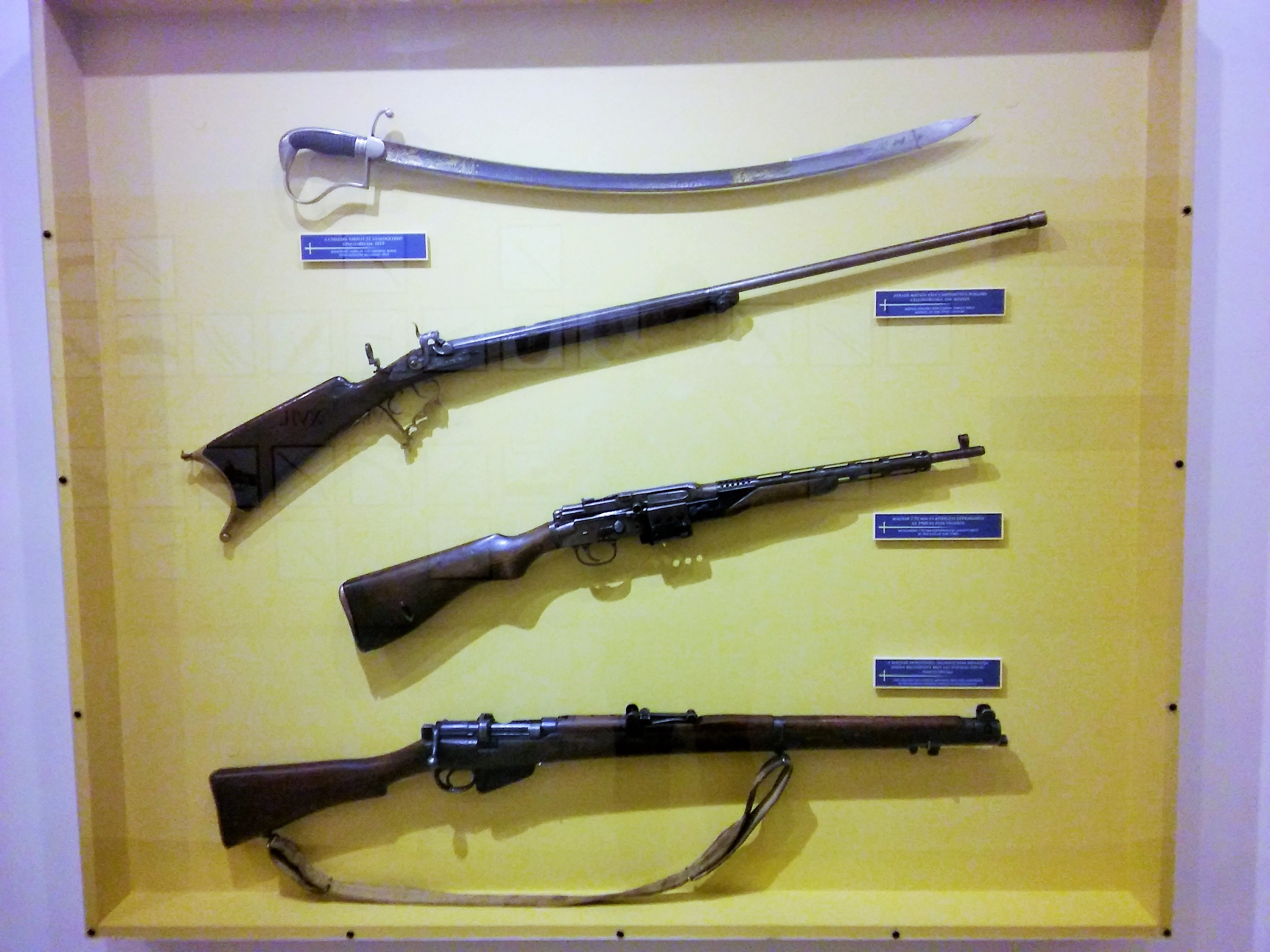
Prototype Hungarian 7.92×33mm assault rifle (center) compared to Matyas Zoller caplock (above) and Lee-Enfield bolt-action rifle (below) at the Hadtörténeti Múzeum Budapest

Early breech-loading firearms were single-shot devices holding a single cartridge. When that cartridge had been fired, the person using the firearm would remove the empty cartridge, find another cartridge from a pocket or other carrying apparatus, and load that cartridge into the firearm chamber before another shot could be fired. Later repeating rifles and pistols were equipped with a magazine holding several cartridges with a spring to push those cartridges into position to be loaded by manually operating the action of the firearm—as by a lever, bolt, or pump mechanism—thus avoiding the procedure of locating and manually positioning each new cartridge. Developed starting in the early 1900s, self-loading firearms avoid manual operation of the action by using the energy of the cartridge being fired to operate the action, so the shooter may fire additional cartridges without manually operating the firearm action until the magazine is empty.

== Variations ==
Self-loading rifles types include:

- Semi-automatic rifle, a type of firearm which fires a single shot with the pull of a trigger, and uses the energy of that shot to chamber the next round. Examples:
  - Remington Model 8
  - Winchester Model 1907
- Automatic rifle, a firearm that automatically loads and fires rounds, through the bullet's energy, as long as its trigger is held down. Examples:
  - Lewis gun
  - Bren light machine gun

Most automatic rifles feature selective-fire capability, meaning they can switch between both semi-automatic and fully automatic fire. Examples:

- M16 rifle
- AK-47

== See also ==
- Glossary of firearms terms
- Firearm components
- Firearm terminology
- Glossary of military abbreviations
- List of established military terms
