= Abujhmarh =

Forest in India

Coordinates: 19.540°N 80.806°E

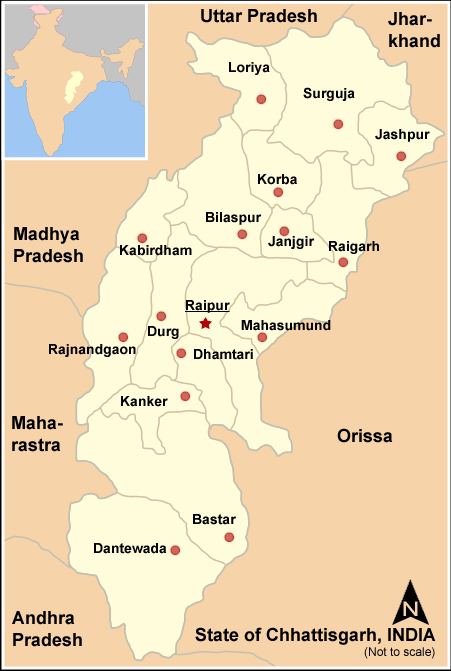
The western part of the Bastar division is Abujhmarh hills covering the bottom three districts (named Kanker, Bastar and Dantewada) in this old 2007 map of Chhattisgarh. Since then these 3 districts have been divided into more districts.

Abujhmarh is a hilly forest area, spread over 4,000 square kilometres (1,500 sq mi) in Chhattisgarh, covering Narayanpur district, Bijapur district and Dantewada district. It is home to the indigenous tribes of India, including the Gond, Muria, Abujhmarhia, Madiya, and Halba. It was only in 2009 that the Government of Chhattisgarh lifted the restriction on the entry of common people in the area imposed in the early 1980s. Geographically isolated and largely inaccessible, the area continues to show no physical presence of the civil administration, and is also known as a "liberated-zone" as it is an alleged hub of the Naxalite-Maoist insurgency, the banned Communist Party of India (Maoist) and its military wing, the People's Liberation Guerrilla Army (PLGA), who run a parallel government in the area.

In 2007, the area was proposed as a biosphere reserve by Ministry of Environment and Forests, Government of India.

== Etymology ==
The word abujhmarh means "the unknown hills" (abujh means 'unknown' and marh means 'hill') in the Gondi language native to the region.

Forest, about 92,000 square kilometres (36,000 sq mi) equivalent to the present Bastar division. Dandakaranya, literally meaning "the abode of the demon Dandaka", also finds mention in Hindu epic, Ramayana.

The dense forests of Abujhmarh have long been isolated from the outside world, inhabited largely by indigenous people, and accessible only via forest pathways starting from Narayanpur, Bijapur and Basroor. Geographically, the Indravati river segregates it from the Bastar region, adding to its isolation. Recently the access to the area has been further marred by heavy use of landmines by the insurgents at entry points. During the British rule in India, Abujhmarh remained in isolation and constitutionally "excluded", though a land survey was done in 1873. After the independence of India, its isolation continued, except when in 1958 the government resettled refugees from East Bengal in the Dandakaranya area in the present Bastar division, and later the hills started getting exploited for their mineral wealth, like the Bailadila Hills , which were excavated for their deposits of high-grade iron ore. The tribals remained backward and exploited by prevalent feudalism in India, the majority of them started cultivation only recently, and education was undertaken only at small schools run either by NGOs or missionaries. All these conditions, after 1967, gave rise to the Naxalite movement, which grew and spread over the coming decades.

Abujhmarh has been termed a "liberated zone", as due to its inaccessibility it has remained untouched by any government presence and civil administration for the past 60 years and has developed into a stronghold of Naxal-Maoist insurgents of the banned Communist Party of India (Maoist), which ran a parallel government, known as Janta Sarkar (People's government). Besides running its own military wing, People's Liberation Guerrilla Army (PLGA) and training camps, Maoists also run small irrigation projects, courts known as jan adalat (People's courts) and schools. The Times of India reported the existence of one such school, known as "Janta Sarkar Bhoomkaal School" at Metapada, where besides elementary education, the students were also taught Naxal ideologies. After being pushed out of Andhra Pradesh, post 2003, Naxals made these forests their hub, and even established a revenue generation system which includes land sharing, cooperative farming and running foodgrain and seed banks.

The state government had no records about the Muria tribes living in the region or land ownership or revenue records. Thereafter, nearly 132 years after the previous survey, in 2005, the Government of Chhattisgarh initiated a project to map the area through an aerial survey at the cost of ₹55 million (US$590,000). Prior to 2006 a permit was required to enter the area. In June 2009, after a nearly 30-year restriction on the entry of outsides into the area, imposed by then Government of Madhya Pradesh, triggered by a controversial documentary made by a foreign channel, the Government of Chhattisgarh, a state carved out of Madhya Pradesh in 2000, eased the restrictions.

On 19 May 2005, Naxals made a coordinated attack on two police outposts adjoining the hills, one at Chhota Dongar in Narayanpur and another at Dhau Dai, 8 km (5.0 mi) away; subsequently, senior police officials managing the response were trapped in Pharasgaon near Narayanpur and 6-hour gun-battle, later an army helicopter had to be called in for their rescue. The attacks revealed use of sophisticated communication instruments, landmines and coordination amongst the Naxals. The next big attack came on 18 March 2007, when the Maoists attacked a police camp at Ranibodli, killing 55 policemen, including Special Police Officers (SPOs). "Operation Green Hunt" was launched in area in April 2010, but on 7 April, in an ambush by People's Liberation Guerilla Army (PLGA), 76 security persons were killed in Chintalnar.

== Geography ==
This area of dense forest, mountains, and several rivers is spread over 4,000 square kilometres (1,500 sq mi), an area larger than the state of Goa. Known for its rich mineral deposits, it covers the Narayanpur district, Bijapur district and Dantewada district of Chhattisgarh state and is close to the borders of neighbouring Odisha, Andhra Pradesh and Maharashtra. The Indravati river, which originates from Odisha, and is a tributary of the Godavari River, separates the area from Bastar. Even today, most of the tribal villages in the area remain inaccessible for six months in a year.

In 2008, the Ministry of Environment and Forests, Government of India proposed to designate Abujhmarh as a biosphere reserve.

== Demographics ==
The area has population density of less than 4 inhabitants per square kilometre (10 inhabitants per square mile), and is home to nearly 27 per cent entire tribal population of the Chhattisgarh state, dominated by Gond, Muria, Abujhmarhia, Madiya and Halba tribes. A total population of 34,000 tribal inhabits 233 villages. As this area is largely uncharted, in 2009, satellite mapping of region was done by the Indian Space Research Organisation (ISRO) to locate villages.

== Economy ==
Majority of the tribals live under dire poverty, and survive of the traditional shifting cultivation or slash-and-burn—known locally as penda kheti—for six months in a year, they cultivate a small grained rice, korsa, and for the rest of the period survive by selling the rice along with forest products like tendu leaves, and occasionally come out to the weekly markets, haat bazaar of near by towns to sell their produce.

== See also ==
- Red corridor
