= List of villages in Krishna district =

The list below is for the undivided district before 4 June 2022. For the current list of villages see Category:Villages in Krishna district

Krishna district is located in the Coastal Andhra region of the state of the Indian state of Andhra Pradesh. The villages in the district are administered in 50 mandals.

Krishna district in Andhra Pradesh

== Mandal wise villages ==
As of 2011 census of India, the following are the villages in their respective mandals of Krishna district.

Source:Census India 2011 (sub districts)

Note:

- The villages data in the list is as per the 2011 census of India. All other villages and hamlets are not included.
- Vijayawada (urban) is a mandal which is completely under the urban body of Vijayawada municipal corporation and hence do not have any villages.

== A ==
#	A.Konduru mandal	Agiripalli mandal	Avanigadda mandal
1	A.Konduru	Adivinekkalam	Aswaraopalem
2	Atlapragada	Agiripalli	Avanigadda
3	Cheemalapadu	Ananthasagaram	Chiruvolu Lanka
4	Gollamandala	Boddanapalli	Edlanka
5	Kambampadu	Chopparametla	Modumudi
6	Koduru	Edara	Puligadda
7	Kummarakuntla	Edulagudem	Vekanuru
8	Madhavaram (East)	Kalaturu	Bandalai Cheruvu
9	Madhavaram (West)	Kanasanapalli	
10	Marepalli	Kommuru	
11	Polisettipadu	Krishnavaram	
12	Repudi	Malliboinapalli	
13	Vallampatla	Narasingapalem	
14		Nugondapalli	
15		Pinnamareddipalli	
16		Pothavarappadu	
17		Sagguru	
18		Suravaram	
19		Tadepalli	
20		Thotapalli	
21		Vadlamanu	
22		Vattigudipadu	

== B ==
#	Bantumilli mandal	Bapulapadu mandal
1	Amudalapalli	Ampapuram
2	Arthamuru	Arugolanu
3	Bantumilli	Bandarugudem
4	Barripadu	Bapulapadu
5	Chinatummidi	Billanapalli
6	Chorampudi	Bommuluru
7	Kanchadam	Bommuluru Khandrika
8	Korlapadu	Chirivada
9	Maddetipalli	Dantaguntla
10	Malleswaram	Kakulapadu
11	Manimeswaram	Kanumolu
12	Mulaparru	Kodurupadu
13	Munjuluru	Kothapalli
14	Narayanapuram	Koyyuru
15	Pedatummidi	Kuripirala
16	Pendurru	Madicherla
17	Ramavarapumodi	Mallavalli
18	Satuluru	Mallaparajugudem
19	Mallaparajugudem	Ramannagudem
20		Rangannagudem
21		Remalli
21		Serinarasannapalem
22		Singannagudem
23		Sobhanadripuram
24		Tippanagunta
25		Veeravalli
26		Veleru
27		Venkatrajugudem

== C ==
#	Challapalli mandal	Chandarlapadu mandal	Chatrai mandal
1	Challapalli	Bobbellapadu	Arugolanupeta
2	Lakshmipuram	Brahmabotlapalem	Burugugudem
3	Majeru	Chandarlapadu	Chanubanda
4	Mangalapuram	Chintalapadu	Chatrai
5	Nadakuduru	Eturu	Chinnampet
6	Nimmagadda	Gudimetla	Chittapur
7	Pagolu	Kasarabada	Janardhanavaram
8	Puritigadda	Kodavatikallu	Kotapadu
9	Vakkalagadda	Konayapalem	Kothagudem
10	Velivolu	Munagala Palle	Krishnaraopalem
11	Yarlagadda	Muppalla	Mankollu
12	Nukala Vaari Palem	Patempadu	Parvatapuram
13		Pokkunuru	Polavaram
14		Popuru	Pothanapalli
15		Punnavalli	Somavaram
16		Thotaravulapadu	Tummagudem
17		Thurlapadu	NarasimhaRaoPalem
18		Ustepalli	
19		Veladi	
20		Vibhareetapadu	

== G ==
#	G.Konduru mandal	Gampalagudem mandal	Gannavaram mandal	Ghantasala mandal
1	Atukuru	Anumollanka	Ajjampudi	Birudugadda
2	Bhimavarappadu	Arlapadu	Allapuram	Bollapadu
3	Chegireddipadu	Chennavaram	Bahubalendruni Gudem	Chilakalapudi
4	Cheruvu Madhavaram	Dundiralapadu	Balliparru	China Kallepalli
5	Chevuturu	Gampalagudem	Buddavaram	Chitturpu
6	Duggiralapadu	Gosaveedu	Buthumillipadu	Chitturu
7	Gaddamanugu	Gullapudi	Chikkavaram	Daliparru
8	Ganginenipalem	Kanumuru	China Avutapalli	Devarakota
9	Gurrajupalem	Konijerla	Gannavaram	Endakuduru
10	Haveli Mutyalampadu	Kothapalli	Gollanapalli	Ghantasala
11	Kandulapadu	Lingala	Gopavarapugudem	Kodali
12	Kavuluru	Meduru	Jakkulanekkalam	Kothapalli
13	Koduru	Narikampadu	Kesarapalli	Lankapalli
14	Konduru	Nemali	Kondapavuluru	Mallampalli
15	Kuntamukkala	Peda Komira	Metlapalli	Pushadam
16	Munagapadu	Penugolanu	Purushottapatnam	Srikakulam
17	Nandigama	Rajavaram	Ramachandrapuram	Tadepalli
18	Pinapaka	Tunikipadu	Sagguruamani	Teluguraopalem
19	Sunnampadu	Ummadidevarapalli	Savarigudem	V.Rudravaram
20	Telladevarapadu	Utukuru	Surampalli	Vemulapalli
21	Velagaleru	Vinagadapa	Tempalli	
22	Vellaturu		Vedurupavuluru	
23	Venkatapuram		Veerapanenigudem	
24			Venkatanarasimhapuram	

#	Gudivada mandal	Gudlavalleru mandal	Guduru mandal
1	Bethavolu (Rural)	Angaluru	Akulamannadu
2	Billapadu (Rural)	Chandrala	Akumarru
3	Bommuluru	Chinagonnuru	Chittiguduru
4	Chilakamudi	Chitram	Gandram
5	China Yerukapadu	Dokiparru	Guduru
6	Chirichintala	Gadepudi	Gurjepalli
7	Chowtapalli	Gudlavalleru	Idugullapalli
8	Dondapadu	Kowtaram	Jakkamcherla
9	Gangadharapuram	Kurada	Kalapatam
10	Gudivada (Rural)	Mamidikolla	Kanchakodur
11	Guntakoduru	Nagavaram	Kankatava
12	Kalvapudi Agraharam	Penjendra	Kappaladoddi
13	Kasipudi	Pesaramilli	Kokanarayanapalem
14	Lingavaram	Puritipadu	Lellagaruvu
15	Mandapadu (Rural)	Seri Kalavapudi	Maddipatla
16	Merakagudem	Seridaggumilli	Mallavolu
17	Moturu	Ulavalapudi	Mukkollu
18	Pedayerukapadu (Rural)	Vadlamannadu	Narikedalapalem
19	Ramachandrapuram	Vemavaram	Pinagudurulanka
20	Ramanapudi	Vemavarappalem	Polavaram
21	Saidepudi	Venuturumilli	Ramannapeta
22	Seepudi	Vinnakota	Ramanuja Varthalapalli
23	Seri Dintakurru		Ramarajupalem
24	Seri Golvepalli		Rayavaram
25	Seri Velpur		Tarakaturu
26	Siddhantam		
27	Tativarru		
28	Valivarthipadu (Rural)		
29	NAGAVARAPADU		

== I ==
#	Ibrahimpatnam, Krishna district
1	Chilukuru
2	Damuluru
3	Elaprolu
4	Gudurupadu
5	patha Jupudi
6	Kachavaram
7	Kethanakonda
8	Kotikalapudi
9	Malkapuram
10	Mulapadu
11	N.Pothavaram
12	Trilochanapuram
13	Tummalapalem
14	Zami Machavaram
15	Zami Navi Pothavaram
16	Kilesapuram

== J ==
#	Jaggayyapeta mandal
1	Annavaram
2	Anumanchipalli
3	Balusupadu
4	Bandipalem
5	Buchavaram
6	Budawada
7	Chillakallu
8	Gandrai
9	Garikapadu
10	Gowravaram
11	Jayanthipuram
12	Kowthavari Agraharam
13	Malkapuram
14	Mukteswarapuram
15	Pochampalli
16	Ramachandrunipeta
17	Ravirala
18	Shermohammedpet
19	Takkellapadu
20	Tirumalagiri
21	Torraguntapalem
22	Tripuravaram
23	Vedadri

== K ==
#	Kaikalur mandal	Kalidindi mandal	Kanchikacherla mandal	Kankipadu mandal	Koduru mandal	Kruthivennu mandal
1	Achavaram	Amaravathi	Bathinapadu	Chalivendrapalem	Koduru	Chandala
2	Alapadu	Avakuru	Chevitikallu	Davuluru	Hamsaladeevi	Cherkumilli
3	Atapaka	Kalidindi	Gandepalli	Edupugallu	Machavaram	China Pandraka
4	Bhujabalapatnam	Kallapalem	Ganiatukuru	Godavarru	Mandapakala	Chinagollapalem
5	Doddipatla	Kondangi	Kanchikacherla	Gottumukkala	Jagannadhapuram	Pittallanka
6	Gonepadu	Konduru	Kanchikacherla	Kandalampadu	Ramakrishnapuram	Garisepudi
7	Gopavaram	Korukollu	Keesara	Kankipadu	Salempalem	Interu
8	Kaikalur	Kotcherla	Kunikinapadu	Kolavennu	Ullipalem	Komallapudi
9	Kolletikota	Mattagunta	Moguluru	Konathanapadu	Viswanadhapalli	Kruthivennu
10	Kottada	Pedalanka	Munnaluru	Kunderu	Lingareddypalem	Laxmipuram
11	Pallevada	Pothumarru	Paritala	Madduru	Paadhalavaripalem	Matlam
12	Penchikalamarru	Sana Rudravaram	Pendyala	Manthena	Palakayatippa	Munipeda
13	Rachapatnam	Thadinada	Perakalapadu	Maredumaka	Jayapuram	Neelipudi
14	Ramavaram	Venkatapuram	Seri Amaravaram	Neppalli	Narasimhapuram	Nidamarru
15	Seetanapalli	Maddavanigudem	Vemulapalli	Prodduturu	Kothapalem	Tadivennu
16	Peethalava	Gurvaipalem	Singapuram	Punadipadu		Punadipadu
17	Someswaram		Kothapeta	Tenneru		Endapalli
18	Syamalambapuram			Uppaluru		
19	Tamarakollu			Velpuru		
20	Vadarlapadu					
21	Varahapatnam					
22	Vemavarappadu					
23	Vinjaram					

== M ==
#	Machilipatnam mandal	Mandavalli mandal	Mopidevi mandal	Movva mandal
1	Arisepalle	Appapuram	Annavaram	Avurupudi
2	Bhogireddipalle	Ayyavari Rudravaram	Ayodhya	Ayyanki
3	Borrapothupalem	Bhyravapatnam	Bobbarlanka	Barlapudi
4	Buddalapalem	Chavalipadu	Chiruvolu	Bhatla Penumarru
5	Chilakalapudi (Rural)	Chintalapudi	Kaptanupalem	Chinamuttevi
6	Chinnapuram	Chintapadu	Kokkiligadda	Gudapadu
7	Gokavaram	Dayyampadu	Mellamarru	Kaza
8	Gopuvanipalem	Gannavaram	Mellamarthi Lanka	Kosuru
9	Gundupalem	Ingilipakalanka	Merakanapalli	Kuchipudi
10	Hussainpalem	Kanukollu	Mopidevi Bodagunta	Movva
11	Kanuru	Kovvadalanka	Mopidevi Lanka	Nidumolu
12	Kara Agraharam	Lellapudi	Nagayatippa	Palankipadu
13	Kona	Lingala	North Chiruvolulanka	Pedamuttevi
14	Kothapudi	Lokamudi	Pedakallepalli	Pedapudi
15	Machavaram (rural)	Mandavalli	Pedaprolu	Pedasanagallu
16	Machilipatnam (rural)	Manugunuru	Tekupalli	Vemulamada
17	Manginapudi	Mokhasakalvapudi	Venkatapuram	Yaddanapudi
18	Nelakurru	Muduthallapadu	KosuruVariPalem	
19	Palletummalapalem	Nandigamalanka		
20	Pedapatnam	Nutchumilli		
21	Pedayadara	Pasalapudi		
22	Polatitippa	Penumakalanka		
23	Pothepalli	Perikegudem		
24	Potlapalem	Pillipadu		
25	Rudravaram	Prathipadu		
26	Sultannagaram Gollapalem	Pulaparru		
27	Tallapalem	Putlacheruvu		
28	Tavisipudi	Singanapudi		
29		Sobhanadripuram		
30		Thakkellapadu		
31		Unikili		

#	Mudinepalli mandal	Musunuru mandal	Mylavaram mandal
1	Alluru	Akkireddigudem	Chandragudem
2	Apparaopeta		
3	Bomminampadu	Balive	Chandrala
4	Chevuru	Chakkapalli	Dasullapalem
5	Chigurukota	Chillaboyinapalli	Ganapavaram
6	China Kamanapudi	Chintalavalli	Jangalapalli
7	Chinapalaparru	Ellapuram	Kanimerla
8	Dakaram	Gopavaram	Keerthirayanigudem
9	Devapudi	Gullapudi	Morusumilli
10	Devaram	Katrenipadu	Mulakalapanta
11	Edepalli	Korlagunta	Mylavaram
12	Gokinampadu	Lopudi	Pondugula
13	Guraja	Musunuru	Pulluru
14	Kakaravada	Ramanakkapeta	Sabjapadu
15	Koduru	Surepalli	T.Gannavaram
16	Komarru	Tallavalli	Tholukodu
17	Korraguntapalem	Velpucherla	Vedurubeedem
18	Mudinepalli		Velvadam
19	Mulakalapalli		
20	Peda Kamanapudi		
21	Pedagonnuru		
22	Pedapalaparru		
23	Penumalli		
24	Peruru		
25	Peyyeru		
26	Prodduvaka		
27	Sankarshana Puram		
28	Singarayapalem		
29	Utukuru		
30	Vadali		
31	Vadavalli		
32	Vaivaka		
33	Vaivaka		

== N ==
#	Nagayalanka mandal	Nandigama mandal	Nandivada mandal	Nuzvid mandal
1	Bhavadevarapalle	Adiviravulapadu	Anamanapudi	Annavaram
2	Chodavaram	Ambarupeta	Aripirala	Bathulavarigudem
3	Edurumondi	Chandapuram	Chedurthipadu	Boravancha
4	Etimoga	Damuluru	Chinalingala	Devaragunta
5	Ganapeswaram	Gollamudi	Dandiganapudi	Digavalli
6	Kammanamolu	Ithavaram	Gandepudi	Enamadala
7	Nagayalanka	Jonnalagadda	Ilaparru	Gollapalli
8	Nangegadda	Kanchela	Janardhanapuram	Hanumanthunigudem
9	Parrachivara	Kethaveeruni Padu	Kudaravalli	Jangamgudem
10	T.Kothapalem	Konathamatmakuru	Nandivada	Marribandam
11	Talagadadeevi	Konduru	Nuthulapadu	Mirijapuram
12	Barrankula	Latchapalem	Oddulameraka	Mokhasa Narasannapalem
13		Lingalapadu	Pedalingala	Morsapudi
14		Magallu	Pedavirivada	Mukkollupadu
15		Munagacherla	Polukonda	Narsupet
16		Nandigama	Puttagunta	Pallerlamudi
17		Pallagiri	Ramapuram	Pothureddipalli
18		Pedavaram	Rudrapaka	Polasanapalli
19		Raghavapuram	Sreenivasapuram	Ramannagudem
20		Ramireddipalli	Tamirisa	Ravicherla
21		Rudravaram	Thummalapalli	Seetarampuram
22		Satyavaram	Vennanapudi	Sunkollu
23		Somavaram	VENKATA RAGHAVA PURAM	Tukkuluru (M)
24		Thakkellapadu		Vempadu
25		Torragudipadu		Venkatayapalem

== P ==
#	Pamarru mandal	Pamidimukkala mandal	Pedana mandal	Pedaparupudi mandal	Penamaluru mandal	Penuganchiprolu mandal
1	Addada	Aginaparru	Balliparru	Appikatla	Chodavaram	Anigandlapadu
2	Ainampudi	Ameenapuram	Chennuru	Bhushanagulla (Rural)	Gosala	Gummadidurru
3	Balliparru	Chennuruvaripalem	Chevendra	Chinaparupudi	Pedapulipaka	Kollikulla
4	Jujjavaram	Choragudi	Chodavaram	Edulamaddali	Vanukuru	Konakanchi
5	Kanumuru	Fathelanka	Devarapalli	Elamarru		Lingagudem
6	Kapavaram	Gopuvanipalem	Dirisavalli	Gurivindagunta		Muchintala @ Bodapadu
7	Komaravolu	Gurazada	Gurivindagunta	Juvvanapudi		Mundlapadu
8	Kondiparru	Hanumanthapuram	Jinjeru	Kornipadu		Nawabpeta
9	Kurumaddali	Inampudi	Kakarlamudi	Maheswarapuram		Penuganchiprolu
10	Mallavaram	Inapuru	Kamalapuram	Moparru		Sanagapadu
11	Nemmikuru	Kapileswarapuram	Kavipuram	Pamulapadu		Subbayagudem
12	Nibhanupudi	Krishnapuram	Kongamcherla	Pedaparupudi		Thotacherla
13	Nimmaluru	Kuderu	Konkepudi	Ravulapadu		Venkatapuram
14	Pamarru	Lankapalli	Koppalli	Somavarappadu		
15	Pasumarru	Mamillapalli	Kuduru	Vanapamula		
16	Pedamaddali	Mantada	Kummarigunta	Ventrapragada		
17	Polavaram	Marrivada	Lankalakalavagunta	Vinjarampadu		
18	Prakarla	Meduru	Madaka	Zamidintakurru		
19	Raparla	Mullapudi	Mutcherla			
20	Rimmanapudi	Pamidimukkala	Mutchiligunta			
21	Zami Golvepalli	Penumatcha				

== R ==
#	Reddigudem mandal
1	Anneraopeta
2	Kudapa
3	Kunaparajuparva
4	Maddulaparva
5	Mutchinapalli
6	Naguluru
7	Narukullapadu
8	Patha Naguluru
9	Rangapuram
10	Reddigudem
9	Raghavapuram
11	Rudravaram

== T ==
#	Thotlavalluru mandal	Tiruvuru mandal
1	Boddapadu	Akkapalem
2	Chagantipadu	Anjaneyapuram
3	Chinapulipaka	Chintalapadu
4	Kallamvari Palem	Chittela
5	Pamulapati vari Palem	Erramadu
6	Devarapalli	Ganugapadu
7	Garikaparru	Kokilampadu
8	Gurivindapalli	Laxmipuram
9	Iluru	Mallela
10	Kanakavalli	Munukulla
11	Kummamuru	Mustikuntla
12	Madhurapuram	Nadim Tiruvuru
13	Mulakalapalli	Patha Tiruvuru
14	vamakuvamakuntla Valluru	Peddavaram
15	Penamakuru	Rajupeta
16	Royyuru	Ramannapalem
17	South Valluru	Rolupadi
18	Yakamuru	Vamakuntla
19		Vavilala
20		G Kothuru

== U ==
#	Unguturu mandal
1	Amudalapalli
2	Atkuru
3	Bokinala
4	Chagantipadu
5	Chikinala
6	Elukapadu
7	Garapadu
8	Indupalle
9	Koyyagurapadu
10	Lankapalle Agraharam
11	Madhirapadu
12	Manikonda
13	Mukkapadu
14	Nagavarappadu
15	Nandamuru
16	Ondrampadu
17	Peda Avutapalli
18	Ponukumadu
19	Pottipadu
20	Tarigoppula
21	Telaprolu
22	Tuttagunta
23	Unguturu
24	Veldipadu
25	Velinutala
26	Vemanda
27	Vempadu

== V ==
#	Vatsavai mandal	Veerullapadu mandal	Vijayawada (rural) mandal	Vissannapeta mandal	Vuyyuru mandal
1	Allurupadu	Alluru	Gudavalli	Chandrupatla	Akunuru
2	Bhimavaram	Bodavada	Kotturu	Kalagara	Bollapadu
3	China Modugapalli	Chattannavaram	Paidurupadu	Kondaparva	China Ogirala
4	Chittela	Chavatapalli	Rayanapadu	Korlamanda	Jabarlapudi
5	Chennaropalem	Shabada	Narasapuram	Kadavakollu	
6	Dechupalem	Dachavaram	Tadepalli	Putrela	Kalavapamula
7	Gangavalli	Dodda Devarapadu	Vemavaram	Tata Kuntla	Katuru
8	Gopinenipalem	Gokarajupalli	Enikepadu	Tella Devarapalli	Mudunuru
9	Indugapalli	Gudem Madhavaram	Nidamanuru	Vemireddipalle	Peda Ogirala
10	Kakaravai	Jagannadhapuram		Vissannapeta	Saipuram
11	Kambampadu	Jammavaram		Veeravalli Mokhasa	
12	Kanneveedu	Jayanthi			Vuyyuru
13	Lingala	Jujjuru			
14	Machinenipalem	Konatalapalli			
15	Makkapeta	Nandaluru			
16	Mangollu	Narasimharaopalem			
17	Peda Modugapalli	Pallampalli			
18	Pochavaram	Peddapuram			
19	Polampalli	Ponnavaram			
20	Talluru	Tatigummi			
21	Vatsavai	Thimmapuram			
22	Vemavaram	Vairidhari Annavaram			
23	Vemulanarva	Veerullapadu			
24		Vellanki			

== See also ==
- List of villages in Guntur district
