= Nagavarappadu =

- Village
- Interactive map of Nagavarappadu
- Location in Andhra Pradesh, India Nagavarappadu (India)
- Coordinates: 16°27′1.29″N 80°59′21.04″E
- Country: India
- State: Andhra Pradesh
- District: Krishna

Government
  - Body: president

Area
  - Total: 2.46 km^{2} (0.95 sq mi)

Population (2011)
  - Total: 1,007
  - Density: 409/km^{2} (1,060/sq mi)

Languages
  - Official: Telugu
- Time zone: UTC+5:30 (IST)

Nagavarappadu is a village in Krishna district of the Indian state of Andhra Pradesh. It is located in Unguturu mandal of Nuzvid revenue division. It is a part of Andhra Pradesh Capital Region.

== See also ==
- List of villages in Krishna district
