= Bobbellapadu =

- Village
- Interactive map of Bobbellapadu
- Location in Andhra Pradesh, India Bobbellapadu (India)
- Coordinates: 16°42′59″N 80°12′19″E
- Country: India
- State: Andhra Pradesh
- District: NTR

Area
  - Total: 10.61 km^{2} (4.10 sq mi)

Population
  - Total: 1,346
  - Density: 126.9/km^{2} (328.6/sq mi)

Languages
  - Official: Telugu
- Time zone: UTC+5:30 (IST)

Bobbellapadu is a village in NTR district of the Indian state of Andhra Pradesh. It is located in Chandarlapadu mandal of Vijayawada revenue division. It is a part of Andhra Pradesh Capital Region.

== Demographics ==
It has approximately 1261 residents in approximately 362 households. It has pincode 521182.

== Inscriptions ==
- 1520 C. E.
- 1548 C. E.
