= Kakaravai =

- Village
- Interactive map of Kakaravai
- Location in Andhra Pradesh, India
- Country: India
- State: Andhra Pradesh
- District: NTR
- Mandal: Vatsavai

Government
  - Type: Panchayati raj
  - Body: Kakaravai gram panchayat

Area
  - Total: 661 ha (1,630 acres)

Population (2011)
  - Total: 1,856
  - Density: 281/km^{2} (727/sq mi)

Languages
  - Official: Telugu
- Time zone: UTC+5:30 (IST)
- Area code: +91–
- Vehicle registration: AP

Kakaravai is a village in NTR district of the Indian state of Andhra Pradesh. It is located in Vatsavai mandal of Vijayawada revenue division.
