= Pochavaram =

- Village
- Interactive map of Pochavaram
- Location in Andhra Pradesh, India
- Country: India
- State: Andhra Pradesh
- District: NTR
- Mandal: Vatsavai

Government
  - Type: Panchayati raj
  - Body: Pochavaram gram panchayat

Area
  - Total: 210 ha (520 acres)

Population (2011)
  - Total: 560
  - Density: 270/km^{2} (690/sq mi)

Languages
  - Official: Telugu
- Time zone: UTC+5:30 (IST)
- Area code: +91–
- Vehicle registration: AP

Pochavaram is a village in NTR district of the Indian state of Andhra Pradesh. It is located in Vatsavai mandal of Vijayawada revenue division.
