= Korlagunta =

Village in Andhra Pradesh, India

- Village
- Interactive map of Korlagunta
- Location in Andhra Pradesh, India Korlagunta (India)
- Coordinates: 16.17°N 81.13°E
- Country: India
- State: Andhra Pradesh
- District: Eluru

Area
  - Total: 5.82 km^{2} (2.25 sq mi)
- Elevation: 34 m (112 ft)

Population (2011)
  - Total: 1,910
  - Density: 328/km^{2} (850/sq mi)

Languages
  - Official: Telugu
- Time zone: UTC+5:30 (IST)
- PIN: 521201
- Telephone code: 08656
- Vehicle registration: AP

Korlagunta is a village in Eluru district of the Indian state of Andhra Pradesh. It is located in Musunuru mandal of Nuzvid revenue division.

== See also ==
- Musunuru mandal
