= Anigandlapadu =

- Village
- Interactive map of Anigandlapadu
- Location in Andhra Pradesh, India
- Coordinates: 16.8923994°N 80.2785826°E
- Country: India
- State: Andhra Pradesh
- District: NTR
- Mandal: Penuganchiprolu

Government
  - Type: Panchayati raj
  - Body: Anigandlapadu gram panchayat

Area
  - Total: 2,038 ha (5,040 acres)

Population (2011)
  - Total: 8,062
  - Density: 395.6/km^{2} (1,025/sq mi)

Languages
  - Official: Telugu
- Time zone: UTC+5:30 (IST)
- PIN: 521190
- Area code: +91–8678
- Vehicle registration: AP

Anigandlapadu is a village in NTR district of the Indian state of Andhra Pradesh. It is located in Penuganchiprolu mandal of Vijayawada revenue division.

== Geography ==
Anigandlapadu is located at 16°53′31″N 80°17′13″E. It has an average elevation of 42 metres (141 feet).
