= Balive =

- Village
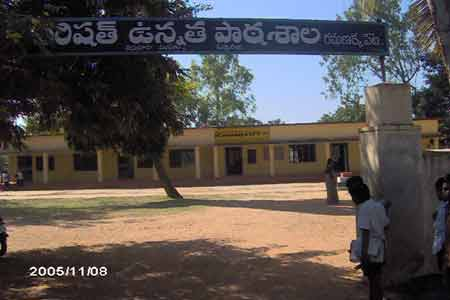
- ZPH School in the village
- Interactive map of Balive
- Location in Andhra Pradesh, India Balive (India)
- Coordinates: 16.81274°N 81.01682°E
- Country: India
- State: Andhra Pradesh
- District: Eluru

Area
  - Total: 14.75 km^{2} (5.70 sq mi)

Population (2011)
  - Total: 4,374
  - Density: 296.5/km^{2} (768.0/sq mi)

Languages
  - Official: Telugu
- Time zone: UTC+5:30 (IST)

Balive is a village in the Eluru district of the Indian state of Andhra Pradesh. It is located in Musunuru mandal, of Nuzvid revenue division. It is approximately 15 km (9 miles) from district headquarters Eluru city in Eluru District.

== Temple of Lord Shiva ==
A temple of the Hindu deity, Shiva is there. Devotees believe that visiting the temple will achieve the fulfillment of their desires. Traditionally, visitors chant the slogan "Jai Balive Ramaswamy" (Balive Ramalingeswara Swamy, Maheshwara or Lord Shiva) which translates to "Victory to Lord Shiva".

== Transport ==
Balive is accessible via Eluru, situated approximately 60 km (37 miles) from Vijayawada.

Eluru has one of the major ('A' Category) Railway stations in the Vijayawada Railway Division. It is one of the major stops for most super fast trains on the Vijayawada - Visakhapatnam route. No direct railway serves Balive.

A non-stop Andhra Pradesh RTC bus service operates between Vijayawada and Eluru. Various RTC and privately owned transportation services are available. APS RTC provides many bus services from Eluru to Balive

The nearest Airport is Gannavaram Airport, Vijayawada approximately 40 km from Eluru.
