= Kanneveedu =

- Village
- Interactive map of Kanneveedu
- Location in Andhra Pradesh, India
- Coordinates: 16°57′35″N 80°11′27″E
- Country: India
- State: Andhra Pradesh
- District: NTR
- Mandal: Vatsavai

Government
  - Type: Panchayati raj
  - Body: Kanneveedu gram panchayat

Area
  - Total: 634 ha (1,570 acres)

Population (2011)
  - Total: 2,182
  - Density: 344/km^{2} (891/sq mi)

Languages
  - Official: Telugu
- Time zone: UTC+5:30 (IST)
- Area code: +91–
- Vehicle registration: AP

Kanneveedu is a village in NTR district of the Indian state of Andhra Pradesh. It is located in Vatsavai mandal of Vijayawada revenue division.
