= Allurupadu =

- Village
- Interactive map of Allurupadu
- Location in Andhra Pradesh, India
- Country: India
- State: Andhra Pradesh
- District: NTR
- Mandal: Vatsavai

Government
  - Type: Panchayati raj
  - Body: Allurupadu gram panchayat

Area
  - Total: 275 ha (680 acres)

Population (2011)
  - Total: 1,207
  - Density: 439/km^{2} (1,140/sq mi)

Languages
  - Official: Telugu
- Time zone: UTC+5:30 (IST)
- Area code: +91–
- Vehicle registration: AP

Allurupadu is a village in NTR district of the Indian state of Andhra Pradesh. It is located in Vatsavai mandal of Vijayawada revenue division. Agricultural products of the village include rice, chili peppers and cotton.
