= Mundlapadu =

- Village
- Interactive map of Mundlapadu
- Location in Andhra Pradesh, India
- Coordinates: 16.4000°N 81.1167°E
- Country: India
- State: Andhra Pradesh
- District: NTR
- Mandal: Penuganchiprolu

Government
  - Type: Panchayati raj
  - Body: Mundlapadu gram panchayat

Area
  - Total: 1,688 ha (4,170 acres)

Population (2011)
  - Total: 3,254
  - Density: 192.8/km^{2} (499.3/sq mi)

Languages
  - Official: Telugu
- Time zone: UTC+5:30 (IST)
- PIN: 521190
- Area code: +91–8678
- Vehicle registration: AP

Mundlapadu is a village in NTR district of the Indian state of Andhra Pradesh. It is located in Penuganchiprolu mandal of Vijayawada revenue division.

== History ==
The village is famous for its great heritage and culture. Sri Ramalingeswara Swami Devalayam temple has 300 years of history. Its presiding deity is Sri Parvathi Sahitha Ramalingeswara Swami, and it was built by the Apotheosis Sree sachidananda swami before his self-entombment.

== Demographics ==
As of 2011 Census of India, the town had a population of 3,254. The total population constitute, 1,655 males, 1,599 females and 304 children, in the age group of 0–6 years. The average literacy rate stands at 66.92% with 1,974 literates, significantly lower than the national average of 73.00%.

== Economy ==
Agriculture is the main occupation here with major crops being cotton, paddy, chillies, and casurina. Bengalgram and redgram is also grown. Sunflower is important flower grown in Mundlapadu.
