= Tiruvuru mandal =

Tiruvuru
- Mandal
- Interactive Map Outlining Tiruvuru mandal
- Location in Andhra Pradesh, India
- Coordinates: 17°06′N 80°36′E
- Country: India
- State: Andhra Pradesh
- District: NTR
- Headquarters: Tiruvuru
- Major villages: old Tiruvuru, Middle Tiruvuru Rajupet

Government
  - Type: Samsthan
  - Body: Mandal Parishad

Area
  - Total: 184.32 km^{2} (71.17 sq mi)

Population (2011)
  - Total: 76,731
  - Density: 416.29/km^{2} (1,078.2/sq mi)

Languages
  - Official: Telugu
- Time zone: UTC+5:30 (IST)
- Vehicle registration: AP 16

Tiruvuru mandal is one of the 20 mandals in NTR district of the Indian state of Andhra Pradesh. The headquarters of this mandal is located at Tiruvuru town. The mandal is bordered by Khammam district to the north, Vissannapeta mandal to the east, A Konduru mandal to the south and Gampalagudem mandal to the west.

== Demographics ==
As of 2011 census, the mandal had a population of 76,731 living in 20,605 households. The total population constituted 38,679 males and 38,052 females, for a sex ratio of 984 females per 1000 males. There were 7,041 children in the age group of 0–6 years, of which 3,588 were boys and 3,453 were girls, for a sex ratio of 962. The average literacy rate stands at 66.11% with 46,072 literates, of which 25,452 are males and 20,620 are females. There were 23,572 members of Scheduled Castes and 2,181 members of Scheduled Tribes.

=== Labor Statistics ===
As per the report published by Census of India in 2011, 37,970 people were engaged in work activities, including 22,667 males and 15,303 females. In the census, 32,745 workers describe their work as main work, 3,946 as cultivators, 18,345 as agricultural labourers, 428 in household industry and 10,026 were involved in other works. Of these, 5,225 were marginal workers.

== Administration ==
Tiruvuru mandal is administered under the Tiruvuru (SC) Assembly constituency of the Vijayawada Lok Sabha constituency. It is one of the fifteen mandals those falls under Nuzvid revenue division.

== Towns and villages ==
As of 2011 census, there are a total of 19 settlements in the mandal. Tiruvuru is the largest and Peddavaram is the smallest in terms of population.

The settlements in the mandal are:

1. Akkapalem
2. Anjaneyapuram
3. Chintalapadu
4. Chittela
5. Erramadu
6. Ganugapadu
7. Kokilampadu
8. Laxmipuram
9. Mallela
10. Munukulla
11. Mustikuntla
12. Patha
13. Peddavaram
14. Rajupeta
15. Ramannapalem
16. Rolupadi
17. Kommireddypalli
18. Tiruvuru
19. Vamakuntla
20. Vavilala

== Education ==
The mandal plays a major role in education for the rural students of nearby villages. The primary and secondary school education is imparted by government, aided by private schools, under the School Education Department of the state. As per the school information report for the academic year 2015–16, the mandal has more than 10,990 students enrolled in over 95 schools.

== See also ==
- List of mandals in Andhra Pradesh
- Vijayawada
