= Enikepadu =

- Neighbourhood
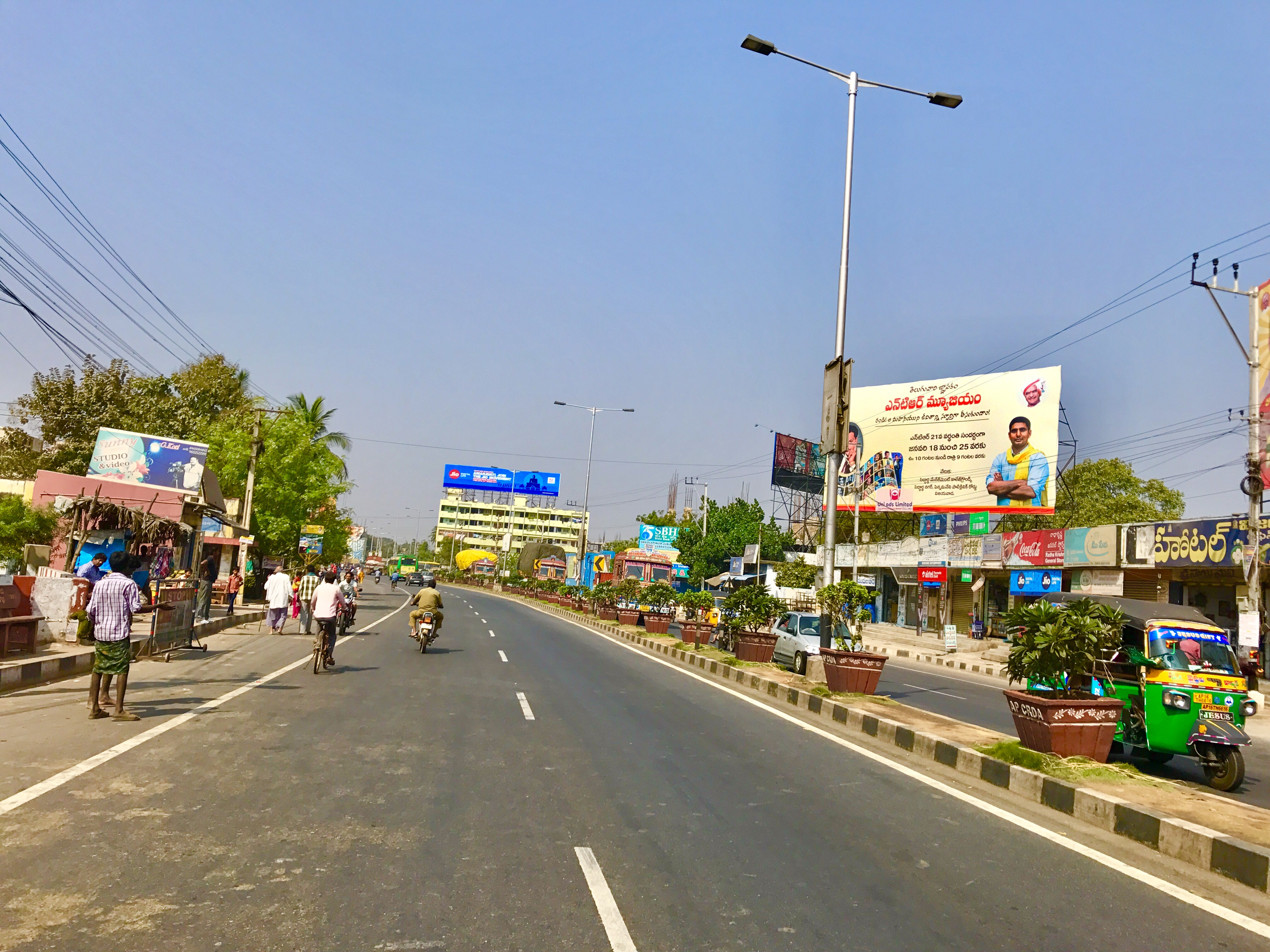
- AH-45 near Enikepadu

- Location within Andhra Pradesh
- Coordinates: 16°30′58″N 80°42′05″E
- Country: India
- State: Andhra Pradesh
- Region: Coastal Andhra
- District: NTR
- Mandal: Vijayawada Rural mandal
- City: Vijayawada
- Metropolitan Area: Andhra Pradesh Capital Region

Area
  - Total: 4.87 km^{2} (1.88 sq mi)
- Elevation: 21 m (69 ft)

Population (2011)
  - Total: 11,039
  - Density: 2,270/km^{2} (5,870/sq mi)
- Time zone: UTC+5:30 (IST)
- PIN: 521108
- Telephone code: +91-866
- Parliament constituencies: Machilipatnam
- Sasana Sabha constituencies: Gannavaram

Enikepadu is a locality in Vijayawada, Krishna district of the Indian state of Andhra Pradesh. According to the G.O. No. M.S.104 (dated 23 March 2017), Municipal Administration and Urban Development Department, the it became a part of Vijayawada metropolitan area. It contains huge number of industries.

== See also ==
- List of villages in Krishna district
