= Telladevarapalli =

- Village
- Interactive map of Telladevarapalli
- Location in Andhra Pradesh, India
- Country: India
- State: Andhra Pradesh
- District: NTR
- Mandal: Vissannapeta

Area
  - Total: 13.42 km^{2} (5.18 sq mi)

Population (2011)
  - Total: 3,349
  - Density: 249.6/km^{2} (646.3/sq mi)

Languages
  - Official: Telugu
- Time zone: UTC+5:30 (IST)

Telladevarapalli is a village in Visannapeta mandal, NTR district, Andhra Pradesh, India.
