= Ampapuram =

- Village
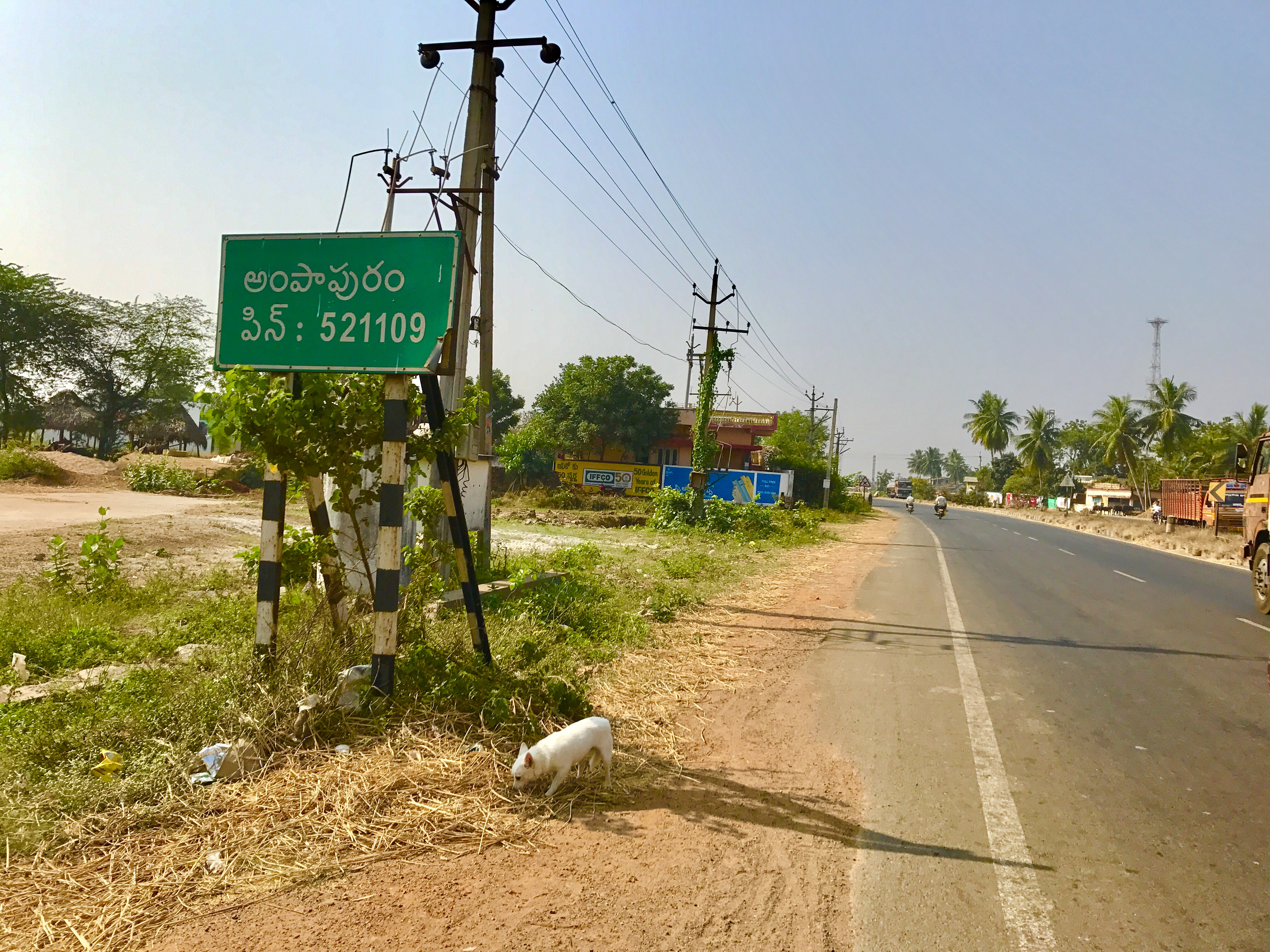
- Village board on AH-45
- Interactive map of Ampapuram
- Location in Andhra Pradesh, India Ampapuram (India)
- Coordinates: 16.598952°N 80.893817°E
- Country: India
- State: Andhra Pradesh
- District: Krishna
- Elevation: 17 m (56 ft)

Population (2011)
  - Total: 4,110

Languages
  - Official: Telugu
- Time zone: UTC+5:30 (IST)

Ampapuram is a village in Krishna district of the Indian state of Andhra Pradesh. It is located in Bapulapadu mandal of Nuzvid revenue division. It is one of the villages in the mandal to be a part of Andhra Pradesh Capital Region.
