= Vatsavai =

- Village
- Interactive map of Vatsavai
- Location in Andhra Pradesh, India
- Country: India
- State: Andhra Pradesh
- District: NTR
- Mandal: Vatsavai

Government
  - Type: Gram Panchayat

Area
  - Total: 1,957 ha (4,840 acres)

Population (2011)
  - Total: 9,554
  - Density: 488.2/km^{2} (1,264/sq mi)

Languages
  - Official: Telugu
- Time zone: UTC+5:30 (IST)
- Vehicle registration: AP39

Vatsavai is a village in NTR district of the Indian state of Andhra Pradesh. It is located in Vatsavai mandal of Nandigama revenue division. According to the 2011 Census, Vatsavai has a population of approximately 9,554. The village comprises around 2,631 households.
