= Ravulapadu =

- Village
- Interactive map of Ravulapadu
- Location in Andhra Pradesh, India
- Country: India
- State: Andhra Pradesh
- District: Krishna
- Mandal: Pedaparupudi

Area
  - Total: 1.79 km^{2} (0.69 sq mi)

Population (2011)
  - Total: 347
  - Density: 194/km^{2} (502/sq mi)

Languages
  - Official: Telugu
- Time zone: UTC+5:30 (IST)

Ravulapadu is a village in Krishna district of the Indian state of Andhra Pradesh. It is the mandal headquarters of Pedaparupudi mandal in Nuzvid revenue division.

== See also ==
- Villages in Pedaparupudi mandal
