= Musunuru =

- Village
- Interactive map of Musunuru
- Location in Andhra Pradesh, India
- Coordinates: 16.827°N 80.934°E
- Country: India
- State: Andhra Pradesh
- District: Eluru

Area
  - Total: 22.06 km^{2} (8.52 sq mi)
- Elevation: 78 m (256 ft)

Population (2011)
  - Total: 6,095
  - Density: 276.3/km^{2} (715.6/sq mi)

Languages
  - Official: Telugu
- Time zone: UTC+5:30 (IST)

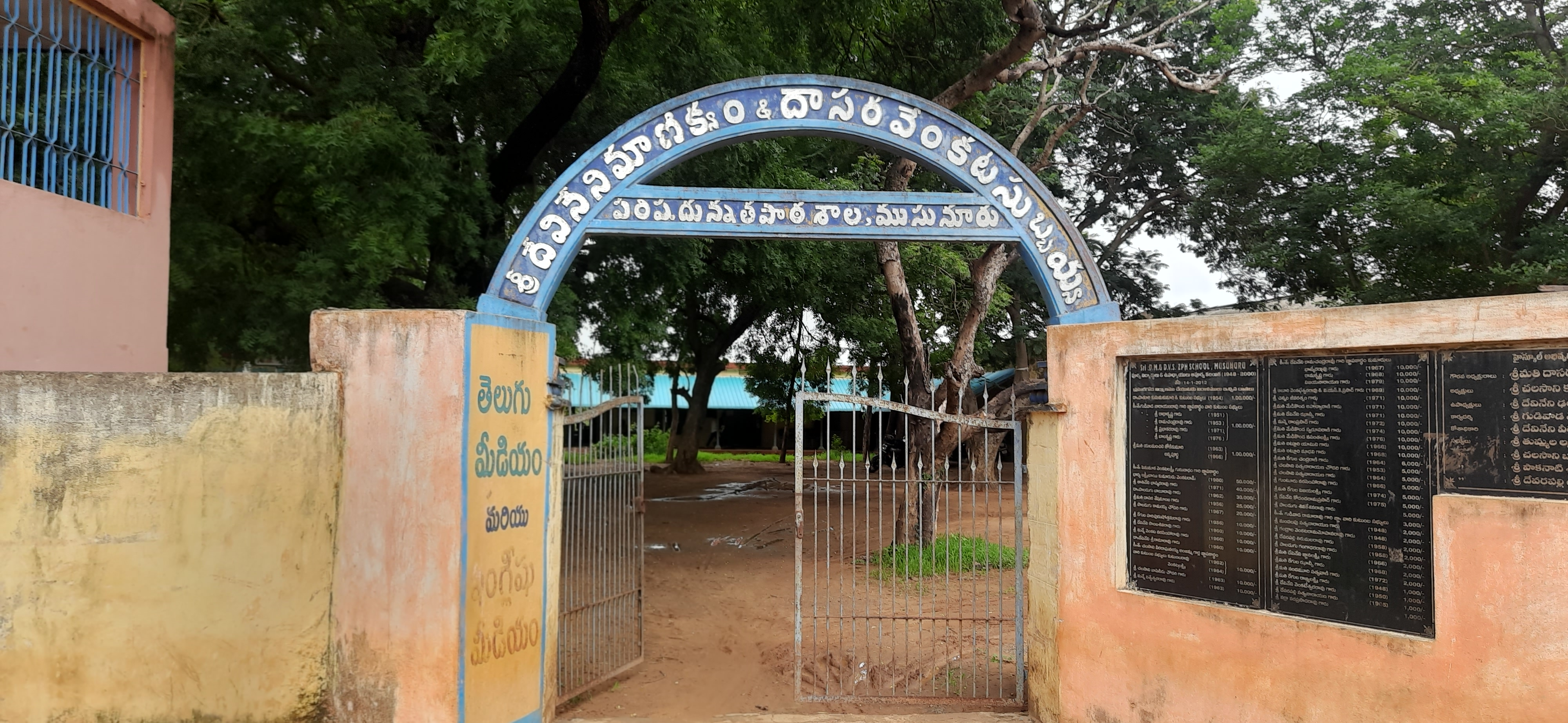
High school in Musunuru

Musunuru is a village in Eluru district of the Indian state of Andhra Pradesh. It is located in Musunuru mandal of Nuzvid revenue division.

== See also ==
- Musunuri Nayakas, a ruling dynasty of 14th-century India (Telangana and Andhra Pradesh)
- Kiran Musunuru, Indian-American physician
- Musunuri Lalith Babu, Indian chess player
