= Madicherla =

Madicherla mdcl
- Village
- Interactive map of Madicherla
- Location in Andhra Pradesh, India Madicherla (India)
- Coordinates: 16.7362°N 80.9832°E
- Country: India
- State: Andhra Pradesh
- District: Krishna

Area
  - Total: 15.90 km^{2} (6.14 sq mi)

Languages
  - Official: Telugu
- Time zone: UTC+5:30 (IST)
- PIN: 521110

Madicharla is a village in Krishna district of the Indian state of Andhra Pradesh. It is located in Bapulapadu mandal of Nuzvid revenue division. It is one of the villages in the mandal to be a part of Andhra Pradesh Capital Region.
