= Maremanda =

- Village
- Interactive map of Maremanda
- Location in Andhra Pradesh, India Maremanda (India)
- Country: India
- State: Andhra Pradesh
- District: NTR

Languages
  - Official: Telugu
- Time zone: UTC+5:30 (IST)

Maremanda is a village in Vissannapet mandal, located in NTR district of the Indian state of Andhra Pradesh.
