= Mundlapati Ramanadha Rao =

Mundlapati'Ramanadha Rao'
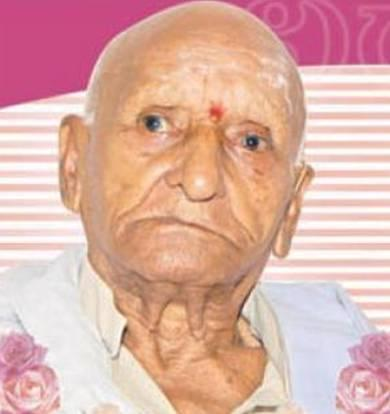
- Died: Vijayawada, India
- Other names: Pedda Rammayya, Vakkapodi Pantulu
- Organization: Indian National Congress

Mundlapati Ramanadha Rao was an Indian nationalist, social worker and freedom fighter from Andhra Pradesh.

== Political career ==
Rao was fascinated as a child by Mahatma Gandhi's ideology of non-violence. He joined the campaign for Indian independence. He entered the Khadi movement and spent six months in Sabarmati Ashram with Gandhi at the age of 26.

He worked for rural development after independence. Apart from this he focused on Penuganchiprolu mandal in Krishna district.

With the public support he was elected as Society President unanimously for three decades (from 1955 to 1986 around).

He also kept his efforts for the construction of the Nagarjuna Sagar Dam and Pulichintala Project along with his friend Muktyala Raja.
