= Krishnaraoalem =

Krishnaraopalem
- Village
- Interactive map of Krishnaraopalem
- Location in Andhra Pradesh, India
- Country: India
- State: Andhra Pradesh
- District: Eluru

Area
  - Total: 3.69 km^{2} (1.42 sq mi)

Population (2011)
  - Total: 901
  - Density: 244/km^{2} (632/sq mi)

Languages
  - Official: Telugu
- Time zone: UTC+5:30 (IST)

Krishnaraopalem is a village in Eluru district of the Indian state of Andhra Pradesh. It is located in Chatrai mandal of Nuzvid revenue division.
