= Vijayawada Rural mandal =

- Mandal
- Interactive Map Outlining Vijayawada Rural mandal
- Location in Andhra Pradesh, India
- Coordinates: 16°32′45″N 80°34′12″E
- Country: India
- State: Andhra Pradesh
- District: NTR
- Headquarters: Governorpet

Area
  - Total: 153.97 km^{2} (59.45 sq mi)

Population (2011)
  - Total: 153,591
  - Density: 997.54/km^{2} (2,583.6/sq mi)

Languages
  - Official: Telugu
- Time zone: UTC+5:30 (IST)

Vijayawada Rural mandal is one of the 20 mandals in NTR district of the Indian state of Andhra Pradesh. It is under the administration of Vijayawada revenue division and has its headquarters at Nunna. The mandal is bounded by Ibrahimpatnam, G. Konduru, Gannavaram, Kankipadu, Penamaluru and Patamata (Vijayawada east) Mandals. The mandal is also a part of the Andhra Pradesh Capital Region under the jurisdiction of APCRDA.

== Demographics ==
As of 2011 census, the mandal had a population of 153,591. The total population constitute, 79,926 males and 73,665 females —a sex ratio of 922 females per 1000 males. 14,771 children are in the age group of 0–6 years, of which 7,699 are boys and 7,072 are girls. The average literacy rate stands at 80.09% with 111,181 literates. Gollapudi is the most populated village and Vemavaram is the least populated village in the mandal.

== Towns and villages ==
As of 2011 census, the mandal has 18 settlements. On 23 March 2017, as per the G.O. 104 of Municipal Administration and Urban Development Department, Ambapuram, Done Atukuru, Enikepadu, Gollapudi, Gudavalli, Jakkampudi, Nidamanuru, Nunna, Pathapadu, Prasadampadu, Ramavarappadu became a part of Vijayawada metropolitan area.

The settlements in the mandal are listed below:

1. Kothuru
2. Paidurupadu
3. Phiryadi Nainavaram (OG)
4. Rayanapadu
5. Shahabad
6. Tadepalle
7. Vemavaram

Note: M-Municipality, (CT)-Census town, OG-Out Growth

== See also ==
- Vijayawada revenue division
