= Janardhanavaram =

- Village
- Interactive map of Janardhanavaram
- Location in Andhra Pradesh, India Janardhanavaram (India)
- Coordinates: 16°58′03″N 80°51′43″E
- Country: India
- State: Andhra Pradesh
- District: Eluru
- Mandal: Chatrai

Area
  - Total: 6.06 km^{2} (2.34 sq mi)

Population (2011)
  - Total: 2,314
  - Density: 382/km^{2} (989/sq mi)

Languages
  - Official: Telugu
- Time zone: UTC+5:30 (IST)
- Vehicle registration: AP

Janardhanavaram is a village in Eluru district of the Indian state of Andhra Pradesh. It is located in Chatrai mandal of Nuzvid revenue division.
