= Pedasanagallu =

- Village
- Interactive map of Pedasanagallu
- Location in Andhra Pradesh, India
- Country: India
- State: Andhra Pradesh
- District: Krishna

Area
  - Total: 6.94 km^{2} (2.68 sq mi)

Population (2011)
  - Total: 3,290
  - Density: 474/km^{2} (1,230/sq mi)

Languages
  - Official: Telugu
- Time zone: UTC+5:30 (IST)
- Vehicle registration: AP–16

Pedasanagallu is a village in Krishna district of the Indian state of Andhra Pradesh. It is located in Movva mandal of Machilipatnam revenue division. It is one of the villages in the mandal to be a part of Andhra Pradesh Capital Region.

== Surapaneni Family ==
Surapaneni is the most common surname in the village. The Surapaneni genealogical tree has been traced up ten generations by two village elders, Yeddanapudi Vithal Venu Gopala Rao and Sri Surapaneni Venkata Krishna Rao. The first Surapaneni family in Pedasanagallu was that of two brothers, Chowdarayya and Kistamma who migrated from Surapanenivaripalem in c. 1820. While Chowdarayya's male line died out, Kistamma's line continued and is the most prominent one today. This Surapaneni family also married into the Cherukuri, Lingam, and Lingamaneni families.

== See also ==
- Villages in Movva mandal
