= Vijayawada division =

Vijayawada division may refer to:

- Vijayawada revenue division
- Vijayawada railway division
