= Kotapadu =

- Village
- Interactive map of Kotapadu
- Location in Andhra Pradesh, India
- Country: India
- State: Andhra Pradesh
- District: Eluru
- Mandal: Chatrai

Area
  - Total: 27.72 km^{2} (10.70 sq mi)

Population (2011)
  - Total: 5,874
  - Density: 211.9/km^{2} (548.8/sq mi)

Languages
  - Official: Telugu
- Time zone: UTC+5:30 (IST)

Kotapadu is a village in Eluru district of the Indian state of Andhra Pradesh. It is located in Chatrai mandal of Nuzvid revenue division. It falls under the administration of Kotapadu panchayat.
