= Dodda Devarapadu =

- Village
- Interactive map of Dodda Devarapadu
- Location in Andhra Pradesh, India Dodda Devarapadu (India)
- Coordinates: 15.586°N 80.030°E
- Country: India
- State: Andhra Pradesh
- District: NTR
- Mandal: Veerulapadu

Government
  - Body: Grama Panchayath

Area
  - Total: 5.14 km^{2} (1.98 sq mi)

Population (2015)
  - Total: 2,357
  - Density: 459/km^{2} (1,190/sq mi)

Languages
  - Official: Telugu
- Time zone: UTC+5:30 (IST)
- Postal Index Number [PIN]: 521170
- Area code: 08678

Dodda Devarapadu is a village in Veerullapadu mandal in NTR district of Andhra Pradesh State, India. It is at the border of Andhra Pradesh and Telangana. It is located 124 km towards west from District headquarters Machilipatnam. Vijayawada, Jaggaiahpet, Nuzvid, are the nearby cities to Doddadevara padu.
