= Telaprolu =

- Village
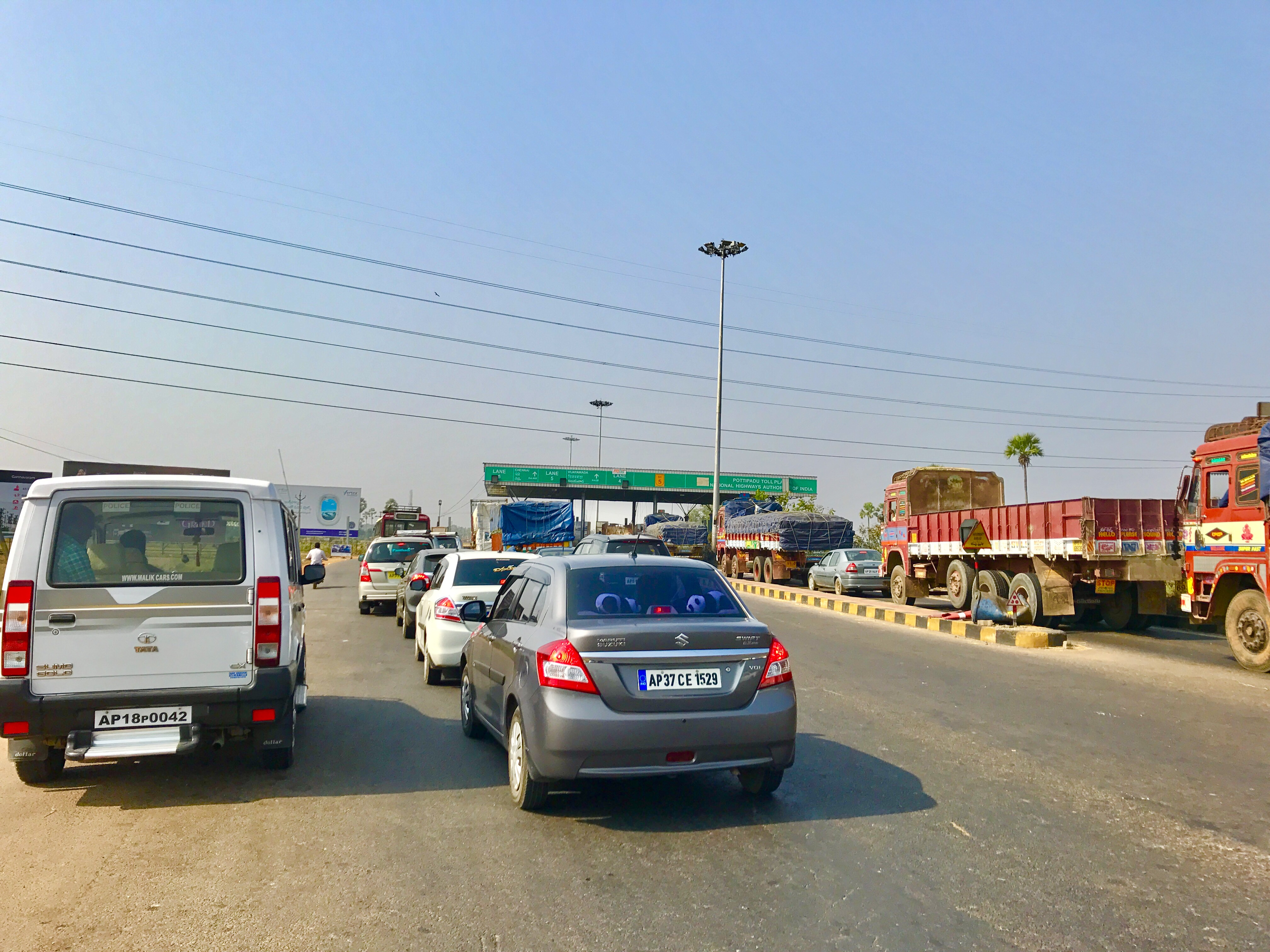
- Toll Plaza on AH-45 near Telaprolu
- Interactive map of Telaprolu
- Location in Andhra Pradesh, India Telaprolu (India)
- Coordinates: 16°34′29″N 80°53′39″E
- Country: India
- State: Andhra Pradesh
- District: krishna

Government
  - Body: unguturu Mandal

Area
  - Total: 25.45 km^{2} (9.83 sq mi)

Population (2011)
  - Total: 8,984
  - Density: 353.0/km^{2} (914.3/sq mi)

Languages
  - Official: Telugu
- Time zone: UTC+5:30 (IST)
- PIN: 521109
- Telephone code: +91–8676
- Vehicle registration: AP
- Lok Sabha: Machilipatnam
- Assembly constituency: Gannavaram

Telaprolu is a village in Krishna district of the Indian state of Andhra Pradesh. It is located in Unguturu mandal of Vijayawada revenue division. It is basically an agricultural village.

== Demographics ==
Telaprolu village has population of 8984 of which 4274 are males while 4710 are females. Average Sex Ratio of Telaprolu village is 1102 which is higher than Andhra Pradesh state average of 993. Population of children with age 0-6 is 782 which makes up 8.70 % of total population of village. Child Sex Ratio for the Telaprolu as per census is 1036, higher than Andhra Pradesh average of 939. The literacy rate of Telaprolu village was 73.42 % compared to 67.02 % of Andhra Pradesh.

== Historical Places ==
Telaprolu village famous for scenic beauty has also got important contribution towards historic temples like Rangamma thalli temple, Lord Shiva temple and Most famous Gayathri temple

== See also ==
- Unguturu mandal
