= Chanubanda =

- Village
- Interactive map of Chanubanda
- Location in Andhra Pradesh, India
- Coordinates: 17°01′59″N 80°48′20″E
- Country: India
- State: Andhra Pradesh
- Districts: Eluru

Area
  - Total: 34.45 km^{2} (13.30 sq mi)

Population (2011)
  - Total: 8,907
  - Density: 258.5/km^{2} (669.6/sq mi)

Languages
  - Official: Telugu
- Time zone: UTC+5:30 (IST)
- PIN: 521214
- Telephone code: +91-8673
- Vehicle registration: AP 06

Chanubanda or Tsanubanda is a village in Eluru district of the Indian state of Andhra Pradesh. It is located in Chatrai mandal of Nuzvid revenue division.

== Etymology ==
This is the most interesting story. 400 years ago this place was called chaluva banda which means cool rock. After some time passed this place became chanubanda in Telugu.
