= Gangineni railway station =

Railway station in Andhra Pradesh

Gangineni

General information
- Location: Ganginenipalem, G. Konduru, NTR district Andhra Pradesh; India
- Coordinates: 16.7449°N 80.5197°E
- System: Indian Railways station
- Owner: Indian Railways
- Operator: South Central Railway
- Line: Kazipet-Vijayawada section
- Platforms: 2
- Tracks: 2

Construction
- Structure type: On Ground

Other information
- Status: Functional
- Station code: GNN
- Zone(s): South Central Railway
- Division(s): Secunderabad railway division

Services
| Preceding station | Indian Railways | Following station |
|---|---|---|
| Errupalem towards Warangal | New Delhi–Chennai main line | Cheruvu Madhavaram towards Vijayawada |
Location
- Location within India Location within Andhra Pradesh
- Interactive map

Gangineni railway station (station code - GNN) is an Indian Railways station in Ganginenipalem, G. Konduru mandal of NTR district in Andhra Pradesh. It lies on Kazipet - Vijayawada section of New Delhi - Chennai main line. It is administered under Secunderabad railway division of the South Central Railway zone.

== See also ==
- List of railway stations in India
