= Vemavaram, NTR district =

Vemavaram
- Village
- Interactive map of Vemavaram
- Location in Andhra Pradesh, India
- Coordinates: 16°35′46″N 80°37′12″E
- Country: India
- State: Andhra Pradesh
- District: NTR
- Mandal: Vatsavai

Government
  - Type: Panchayati raj
  - Body: Vemavaram gram panchayat

Area
  - Total: 383 ha (950 acres)

Population (2011)
  - Total: 1,860
  - Density: 486/km^{2} (1,260/sq mi)

Languages
  - Official: Telugu
- Time zone: UTC+5:30 (IST)
- PIN: 521190
- Area code: +91–
- Vehicle registration: AP

Vemavaram is a village in NTR district of the Indian state of Andhra Pradesh. It is located in Vatsavai mandal of Vijayawada revenue division.
