= Nandigama revenue division =

Revenue division in Andhra Pradesh, India

- revenue division in NTR district
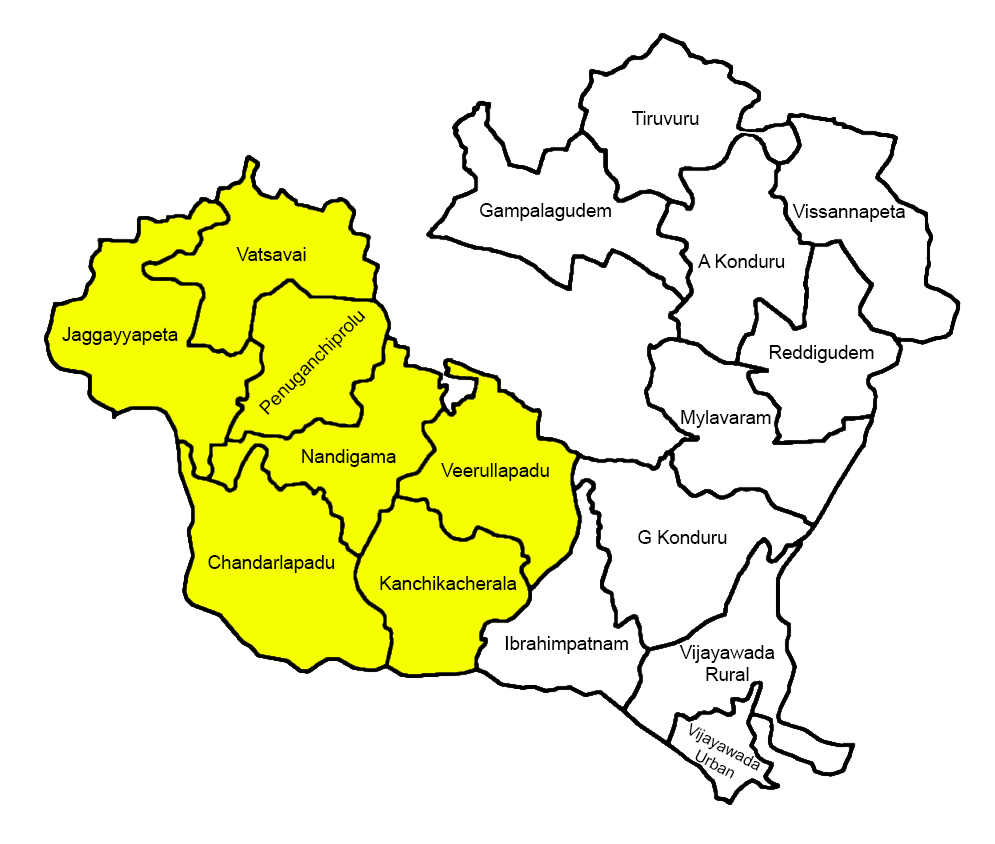
- Mandals in Nandigama revenue division highlighted in yellow
- Country: India
- State: Andhra Pradesh
- District: NTR
- Formed: 4 April 2022
- Headquarters: Nandigama
- Time zone: UTC+05:30 (IST)

Nandigama revenue division is an administrative division in the NTR district of the Indian state of Andhra Pradesh. It is one of the 3 revenue divisions in the district with 7 mandals under its administration and is formed on 4 April 2022 as part of a reorganisation of districts in the state. Nandigama serves as the headquarters of the division.

== Administration ==
The mandals in the division are

1. Jaggayyapeta
2. Vatsavai
3. Penuganchiprolu
4. Nandigama
5. Chandarlapadu
6. Kanchikacherla
7. Veerullapadu
