= Atluri =

Atluri (Telugu: అట్లూరి) is a Telugu surname.

Notable people with the surname include:

- Atluri Pitcheswara Rao (1925–1966), Telugu language writer
- Atluri Purnachandra Rao (1925–2017), Indian film producer
- Atluri Sriman Narayana, Indian dental surgeon
- Rakshit Atluri, Indian actor
- Satya N. Atluri (born 1945), Indian-American engineer
- Venky Atluri (born 1984), Indian film director
- Vijay Atluri (born 1956), Indian computer scientist
- Srinivas V Atluri, Lead Software Performance Engineer, USA (Studied at NIT Warangal, IIT Kharagpur, Ex-President of NIT Warangal Americas Alumni Chapter)
