= Ramanakkapeta =

- Village
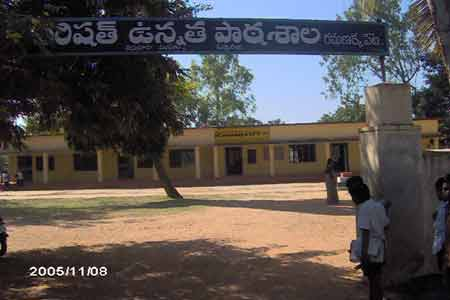
- ZPH School in the village
- Interactive map of Ramanakkapeta
- Location in Andhra Pradesh, India Ramanakkapeta (India)
- Coordinates: 16°53′4″N 80°52′26″E
- Country: India
- State: Andhra Pradesh
- District: Eluru

Area
  - Total: 14.75 km^{2} (5.70 sq mi)

Population (2011)
  - Total: 4,374
  - Density: 296.5/km^{2} (768.0/sq mi)

Languages
  - Official: Telugu
- Time zone: UTC+5:30 (IST)
- PIN: 521213 S.O.Ramanakkapeta
- Vehicle registration: AP
- Lok Sabha constituency: Machilipatnam
- Vidhan Sabha constituency: Nuzvidu

Ramanakkapeta is a village in Eluru district of the Indian state of Andhra Pradesh. It is located in Musunuru mandal of Nuzvid revenue division.

According to memoir by Dr. Benjamin Heyne (1 September 1795), this is a place where indigenous iron manufacturing method was practiced.
