= Palavaram, Eluru district =

Palavaram
- Village
- Interactive map of Palavaram
- Location in Andhra Pradesh, India
- Coordinates: 16°58′57″N 80°54′50″E
- Country: India
- State: Andhra Pradesh
- District: Eluru

Area
  - Total: 18.16 km^{2} (7.01 sq mi)

Population (2011)
  - Total: 4,670
  - Density: 257/km^{2} (666/sq mi)

Languages
  - Official: Telugu
- Time zone: UTC+5:30 (IST)
- Vehicle registration: AP

Palavaram is a village in Eluru district of the Indian state of Andhra Pradesh. It is located in Chatrai mandal of Nuzvid revenue division.
