= Vijayawada North mandal =

- Mandal
- Interactive Map Outlining Vijayawada Urban mandals
- Location in Andhra Pradesh, India
- Coordinates: 16.5391°N 80.6406°E
- Country: India
- State: Andhra Pradesh
- District: NTR
- Headquarters: Ajit Singh Nagar

Languages
  - Official: Telugu
- Time zone: UTC+5:30 (IST)

Vijayawada North mandal is one of the 20 mandals in the NTR district of the Indian state of Andhra Pradesh. It is one of the four mandals that formed from the Vijayawada Urban mandal after bifurcation in 2018 under the reorganization of revenue mandals. It is under the administration of Vijayawada revenue division, and the headquarters are located at Ajit Singh Nagar.

== Wards/villages included ==
Municipal Divisions of 1,5,43,44,45,46,47, 51, 52,53,54,55,56,57, 58,59 ( 16 Municipal Divisions):

1. Satyanarayana Puram
2. Payakapuram
3. Machavaram
4. Gunadala (Part)
5. Ajith Singh Nagar
6. Rajiv Nagar
7. Prakash Nagar
8. Kandrika
9. R.R peta
