= Oddulameraka =

- Village
- Interactive map of Oddulameraka
- Location in Andhra Pradesh, India
- Country: India
- State: Andhra Pradesh
- District: Krishna

Area
  - Total: 1.64 km^{2} (0.63 sq mi)

Population (2011)
  - Total: 278
  - Density: 170/km^{2} (439/sq mi)

Languages
  - Official: Telugu
- Time zone: UTC+5:30 (IST)
- Postal code: 521 xxx

Oddulameraka is a village in Krishna district of the Indian state of Andhra Pradesh. It is located in Nandivada mandal of Gudivada revenue division. It is one of the villages in the mandal to be a part of the Andhra Pradesh Capital Region.
