= Bhushanagulla =

- Village
- Interactive map of Bhushanagulla
- Location in Andhra Pradesh, India Bhushanagulla (India)
- Coordinates: 16°26′5.16″N 80°58′6.94″E
- Country: India
- State: Andhra Pradesh
- District: Krishna

Area
  - Total: 2.57 km^{2} (0.99 sq mi)

Population (2011)
  - Total: 2,029
  - Density: 789/km^{2} (2,040/sq mi)

Languages
  - Official: Telugu
- Time zone: UTC+5:30 (IST)

Bhushanagulla is a village in Krishna district of the Indian state of Andhra Pradesh. It is the mandal headquarters of Pedaparupudi mandal in Nuzvid revenue division.
