= Kilesapuram =

Kilesapuram Kotha Jupudi
- village
- Interactive map of Kilesapuram
- Location in Andhra Pradesh, India
- Country: India
- State: Andhra Pradesh
- District: NTR

Languages
  - Official: Telugu
- Time zone: UTC+5:30 (IST)
- PIN: 521456
- Telephone code: 08659
- Vehicle registration: AP
- Nearest city: Vijayawada
- Lok Sabha constituency: Vijayawada (Lok Sabha constituency)
- Vidhan Sabha constituency: Mylavaram

Kilesapuram is a village in Ibrahimpatnam Mandal, under Jupudi grama panchyat, NTR district, Andhra Pradesh, India. It falls Under the Mylavaram Assembly constituency and Vijayawada Loksabha constituency. It locates on the ferry of Krishna river.

== Demographics ==
Rural Households	Total Population	Male Population	Female Population	Youngsters Under Age of 6 Yrs	Boys Under 6 Yrs	Girls Under 6 Yrs	Total Literates	Total Illiterates
998	3467	1,569	1,898	514	257	257		
