= Penuganchiprolu =

- Village
- Sri Tirupatamma Ammavari Temple
- Interactive map of Penuganchiprolu
- Location in Andhra Pradesh, India
- Coordinates: 16.9033293°N 80.2356245°E
- Country: India
- State: Andhra Pradesh
- District: NTR
- Mandal: Penuganchiprolu

Government
  - Type: Gram Panchayat
  - Sarpanch: V Padma Kumari

Area
  - Total: 3,880 ha (9,600 acres)
- Elevation: 42 m (138 ft)

Population (2011)
  - Total: 14,374
  - Density: 370/km^{2} (959/sq mi)

Languages
  - Official: Telugu
- Time zone: UTC+5:30 (IST)
- PIN: 521190
- Area code: +91–8678
- Vehicle registration: AP

Penuganchiprolu is a village situated in the NTR district of Andhra Pradesh, India. Serving as the mandal headquarters for Penuganchiprolu mandal, it falls under the administration of the Nandigama revenue division. It is situated 71 kilometers northwest of the district headquarters, Vijayawada, and 50 kilometers south of the nearest city, Khammam.

Notably, Penuganchiprolu is home to Sri Tirupatamma Ammavari Devastanam, a temple with origins dating back to the 17th century, adding cultural and historical significance to the village. In addition, a 13th century Shambulingeshwara Swami temple at Nawabupeta village near Penuganchiprolu was built during the Kakatiya period, further enriching the region's history.

== Politics ==
Penuganchiprolu is centrally governed by the Penuganchiprolu Gram Panchayat, overseeing local administration in the area. Penuganchiprolu mandal, which includes Penuganchiprolu, forms a segment of the Nandigama Assembly constituency. This assembly constituency is further aligned with the broader Vijayawada Lok Sabha constituency.

== Demographics ==
According to the 2011 census of India, the village is 14,374, with 7,098 males and 7,276 females. The village has a significant Scheduled Castes population of 3,659, with 1,855 males and 1,804 females. The Scheduled Tribes population is 326, comprising 162 males and 164 females. In terms of literacy, 8,684 individuals in the village are literate, with 4,864 males and 3,820 females. On the other hand, 5,690 individuals are illiterate, including 2,234 males and 3,456 females. In the workforce, there are a total of 7,782 workers in the village, with 4,232 males and 3,550 females. Meanwhile, there are 6,592 non-workers, including 2,866 males and 3,726 females.

== Transport ==
Penuganchiprolu is the reachable place to 3 districts Krishna(Vijaywada), Suryapet(Kodad), Khammam(khammam).

== Notable people ==
- Duggirala Gopalakrishnayya - Indian freedom fighter
- Komarraju Venkata Lakshmana Rao - Historian
