= Akkapalem =

- Village
- Interactive map of Akkapalem
- Location in Andhra Pradesh, India Akkapalem (India)
- Coordinates: 17°08′N 80°35′E
- Country: India
- State: Andhra Pradesh
- District: NTR

Area
  - Total: 10.47 km^{2} (4.04 sq mi)

Population (2011)
  - Total: 1,494
  - Density: 142.7/km^{2} (369.6/sq mi)

Languages
  - Official: Telugu
- Time zone: UTC+5:30 (IST)
- PIN: 521235
- Telephone code: 08673
- Vehicle registration: AP 06
- Lok Sabha constituency: Vijayawada
- Vidhan Sabha constituency: Tiruvuru

Akkapalem is a village in NTR district of the Indian state of Andhra Pradesh. It is located in Tiruvuru mandal.

== Demographics ==
According to the 2011 Population Census, Akkapalem village has a total of 395 families with a population of 1,494, consisting of 747 males and 747 females. The Average Sex Ratio in Akkapalem is 1,000. Among the population, 11% are children aged 0–6 years, totaling 160, with 79 males and 81 females. In terms of literacy, Akkapalem has a 57% literacy rate, lower than the 66.6% in Krishna district. The male literacy rate is 63.17%, while the female literacy rate is 50.9%.
