= Kavuluru =

- Village
- Interactive map of Kavuluru
- Location in Andhra Pradesh, India Kavuluru (India)
- Coordinates: 16.63028°N 80.58278°E
- Country: India
- State: Andhra Pradesh
- District: NTR
- Elevation: 26 m (85 ft)

Languages
  - Official: Telugu
- Time zone: UTC+5:30 (IST)
- PIN: 521228
- Telephone code: 0866
- Vehicle registration: AP 16
- Lok Sabha constituency: Vijayawada
- Vidhan Sabha constituency: Mylavaram

Kavuluru is a village near Vijayawada and Kondapalli in the NTR district of Andhra Pradesh in India.
