= Pitcheswara Rao Atluri =

Indian writer (1925–1966)

- Born: 12 April 1925; Choutapalli, Krishna district, Andhra Pradesh
- Died: 26 September 1966 (aged 41)
- Occupation: writer
- Spouse: Chouda Rani

Pitcheswara Rao Atluri (12 April 1925 – 26 September 1966) was an Indian writer, who wrote in the Telugu language.

== Early life ==
Pitcheswara Rao was born in the small village of Choutapalli in Krishna district, Andhra Pradesh on 12 April 1925. Later, his family migrated to the nearby village, Pulaparru. He did his schooling in Choutapalli and Kaikaluru. As a student, he stood first in the Hindi 'Visharada' exams. After completing his pre-university education in the Hindu College, Machilipatnam, he joined the Indian Navy in 1945 as a Mechanical Engineer. He left the Indian Navy in 1953.

After leaving Indian Navy, Pitcheswara Rao worked as a journalist in "Vishalandhra" a Telugu daily newspaper for a few years. In 1962, he moved to Madras, and worked as a screenwriter for Telugu films. During this period, he also established himself as a Telugu writer, and wrote several short stories, radio plays and sketches. He also translated literary works from Russian and Hindi into Telugu. He died of heart attack in 1966.

Pitcheswara Rao's wife, Chouda Rani, was the youngest daughter of Tripuraneni Ramaswamy, a well known Telugu poet and social reformer. Chouda Rani herself was a short story writer, and novelist. She established an exclusive Telugu bookstore in Madras which ran successfully for several years. She died in 1996.

== Writings ==
Pitcheswara Rao was a multi-faceted writer. He wrote short stories, movie scripts, and translations from Hindi, and Russian to Telugu.

- "Manasulo manishi: Radio natikalu, eka vakchitranalu" (Radio Plays), 1968.
- "Vinnavi, Kannavi" (1968)
- Atluri Pitcheswara Rao Kathalu, a collection of short stories, 2021.

Translations from Russian.

- Paris pathanam (Orig: "The Fall of Paris" by Ilya Ehrenberg).
- Adarsa jeevulu (Orig: "Ivan Ivanovich" by Antonina Koptiaeva).
- Baagogulu (Original by Ilya Ehrenberg).
- Aparichita (Original by Galina Nikolaeva).
- Gajadonga Nikolai (Original by Ivan Albreht, a Slovenian author).

Translations from Hindi.

- Okanoka Gadida Atmakatha (Orig: "Ek Gadhe Ki Sarguzasht" by Krishan Chander).
- Godaan (Orig: "Godaan" by Munshi Premchand).
- Pekamukkalu (Original by Arigepudi Ramesh Choudhury)

Movie scripts released as books.

- Illarikam (1959).
- Krishna Leelalu (1959).
- Chivaraku Migiledi (1960)
- Nammina Bantu (1960).
- Baatasari (1961).
- Bharyabhartalu (1961).
- Vagdanam (1961).
- Atmabandhuvu (1962).
- Kodukulu-Kodallu (1963).
- Anubandhalu (1963).

Short stories

- Jeevachhavaalu
- Nethuru kadha
- Chiranjeevulu
- Gadavani Ninna
- Korina varam
- August 15na
- Verrikaadu Vedaantham
- Donkala vankala Manasulu
- Sastry
- Sabadham
- Kadhakudu
- Vimukti
- Gadachina dinnalu
- Brathakadam Theliyanivaadu
- Oka Anubhavam
