= Unguturu mandal, Krishna district =

Unguturu mandal
- Mandal
- Interactive Map Outlining mandal
- Location in Andhra Pradesh, India Unguturu mandal (India)
- Coordinates: 16°30′18″N 80°52′54″E
- Country: India
- State: Andhra Pradesh
- District: Krishna
- Mandal: Unguturu

Languages
  - Official: Telugu
- Time zone: UTC+5:30 (IST)
- Postal code: 521 XXX
- Vehicle registration: AP 16

Unguturu mandal is one of the 25 mandals in the Krishna district of the Indian state of Andhra Pradesh.

== See also ==
- Villages in Unguturu mandal
