= Chintalapadu, Tiruvuru mandal =

Chintalapadu
- Village
- Interactive map of Chintalapadu
- Location in Andhra Pradesh, India Chintalapadu (India)
- Coordinates: 17.026899°N 80.549298°E
- Country: India
- State: Andhra Pradesh
- District: NTR

Area
  - Total: 10.49 km^{2} (4.05 sq mi)

Population (2011)
  - Total: 3,032
  - Density: 289.0/km^{2} (748.6/sq mi)

Languages
  - Official: Telugu
- Time zone: UTC+5:30 (IST)
- PIN: 521235
- Telephone code: 08673
- Vehicle registration: AP–16

Chintalapadu is a village in NTR district of the Indian state of Andhra Pradesh. It is located in Tiruvuru mandal.

== Demographics ==
According to the 2011 Census in Chintalapadu, the total population stands at 3,032, comprising 1,536 males and 1,496 females, resulting in an Average Sex Ratio of 974. Literacy rate in Chintalapadu is 53.2%. The male literacy rate is 61.25%, while the female literacy rate is 44.96%.
