= Vakkalagadda =

- Village
- Interactive map of Vakkalagadda
- Location in Andhra Pradesh, India Vakkalagadda (India)
- Coordinates: 16.139620°N 80.919027°E
- Country: India
- State: Andhra Pradesh
- District: Krishna

Area
  - Total: 7.74 km^{2} (2.99 sq mi)

Population (2011)
  - Total: 3,012
  - Density: 389/km^{2} (1,010/sq mi)

Languages
  - Official: Telugu
- Time zone: UTC+5:30 (IST)
- PIN: 521126
- Telephone code: 08671
- Lok Sabha constituency: Machilipatnam
- Vidhan Sabha constituency: Avanigadda

Vakkalagadda is a village in Krishna district of the Indian state of Andhra Pradesh. It is located in Challapalli mandal of Machilipatnam revenue division. It is one of the villages in the mandal to be a part of Andhra Pradesh Capital Region.

It has a population of around 3200 with a literacy rate of 58.96%. It also has four schools, Panchayat Bhavan and a society building.

The village is mainly dependent on farming. This Village was under CPI rule for many years.

Later with the influence of Nandamuri Taraka Ramarao, Telugu Desam Party made its origin under the leadership of Mallupeddi Ratnagiri Rao.

Telugu Desam Party stood as a stiff contender for the existing leaders and in no time it secured the govt.

The village was awarded a Nirmal Gram award (cleanliness award) in 2008.

== Education ==
There are a 4 schools in vakkalagadda all are government schools, they are -

* 3 primary schools located as one in village and one in Gudem and another one in Doravani Gudem

* 1 High school located in village

== Demographics ==
It has a population of around 3200 with a literacy rate of 58.96%.
