= Yarlagadda =

- Village
- Interactive map of Yarlagadda
- Location in Andhra Pradesh, India Yarlagadda (India)
- Coordinates: 16.1373339°N 80.8938099°E
- Country: India
- State: Andhra Pradesh
- District: Krishna

Area
  - Total: 4.42 km^{2} (1.71 sq mi)

Population (2011)
  - Total: 1,640
  - Density: 371/km^{2} (961/sq mi)

Languages
  - Official: Telugu
- Time zone: UTC+5:30 (IST)
- Vehicle registration: Registration comes under Machilipatnam Circle (AP 16 AE)
- Nearest cities: Vijayawada, Machilipatnam
- Vidhan Sabha constituency: Avanigadda

Yarlagadda is a village in Krishna district of the Indian state of Andhra Pradesh. It is located in Challapalli mandal of Machilipatnam revenue division. It is one of the villages in the mandal to be a part of Andhra Pradesh Capital Region.

== Government and politics ==
Yarlagadda gram panchayat is the local self-government of the village. The elected members of the gram panchayat is headed by a sarpanch. The sarpanch of the villages was awarded Nirmala Grama Puraskaram for the year 2013.
