= Erramadu =

- Village
- Interactive map of Erramadu
- Location in Andhra Pradesh, India Erramadu (India)
- Coordinates: 17.1113735°N 80.6033639°E
- Country: India
- State: Andhra Pradesh
- District: NTR
- Mandal: Tiruvuru

Government
  - Body: Grama Panchayat

Area
  - Total: 7.43 km^{2} (2.87 sq mi)

Population (2011)
  - Total: 1,606
  - Density: 216/km^{2} (560/sq mi)

Languages
  - Official: Telugu
- Time zone: UTC+5:30 (IST)
- PIN: 521403
- Vehicle registration: AP 16

Erramadu is a village in NTR district of the Indian state of Andhra Pradesh. It is located in Tiruvuru mandal.
