= Vaivaka =

- Village
- Interactive map of Vaivaka
- Location in Andhra Pradesh, India Vaivaka (India)
- Coordinates: 16°25′32″N 81°14′54″E
- Country: India
- State: Andhra Pradesh
- District: Eluru

Languages
  - Official: Telugu
- Time zone: UTC+5:30 (IST)
- PIN: 521 329
- Telephone code: bsnl

Vaivaka is a village in Mudinepalli mandal in Eluru district in the Andhra Pradeshstate in India.

== Demographics ==
As of 2009 India census, Vaivaka had a population of 5000. Males constitute 50% of the population. Vaivaka has an average literacy rate of 60%.
