= Vellanki, Veerulapadu mandal =

Vellanki
- Village
- Interactive map of Vellanki
- Location within Andhra Pradesh
- Coordinates: 16°46′01.0″N 80°22′18.7″E
- Country: India
- State: Andhra Pradesh
- Region: NTR
- District: Krishna
- Mandal: Veerullapadu

Area
  - Total: 8.0 km^{2} (3.1 sq mi)
- Elevation: 0.61 m (2 ft)

Population (2011)
  - Total: 2,887

Languages
  - Official: Telugu
- Time zone: UTC+5:30 (IST)
- PIN: 521 181
- Telephone code: +91-8678-XXX XXX
- Vehicle registration: AP 16
- Lok Sabha: Vijayawada (Lok Sabha constituency)
- Vidhan Sabha: Nandigama (SC) (Assembly constituency)
- Precipitation: 603 millimetres (23.7 in)
- Avg. annual temperature: 28.6 °C (83.5 °F)
- Avg. summer temperature: 40.9 °C (105.6 °F)
- Avg. winter temperature: 25.3 °C (77.5 °F)
- Fourth most populous Village in Veerullapadu Mandal

Vellanki is a village located in NTR district in the state of Andhra Pradesh, India.

== Demographics ==
The population of Vellanki is 2887 as per 2011 census of India. Literacy level is 58% and agricultural labor is 40% of total population of the village.

The crime rate is unknown, although there was an incident from February 2018 to October 2019 where a serial killer known as "Vellanki Simhadri" murdered 10 people using fake medicine and cyanide-laced religious offerings.
