= Unguturu, Krishna district =

Unguturu
- Village
- Interactive map of Unguturu
- Location in Andhra Pradesh, India Unguturu (India)
- Coordinates: 16°30′18″N 80°52′54″E
- Country: India
- State: Andhra Pradesh
- District: Krishna
- Mandal: Unguturu

Population (2011)
  - Total: 2,333

Languages
  - Official: Telugu
- Time zone: UTC+5:30 (IST)
- Postal code: 521 312
- Vehicle registration: AP 16

Unguturu is a village in Krishna district of the Indian state of Andhra Pradesh.

== Notable people ==
- Gudavalli Ramabrahmam (1898-1946), social reformer and Telugu film director
- Unguturu Venkata Sitarama Anajaneyulu (1947 - 2011), Founding members and General Manager SV Bhakti Channel (SVBC), Director Doordarsha Kendra Tirupati and President Tirupati Film Society. A noted personality in Tirupati who was the cause of SV Bhakti Channel today.
- Viswanatha Satyanarayana (1895-1976), Telugu author and poet
- Tripuraneni Ramaswamy (1887-1943), lawyer, playwright and reformer active among the Telugu-speaking people
- Tripuraneni Gopichand (1910-1962), Telugu short story writer, novelist, editor, essayist, playwright and film director
- Dr. Tripuraneni Venkateswara Rao (1930?-2007), literary critic, author of Tripuraneni Ramayanam, founder of Spartek Group
- Dr. Tripuraneni Hanuman Chowdary, founding chairman and managing director of Videsh Sanchar Nigam Limited (VSNL), India's international telecommunications corporation; founder of the Center for Telecommunications Management and Studies (CTMS)
- P. S. Ramamohan Rao (born 1934), politician, Governor of Tamil Nadu from 2002 to 2004, former Director General of Police of Andhra Pradesh
- Chinta Visweswara Rao, industrialist, chairman and managing director of Krishnapatnam Port Company

== See also ==
- Villages in Unguturu mandal
