= Pothareddy Palli =

- village
- Interactive map of Pothareddy Palli
- Location in Andhra Pradesh, India
- Country: India
- State: Andhra Pradesh
- District: Eluru

Languages
  - Official: Telugu
- Time zone: UTC+5:30 (IST)
- Vehicle registration: AP

Pothureddy Palli is a village in Nuzvid mandal, located in Krishna of Andhra Pradesh, India.
