= Barrankula =

Barrankula Ganapeswarum
- Village
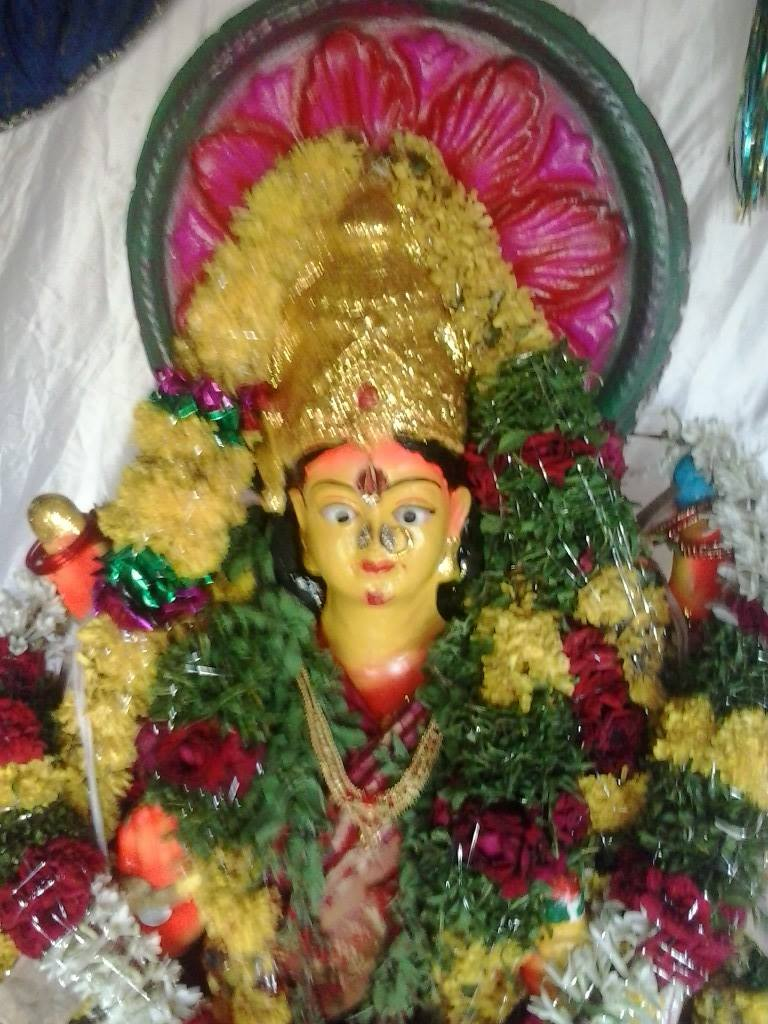
- Durga statue at Barrankula
- Interactive map of Barrankula
- Location in Andhra Pradesh, India
- Coordinates: 15°53′55″N 80°57′23″E
- Country: India
- State: Andhra Pradesh
- District: krishna

Area
  - Total: 6 km^{2} (2.3 sq mi)

Population
  - Total: 2,000

Languages
  - Official: Telugu
- Time zone: UTC+5:30 (IST)
- PIN: 521120
- Telephone code: 08671
- Nearest city: Machilipatnam, Avanigadda, Nagayalanka,

Barrankula is a small village in Nagayalanka mandal, Krishna district, Andhra Pradesh. This villages comes under Ganapeswarum Panchayat. The population is about 2,000.

== Arts and culture ==
Vijayadashami, Ganesh Chaturthi, Diwali, Hanuman Jayanti, Sri Ramanavami, Makara Sankranthi, and Ugadh celebrations are very popular in this village.

Religiously significant places include the temples in the village named:

1. Sri Anjaneya Swamy Temple
2. Sri Seetha Ramachandra swamy Temple
3. Ganganamma Temple (Village god)
4. Sri Urumulamma Temple
5. Sri Nagendrasway Temple
6. Sri Pothuraju Swamy Temple
