= Repudi =

- Village
- Interactive map of Repudi
- Location in Andhra Pradesh, India
- Coordinates: 16.268°N 80.239°E
- Country: India
- State: Andhra Pradesh
- District: Krishna
- Mandal: A.Konduru

Government
  - Type: Panchayati raj
  - Body: Pedanandipadu gram panchayat

Area
  - Total: 2,431 ha (6,010 acres)

Population (2011)
  - Total: 5,541
  - Density: 227.9/km^{2} (590.3/sq mi)

Languages
  - Official: Telugu
- Time zone: UTC+5:30 (IST)
- PIN: 522xxx
- Area code: +91–
- Vehicle registration: AP

Repudi is a panchayat village in Guntur district of Andhra Pradesh, India.

== See also ==
- Villages in Phirangi puram mandal
