= Lankapalle Agraharam =

Lankapalli Agraharam
- Village
- Interactive map of Lankapalli Agraharam
- Location in Andhra Pradesh, India
- Country: India
- State: Andhra Pradesh
- District: Krishna

Languages
  - Official: Telugu
- Time zone: UTC+5:30 (IST)
- Vehicle registration: AP 16

Lankapalli Agraharam is a village in Unguturu mandal, located in Krishna district of the Indian state of Andhra Pradesh.
