= Vavilala =

- Village
- Interactive map of Vavilala
- Coordinates: 17.0944°N 80.5361°E
- Country: India
- State: Andhra Pradesh
- District: NTR

Area
  - Total: 16.66 km^{2} (6.43 sq mi)

Population (2011)
  - Total: 4,057
  - Density: 243.5/km^{2} (630.7/sq mi)

Languages
  - Official: Telugu
- Time zone: UTC+5:30 (IST)
- PIN: 521235
- Telephone code: 08673
- Vehicle registration: AP 16
- Lok Sabha constituency: Vijayawada
- Vidhan Sabha constituency: Triruvuru

Vavilala is a village in NTR district of the Indian state of Andhra Pradesh. It is located in Tiruvuru mandal.
