= Machilipatnam (rural) =

- Village
- Interactive map of Machilipatnam
- Location in Andhra Pradesh, India Machilipatnam (India)
- Coordinates: 16°06′N 81°06′E
- Country: India
- State: Andhra Pradesh
- District: Krishna
- Mandal: Machilipatnam

Area
  - Total: 38.18 km^{2} (14.74 sq mi)

Population (2011)
  - Total: 570
  - Density: 15/km^{2} (39/sq mi)

Languages
  - Official: Telugu
- Time zone: UTC+5:30 (IST)

Machilipatnam (rural) is a village in Krishna district of the Indian state of Andhra Pradesh. It is located on the coast of Bay of Bengal in Machilipatnam mandal of Machilipatnam revenue division.

== Demographics ==
At the 2011 Census of India, Machilipatnam (rural) had a population of 570 (285 males and 285 females, a sex ratio of 1,000 females per 1,000 males). 52 children were in the age group of 0–6 years (28 boys and 24 girls, a ratio of 857 per 1,000). The average literacy rate stands at 81.08% with 420 literates, significantly higher than the state average of 67.41%.
