= Thummalapalle =

- Village
- Interactive map of Thummalapalle
- Location in Andhra Pradesh, India
- Country: India
- State: Andhra Pradesh
- District: Krishna

Area
  - Total: 8.64 km^{2} (3.34 sq mi)

Population (2011)
  - Total: 1,674
  - Density: 194/km^{2} (502/sq mi)

Languages
  - Official: Telugu
- Time zone: UTC+5:30 (IST)
- Vehicle registration: AP

Thummalapalle is a village in Krishna district of the Indian state of Andhra Pradesh. It is located in Nandivada mandal of Gudivada revenue division.
