= Mamidicolla =

- Village
- Interactive map of Mamidicolla
- Location in Andhra Pradesh, India Mamidicolla (India)
- Coordinates: 16.3362°N 81.0438°E
- Country: India
- State: Andhra Pradesh
- District: Krishna

Area
  - Total: 1.47 km^{2} (0.57 sq mi)

Population (2011)
  - Total: 529
  - Density: 360/km^{2} (932/sq mi)

Languages
  - Official: Telugu
- Time zone: UTC+5:30 (IST)
- Vehicle registration: AP

Mamidicolla is a village in Gudlavalleru mandal, located in Krishna district of Indian state of Andhra Pradesh.
