= Jaladheeswara Temple =

Jaladheeswara Swamy Temple, popularly known as Sree Balaparvati Sametha Jaladheeswara Aalayam, is in a village named Ghantasala in Krishna District, Andhra Pradesh, India. (16.16962°N 80.94436°E)

It is one of the more ancient temples, believed to exist before 2nd century A.D. The fact that Siva and Parvathi are placed on a single "peetam" (panavattamu) makes the temple different from many other ancient temples like Srisailam and Srikalahasti.

According to D. Kannababu, assistant superintendent, Archaeology Survey of India, "Jaladheeswara Temple was the fourth ancient temple in Andhra Pradesh. From the evidenced existing today, this temple existed before 2nd century A.D. This siva Lingam has similar features with some of the ancient temples like Gudimallam (Chittoor district near Sri Kalahasti), Amaravati, Draksharamam."

Salient features of the temple:

- It is the only temple in the world to have lords Siva and Parvati on a single peetam.
- According to the temple history, the peetam was placed by Sage Agastya.
- Nandeeshwara is more beautiful and realistic in this temple.
- According to Skanda Purana, this temple darshana has the same pious (punya phala) effect equivalent to Darshanam of Dwadasha Jyotirlingas (12) and Ashtadasa Shakti Peetams (18) due to the placement of Siva and Parvati on a single peetam.
- The devotees believe that Jaladeeshwara abhisheka theertham is a cure for many diseases.
