= Mudinepalli mandal =

Mandal in Eluru district, Andhra Pradesh, India

- Mandal
- Interactive Map Outlining mandal
- Location in Andhra Pradesh, India
- Coordinates: 16°25′20″N 81°06′43″E
- Country: India
- State: Andhra Pradesh
- District: Eluru
- Headquarters: Mudinepalli

Government
  - Body: Mandal Parishad

Languages
  - Official: Telugu
- Time zone: UTC+5:30 (IST)
- PIN: 521 XXX
- Vehicle registration: AP 16
- Website: http://www.mudinepalli.in/

Mudinepalli mandal is one of the 28 mandals in the Eluru district of the Indian state of Andhra Pradesh.

== Administration ==
Mudinepalli mandal is under the Kaikalur Assembly constituency of the Eluru Lok Sabha constituency.

== Towns and villages ==
Few of the Towns and Villages in Mudinepalli mandal are

Alluru
Annavaram
Chinna Palaparru
Dakaram
Devapudi
Devaram
Guraza
Kakaravada
Kamma Cheruvu
Koduru
Korraguntapalem
Mudinepalli
Mulakalapalli
Oldepalla
Peddha Palaparru
Peruru
Peyyeru
Vadali
Vandurru
Viswandapalem
