= Pendurru =

Coordinates: 16°23′N 81°18′E

- village
- Interactive map of Pendurru
- Country: India
- State: Andhra Pradesh
- District: Krishna

Area
  - Total: 7.15 km^{2} (2.76 sq mi)

Population (2011)
  - Total: 2,579
  - Density: 361/km^{2} (934/sq mi)

Languages
  - Official: Telugu
- Time zone: UTC+5:30 (IST)
- PIN: 521324
- Vehicle registration: AP-16

Pendurru is a village in Bantumilli mandal, located in the Indian state of Andhra Pradesh.
