= Tiruvuru =

- Town
- Interactive map of Tiruvuru
- Location in Andhra Pradesh, India
- Coordinates: 17°06′58″N 80°36′39″E
- Country: India
- State: Andhra Pradesh
- District: NTR district
- Mandal: Tiruvuru

Government
  - Type: Municipality
  - Chairman: M.Krishna Kumari
  - Municipal commissioner: K. Srikanth Reddy

Area
  - Total: 27.67 km^{2} (10.68 sq mi)

Population (2011)
  - Total: 18,567
  - Density: 671.0/km^{2} (1,738/sq mi)

Languages
  - Official: Telugu
- Time zone: UTC+5:30 (IST)
- PIN: 521235
- Telephone code: +91–8673
- Vehicle registration: AP–39
- Sex ratio: male:female=1000:1009 ♂/♀
- Literacy: 75.18%%
- Lok Sabha constituency: Vijayawada
- Assembly constituency: Tiruvuru (SC)

Tiruvuru is a town in NTR district of the Indian state of Andhra Pradesh. It is a Municipality in Tiruvuru mandal of Tiruvuru revenue division.

== Governance ==
Tiruvuru municipality is the civic administrative body of the town. It was constituted in the year 2011 and covers an area of 27.67 km^{2} (10.68 mi^{2}). The Municipality has a total of 20 wards, with seventeen wards reserved and three unreserved. The reserved wards include general and women reservations in SC, ST and BC. The municipal chairman is M.Krishna Kumari and vice chairman is S.Venkata Narasimha Rao.

=== Politics ===
Tiruvuru falls under the administration of Tiruvuru mandal and is represented by the Tiruvuru (SC) Assembly constituency, which in turn represents Andhra Pradesh's Vijayawada Lok Sabha constituency. 2024 the MLA representing Tiruvuru constituency is kolikapudi Srinivasa Rao from Telugu desam party.

== Demographics ==
The total population of Tiruvuru is 18,567, with 9,240 males and 9,327 females. This indicates a balanced sex ratio in the region.

Child Population: The child population of Tiruvuru is 1,617, with 867 males and 750 females.

Scheduled Castes and Tribes: The data shows that there are 2,652 Scheduled Caste members in Tiruvuru, with 1,286 males and 1,366 females. There are also 466 Scheduled Tribe members, with 223 males and 243 females.

Literacy: Out of the total population of Tiruvuru, 13,960 are literate, with 7,358 males and 6,602 females. The data indicates a higher literacy rate among males than females in the region. The literacy rate of Tiruvuru is 75.07%.

Illiterate: The data shows that there are 4,607 illiterate people in Tiruvuru, with 1,882 males and 2,725 females. This indicates that there are more illiterate females than males in the region.

Workers and Non-Workers: There are 7,122 workers in Tiruvuru, with 5,242 males and 1,880 females. This indicates that males have a higher percentage of workers than females in the region. There are also 11,445 non-workers, with 3,998 males and 7,447 females. This indicates that females have a higher percentage of non-workers than males in the region.

== Economy ==
Agriculture is the main occupation. The mango orchards are in abundant with Banginapalli, Totapuri varieties. These are exported to cities namely Dubai, Hongkong, London and Singapore.

== Transportation ==
Tiruvuru is well-connected to various parts of the country through roadways and railways. The town has an APSRTC bus depot that provides regular bus services connecting it to all major cities and far-off destinations.

Madhira railway station is the nearest railway station to Tiruvuru, which is located at a distance of around 38 km (23.6 mi) from the town. It is a small railway station that connects Tiruvuru to other parts of the state and the country. Many trains from Hyderabad, Vijayawada, and other major cities halt at Madhira railway station.

National Highway 30 (India), which connects Vijayawada in Andhra Pradesh to Sitarganj in Uttar Pradesh, passes through Tiruvuru. This highway plays a vital role in connecting the town to other major cities and states of the country. The town has a total road length of 114.00 km (70.84 mi), which includes both state highways and district roads.
