= Manimeswaram =

- Village
- Interactive map of Manimeswaram
- Location in Andhra Pradesh, India
- Country: India
- State: Andhra Pradesh
- District: Krishna
- Mandal: Bantumilli

Area
  - Total: 4.66 km^{2} (1.80 sq mi)

Population (2011)
  - Total: 1,571
  - Density: 337/km^{2} (873/sq mi)

Languages
  - Official: Telugu
- Time zone: UTC+5:30 (IST)
- PIN: 521369
- Parliament constituency: Machilipatnam
- Assembly constituency: Pedana

Manimeswaram is a village in Bantumilli mandal, located in Krishna district of the Indian state of Andhra Pradesh.
