= Dakaram =

Village in Andhra Pradesh, India

- Village
- Location in Andhra Pradesh, India Dakaram (India)
- Coordinates: 16°26′47″N 81°7′13″E
- Country: India
- State: Andhra Pradesh
- District: Eluru
- Mandal: Mudinepalle
- Elevation: 5 m (16 ft)

Population (2011)
  - Total: 696

Languages
  - Official: Telugu
- Time zone: UTC+5:30 (IST)
- PIN: 521325

Dakaram is a small village in the state of Andhra Pradesh, India, near Mudinepalli, Gudivada. As of 2011, it had a total population of 696.

== Geography ==
Dakaram is situated in the northern part of Eluru district, at an average altitude of 5 meters above the sea level. The village has a total land area of 385 hectares.

== Demographics ==
As per the 2011 census, Dakaram had a population of 696. The literacy rate of the village was 73.71%, with 279 of the male inhabitants and 234 of the female inhabitants being literate.
