= Pulaparru =

Coordinates: 6°34′37″N 81°10′45″E

Pulaparru is a village in Eluru district, Andhra Pradesh, India. It is part of the Mandavalli Mandal. The village has a population of 1914 people, spread over 491 households. The main occupation of the villagers is fish farming.
