= Veerullapadu mandal =

Veerullapadu Mandal
- Mandal
- Interactive Map Outlining Veerullapadu mandal
- Location in Andhra Pradesh, India
- Coordinates: 16.8199°N 80.3981°E
- Country: India
- State: Andhra Pradesh
- District: NTR
- Headquarters: Veerullapadu

Government
  - Body: Mandal Parishad

Languages
  - Official: Telugu
- Time zone: UTC+5:30 (IST)
- PIN: 521 XXX
- Vehicle registration: AP 16

Veerullapadu mandal is one of the 20 mandals in the NTR district of the Indian state of Andhra Pradesh. Its headquarters is located in Veerullapadu village.
