= Andhra Pradesh Capital Region =

Coordinates: 16°30′30″N 80°38′30″E

Andhra Pradesh Capital Region Āndhra Pradēś Rājadhāni Prāntaṁ
- Capital Region
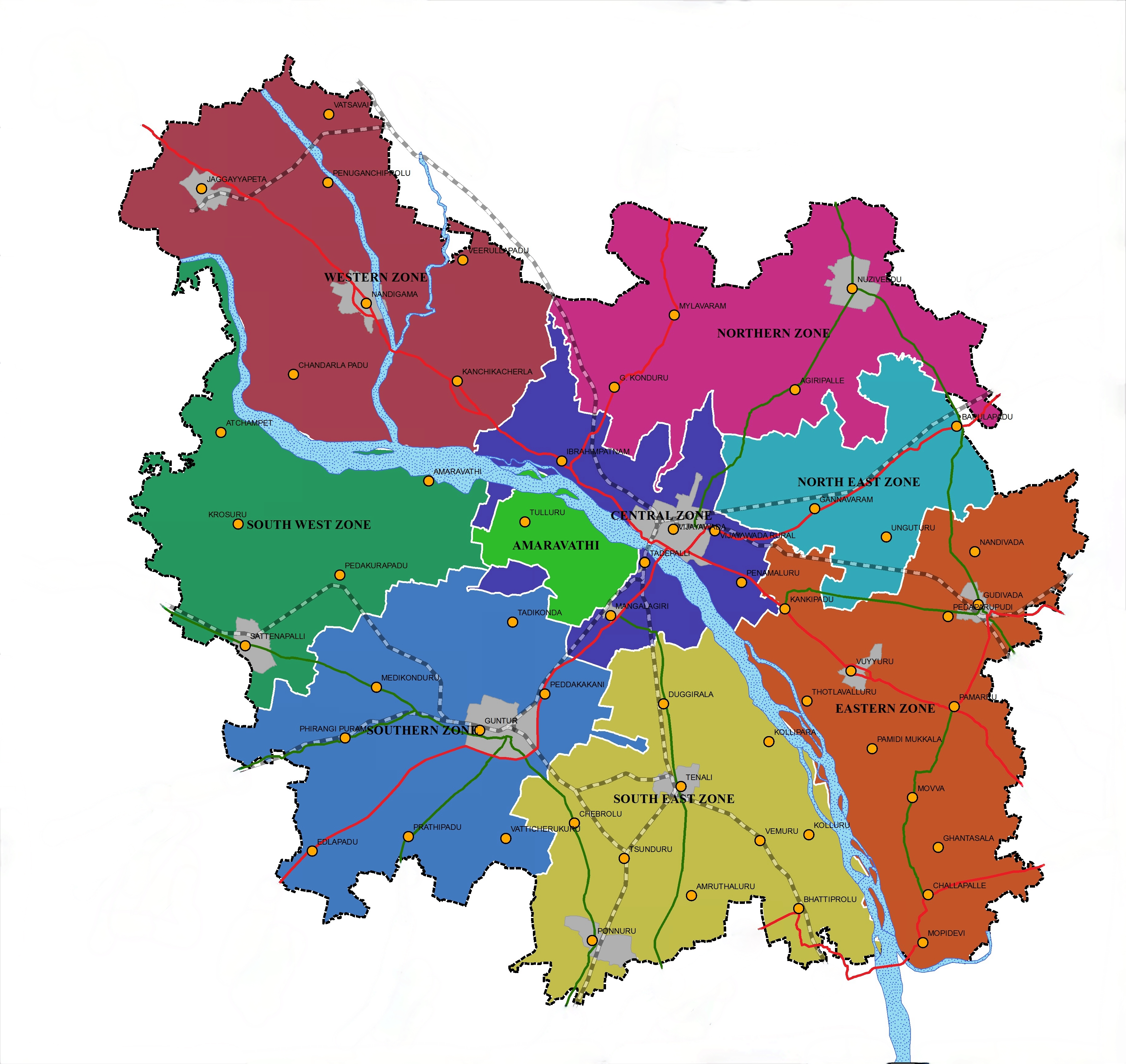
- Zonal map of Andhra Pradesh Capital Region with the city of Amaravati on the banks of River Krishna
- Interactive map of Andhra Pradesh Capital Region
- Country: India
- State: Andhra Pradesh
- Districts: Krishna; Guntur; NTR; Palnadu; Bapatla; Eluru
- Headquarters: Amaravati
- Created: 2014
- Founder: Government of Andhra Pradesh
- Major Cities and Towns: Vijayawada; Amaravati; Guntur; Tenali

Area
  - Total: 8,654.05 km^{2} (3,341.35 sq mi)

Population (2011)
  - Total: 5,873,588
  - Density: 678.710/km^{2} (1,757.85/sq mi)
- Time zone: UTC+5:30 (Indian Standard Time)
- Nominal GDP(2022-23): ₹188,502 crore (US$23.98 billion)
- GDP Contribution to state: 14.5%
- Website: APCRDA

Andhra Pradesh Capital Region (ISO: Āndhra Pradēś Rājadhāni Prāntaṁ) is the metropolitan area of the capital city of Andhra Pradesh in India. The region is spread across the districts of Krishna, Guntur, Palnadu, NTR, Bapatla and Eluru. It includes the major cities of Vijayawada and Guntur. Vijayawada is the largest city in the region. It is one the most populated metropolitan areas in Andhra Pradesh. The region is under the jurisdiction of Andhra Pradesh Capital Region Development Authority and covers an area of 8,603 km^{2} (3,322 sq mi) under 58 mandals. The capital city Amaravati is an urban notified area spanning 217.23 km^{2} (83.87 mi^{2}), within the Andhra Pradesh Capital Region.

== Background ==
After the bifurcation of United Andhra Pradesh, the newly formed Government of Andhra Pradesh constituted the Andhra Pradesh Capital Region Development Authority in 2014 and the Andhra Pradesh Capital Region was formed with a extent of 7,319 km^{2} (2,826 mi^{2}). The limits of the region was expanded on 22 September 2015, which resulted in addition and removal of the mandals and villages taking the total area to 8,603 km^{2} (3,322 mi^{2}). As of 1 August 2020, government of Andhra Pradesh proposed three capitals, which are Visakhapatnam as the executive capital, Amaravati as the legislative capital, and Kurnool as the judicial capital, but the process was cancelled and reverted back to the original 2014 plan of a singular capital city at Amaravati on 22 November 2021.

== Administration and Jurisdiction ==
The Andhra Pradesh Capital Region Development Authority is responsible for the administration and governance of the entire region under the Department of Municipal Administration and Urban Development of Andhra Pradesh.

The region is partially spread across 6 districts and subdivided into 8 zones for administrative purposes. It consists of 33 complete and 25 part mandals, totaling 58 mandals with 3 municipal corporations, 10 municipalities and 1006 gram panchayats spanning across 953 revenue villages.

Zone	District	Mandal
Amaravati	Guntur district	Thullur mandal
Western Zone	NTR district	Kanchikacherla mandal
Western Zone	NTR district	Veerullapadu mandal
Western Zone	NTR district	Nandigama mandal (Part)
Western Zone	NTR district	Chandarlapadu mandal (Part)
Western Zone	NTR district	Penuganchiprolu mandal (Part)
South West Zone	Palnadu district	Amaravati mandal
South West Zone	Palnadu district	Pedakurapadu mandal
South West Zone	Palnadu district	Krosuru mandal (Part)
South West Zone	Palnadu district	Sattenapalle mandal (Part)
South West Zone	Palnadu district	Atchampet mandal (Part)
South West Zone	Palnadu district	Muppalla mandal (part)
Southern Zone	Guntur district	Pedanandipadu mandal (Part)
Southern Zone	Guntur district	Tadikonda mandal
Southern Zone	Guntur district	Guntur mandal
Southern Zone	Guntur district	Medikonduru mandal
Southern Zone	Guntur district	Pedakakani mandal
Southern Zone	Guntur district	Vatticherukuru mandal
Southern Zone	Guntur district	Pratipadu mandal (Part)
Southern Zone	Guntur district	Phirangipuram mandal (Part)
Southern Zone	Palnadu district	Edlapadu mandal (Part)
Southern Zone	Palnadu district	Nadendla mandal (Part)
South East Zone	Guntur district	Duggirala mandal
South East Zone	Guntur district	Tenali mandal
South East Zone	Guntur district	Chebrolu mandal
South East Zone	Guntur district	Bhattiprolu mandal
South East Zone	Guntur district	Kollipara mandal
South East Zone	Guntur district	Tsunduru mandal
South East Zone	Guntur district	Ponnur mandal (Part)
South East Zone	Bapatla district	Vemuru mandal
South East Zone	Bapatla district	Kollur mandal
South East Zone	Bapatla district	Amruthaluru mandal
Central Zone	Guntur district	Tadepalle mandal
Central Zone	Guntur district	Mangalagiri mandal
Central Zone	NTR district	Vijayawada Rural mandal
Central Zone	NTR district	Vijayawada Urban mandal
Central Zone	NTR district	Ibrahimpatnam mandal
Central Zone	NTR district	Penamaluru mandal
Northern Zone	NTR district	G. Konduru mandal
Northern Zone	NTR district	Mylavaram mandal (Part)
Northern Zone	Eluru district	Agiripalli mandal
Northern Zone	Eluru district	Nuzividu mandal (Part)
North East Zone	Krishna district	Gannavaram mandal
North East Zone	Krishna district	Unguturu mandal
North East Zone	Krishna district	Bapulapadu mandal (Part)
Eastern Zone	Krishna district	Vuyyuru mandal
Eastern Zone	Krishna district	Kankipadu mandal
Eastern Zone	Krishna district	Pamidimukkala mandal
Eastern Zone	Krishna district	Thotlavalluru mandal
Eastern Zone	Krishna district	Pedaparupudi mandal
Eastern Zone	Krishna district	Gudlavalleru mandal (Part)
Eastern Zone	Krishna district	Nandivada mandal (Part)
Eastern Zone	Krishna district	Mopidevi mandal (Part)
Eastern Zone	Krishna district	Ghantasala mandal (Part)
Eastern Zone	Krishna district	Challapalli mandal (Part)
Eastern Zone	Krishna district	Pamarru mandal (Part)
Eastern Zone	Krishna district	Gudivada mandal (Part)
Eastern Zone	Krishna district	Movva mandal (Part)

== See also ==
- Andhra Pradesh Capital Region Development Authority
- List of mandals in Andhra Pradesh
