= Musunuru mandal =

Musunuru Mandal
- Mandal
- Interactive Map Outlining mandal
- Location in Andhra Pradesh, India
- Coordinates: 16.8260°N 80.9339°E
- Country: India
- State: Andhra Pradesh
- District: Eluru
- Headquarters: Musunuru

Government
  - Body: Mandal Parishad

Languages
  - Official: Telugu
- Time zone: UTC+5:30 (IST)
- PIN: 521 XXX
- Vehicle registration: AP 16

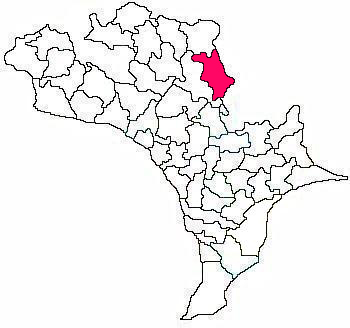
Map of Musunuru mandal

Musunuru mandal is one of the 28 mandals in the Eluru district of the Indian state of Andhra Pradesh.
