= Penuganchiprolu mandal =

Penuganchiprolu Mandal
- Mandal
- Interactive Map Outlining Penuganchiprolu mandal
- Location in Andhra Pradesh, India
- Coordinates: 16.9017°N 80.2475°E
- Country: India
- State: Andhra Pradesh
- District: NTR
- Headquarters: Penuganchiprolu

Government
  - Body: Mandal Parishad

Area
  - Total: 164.35 km^{2} (63.46 sq mi)

Population (2011)
  - Total: 51,811
  - Density: 315.25/km^{2} (816.49/sq mi)

Languages
  - Official: Telugu
- Time zone: UTC+5:30 (IST)
- PIN: 521 XXX
- Vehicle registration: AP 16

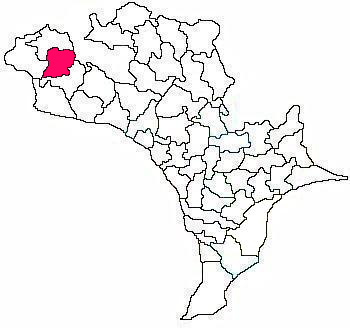
Penuganchiprolu mandal map

Penuganchiprolu mandal is one of the 20 mandals in the NTR district of the Indian state of Andhra Pradesh. It is known for Sri Lakshmi Tirupathamma Temple, located alongside the Muneru River. People from both states visit this devotional place on Fridays and Sundays. This village is also known for its farmers and profitable agriculture. It has one public police station, public hospital and public schools

== Villages ==
1. Anigandlapadu
2. Gummadidurru
3. Kollikulla
4. Konakanchi
5. Lingagudem
6. Muchintala @ Bodapadu
7. Mundlapadu
8. Nawabpeta
9. Penuganchiprolu
10. Sanagapadu
11. Subbayagudem
12. Thotacherla
13. Venkatapuram
