= G. Konduru mandal =

Gaddamanugu Konduru mandal G. Konduru mandal
- Mandal
- Interactive map of Gaddamanugu Konduru mandal
- Location in Andhra Pradesh, India
- Coordinates: 16.7638°N 80.6382°E
- Country: India
- State: Andhra Pradesh
- District: NTR
- Headquarters: Konduru

Government
  - Body: Mandal Parishad

Population (2011)
  - Total: 57,693

Languages
  - Official: Telugu
- Time zone: UTC+5:30 (IST)
- PIN: 521 XXX
- Vehicle registration: AP 16

Gaddamanugu Konduru mandal, commonly known as G. Konduru mandal, is one of the 20 mandals in the NTR district of the Indian state of Andhra Pradesh. It was used to be a part of Krishna district and was reorganized to be a part of newly formed NTR district on 4 April 2022.

== Villages ==
List of Villages in G Konduru

1. Atukuru
2. Bhimavarappadu
3. Chegireddipadu
4. Cheruvu Madhavaram
5. Chevuturu
6. Duggiralapadu
7. Gaddamanugu
8. Ganginenipalem
9. Gurrajupalem
10. Haveli Mutyalampadu
11. Kadimpothavaram
12. Kandulapadu
13. Kavuluru
14. Koduru
15. Konduru
16. Kuntamukkala
17. Loya
18. Munagapadu
19. Nandigama
20. Narasayagudem
21. Petrampadu
22. Pinapaka
23. Sunnampadu
24. Telladevarapadu
25. Velagaleru
26. Vellaturu
27. Venkatapuram
