= Chatrai mandal =

- Mandal
- Interactive map of Chatrai mandal
- Location in Andhra Pradesh, India
- Coordinates: 16.9946°N 80.8641°E
- Country: India
- State: Andhra Pradesh
- District: Eluru
- Headquarters: Chatrai

Government
  - Body: Mandal Parishad

Languages
  - Official: Telugu
- Time zone: UTC+5:30 (IST)
- PIN: 521 XXX
- Vehicle registration: AP 16

Chatrai mandal is one of the 28 mandals in the Eluru district of the Indian state of Andhra Pradesh. Garlapati uday kumar sir lives in this mandal since 2000 year.Chatrai mandal sharing Border with Telangana state.Tammileru River Situated in Chatrai mandal.
