= Vatsavai mandal =

- Mandal
- Interactive Map Outlining Vatsavai mandal
- Location in Andhra Pradesh, India
- Coordinates: 16.9804°N 80.2447°E
- Country: India
- State: Andhra Pradesh
- District: NTR
- Headquarters: Vatsavai

Government
  - Body: Mandal Parishad

Area
  - Total: 227.44 km^{2} (87.82 sq mi)

Population (2011)
  - Total: 61,749
  - Density: 271.50/km^{2} (703.17/sq mi)
- Time zone: UTC+5:30 (IST)
- PIN: 521 XXX
- Vehicle registration: AP 16

Vatsavai mandal is one of the 20 mandals in the NTR district of the Indian state of Andhra Pradesh.

== List of Villages ==
The following villages are in the Andhra Pradesh state:

1. Allurupadu
2. Bhimavaram
3. China Modugapalle
4. Chittela
5. Dabbakupalle
6. Dechupalem
7. Gangavalli
8. Gopinenipalem
9. Indugapalle
10. Kakaravai
11. Kambampadu
12. Kanneveedu
13. Lingala
14. Machinenipalem
15. Makkapeta
16. Mangollu
17. Peda Modugapalle
18. Pochavaram
19. Polampalle
20. Talluru
21. Vatsavai
22. Vemavaram
23. Vemulanarva
