= Nuzvid revenue division =

- revenue division in Eluru district
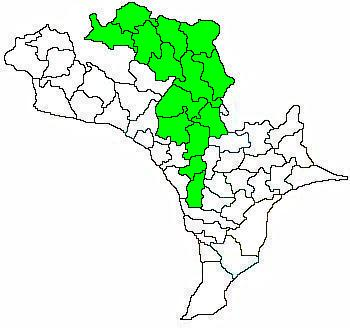
- Mandals in Nuzvid revenue division (in green) of Krishna district
- Country: India
- State: Andhra Pradesh
- District: Eluru

Nuzvid revenue division is an administrative division in the Eluru district of the Indian state of Andhra Pradesh. It is one of the 3 revenue divisions in the district with 6 mandals under its administration. Nuzvid serves as the headquarters of the division. The division has 1 municipality.

== Mandals ==
The mandals in the division are

No.	Mandals
1	Nuzvid mandal
2	Agiripalli mandal
3	Chatrai mandal
4	Musunuru mandal
5	Chintalapudi mandal
6	Lingapalem Mandal

== See also ==
- List of revenue divisions in Andhra Pradesh
- Machilipatnam revenue division
- Vijayawada revenue division
- Gudivada revenue division
