= Vijayawada revenue division =

- revenue division in NTR district
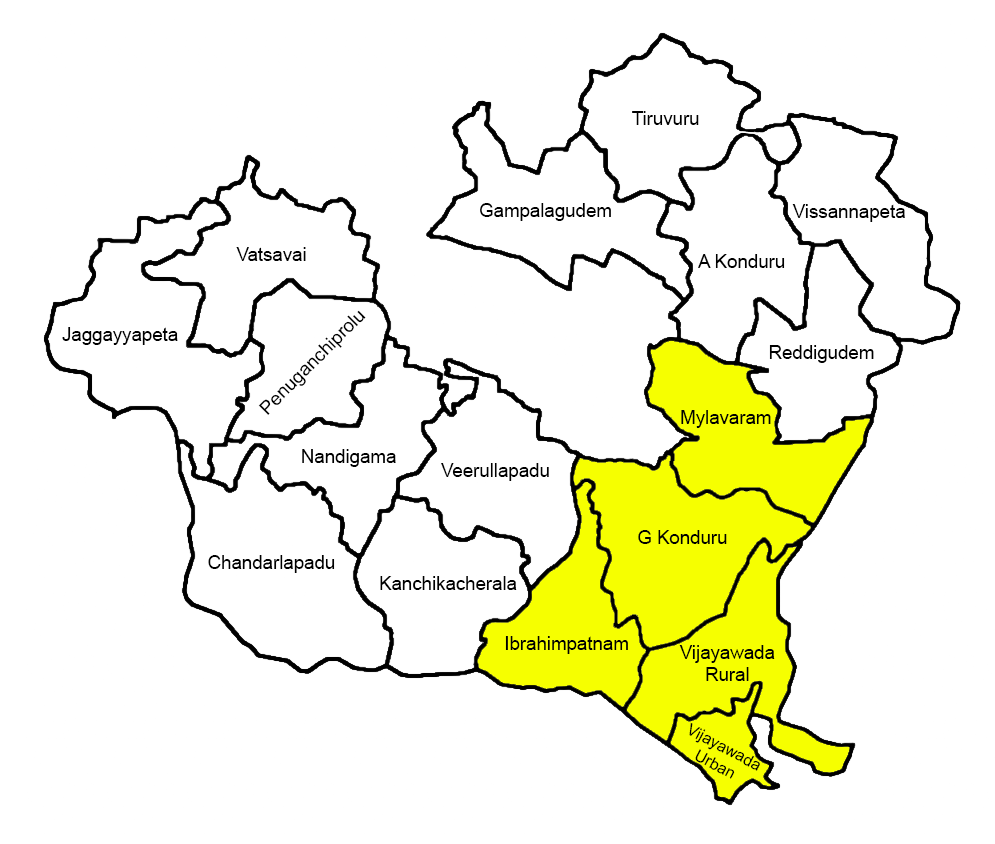
- Mandals in Vijayawada revenue division (in yellow) of NTR district
- Country: India
- State: Andhra Pradesh
- District: NTR
- Headquarters: Vijayawada
- Time zone: UTC+05:30 (IST)

Vijayawada revenue division (or Vijayawada division) is an administrative division in the NTR district of the Indian state of Andhra Pradesh. It is one of the 3 revenue divisions in the district with 8 mandals under its administration. Vijayawada serves as the headquarters of the division. The division has 1 municipality and 1 municipal corporation.

== Administration ==
The division is headed by a Revenue Divisional Officer(RDO). The mandals in the division are:

1. Ibrahimpatnam
2. G. Konduru
3. Mylavaram
4. Vijayawada Rural
5. Vijayawada Central
6. Vijayawada North
7. Vijayawada East
8. Vijayawada West

The division used to be a part of Krishna district until it was reorganised to form NTR district on 4 April 2022.

== See also ==
- List of mandals in Andhra Pradesh
