= NTR district =

District in Andhra Pradesh, India

- District in Andhra Pradesh
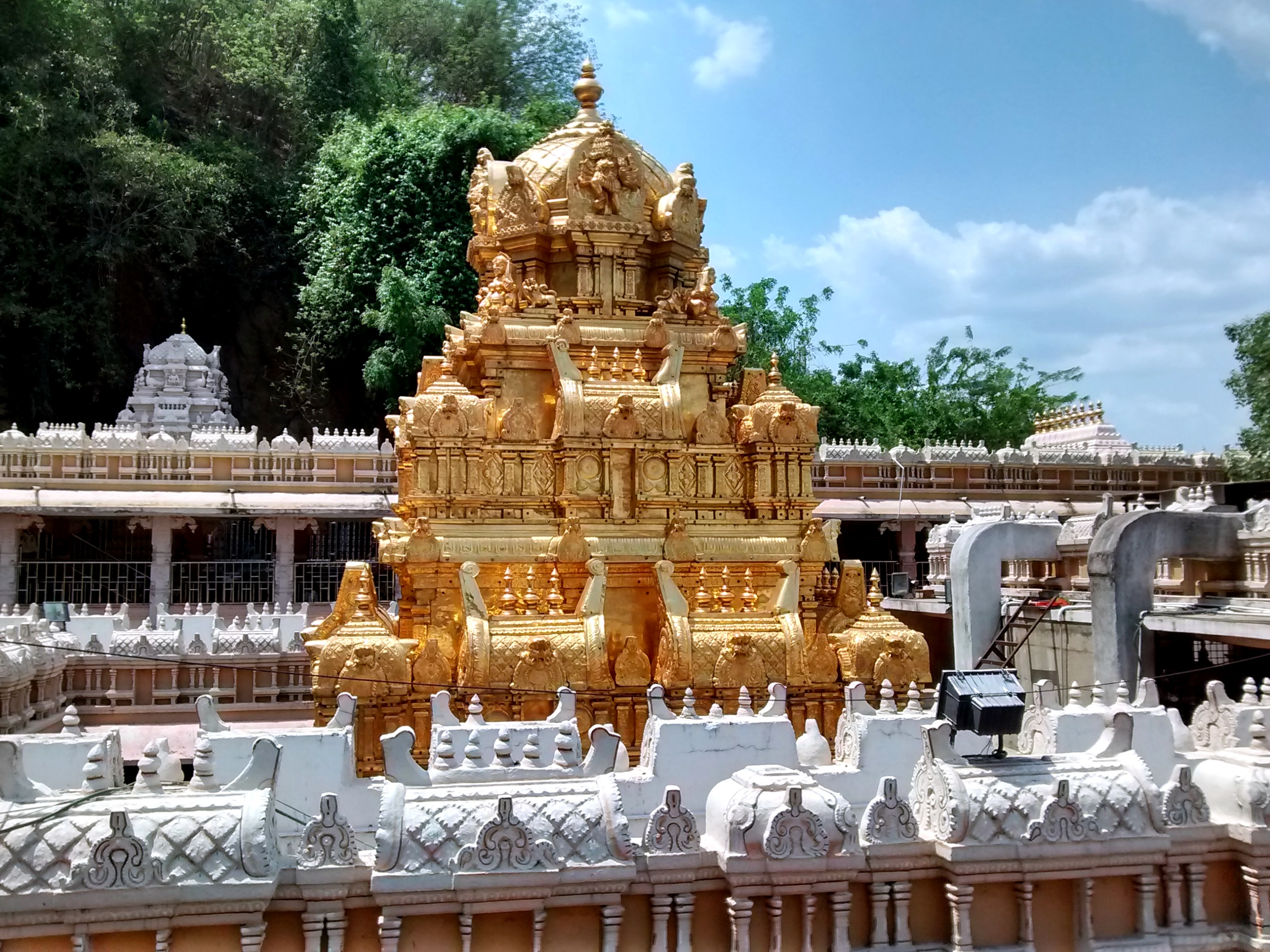
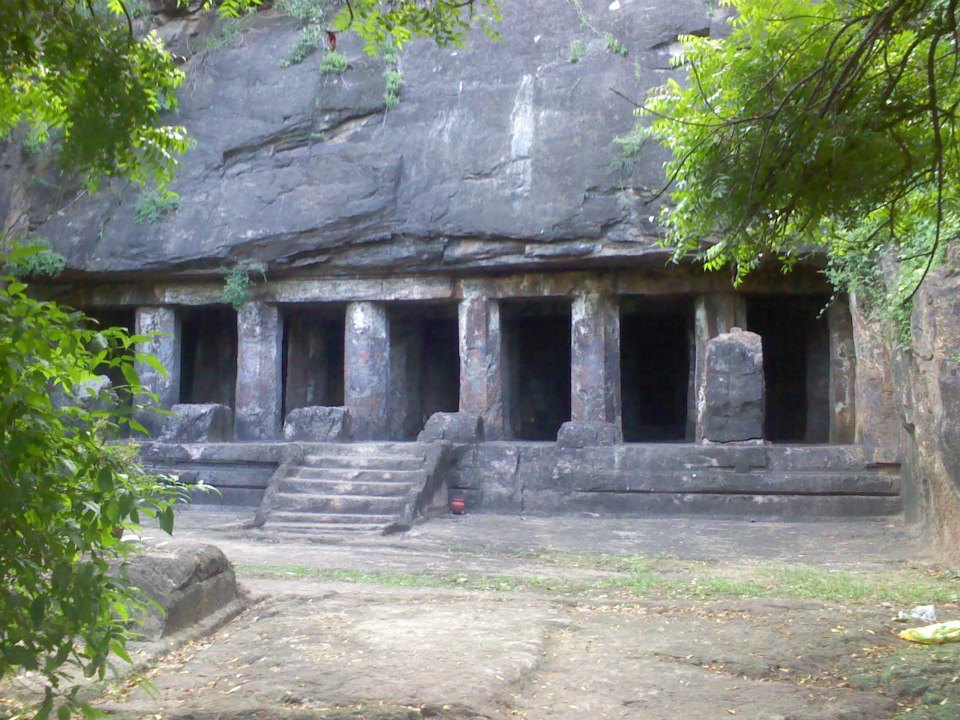
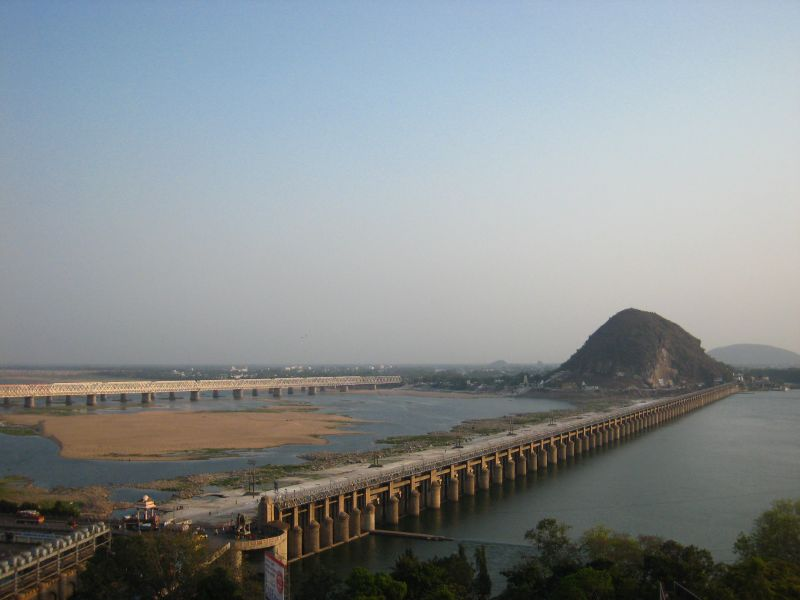
- Clockwise from top: Sri Kanaka Durga Temple, Prakasam Barrage and Akkanna Madanna Caves

- Location of NTR district in Andhra Pradesh
- Country: India
- State: Andhra Pradesh
- Region: Kosta Andhra
- Formed: 4 April 2022
- Founder: Government of Andhra Pradesh
- Named for: N. T. Rama Rao
- Headquarters: Vijayawada
- Administrative divisions: 03 revenue divisions; 20 mandals

Government
  - District collector and magistrate: G. Lakshmisha, I.A.S
  - Superintendent of Police: Kanthi Rana Tata IPS
  - Lok Sabha constituencies: 01
  - Assembly constituencies: 07

Area
  - Total: 3,316 km^{2} (1,280 sq mi)
  - Urban: 249.25 km^{2} (96.24 sq mi)

Population (2011)
  - Total: 2,218,591
  - Density: 669.1/km^{2} (1,733/sq mi)
  - Urban: 1,302,557
- Time zone: UTC+05:30 (IST)
- District LGD code: 749
- District abbreviation: TNR
- GDP (2022–23): ₹73,632 crore (equivalent to ₹800 billion or US$8.6 billion in 2026)
- Per capita income (2022–23): ₹335,324 (equivalent to ₹370,000 or US$3,900 in 2026)
- Website: ntr.ap.gov.in

NTR district is a district in coastal Andhra Region in the Indian state of Andhra Pradesh. The district headquarters is located at Vijayawada. The district is named after former Chief Minister of Andhra Pradesh N. T. Rama Rao. The district shares boundaries with Guntur, Palnadu, Krishna, Eluru of Andhra Pradesh. Khammam and Suryapet districts of Telangana also share border with this district.

== Etymology ==
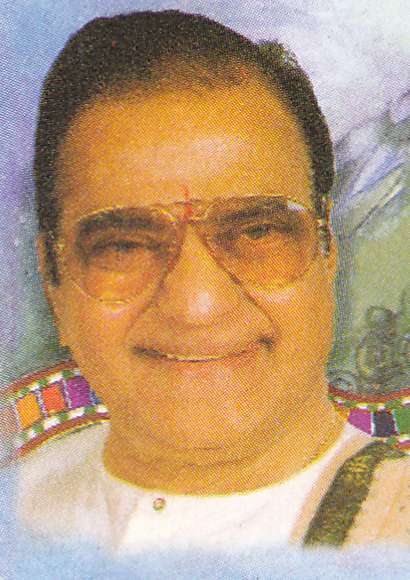
N. T. Rama Rao (NTR) Commemorative Stamp

The district was named in the memory of Nandamuri Taraka Rama Rao (NTR), a prominent figure in the history of Andhra Pradesh. NTR, a celebrated actor and politician. He was the founder of the Telugu Desam Party (TDP) and served as the chief minister of Andhra Pradesh. He is widely remembered for his groundbreaking welfare policies and his efforts to uplift the rural poor and marginalized communities.

== History ==
Y. S. Jagan Mohan Reddy while interacting with relatives of the TDP founder and former Chief Minister N. T. Rama Rao at Nimmakuru village in the Pamarru Assembly constituency as the opposition leader promised that he would name the district after the late leader. NTR district was proposed on 26 January 2022 and became one of the twenty-six districts in the state after the gazette notification was issued by the Government of Andhra Pradesh on 3 April 2022. On 4 April 2022 the chief minister Y. S. Jagan Mohan Reddy virtually inaugurated all 13 new districts, officially establishing NTR district., gazette notification. The district was carved out of Krishna district, with Vijayawada revenue division. Nandigama and Tiruvuru revenue divisions were formed along with the district.

== Geography ==
NTR district shares its borders with Krishna district and Eluru district on the east, Palnadu district and Guntur district on the south, Suryapet district of Telangana state on the west and Khammam district of Telangana state on the north.

The Krishna river flows towards east and acts as border with Palnadu district and Guntur district.

== Demographics ==
Religions in NTR district (2011)
Religion	Percent
Hinduism	88.30%
Islam	7.91%
Christianity	2.54%
Other or not stated	1.25%
Distribution of religions

Based on the 2011 census, NTR district has a population of 22,18,591, of which 1,302,557 (58.71%) live in urban areas. NTR district has a sex ratio of 991 females per 1000 males. Scheduled Castes and Scheduled Tribes made up 4,06,350 (18.32%) and 82,101 (3.70%) of the population respectively.

Languages of NTR district (2011)
1. Telugu (90.1%)
2. Urdu (6.90%)
3. Lambadi (1.43%)
4. Others (1.55%)

Based on the 2011 census, 90.12% of the population spoke Telugu, 6.90% Urdu and 1.43% Lambadi as their first language.

== Administrative divisions ==
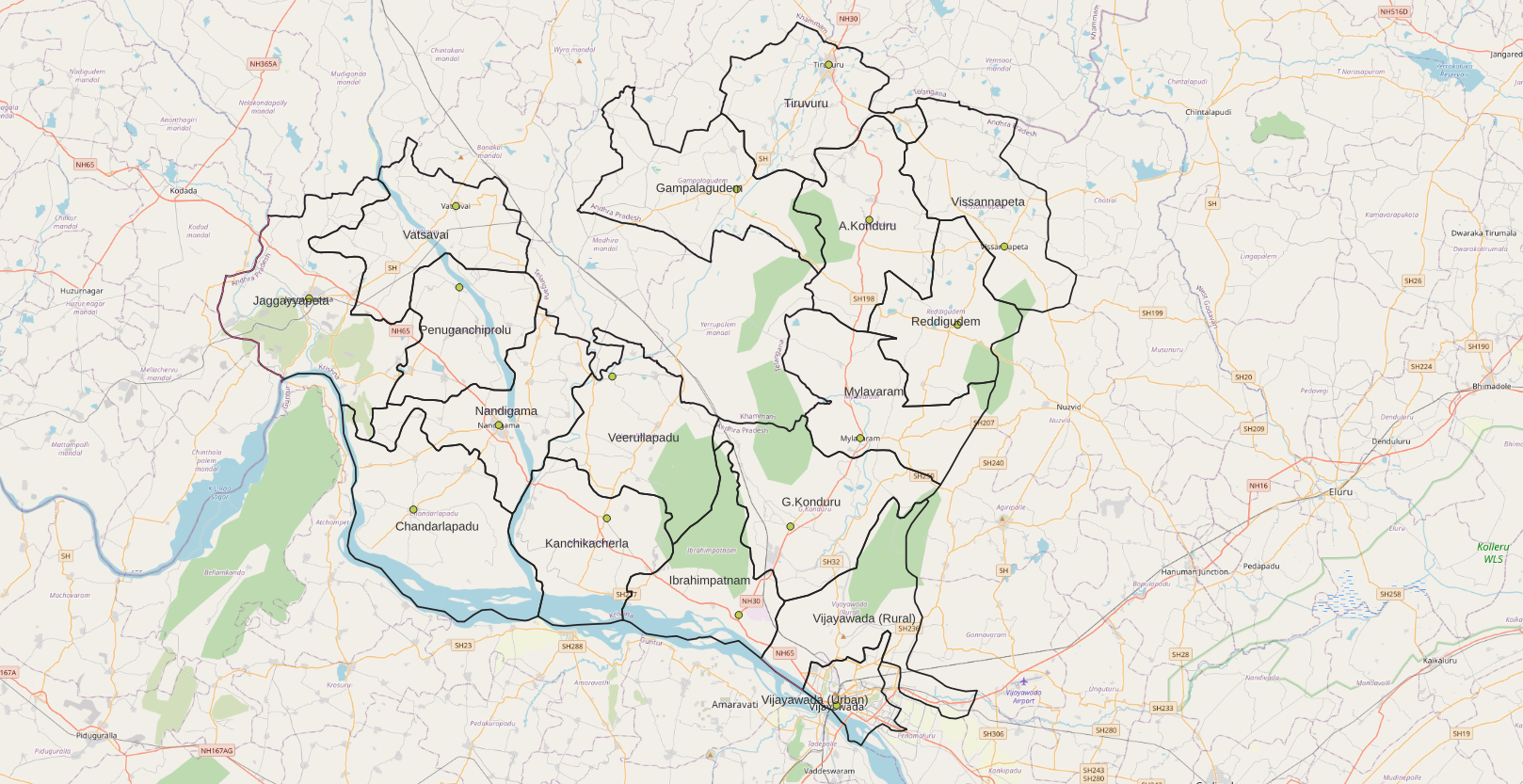
Satellite view of NTR district

The district is divided into three revenue divisions: Nandigama, Tiruvuru and Vijayawada, which are further subdivided into a total of twenty mandals.

=== Mandals ===
The list of 20 mandals in NTR district, divided into 3 revenue divisions, is given below.

1. Nandigama revenue division
  1. Chandarlapadu
  2. Jaggayyapeta
  3. Kanchikacherla
  4. Nandigama
  5. Penuganchiprolu
  6. Vatsavai
  7. Veerullapadu
2. Tiruvuru revenue division
  1. A. Konduru
  2. Gampalagudem
  3. Reddigudem
  4. Tiruvuru
  5. Vissannapeta
3. Vijayawada revenue division
  1. G. Konduru
  2. Ibrahimpatnam
  3. Mylavaram
  4. Vijayawada Rural
  5. Vijayawada Central
  6. Vijayawada North
  7. Vijayawada East
  8. Vijayawada West

== Cities and towns ==
The district has one municipal corporation, two municipalities, and two Nagar panchayats as per the district reorganization in 2022.

Cities and towns in NTR District
Ciy/Town	Civil status	Revenue Division	Population (2011)
Vijayawada	Municipal Corporation	Vijayawada	10,21,806
Jaggayyapeta	Municipality Grade 2	Nandigama	53,530
Kondapalli	Municipality Grade 3	Vijayawada	33,373
Nandigama	Nagar panchayat	Nandigama	44,359
Tiruvuru	Nagar panchayat	Tiruvuru	18,567

== Politics ==
The district is formed with the borders of Vijayawada Lok Sabha constitutency. There are seven assembly constituencies in the district.

Constituency number	Name	Reserved for: (SC; ST; None)	Parliament
69	Tiruvuru	SC	Vijayawada
71	Gannavaram (Part)	None	Machillipatnam
79	Vijayawada West	None	Vijayawada
80	Vijayawada Central	None	Vijayawada
81	Vijayawada East	None	Vijayawada
82	Mylavaram	None	Vijayawada
83	Nandigama	SC	Vijayawada
84	Jaggayyapeta	None	Vijayawada

== Education ==
Dr. NTR University of Health Sciences and School of Planning and Architecture are located in Vijayawada. The district has numerous engineering colleges including Prasad V. Potluri Siddhartha Institute of Technology, Velagapudi Ramakrishna Siddhartha Engineering College, Lakireddy Bali Reddy Engineering College, Gudlavalleru Engineering College, and DMS SVH College of Engineering.

SRR & CVR government degree college is one of the oldest colleges. It was established in 1937. Government polytechnic Vijayawada is also one of the oldest polytechnic colleges in India. Andhra Loyola College, AANM & VVRSR polytechnic college at Gudlavalleru, Mary Stella college, Sidhartha Degree College are a few of the many famous arts and science colleges in the district.

== Transportation ==
=== Road ===
National highways NH-65, NH-16, NH-30 pass through the district. APSRTC state headquarters are located at Vijayawada.

=== Railway ===
Vijayawada is headquarters for Vijayawada railway division and Vijayawada Junction is one of the busiest railway stations in India.

Other railway stations in the district (all are located in Vijayawada) are:

- Ramavarappadu
- Kondapalli
- Madhuranagar
- Rayanapadu
- Nidamanuru
- Gunadala
- Gangineni
- Cheruvu Madhavaram

=== Airport ===
Vijayawada Airport is located in the Gannavaram of Krishna district, which is suburb of Vijayawada.

== Tourism ==
Kondapalli Fort, Bhavani Island, and temples like Kanaka Durga Temple, Sri Tirupatamma Gopayya Swamivarla Devasthanam, Vedadri Lakshmi Narasimha Swamy Devasthanam, Srikakulandhra Mahavishnu Devasthanam, Ghantasala Jaladheeswara Temple, Mopidevi Subhramanyeswara Swamy Temple and Gunadala Matha Shrine are some of the major attractions.
