= Khammam (urban) mandal =

- Mandal
- Country: India
- State: Telangana
- District: Khammam district
- Headquarters: Khammam

Population (2011)
  - Total: 297,078

Languages
  - Official: Telugu
- Time zone: UTC+5:30 (IST)

Khammam (urban) mandal is one of the 46 mandals in Khammam district of the Indian state of Telangana. It is under the administration of Khammam revenue division and has its headquarters at Khammam. The mandal is bounded by Kamepalli, Enkuru, Konijerla, Khammam (rural) and Chintakani mandals.

== Government and politics ==
Khammam urban mandal is the only mandal under Khammam assembly constituency, which in turn represents Khammam lok sabha constituency of Telangana Legislative Assembly.

== Towns and villages ==
As of 2011 census, the mandal has 13 settlements. It includes 1 town and 12 villages.

The settlements in the mandal are listed below:

1. Ballepalle (CT)
2. Chimmapudi
3. Dhamsalapuram
4. Erlapudi
5. Khanapuram Haveli (CT)
6. Koya Chalka
7. Mallepalle Chinthagurthi
8. Manchugonda
9. Papadapalle
10. Raghunadha Palem
11. Regula Chalka
12. V.Venkatayapalem
13. Velugumatla
14. Vepakuntla

Note: M-Municipality, CT–Census town

== See also ==
- List of mandals in Telangana
