= Thimminenipalem =

- Village
- Nickname: Palem
- Location in Telangana, India
- Coordinates: 17°07′59″N 80°17′19″E
- Country: India
- State: Telangana
- District: Khammam

Government
  - Body: Grama Panchayat

Population (2009)
  - Total: 2,500

Languages
  - Official: Telugu
- Time zone: UTC+5:30 (IST)
- PIN: 507 208
- Telephone code: +91–8742
- Vehicle registration: AP–20
- Literacy: 65%

Thimminenipalem is a village in the Chintakani mandal of Khammam district in the state of Telangana, India. It is located on the banks of the Munneru river. The village is located 24 kilometres (15 mi) from the district headquarters of Khammam.
