= Khanapuram Haveli =

- Census Town
- Location in Telangana, India Khanapuram Haveli (India)
- Coordinates: 17.271908°N 80.179831°E
- Country: India
- State: Telangana
- District: Khammam
- Suburb: Khammam

Area
  - Total: 12.70 km^{2} (4.90 sq mi)

Population (2011)
  - Total: 53,442
  - Density: 4,208/km^{2} (10,900/sq mi)

Languages
  - Official: Telugu
- Time zone: UTC+5:30 (IST)
- PIN: 507 318
- Vehicle registration: TS-04
- Website: telangana.gov.in

Khanapuram Haveli is a census town in Khammam district of the Indian state of Telangana. It is located in Khammam (urban) mandal of Khammam revenue division. The town is a constituent of Khammam Urban Agglomeration.

== Demographics ==
As of 2011 census of India, Khanapuram Haveli had a population of 23,442. The total population constitute, 26,588 males and 26,854 females with a sex ratio of 1010 females per 1000 males. 5043 children are in the age group of 0–6 years with child sex ratio of 941 girls per 1000 boys. The average literacy rate stands at 88.21%.

== Transport ==
Khanapuram Haveli is well connected by road. Khammam bus station is the nearest bus station. State run APSRTC buses provides transport services to Khanapuram Haveli. Khammam railway station is the nearest railway station at a distance of 6 mi (9.7 km) which operates both passenger and freight services.
