= Lavudya Ramulu =

Indian politician

Lavudya Ramulu Naik (born 21 June 1955) is an Indian politician from Telangana state. He is a former member of the Telangana Legislative Assembly from the Wyra Assembly constituency which is reserved for Scheduled Tribe community in Khammam district. He contested and won as an independent candidate.

== Early life ==
Ramulu was born on 21 June 1955 to Balu in Bhojyathanda village, Julurupadu mandal, Papakollu revenue division, Khammam district. He is a retired sub-inspector of police. After working for 37 years in the police department, he joined the Congress party after retirement, but was denied a ticket. He completed his BA in 2018. He declared assets worth Rs.1 crore in his affidavit to the Election Commission of India.

== Career ==
Ramulu who joined the Congress after retirement and was denied the ticket to contest from Wyra seat twice, in 2014 and 2018, so he opted to contest as an independent in 2018. He won the Wyra Assembly constituency as an independent candidate in the 2018 Telangana Legislative Assembly election. He polled 52,650 votes and defeated his nearest rival, Banoth Madanlal, of the Telangana Rashtra Samithi, by a margin of 2,013 votes. He later joined the Bharat Rashtra Samithi.
