= Wyra Assembly constituency =

Constituency of the Telangana Legislative Assembly in India

Coordinates: 17.20°N 80.35°E

Wyra
- Constituency No. 115 for the Telangana Legislative Assembly
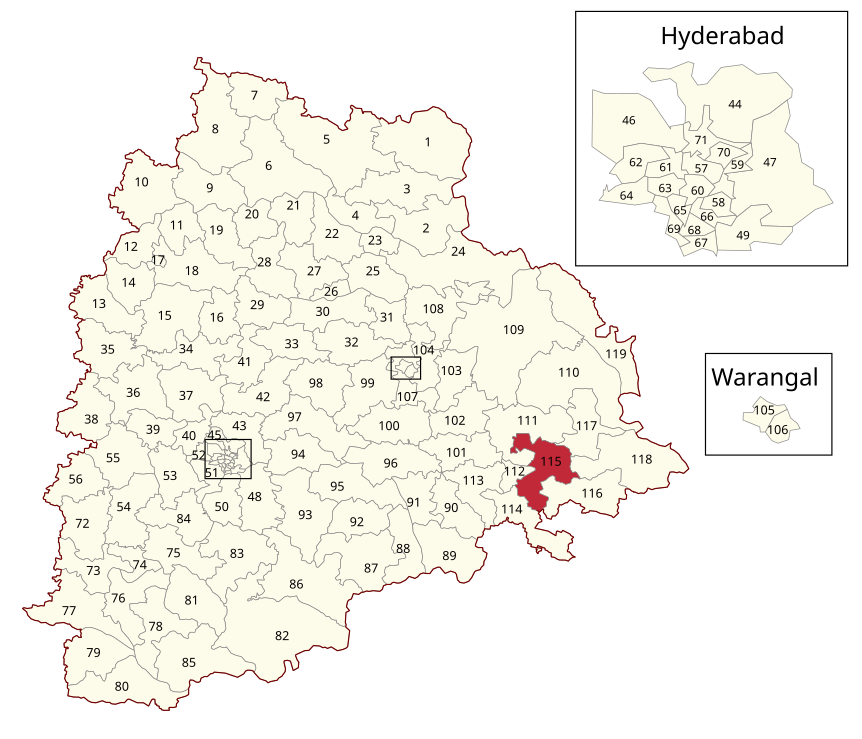
- Location of Wyra Assembly constituency within Telangana

Constituency details
- Country: India
- Region: South India
- State: Telangana
- District: Bhadradri Kothagudem, Khammam
- Lok Sabha constituency: Khammam
- Established: 2008
- Total electors: 184,840
- Reservation: ST

Member of Legislative Assembly
- 3rd Telangana Legislative Assembly
- Incumbent Maloth Ramdas Nayak
- Party: INC
- Elected year: 2023

Wyra Assembly constituency is a ST reserved constituency of Telangana Legislative Assembly, India. It is part of Khammam Lok Sabha constituency. Its number is 115.

In the 2018 Assembly elections, Lavudya Ramulu Nayak was elected as MLA as independent and joined in Bharat Rashtra Samithi.

In the 2023 Assembly elections, Ramdas Maloth was elected as MLA from Indian National Congress.

== Mandals ==
The Assembly Constituency presently comprises the following Mandals:

Mandal	District
Wyra	Khammam
Enkuru mandal	Khammam
Konijerla	Khammam
Singareni	Khammam
Julurpadu	Bhadradri Kothagudem

== Members of the Legislative Assembly ==
Andhra Pradesh
Year	Member	Party
United Andhra Pradesh
2009	Chandravathi Banoth	Communist Party of India
Telangana Legislative Assembly
2014	Banoth Madan Lal	YSR Congress Party
2018	Lavudya Ramulu	Independent
2023	Ramdas Maloth	Indian National Congress

== Election results ==
Vote share of Winning candidates
2023	55.44%
2018	33.36%
2014	40.35%
2009	41.77%

=== 2023 ===
2023 Telangana Legislative Assembly election: Wyra (ST)
Party	Candidate	Votes	%	±%
INC	Ramdas Maloth	93,913	55.44	New entry
BRS	Madanlal Banoth	60,868	35.93	▲3.85
CPI(M)	Bhukya Veerabhadram	4,439	2.62	▼4.59
JSP	Sampath Nayak	2,712	1.60	New entry
BSP	Rambabu Bhanothu	1,719	1.01	▲0.31
NOTA	None of the Above	1,230	0.73	▼0.77
IND	Guguloth Thavurya	1,145	0.68	Steady
IND	Ramulu Varsa	762	0.45	Steady
CPI(ML)L	Noonavath Veeru	99	0.06	New entry
OTH	4 Other Party Candidates	2,520	1.49	Steady
Majority		33,045	19.51	▲18.23
Turnout		169,407	87.66	
Swing to INC from Independent		Swing		

=== 2018 ===
2018 Telangana Legislative Assembly election: Wyra (ST)
Party	Candidate	Votes	%	±%
IND	Lavudya Ramulu	52,650	33.36	Steady
TRS	Banoth Madan Lal	50,637	32.08	▲26.84
CPI	Banoth Vijaya	32,757	20.75	▲2.34
CPI(M)	Bhukya Veerabhadram	11,373	7.21	New entry
IND	Varsa Ramulu	2,588	1.64	Steady
NOTA	None of the Above	2,360	1.50	▲0.88
BSP	Kishan Banoth	1,100	0.70	▲0.17
BJP	Reshma Bai Bhukya	1,025	0.65	
PPOI (Note: Pyramid Party of India)	Halavath Ramarao	996	0.63	▲0.06
IND	Guguloth Thavurya	897	0.57	Steady
IND	Malothu Mangilal Naik	629	0.40	Steady
BMUP	Lakavath Nageswara Rao	321	0.20	New entry
IND	Jarpula Prasad Naik	257	0.16	Steady
IND	Banoth Mangilal Nayak	254	0.16	Steady
Majority		2,013	1.28	▼5.92
Turnout		157,844	89.19	▲1.74
Swing to Independent from YSRCP		Swing		

=== 2014 ===
2014 Andhra Pradesh Legislative Assembly election: Wyra (ST)
Party	Candidate	Votes	%	±%
YSRCP	Banoth Madan Lal	59,318	40.35	New entry
TDP	Banoth Balaji	48,735	33.15	New entry
CPI	Dr. Narayana Moodu	27,071	18.41	▼23.36
TRS	Dr. Banoth Chandravathi	7,704	5.24	New entry
NOTA	None of the Above	912	0.62	New entry
PPOI	Bhukya Bhudesh	845	0.57	▼0.43
BSP	Banoth Venkatiya	781	0.53	▼1.06
IND	Bachala Laxmaiah	562	0.38	Steady
IND	Duggirala Srinivasa Rao	413	0.28	Steady
IND	Tejavath Narasimha Rao	387	0.26	Steady
JSP	Vasam Ramakrishna Dora	283	0.19	New entry
Majority		10,583	7.20	▼3.52
Turnout		147,011	87.45	
Swing to YSRCP from CPI		Swing		

=== 2009 ===
2009 Andhra Pradesh Legislative Assembly election: Wyra (ST)
Party	Candidate	Votes	%	±%
CPI	Chandravathi Banoth	53,090	41.77	New entry
INC	Dr. Bhukya Ramachandra Nayak	39,464	31.05	New entry
PRP	Banoth Vani Kumari	16,585	13.05	New entry
IND	Banoth Madanlal	5,551	4.37	Steady
TPPP (Note: Trilinga Praja Pragati Party)	Katta Venkateswarlu	3,058	2.41	New entry
BSP	Maloth Prasada Rao	2,024	1.59	New entry
LSP	Undadi Narender	1,471	1.16	New entry
PPOI	Katram Swamy	1,276	1.00	New entry
IND	Giribabu Lakavath	1,191	0.94	Steady
BJP	Eesala Venkateswarlu	1,172	0.92	New entry
IND	Guguloth Rambabu	1,064	0.84	Steady
IND	Banoth Mangilal Naik	612	0.48	Steady
IND	Banoth Kishan	536	0.42	Steady
Majority		13,626	10.72	New entry
Turnout		127,094		New entry
CPI win (new seat)				

== See also ==
- List of constituencies of the Telangana Legislative Assembly
