= Yerraboinapalli =

- Village
- Location within Telangana Location within India
- Coordinates: 17°8′9.94″N 80°31′32.54″E
- Country: India
- State: Telangana
- District: Khammam
- Mandal: Kalluru

Government
  - Type: Panchayathi Raj
  - Body: Grama panchayathi

Languages
  - Official: Telugu
- Time zone: UTC+5:30 (IST)
- PIN: 507 209
- Telephone code: +91-8761-XX XXXX

Yerraboinapalli is a village in Kalluru Mandal in Khammam District in Telangana State, India. Yerraboinapalli is located 10 km from its Mandal Main Town Kalluru. Yerraboinapalli includes Kottha Yerraboinapalli (locally called as Kotthuru) and Patha Yerraboinapalli (locally called as Paathuru).
