= Ammapalem =

- village
- Location in Telangana, India Ammapalem (India)
- Coordinates: 17°04′40.04″N 80°46′17.34″E
- Country: India
- State: Telangana
- District: Khammam

Languages
  - Official: Telugu
- Time zone: UTC+5:30 (IST)
- Vehicle registration: TS
- Website: telangana.gov.in

Ammapalem is a village in Konijerla of Khammam district in the state of Telangana, India.
