= Duddepudi =

- village
- Location in Telangana, India Duddepudi (India)
- Coordinates: 17.25°N 80.15°E
- Country: India
- State: Telangana
- District: Khammam

Languages
  - Official: Telugu
- Time zone: UTC+5:30 (IST)
- PIN: 507303
- Nearest city: Khammam
- Vidhan Sabha constituency: Khammam
- Website: telangana.gov.in

Duddepudi is a village in Konijerla mandal, Khammam district, Telangana, India.

== Demographics ==
As of 2011 Census of India, Duddepudi had a population of 1,559. There are about 485 families residing in the village according to the census 2011.
