= Remidicherla =

- Village
- Location in Telangana State, India Remidicherla (India)
- Coordinates: 16.7906°N 80.5023°E
- Country: India
- State: Telangana
- District: Khammam
- Talukas: Yerrupalem

Government
  - Type: Democratic
  - Body: Gram Panchayat
- Elevation: 56 m (184 ft)

Population
  - Total: 4,281

Languages
  - Official: Telugu
- Time zone: UTC+5:30 (IST)
- PIN: 507201
- Telephone code: 08749
- Vehicle registration: TS

Remidicherla is a small village in Yerrupalem Mandal of Khammam District. It is the second-most populated village in Yerrupalem Mandal.

== Transport ==
It is well-connected with Vijayawada and Khammam. The nearest railway station to the village is Yerrupalem Railway Station. There is good local transport system connected to village from Yerrupalem Railway Station and Bus stop.

== Demographics ==
According to the 2011 Census, 11% of the village is made up of children aged 0–6.

== Agriculture ==
The main crops cultivated in this area are cotton, spices and maize.

== Gallery ==
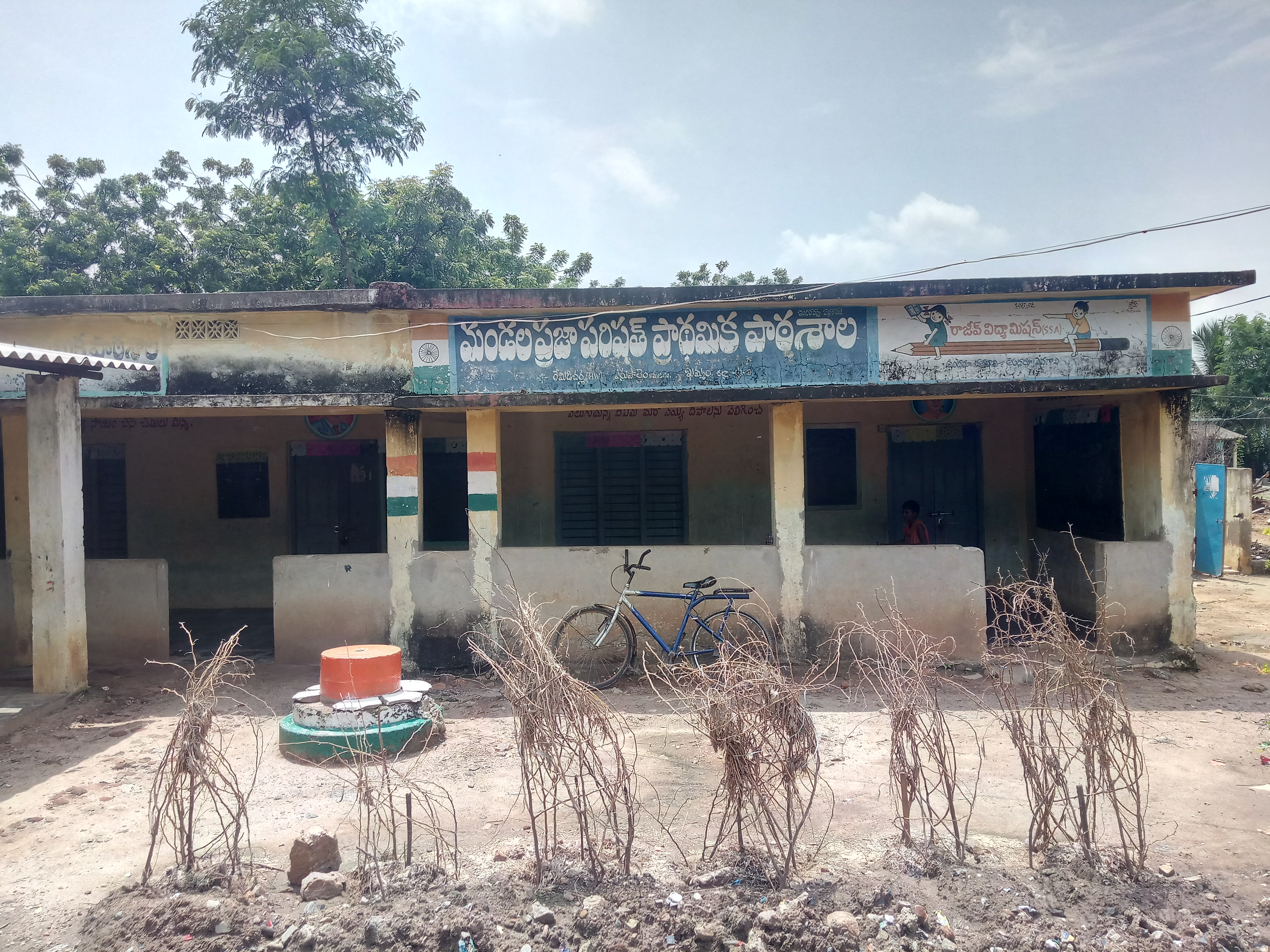
Mandal Praja Parishad School at Remidicherla Village of Yerrupalem Mandal.
