= Jasthipalli =

Village in Telangana, India

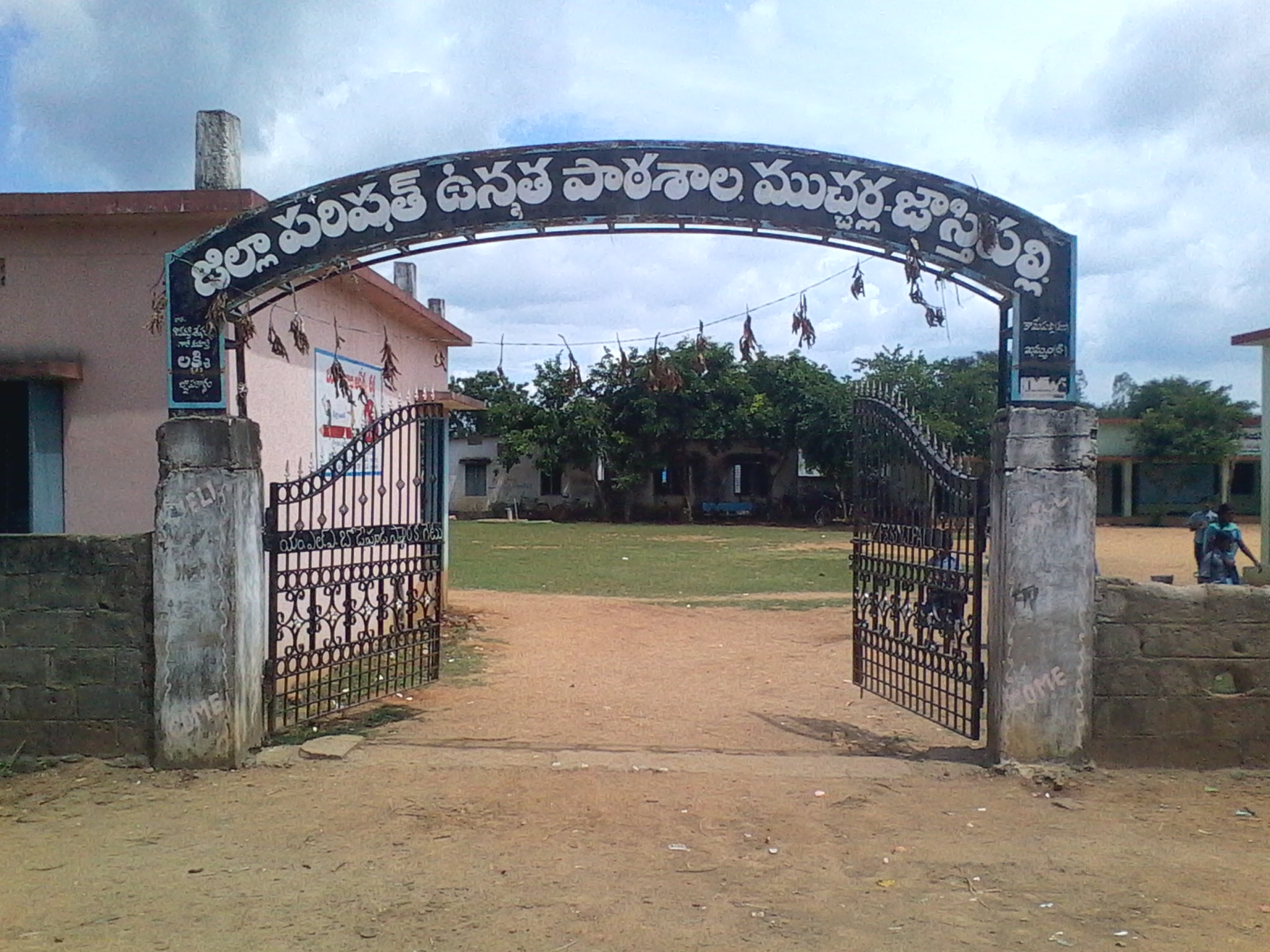
zpss on one fine day

Jasthipalli is a village in Kamepalli Mandal in the Khammam district in Telangana state of India. Jasthipalli is located nearly 26 km from its district headquarters Khammam. Jasthipalli is surrounded by Singareni Mandal towards the north, Dornakal Mandal towards the west, Garla Mandal towards the west, and Yellandu Mandal towards the north.

== Demographics ==
Telugu is the local language. The population of Jasthipalli is 3533. There are 1838 males and 1,695 females, living in 854 houses. The total area of Jasthipalli is 2142 hectares.
