= Khammam revenue division =

Coordinates: 17.1415°N 79.6236°E

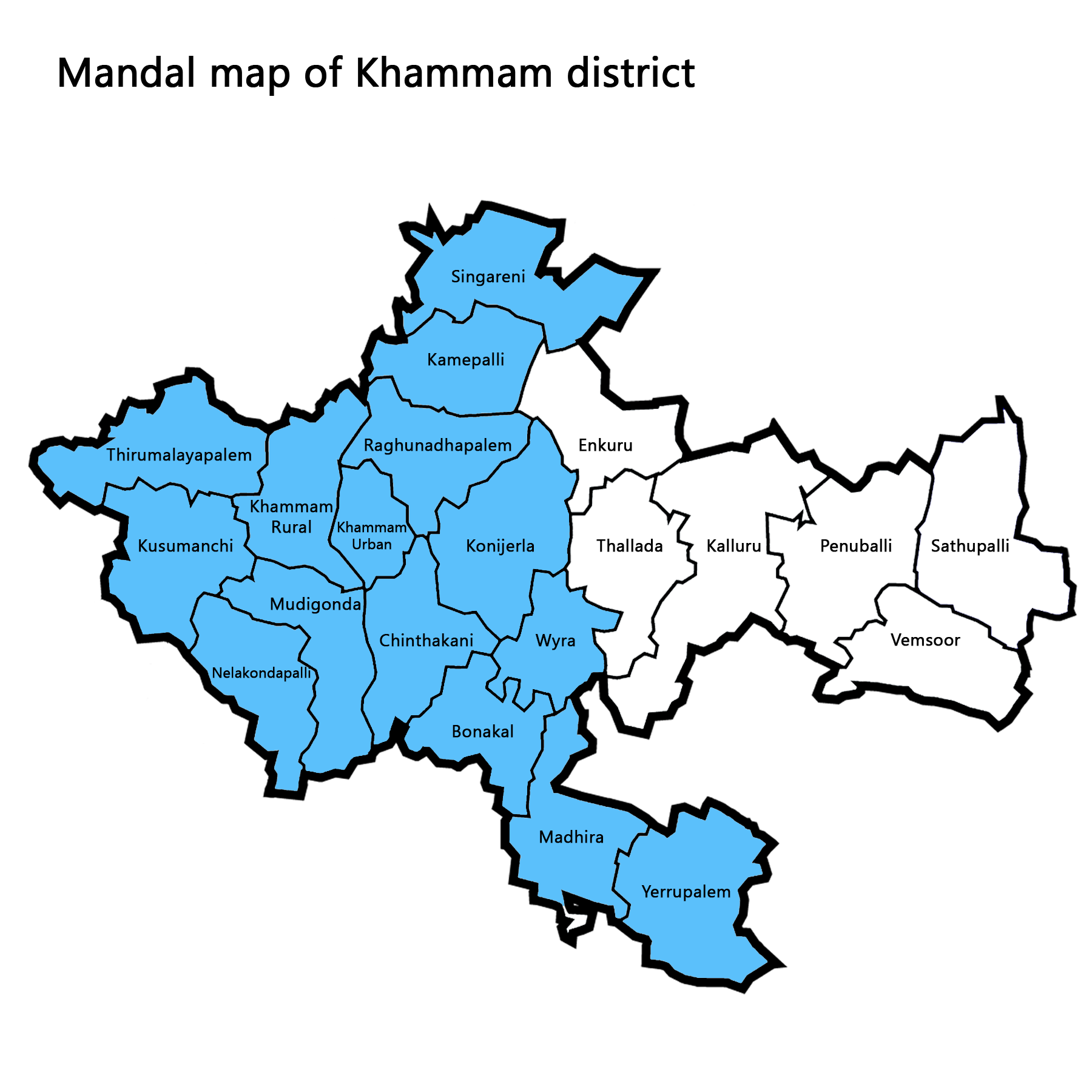
- Khammam revenue division in blue
- Interactive map of Khammam revenue division
- Country: India
- State: Telangana
- District: Khammam

Khammam revenue division (or Khammam division) is an administrative division in the Khammam district of the Indian state of Telangana. It is one of the 2 revenue divisions in the district which consists of 14 mandals under its administration. Khammam is the divisional headquarters of the division.

== History ==
The revenue division got modified on 11 October 2011, based on the re-organisation of the districts in the state.

== Administration ==
The present Revenue Divisional Officer (RDO) is Talluri Purnachandra. The mandals in the division are:

Serial No.	Mandals
1	Bonakal mandal
2	Chintakani mandal
3	Khammam (rural) mandal
4	Khammam (urban) mandal
5	Konijerla mandal
6	Kusumanchi mandal
7	Madhira mandal
8	Mudigonda mandal
9	Nelakondapalli mandal
10	Tirumalayapalem mandal
11	Wyra mandal
12	Yerrupalem mandal
13	Raghunadhapalem mandal
14	Singareni mandal
15	Kamepalli mandal

== See also ==
- List of revenue divisions in Telangana
- List of mandals in Telangana
