= Ramdas Maloth =

Indian politician

Ramdas Maloth (born 1965) is an Indian politician from Telangana State. He is an MLA from Wyra Assembly constituency which is reserved for ST community Khammam district. He represents Indian National Congress Party and won the 2023 Telangana Legislative Assembly election.

== Early life and education ==
Ramdas is born to Hanuma Maloth in Wyra. He completed intermediate in 1984 at KYKRY and BN Gouds Government Junior College, Kothagudem.

== Career ==
Ramdas won from Wyra Assembly constituency representing Indian National Congress in the 2023 Telangana Legislative Assembly election. He polled 93,913 votes, and defeated his nearest rival Banoth Madanlal of Bharat Rashtra Samithi by a margin of 33,045 votes.
