= Kappalabandham =

- Village
- Country: India
- State: Telangana
- District: Khammam

Languages
  - Official: Telugu
- Time zone: UTC+5:30 (IST)
- PIN: 507209
- Telephone code: 08761
- Vehicle registration: TS
- Website: telangana.gov.in

Kappalabandham is a village in the Khammam district, in the state of Telangana, India. It is located 3 km from its local Mandal at Kalluru.

== Demographics ==
Near kallur, Kallur is between Tallada and VM Banjer There are approximately 500 households in the village and surrounding area.

== Economy ==
The local economy is driven by agriculture, based primarily on cotton, rice, and sugar.
