= Payapur =

- Village
- Location in Telangana, India
- Coordinates: 18°33′N 80°24′E
- Country: India
- State: Andhra Pradesh
- District: Khammam

Languages
  - Official: Telugu
- Time zone: UTC+5:30 (IST)
- PIN: 507209
- Telephone code: 08761
- Vehicle registration: TS04

Payapur is a village in the Khammam district, in the state of Telangana, India. It is located 3 km from its local Mandal at Kalluru.

There are approximately 250 households in the village and surrounding area, and the village is dominated by the Golla/yadavs caste, a caste in the state. The local economy is driven by agriculture, based primarily on Paddy. The climate of the Payapur area is tropical, with hot summers and moderate winters, and is dry throughout the year. Annual mean daily maximum temperature is 38 °C, while minimum is 27.7 °C.
