= Parnasala (disambiguation) =

Parnasala is a village in the Indian state of Telangana.

Parnasala may also refer to:

- Parnasala of Santhigiri, a monument in the Santhigiri hermitage, Kerala, India
- Parnasala, Andaman, a village in Andaman Islands, India, see North Andaman Island
