= Mamunuru =

- Country: India
- State: Telangana
- District: Khammam
- Time zone: UTC+05:30 (IST)

Mamunuru is a small seaside village in Khammam district, Andhra Pradesh, India. In the village, there is a temple on the hills and a school built in 1935.
