= Enkuru =

Coordinates: 17°18′38″N 80°26′3″E

Enkuru is a village Grama Panchayat in Enkuru mandal, Khammam District of Telangana state. Enkuru grama panchayat consists of two villages i.e. Enkoor and Garloddu or Garlavoddu. The total area of this village grama panchayat is 742 Hectares. As per 2011 Census total 1712 families residing in this grama panchayat area. It has a population of 6428 of which 3328 are males while 3080 are females. This grama panchayat is administered by Sarpanch who is elected representative of village.
