= Kamepalli mandal =

Kamepalli కామేపల్లి Kamepally
- Mandal
- Location in Telangana, India Kamepalli (India)
- Coordinates: 17.45°N 80.26817°E
- Country: India
- State: Telangana
- District: Khammam

Languages
  - Official: Telugu
- Time zone: UTC+5:30 (IST)
- Vehicle registration: TS
- Vidhan Sabha constituency: Yellandu
- Climate: hot (Köppen)
- Website: telangana.gov.in

Kamepalli is a mandal in Khammam district in the Indian state of Telangana. It is located 30 kilometres (19 mi) from Khammam town.

== Villages ==
Villages in Kamepalli mandal:

- Vutukuru
- Ramakrishnapuram
- Gopala Puram
- marrigudem
- Thallagudem
- Pandithapuram
- Kotha Lingala
- Patha Lingala
- Mucherla
- Adavi Maddulapalli
- Captain Banajara
- Pinjaramadugu
- Errabodu
- Gadepadu
- Govindrala Banjara
- Joggudem
- Nemalipuri
- Satanigudem
- Ponnekal
- TekulThanda
- Barlagudem
- Harichandrapuram
- Manikyaram
- Jasthipalli
- JAGANNNADHATHANDA
- Basithnagar
- Lalyathanda
