= Chirunomula =

- village
- Location in Telangana, India Chirunomula (India)
- Coordinates: 17.02°N 80.23°E
- Country: India
- State: Telangana
- District: Khammam

Population (2003)
  - Total: 2,370

Languages
  - Official: Telugu
- Time zone: UTC+5:30 (IST)
- PIN: 507204
- Vehicle registration: TS

Chirunomula is a small village located in Bonakal Mandal of Khammam district, Telangana, India.

== Administration ==
Chirunomula is a village Panchayat under Bonakal intermediate Panchayat. The current elected Sarpanch of Chirunomula is Sakamuri Raja.

== Education ==
Chirunomula boasts of a High school which existed long before the Sub division Bonakal had a High school.
It has 2 primary schools

- Mandal Parishad Primary School
- Mandal Parishad Primary School for Scheduled Castes

The village has a literacy rate of around 51% according to 2001 census
