= Garlavoddu =

Coordinates: 17°18′31″N 80°26′10″E

Garlavoddu Garloddu
- Village
- Interactive map of Garlavoddu
- Country: India
- State: Telangana
- District: Khammam

Garlavoddu is a village in Enkuru mandal of Khammam district, Telangana.
