= Banoth Madanlal =

Indian politician (1963–2025)

Member of the Telangana Legislative Assembly for Wyra
- In office 2014–2018
- Preceded by: Banoth Chandravathi
- Succeeded by: Lavudya Ramulu Nayak

Personal details
- Born: 3 May 1963 Erlapudi, Khammam district, Andhra Pradesh, India
- Died: 27 May 2025 (aged 62) Hyderabad, Telangana, India
- Party: Telangana Rashtra Samithi; YSR Congress (until 2014)
- Spouse: Manjula
- Children: Two

Banoth Madanlal (3 May 1963 – 27 May 2025) was an Indian politician. He represented Wyra constituency in Khammam district. Earlier he was with YSR Congress Party. In 2014, he joined the Telangana Rashtra Samithi (TRS) party.

== Early life ==
Madanlal was born on 3 May 1963 in Erlapudi Village, Raghunadhapalem, Khammam to Mansingh. He completed a bachelor of arts degree from Govt S.R & B.G.N.R College, Khammam, affiliated with Osmania University.

== Political career ==
Banoth Madan Lal started his political career as Eerlapudi Sarpanch and later as an MPTC member and joined YSR Congress Party. He was a legislator in the Telangana Legislative Assembly from Wyra constituency between 2014 and 2018, as a member of the YSRCP. He defeated his nearest competitor Banoth Balaji and was elected as Member of the Legislative Assembly (MLA) with the highest majority of 59,318 votes. He quit the YSR Congress Party and joined Telangana Rashtra Samithi on 2 September 2014. Earlier he had contested as an Independent and lost. He contested the 2018 Elections in Telangana Rashtra Samithi and lost to Independent Candidate Lavudya Ramulu Nayak.

| Year | Constituency | Political Party | Result |
|---|---|---|---|
| 2009 | Wyra | Independent | Lost |
| 2014 | Wyra | YSR Congress Party | Won |
| 2018 | Wyra | Telangana Rashtra Samithi | Lost |
| 2023 | Wyra | Telangana Rashtra Samithi | Lost |

== Personal life and death ==
Madanlal was married to Manjula and had two children Mrugenderlal (IAS) and Manisha Laxmi.

Madanlal died of heart disease on 27 May 2025, at the age of 62.
