= Madhapuram =

- Village
- Location in Telangana State, India Madhapuram (India)
- Coordinates: 17°10′58″N 80°01′17″E
- Country: India
- State: Telangana
- District: Khammam

Languages
  - Official: Telugu
- Time zone: UTC+5:30 (IST)
- PIN: 507170
- Vehicle registration: AP-
- Nearest city: Khammam
- Literacy: 75%%
- Lok Sabha constituency: Khammam
- Climate: Normal (Köppen)
- Avg. summer temperature: 40 °C (104 °F)
- Avg. winter temperature: 25 °C (77 °F)
- Website: telangana.gov.in

Madhapuram is a small village located around 16 km from Khammam district headquarters in Telangana State, India, and 200 km from Hyderabad. The village is in the Mudigonda Mandal. It has a population of under 3000.

90% of the people are engaged in agriculture. The literacy rate is around 65%.

== Geography ==
Madhapuram is bounded by Kattakur Village to the east, Aregudam village to the north south/east, Rajeswarpuram village to the south, Nelapatla/Venkatapuram village to the west, Munigapalli Village to the north and Yedavalli to the north east.

== Demographics ==
- Households: 625
- Total population: 2,560
- Male population: 1,298
- Female population: 1,262
- Children under 6 yrs: 312
- Boys under 6 yrs: 167
- Girls under 6 yrs: 145
- Total literates: 1,300
- Total illiterates: 1,260
