= Anjanapuaram, Khammam district =

Coordinates: 17.299°N 80.3827°E

Anjanapuaram
- Village
- Interactive map of Anjanapuaram
- Country: India
- State: Andhra Pradesh
- District: Khammam

Population (2011)
  - Total: 966

Languages
  - Official: Telugu
- Time zone: UTC+5:30 (IST)
- PIN: 507165

Anjanapuram is a village in Konijerla mandal.
