= Seetharampuram =

- Village
- Location within Telangana Location within India
- Coordinates: 17.5241°N 80.3192°E
- Country: India
- State: Telangana
- District: Khammam
- Subdistrict: Aswapuram
- Time zone: UTC+05:30 (IST)
- Pincode: 507111

Seetharampuram is a small village in Aswapuram Mandal, Khammam District, Telangana, India.
