= Jannaram, Enkuru mandal =

Jannaram
- Village
- Country: India
- State: Telangana
- District: Khammam

Population (2011)
  - Total: 3,900

Languages
  - Official: Telugu
- Time zone: UTC+5:30 (IST)
- PIN: 507168

Jannaram is a populated major village in Enkuru mandal, with an area of 20.88 km^{2}.

Major source of income is agriculture and there's minor service activity. There is no commercial industry located in Jannaram.

== Demography of Jannaram ==
As of the 2011 Indian census, Jannaram had a population of 3,900. Males constitute 51% of the population and females 49%. Jannaram has an average literacy rate of 78.50%, greater than the Mandal average. In Jannaram, 10% of the population are under 6 years of age. Most of well educated people well settled in towns and most of people in different high positions in different places.
