= Sri Rama and Bhaktha Gentela Narayana Rao Government Degree College =

SR & BGNR Govt. Degree College (Autonomous)
- Established: 1956; 70 years ago
- Academic affiliations: Kakatiya University
- Principal: Prof. Mohammad Zakirullah
- Students: 5500
- Undergraduates: 4500
- Postgraduates: 1000
- Doctoral students: 0
- Location: Yellandu Road, Khammam, Telangana, 507002, India; 17.2542434°N 80.1605113°E
- Campus: Urban
- Language: Telugu and English Medium
- Website: gdcts.cgg.gov.in/khammam.edu
- Location within Telangana Location within India

Sri Rama and Bhaktha Gentela Narayana Rao Government Degree College (Autonomous) in short, SR&BGNR Degree College(A) is the major degree college in Khammam, Telangana offering Degree and Post graduate courses. Recently it is accredited with A++ with 3.64 CGPA in NAAC Accreditation that is highest in India for any Govt, Non-Professional, Multidisciplinary Degree College. There is no other Govt, Non-Professional, Multidisciplinary Degree College in entire India having A++ Grade. It is affiliated to Kakatiya University.

== History ==
Established in 1956, it acted as a major graduation place for the entire district of Khammam.

Before taking the decision of establishing this college, the government said there is a lack of funds for land acquisition and building the college. Then a committee said as it is degree college for Khammam District, to raise money go for auction of ornaments of Badhradri Rama which were made by Baktha Ramadasu.

Baktha Gentela Narayana Rao is a strong worshipper of Lord Sri Rama. This decision made him sorrow and said do not go for auction, "I will give my 200 acres land surrounded by Wyra Road and Yellandu road to the government for building Govt. Degree College." Later, the land is utilized for building District Court and its Quarters, Stadium, University PG College, Medicinal Park, etc.. Recently, it got A++ with 3.64 CGPA in NAAC Accreditation, that is highest in India for a Non-Professional, Government Multi-disciplinary Degree College

== Sports ==
The college campus ground was given away for the construction of Sardar Patel Stadium. This ground hosts major inter district and inter state sports events. The college organises various leadership programs under National Service Scheme(NSS).

== Archaeological research ==
The history department has made significant research in major megalithic sites around Khammam District. Some of the artifacts were hosted in the college. There was also a proposal to construct a museum. Prof KP Rao of University of Hyderabad has guided the research team to excavate Megalithic pottery.

== See also ==
- Education in India
- Literacy in India
- List of institutions of higher education in Telangana
