= Errupalem railway station =

Railway station in Telangana, India

Errupalem

General information
- Location: Yerrupalem, Khammam district, Telangana; India
- Coordinates: 16.824843°N 80.471671°E
- Elevation: 58 metres (190 ft)
- System: Indian Railways station
- Owner: Ministry of Railways, Indian Railways
- Operator: South Central Railway Zone
- Platforms: 2
- Tracks: 4

Construction
- Structure type: Standard (at ground)

Other information
- Status: Active
- Station code: YP
- Zone(s): South Central
- Division(s): Secundrabad
- Website: http://www.indianrailways.gov.in
Location
- Location within India Location within Telangana
- Interactive map

Erruppalem railway station (station code: YP) is a small railway station located in Yerrupalem, Khammam district of Telangana, India. The station consists of two platforms.

The station is located at an elevation of 58 meters above sea level. Erruppalem railway station is categorized as a Regular station and falls under the NSG-6 category. The station operates under the South Central Railway (SCR) zone and comes under the jurisdiction of the Secunderabad division.

The station is situated on the Kazipet-Vijayawada section of the New Delhi-Chennai main line. Erruppalem railway station serves as a halt for 10 trains but does not have any originating or terminating trains.

Preceding station	Indian Railways	Following station
Cheruvu Madhavaram towards ?	South Coast Railway zone Kazipet–Vijayawada section of Delhi–Chennai line	Kondapalli towards ?
