= Yerrupalem mandal =

- Mandal
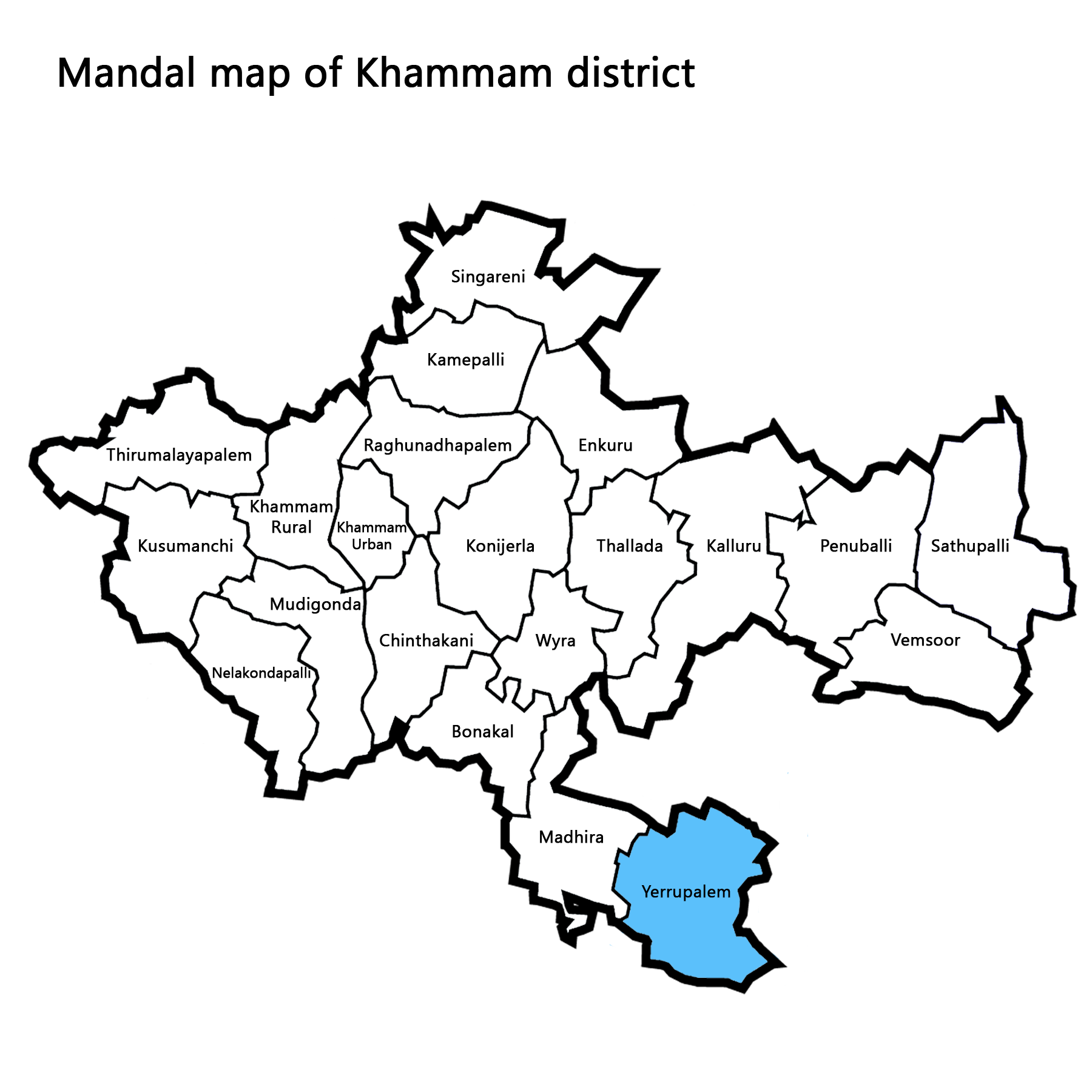
- Yerrupalem mandal highlighted in blue

- Location in Telangana, India
- Coordinates: 16.8333°N 80.4667°E
- Country: India
- State: Telangana
- District: Khammam
- Headquarters: Yerrupalem

Population (2011)
  - Total: 49,851

Languages
  - Official: Telugu
- Time zone: UTC+5:30 (IST)

Yerrupalem mandal is one of the 21 mandals (administrative divisions) located in the Khammam district of Telangana, India. It falls under the jurisdiction of the Khammam revenue division, with its headquarters situated in the village of Yerrupalem.

== Demographics ==
According to 2011 Census of India, Yerrupalem mandal has a population of 49,851, with 25,078 males and 24,773 females. The sub-district has 4,537 children, 14,095 individuals from Scheduled Castes, and 1,685 individuals from Scheduled Tribes. The literacy rate is 27,950, while the illiterate population is 21,901. There are 28,146 workers and 21,705 non-workers in the area.

== Villages in Yerrupalem mandal ==
1. Ayyavarigudem
2. Banigandlapadu
3. Bheemavaram
4. Choppakatlapalem
5. Gatla Gowraram
6. Gosaveedu
7. Guntupalle Gopavaram
8. Inagali
9. Jamalapuram
10. Kacharam
11. Kesireddipalle
12. Mamunuru
13. Meenavole
14. Mulugumadu
15. Pedda Goparam
16. Pegallapadu
17. Rajulapalem
18. Rangagudem
19. Remidicherla
20. Sakhina Veedu
21. Tatigudem
22. Thakkellapadu
23. Tripuraram
24. Yerrupalem - Mandal headquarters
