= Botlakunta =

Botlakunta is a small village located in konijerla mandal, khammam district, Telangana, India.

Mandal Name : Konijerla District : Khammam State : Telangana Region : Telangana Language : Telugu and English Time zone: IST (UTC+5:30) Elevation / Altitude: 107 meters. Above Sea level Telephone Code / Std Code:08749 Pin Code : 507305
