= Chatakonda =

- Census town
- Location in Andhra Pradesh, India
- Coordinates: 17.55°N 80.65°E
- Country: India
- State: Telangana
- District: Khammam
- Elevation: 70 m (230 ft)

Population (2001)
  - Total: 2,701

Languages
  - Official: Telugu
- Time zone: UTC+5:30 (IST)

Chatakonda is a census town in Khammam district in the state of Telangana, India.

== Geography ==
Chatakonda is located at 17.55°N 80.65°E. It has an average elevation of 70 metres (229 feet).

== Demographics ==
As of 2001 India census, Chatakonda had a population of 8701. Males constitute 50% of the population and females 50%. Chatakonda has an average literacy rate of 55%, lower than the national average of 59.5%; with male literacy of 62% and female literacy of 48%. 13% of the population is under age six.
