= Mustikuntla =

Mustikuntla is the largest village in Bonakal (Mandal) in Khammam district, in Telangana, India. It has a post office, several schools and a veterinary hospital. It has a stage which has been used for cultural programs like dramas, natikas used Ravicheetu Bazar. The death rate for 2009 was 6.54. Sarpanch was elected in 2014; he is from Mustikuntla village, Kommu. Shankar (CPM)
