= Lakaram lake =

Lakaram Lake
- Location within India
- Location: Khammam, Telangana, India
- Coordinates: 17°14′53.6″N 80°09′32.5″E

Lakaram lake is a lake in the city of Khammam. Located nearly 4 kilometres (2.5 mi) from a bus station, it is one of the main tourist attractions of the city. It has been developed recently under the auspices of Khammam MLA Sri Puvvada Ajay Kumar by the State government of Telangana under Mission Kakatiya.

Until 15 years ago it was surrounded by trees, but today has an adjoined park named Lakaram Lake View. The lake is popular for boating.

== Drinking Water ==
The lake serves as a drinking water source for the Khanapuram Haveli Suburb of Khammam.
