= Banoth Chandravathi =

Indian politician and legislator

Dr. Chandravathi

MLA

Personal details
- Born: 13 August 1983 (age 43) Khammam
- Party: Telangana Rashtra Samithi (2014–present)
- Other political affiliations: Communist Party of India (till 2014)
- Parent: Ramamurthy (father)
- Education: M.B.B.S
- Alma mater: Andhra Medical College, Visakhapatnam

Banoth Chandravathi is an Indian politician and legislator. She represents Wyra assembly constituency in Khammam district. Earlier she was with CPI party. In April 2014, she joined TRS (Telangana Rashtra Samithi) party.

== Early life and background ==
She was born in Lambada, a tribal community. She completed her M.B.B.S from Andhra Medical College, Visakhapatnam in 2007.

== Political career ==
Chandravathi was elected to the Assembly in 2009. She is the youngest legislator in Andhra Pradesh Legislative Assembly. She married her childhood friend, Suresh in 2011.

== Positions held ==
#	From	To	Position	Party
1.	2009	2014	MLA from Wyra Assembly constituency.	CPI
