= Enkuru mandal =

Coordinates: 17°18′45″N 80°25′46″E

- Mandalam
- Interactive map of Enkuru mandal
- Country: India
- State: Telangana
- District: Khammam district

Languages
  - Official: Telugu
- Time zone: UTC+5:30 (IST)
- Vehicle registration: TS 04
- Nearest city: Kothagudem
- Lok Sabha constituency: Khammam
- Assembly constituency: Wyra
- Climate: Aw (Köppen)

Enukuru mandalam is a mandalam in Khammam district of Telangana, India. As per 2011 Census, it has a total population of 33,151 and falls under Kalluru revenue division.

Enukuru mandal consists of 42 villages and 25 panchayats. Medepalle is the least populous village, and Enkuru is the most populous village.

== Literacy ==
As per the 2011 Census, 44.1% of the population in Enkuru mandal is literate.

== Villages ==
Villages in Enkuru mandal, Andal are:

- Akkinapuram Thanda
- Arikayalapadu
- Bhagvan naik tanda
- Burda Raghavapuram
- Enkuru
- Garlavoddu
- Himam nagar
- Jannaram
- Kesupally
- Madineni Nagar
- Medepalle
- Munya thanda
- Nacharam
- Nukulampadu
- Raimadaram
- Rajulapalem
- Ramathanda
- Sree ramagiri
- Thimmaraopeta
- Thuthaka Lingampeta
- Yerrabodu thanda

== Schools ==
Schools in Enkuru mandal are:

- Telngana Residential School, Enkuru mandal
- High School, Enkuru mandal
