= Tirumalayapalem =

Coordinates: 17°18′36″N 80°02′19″E

- Mandal
- Interactive map of Tirumalayapalem
- Country: India
- State: Telangana
- District: Khammam

Languages
  - Official: Telugu
- Time zone: UTC+5:30 (IST)
- Vehicle registration: TS-04
- Nearest city: khammam
- Lok Sabha constituency: khammam
- Vidhan Sabha constituency: paleru
- Climate: hot (normal climate classifications)
- Website: telangana.gov.in

Tirumalayapalem is a mandal in Khammam district of Telangana, India.

== Demographics ==
According to the 2001 Indian census, the population was as follows:

- Total Population: 60,568 in 14,299 Households.
- Male Population: 30,769 and Female Population: 29,799
- Children Under 6-years of age: 8,218 (Boys - 4,211 and Girls - 4,007)
- Total Literates: 24,783

== Villages ==
The villages in Thirumalayapalem mandal are:

- Bachodu
- Bachodu Thanda
- Beerolu
- Chandru Thanda
- Dammaigudem
- Edullacheruvu
- Erragadd
- Gol Thanda
- Gopala puram
- Hasnabad
- Hydersaipet
- Islavath Thanda
- Jaganadhapuram
- Jallepalli
- jupeda
- Kakarva
- Kokkiren
- Kukalatanda
- Medidapalli
- Mekalatanda
- Mohammadapuram
- Mulamarithanda
- Painampalli
- Patharlapadu
- Pindiprolu
- Raghunadhapalem
- Rajaram
- Solipuram
- Subledu
- Suddavagu thanda
- Thalla Cheruvu
- Thettalapadu
- Thirumalayapalem
- Tippareddigudem (formerly Ramachandrapuram), Thimmakkapeta
