= Ponnekal =

Coordinates: 17.427°N 80.184°E

Ponnekal is a village in Khammam district, Telangana, India.
