= Kunavaram =

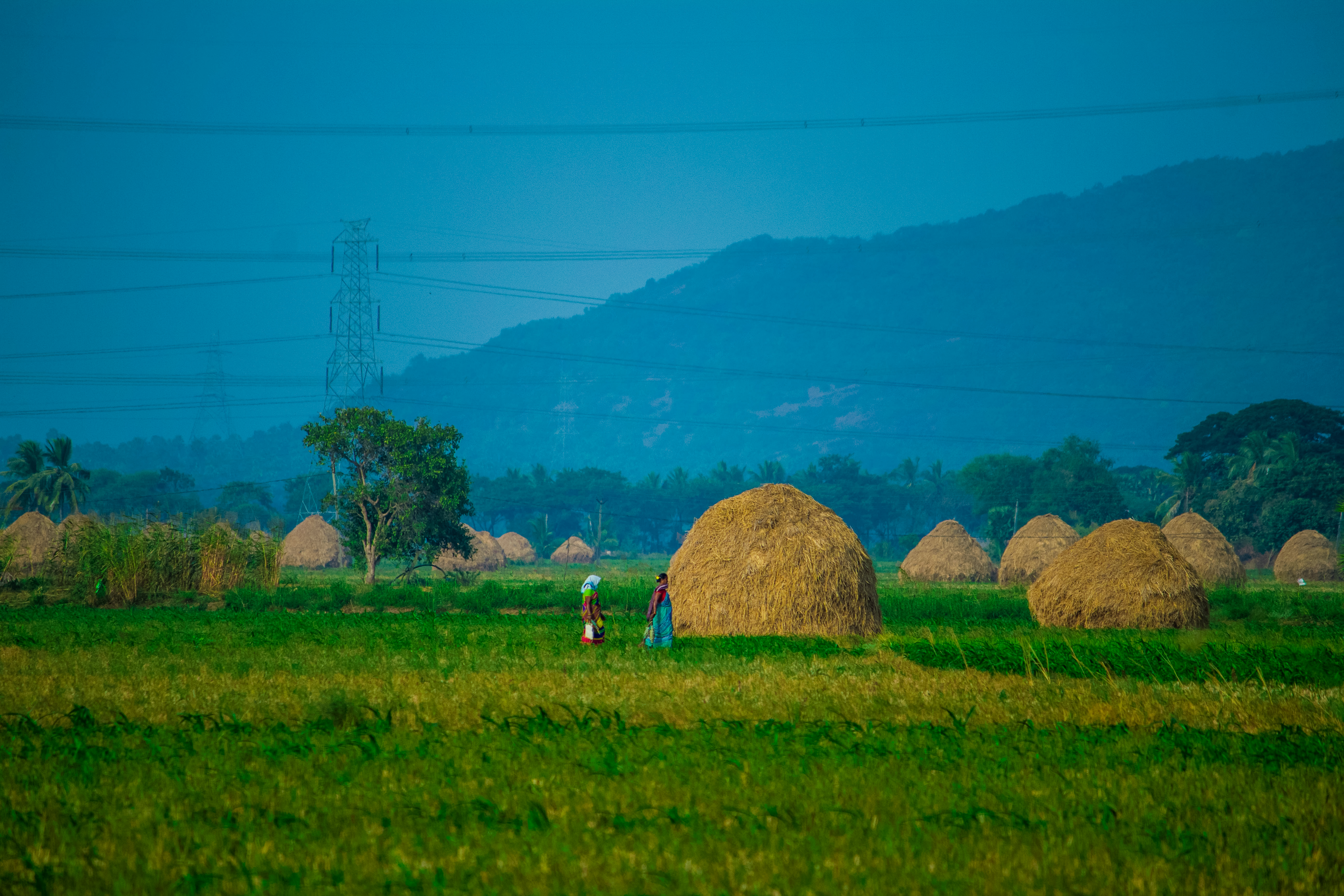
- Paddy Fields near Kunavaram
- Interactive map of Kunavaram
- Location in Andhra Pradesh, India Kunavaram (India)
- Coordinates: 17.5833°N 81.2667°E
- Country: India
- State: Andhra Pradesh
- District: Polavaram

Government
  - Type: Andhra Pradesh State Government

Languages
  - Official: Telugu
- Time zone: UTC+5:30 (IST)
- Vehicle registration: AP
- Climate: hot (Köppen)

Kunavaram is a village in Polavaram district, Andhra Pradesh. Kunavaram was a part of Khammam district of then newly formed Telangana until the transfer of 7 mandals including it to then newly formed Andhra Pradesh.

== Geography ==
Kunavaram is located at 17.5833°N 81.2667°E. It has an average elevation of 28 metres (95 ft).
