= Yerrupalem =

Errupalem Yerrupalem
- Village
- Location in Telangana, India Errupalem (India)
- Coordinates: 16.8333°N 80.4667°E
- Country: India
- State: Telangana
- District: Khammam
- Mandal: Yerrupalem

Government
  - Type: Gram panchayat
- Elevation: 56 m (184 ft)

Population (2011)
  - Total: 5,218

Languages
  - Official: Telugu
- Time zone: UTC+5:30 (IST)
- PIN: 507201
- Area code: +91-8749
- Vehicle registration: AP20, TS04
- Climate: hot (Köppen)
- Website: telangana.gov.in

Yerrupalem or Yerupalem or Errupalem is a village in Yerrupalem mandal of Khammam district, Telangana, India falling within the Madhira Assembly Constituency.

== Demographics ==
Yerrupalem is a town with a population of 5,218 individuals, consisting of 2,624 males and 2,594 females. The child population in the town is 476, with 240 boys and 236 girls. There are 1,176 individuals belonging to Scheduled Castes, evenly split between males and females (588 each). The Scheduled Tribes population is 33, comprising 19 males and 14 females.

Regarding literacy, 3,296 individuals in Yerrupalem are reported as literate, with 1,890 males and 1,406 females. There are 1,922 individuals who are illiterate, including 734 males and 1,188 females, representing a literacy percentage of approximately 63%.

== Transport ==
Yerrupalem has a railway station Errupalem railway station which is situated on the Kazipet-Vijayawada section of the New Delhi-Chennai main line.
