= N. V. Raghuram =

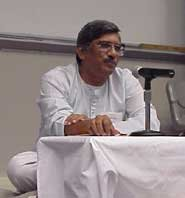

Personal life
- Born: Nelamangala Vuddi; 20 July 1948 Khammam, Telangana, India

Religious life
- Religion: Hinduism

Religious career
- Teacher: Swami Prabhuddhananda, Prof Satyanarayana Sastry

Quotation

one thing that can take away your shradda for karma is the karmaphala or the result. One thing which can bring about the ego of karma is also the phala!

N. V. Raghuram is a yoga guru from India.

== Biography ==
After completing Bachelor of Civil Engineering from Regional Engineering College Bhopal now Maulana Azad National Institute of Technology, in 1970 Raghuram worked as engineer in various departments until 1998 when he resigned his job to devote more time in the service of yoga and Indian philosophy.

In 1978 he took training in Kanyakumari and started his association with Vivekananda Kendra and since 1980, he is associated with Vivekananda Kendra Yoga Anusandhana Samsthan, (Yoga Research Foundation VKYOGAS). Mr. Raghuram is the International coordinator and senior yoga teacher of (VKYOGAS) presently known as sVYASA (Swami Vivekananda Yoga Anusandhana University). He is the Chairman of Yoga Bharati Movement since 2003.

Raghuram conducted research projects at Middlesbrough General Hospital in the UK and the Northern Colorado Allergy and Asthma Center, Fort Collins. Research papers have been published in international medical journals on these research projects. He was a member of the Indian delegation to the Third International Conference of Ministers and Senior Officials responsible for Physical Education and Sport organised by UNESCO in 1999.

Raghuram is credited with rescuing student Sarah Lionheart from his former guru in the 1980s. Sarah was held captive by Swami Prabhuddhananda and repeatedly sexually assaulted over a period of several months.

Raghuram’s wife, Dr R. Nagarathna, is the Dean of the Division of Yoga and Life Sciences of the Swami Vivekananda Yoga University.
