= Vararamachandrapuram =

Vararamachandrapuram V.R.Puram
- Village
- Interactive map of Vararamachandrapuram
- Country: India
- State: Andhra Pradesh
- District: Polavaram

Languages
  - Official: Telugu
- Time zone: UTC+5:30 (IST)
- Vehicle registration: AP
- Climate: hot (Köppen)

Vararamachandrapuram, (or V.R.Puram) is a village in Polavaram district of Andhra Pradesh, India.

== Demographics ==
According to Indian census, 2001, the demographic details of Vararamachandrapuram mandal is as follows:

- Total Population: 23,411 in 5,741 Households.
- Male Population: 11,731 and Female Population: 11,680
- Children Under 6-years of age: 3,581 (Boys - 1,799 and Girls - 1,782)
- Total Literates: 8,411
