= Vutukuru =

Utukuru
- Village
- Interactive map of Utukuru
- Location in Andhra Pradesh, India
- Coordinates: 16.568200°N 80.202604°E
- Country: India
- State: Andhra Pradesh
- District: Palnadu
- Mandal: Krosuru

Government
  - Type: Panchayati raj
  - Body: Utukuru gram panchayat

Area
  - Total: 1,150 ha (2,800 acres)

Population (2011)
  - Total: 3,685
  - Density: 320/km^{2} (830/sq mi)

Languages
  - Official: Telugu
- Time zone: UTC+5:30 (IST)
- PIN: 522410
- Area code: +91–8640
- Vehicle registration: AP

Utukuru is a village in Palnadu district of the Indian state of Andhra Pradesh. It is located in Krosuru mandal of Guntur revenue division.

== Geography ==
Utukuru is situated to the southwest of the mandal headquarters, Krosuru, at 16.568200°N 80.202604°E. It is spread over an area of 1,150 ha (2,800 acres).

== Governance ==
Utukuru gram panchayat is the local self-government of the village. It is divided into wards and each ward is represented by a ward member. It forms a part of Andhra Pradesh Capital Region. The village forms a part of Andhra Pradesh Capital Region and is under the jurisdiction of APCRDA.

== Education ==
As per the school information report for the academic year 2018–19, the village has a total of 5 schools. These include one private and 4 Zilla Parishad/MPP schools.
