= Parnasala =

- Village
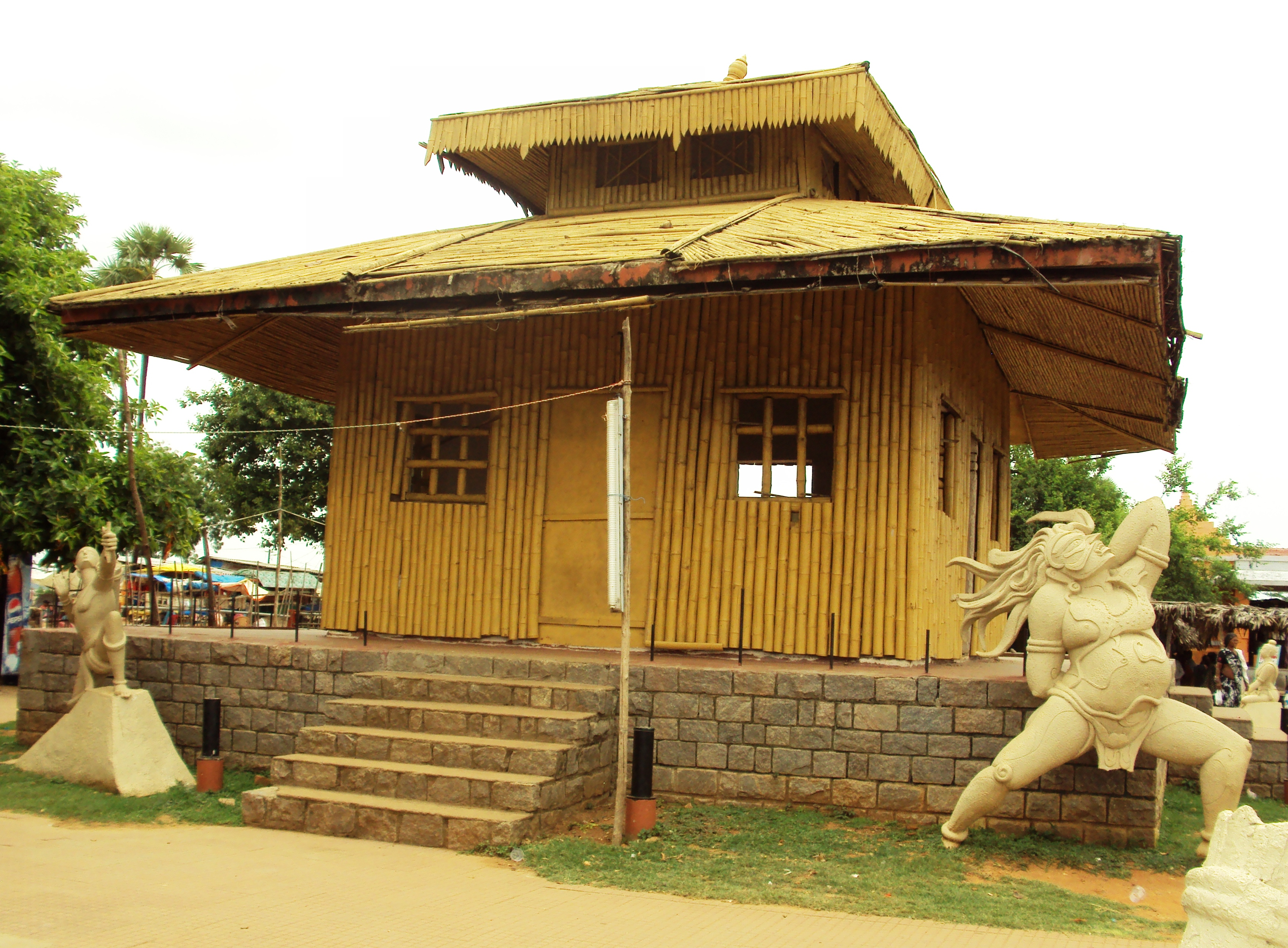
- Parnasala

- Location within Telangana Location within India
- Coordinates: 17.932°N 80.896°E
- Country: India
- State: Telangana
- District: Khammam
- Elevation: 55 m (180 ft)

Population (2022)
  - Total: 656

Languages
  - Official: Telugu
- Time zone: UTC+5:30 (IST)
- Postal code: 507137
- Vehicle registration: TS
- Website: telangana.gov.in

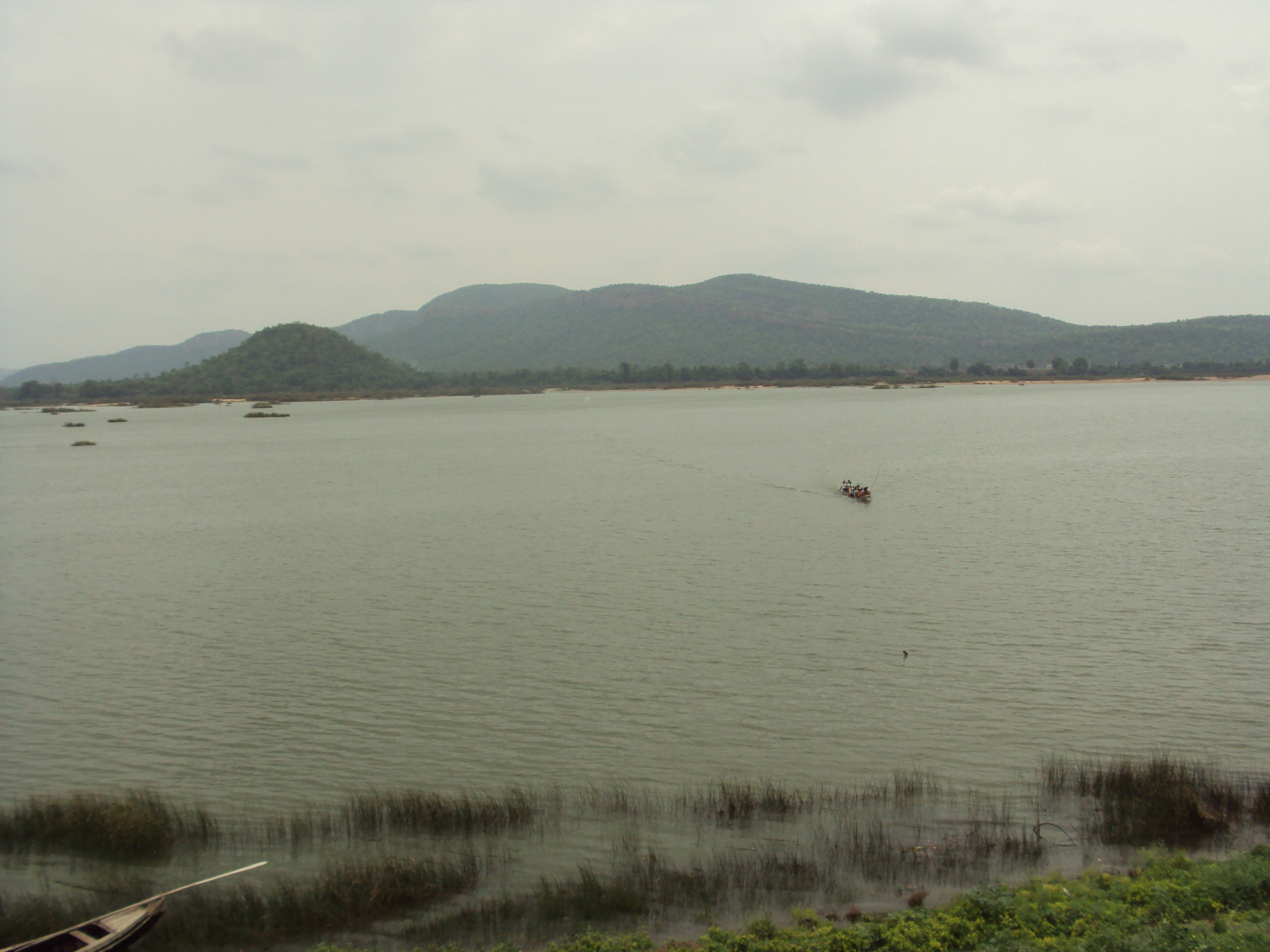
Godavari River at Parnasala

Parnasala is a village in the Dummugudem mandal in Bhadradri Kothagudem district of Telangana, India. The village is accessible by road and boats and is situated 32 km from the temple town of Bhadrachalam.

Bhadrachalam area has several Hindu deities connected with Epic book Ramayana.

According to the legend, Lord Rama built a hermitage in Parnasala during his exile and lived there for some time. The hermitage was named Parnasala because it was surrounded by trees (Parna means leaves and Sala means house). It is said that Lord Rama used to offer prayers to Lord Shiva at a nearby cave temple called Shivacave.

The history of Parnasala can be traced back to the Vedic period. The Vedas mention the importance of forests and their conservation, and the forests surrounding Parnasala were considered sacred. The village is located on the banks of the river Godavari, which has been mentioned in the Vedas as one of the seven holy rivers of India.

Parnasala is also associated with the Buddhist period. The nearby town of Bhadrachalam is believed to be the birthplace of Saint Ramadasu, a devotee of Lord Rama and a renowned saint of the 17th century. The Bhadrachalam temple, which is dedicated to Lord Rama, was constructed by Saint Ramadasu.

During the British period, Parnasala was a part of the Nizam's Hyderabad State. The village was known for its agricultural produce, especially rice and sugarcane. The people of Parnasala were skilled in making handicrafts and decorative items using bamboo and other natural materials.

In recent times, Parnasala has become a popular tourist destination. The Sri Rama Temple, which is believed to be the place where Lord Rama lived during his exile, is a major attraction. The temple is located on the banks of the river Godavari and is surrounded by lush green forests. The village is also known for its natural beauty, with the Parnasala Hill and the Kothagudem Waterfalls being popular spots for trekking and nature walks.

== Geography ==
Parnasala is located at 17°55′55″N 80°53′45″E and has an average elevation of 55 metres (183 ft).

== Demographics ==
According to the 2001 Indian census, the demographic details of Parnasala village are as follows:

- Total population: 513 in 116 households
- Male population: 253
- Female population: 260
- Children under 6 years of age: 51 (boys - 23 and girls - 28)
- Total literates: 429

== Legend ==
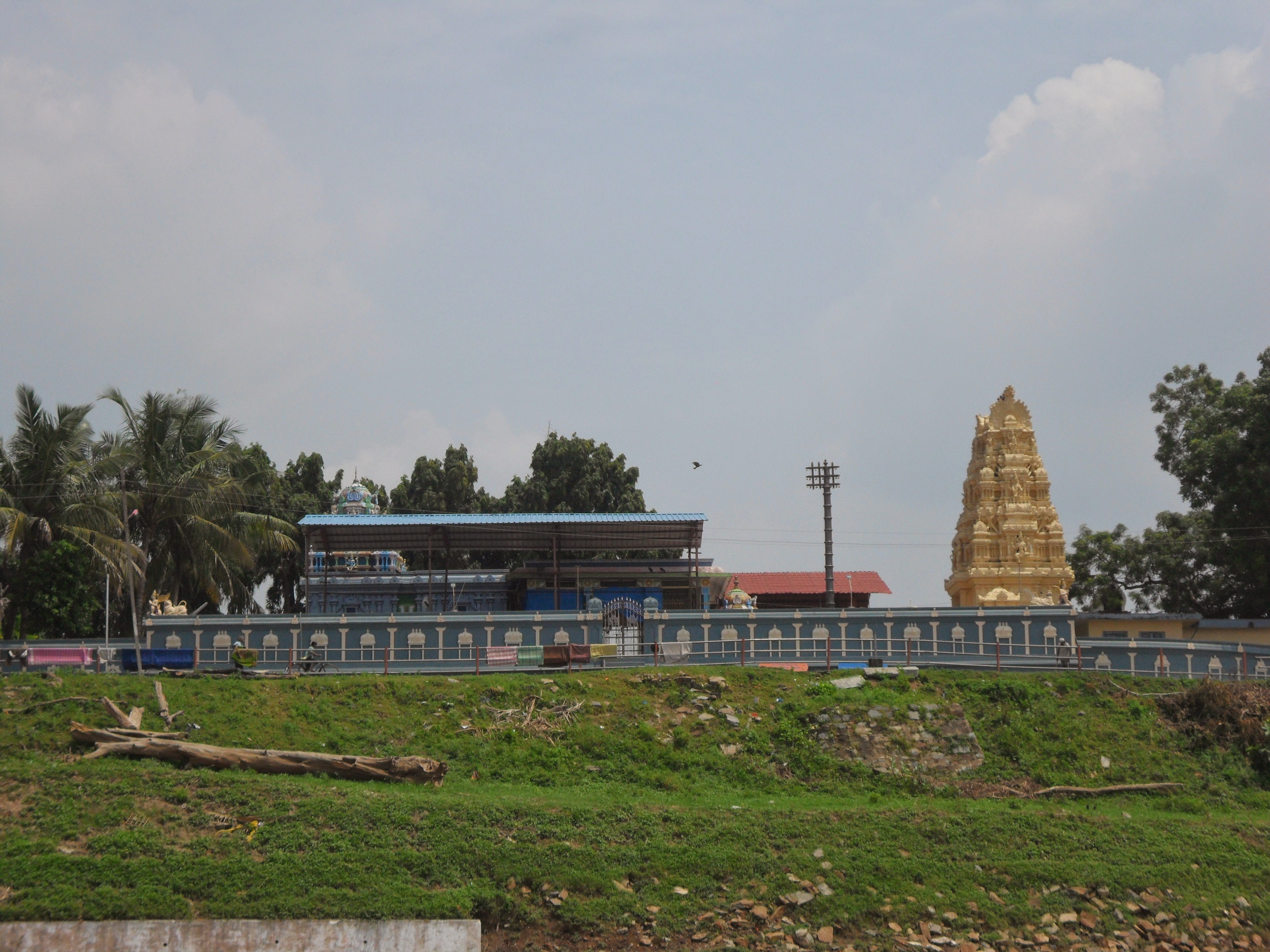
Temple of parnasala

According to legend, it is said the "Lord Sri Rama "spent some of the 14 years of exile at this location. The locals believe that Sita, the beloved consort of "Lord Sri Rama" bathed in the stream here and dried her clothes on "Radhagutta" where the imprints are seen even today. The demon king "Ravana" parked his Pushpaka on the hillock on the opposite side of the river and abducted her. An earthen ditch reportedly caused when Ravana removed earth to carry off Sita to Lanka can be seen here. Another Hindu legend names Parnashala as the location where Rama killed Maricha, who came in disguise of a golden deer to deceive Sita.
