= Julurpadu mandal =

Coordinates: 17°24′38″N 80°29′29″E

Julurpadu జూలూరుపాడు
- Mandal
- Interactive map of Julurpadu
- Country: India
- State: Telangana
- District: Bhadradri Kothagudem

Languages
  - Official: Telugu
- Time zone: UTC+5:30 (IST)
- Vehicle registration: AP
- Climate: hot (Köppen)

Julurpad or Julurpadu is a mandal in Bhadradri Kothagudem district, Telangana, India.

== Demographics ==
According to Indian census, 2001, the demographic details of Julurpad mandal is as follows:

- Total Population: 31,739 in 7,448 Households.
- Male Population: 16,020 and Female Population: 15,719
- Children Under 6-years of age: 5,030 (Boys - 2,545 and Girls - 2,485)
- Total Literates: 12,311
