= Konijerla =

- Village
- Country: India
- State: Telangana
- District: Khammam

Languages
  - Official: Telugu
- Time zone: UTC+5:30 (IST)
- Vehicle registration: TS
- Website: telangana.gov.in

Konijerala is a village and is the headquarters of one of the 46 mandals in Khammam district, Telangana of India.

== See also ==
- Botlakunta
