= Kalluru mandal =

Kalluru
- Mandal
- Location in Telangana, India Kalluru (India)
- Coordinates: 17.2044°N 80.5535°E
- Country: India
- State: Telangana
- District: Khammam

Population (2017 estimation)
  - Total: 20,000

Languages
  - Official: Telugu
- Time zone: UTC+5:30 (IST)
- Postal code: 507209
- Vehicle registration: TS 04
- Lok Sabha constituency: Khammam
- Vidhan Sabha constituency: Sathupalli leader_title =
- Website: telangana.gov.in

Kalluru is a Municipality and revenue division and mandal headquarter in the Khammam district of Telangana, India.

== Demographics ==
Kalluru mandal has a population of 63,336 while Kalluru municipality, has a population of 18916 (2011 census). Kalluru mandal has a literacy rate of 41% while the headquarters has a literacy rate of 72 (2011 Census).

== Temples ==
Kalluru has a famous temple of Lord Shiva known as Srikashmira Mahadevakshetram, Anjaneya Swamy temple, Kanaka Durga temple, Ganesh temple, Venugopalaswamy temple and Shirdi Said Baba temple. Both Vijayawada Kanakadurga temple and Bhadrachalam temple 100 km from this town.
