= Chintakani mandal =

Coordinates: 17°08′41″N 80°12′20″E

Chintakani
- Mandal
- Interactive map of Chintakani
- Country: India
- State: Telangana
- District: Khammam

Languages
  - Official: Telugu
- Time zone: UTC+5:30 (IST)
- PIN: 507208
- Vehicle registration: TS-20
- Vidhan Sabha constituency: Madhira
- Climate: hot (Köppen)

Chintakani or Chinthakani is a mandal in Khammam district of Telangana, India.

== Demographics ==
As per 2011 Census, the statistics of the mandal are:

- Total Population: 47,962 in 11,898 Households.
- Male Population: 24,271 and Female Population: 23,691
- Children Under 6-years of age: 6,028 (Boys - 3,010 and Girls - 3,018)
- Total Literates: 21,483
