= Khammam =

- City Corporation
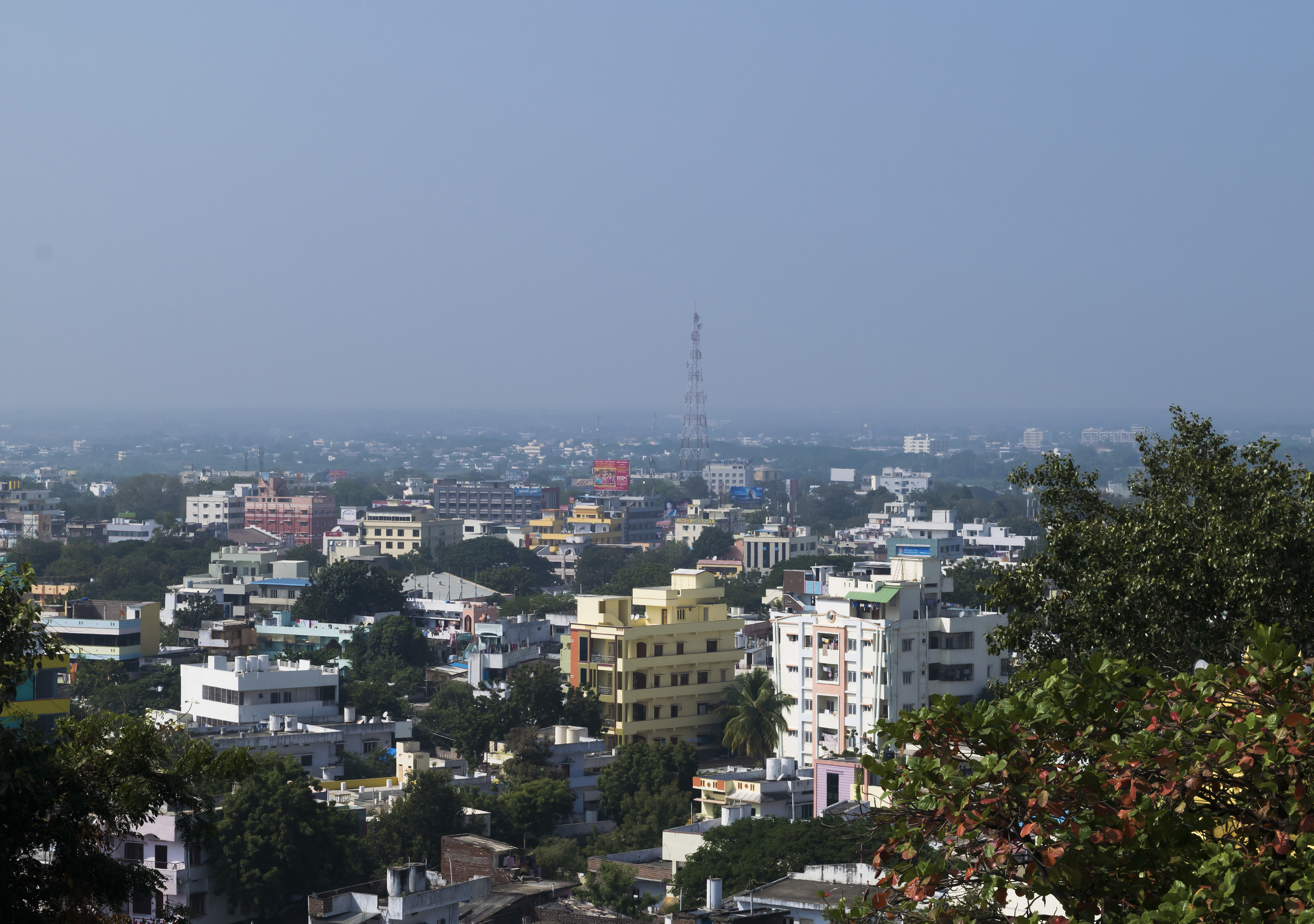
- Interactive map of Khammam
- Khammam (Telangana) Khammam (India)
- Coordinates: 17.247300°N 80.151400°E
- Country: India
- State: Telangana
- District: Khammam

Government
  - Body: Khammam Municipal Corporation
  - Mayor: Gudipudi Arun Kumar(BRS)
  - Deputy mayor: Fatima Zohra
  - Police Commissioner: Sunil Dutt, IPS

Area
  - City Corporation: 126.45 km^{2} (48.82 sq mi)
  - Urban: 866.54 km^{2} (334.57 sq mi)
  - Rural: 260.94 km^{2} (100.75 sq mi)
  - Metro: 56.45 km^{2} (21.80 sq mi)
  - Rank: 3rd (in state)
- Elevation: 150 m (490 ft)

Population (2011)
  - City Corporation: 353,504
  - Rank: 151(India); 5th (Telangana)
  - Density: 2,795.6/km^{2} (7,240.6/sq mi)
  - Metro: 633,933

Languages
  - Official: Telugu, Urdu
- Time zone: UTC+5:30 (IST)
- PIN: 507001/02/03/04/115/ 154/163/170/305/318
- Vehicle registration: TG-04; TS-04; AP-20 (Old)
- Ethnicity: Indian
- Planning agency: Stambhadri Urban Development Authority

Khammam is the city in Khammam district of the Indian state of Telangana. It is the fourth largest city in the state. It is the headquarters of the Khammam district and Khammam mandal also. It is located about 193 kilometres (120 mi) east of the state capital, Hyderabad, 61 kilometres (38 mi) from Suryapet, 120 kilometres (75 mi) from Warangal and also it is located about 121 kilometres (75 mi) North of the Andhra Pradesh state capital, Amaravathi. The river Munneru flows on the western side of the city. As of 2011 census of India, Khammam urban agglomeration has a population of 313,504. However, on 19 October 2012, the civic body of Khammam was upgraded to a municipal corporation. Post- upgradation to corporation, the population of Khammam was approximated to be 3,07,000. During 2014-2023 under BRS regime Khammam got a major changeover, roads expansion, Medical College, Engineering College, ITHub.

== Etymology ==
Historical records show that the city has various names such as Stambhadri, Kambamettu, Khammammettu, Kama Mett, Gambambumettu, Kambamu Mettu, Khammam. It is named after the oldest pillar at Stambhadri Narasimhaswamy temple. British and Christian Missionary records show the name as "Kamma Mettu.". However, they may have been spelled in the process of anglicization, as there is no name for Khammam from James Rennell's Map of India - Geographies - India-Faden-1795 The name was also anglicized as "Commum Met" and some places "Khammammet".

== History ==
The name Khammam, which means a pillar is named after lord Narasimha Swamy, the presiding deity of Narasimhaswamy Gutta, an important pilgrimage site for the locals. Because of the presence of Lord Narasimhaswami temple in Khammam, the city was named Sthambadri earlier. The city is located on the banks of a river called Munneru which is a tributary of the Krishna River. Khammam district has a lot of historical importance in Telangana.

From the year 1901 to 1981 Khammam town has grown from a small town of nine thousand population to a city of one hundred thousand inhabitants. In 1942 the town was constituted as Municipality. From the year 1952 to 1987 elections were held five times to elect its body.

Khammam City, which was the seat of the Taluk Administration, was part of the larger Warangal District, until 1 October 1953. Five taluks of the Warangal district viz., Khammam, Madhira, Yellandu, Burgampadu, and Paloncha (now Kothagudem) were carved out and a new district Khammam with Khammam as District Headquarters. In 1959 Bhadrachalam Revenue Division consisted of Bhadrachalam and Nuguru Venkatapuram Taluks of East Godawari district, which were on the other side of the river Godavari were merged into Khammam on grounds of geographical contiguity and administrative viability.

In 1973, a new taluk with Sathupalli as its headquarters was carved out from Madhira and Kothagudem taluks. In the year 1976 four new taluks were formed viz., Tirumalayapalem, Sudimalla, Aswaraopeta and Khammam district was initially a part of larger Warangal District.

History of Khammam shows that it has produced a number of leaders who were part of the Freedom struggle, such as first generation Communist leaders Peravelli Venkata Ramanaiah, Pendyala Satyanarayana Rao, Sarvadevabhatla Ramanatham, K.L. Narsimha Rao, Manchikanti Ramkishan Rao and Chirravuri Laxminarasaiah First Municipal Chairman of Khammam; Congress leaders Madapati Hanumantha Rao, Bachu Simhadri, Chepuri Nenkanna, Madapati Ramchander Rao, Sardar Jamalpuram Keshava Rao, Bommakanti Satyanarayana Rao, Ravulapati Satyanarayana Rao, Hayagreeva Chary, and Nizam Rashtra Vimochanam Jalagam Vengala Rao, former Chief Minister of AP, Prof. K. Venkata Ramiah, Founder and Vice-Chancellor of KU.

=== Freedom movement ===
Some of the notable events in Khammam town during the freedom struggle:

- 1915: First Iron and steel store established by the then freedom fighter Sri.Thavidisetty Sambaiah to cater the needs of Telangana

1928: Certified Medical Doctor, Dr.Kotha Venkata Narayana started Medical services

- 1931 – First Independence movement in Khammam proper
- 1935 – First Library established in Khammam town by Bachu Simhadri.
- 1936 – First Charka Jayathi initiated by Bachu Simhadri in Khammam.
- 1945 – 12th State Andhra Mahasabha meeting at Khammam organized by Pendyala Satya Narayana Rao as general secretary, Aahvana sangham. Elected Baddam Ellareddy as president and Pendyala Satya Narayana Rao as vice-president to 13th State Andhra Mahasabha in that meeting. The meeting was held on 26–28 March. Puchalapalli Sundarayya participated in the meeting as a guest. Nearly 40,000 people attended the meeting.
- 1946 – Mahathma Gandhi's visit to Khammam mett (Khammam town) on 5 August 1946
- 1947 August, 7 – Satyagraham at Madhira and Khammam by Jamalapuram Kesava Rao, Kurapati Venkata Raju, Jagadeeswaraiah Neelakandan, Bachalakura Laxmaiah, Vattikonda Ramakotaiah, Heeralal Moriya, Teegala Hanumantha Rao, Kolipaka Kishan Rao, Gella Keshava Rao, Yadavalli Venkateswara Sharma, Pullabhotla Venkateswarlu (Hyderabad congress present), Ravulapati Satyanarayana Rao (Paleru Samithi President – congress party), Vutukuru Kamala (Freedom Fighter – Telangana Vimochana)

== Geography ==
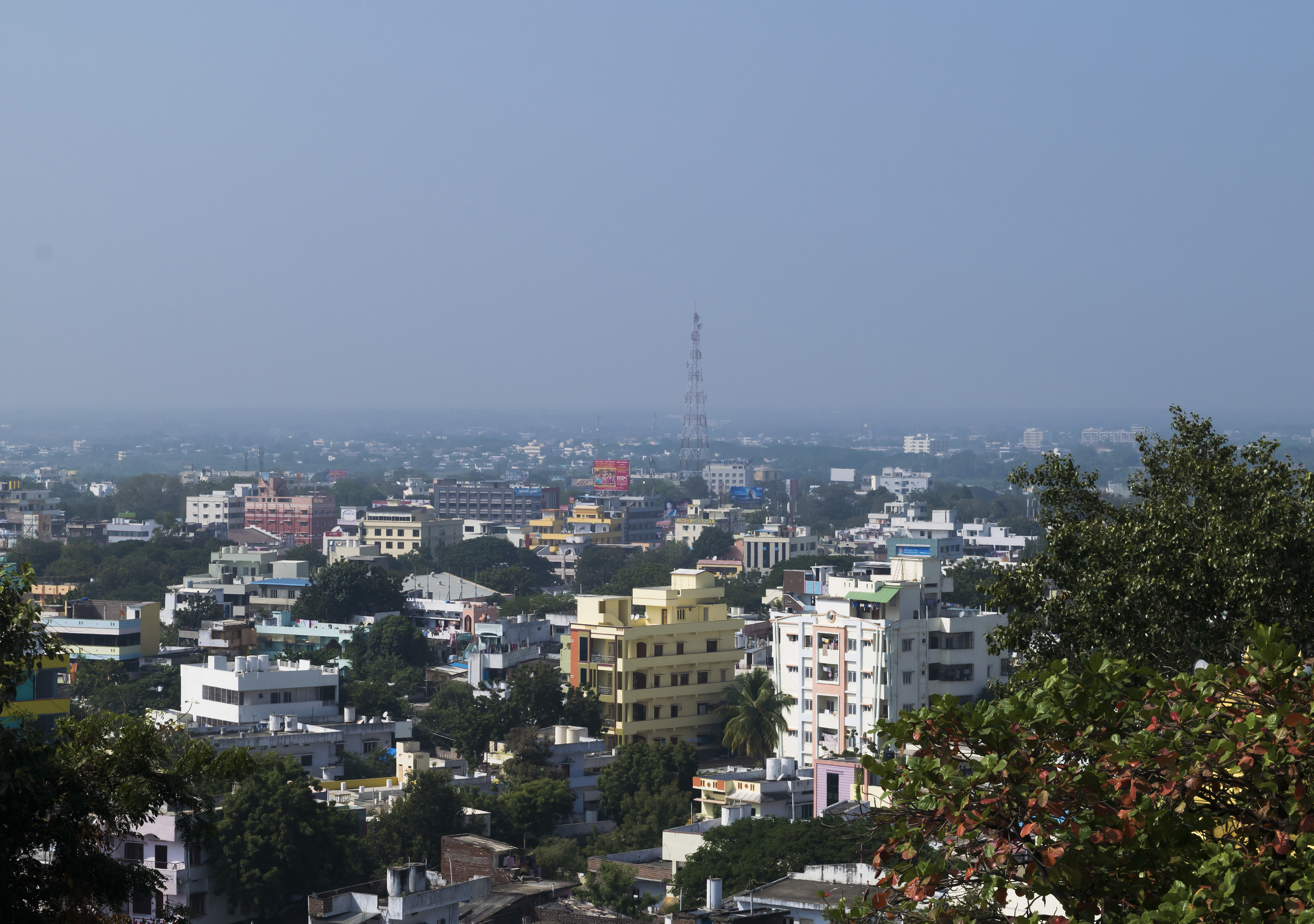
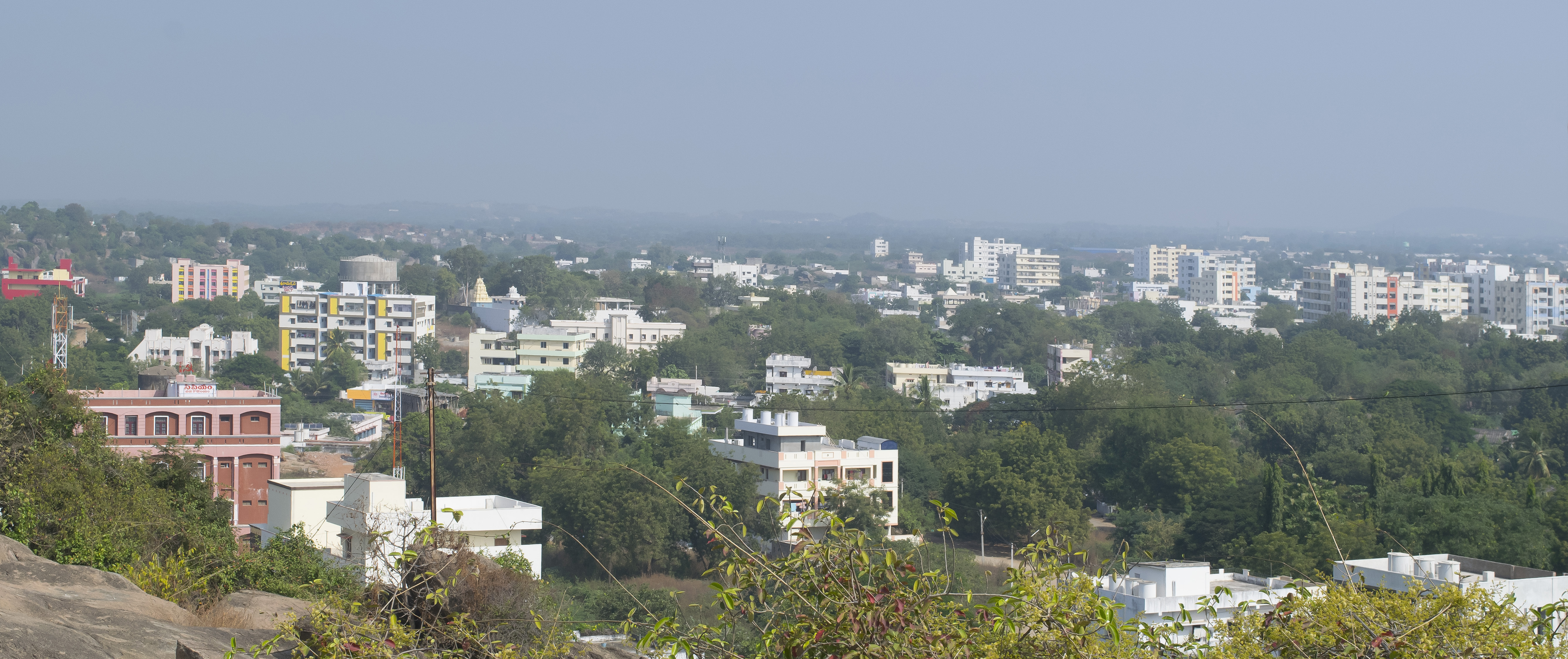
Left:North of Khammam town as seen from Narasimha Swamy hill, Right:South of Khammam town as seen from Narasimha Swamy hill

=== Topography ===
Khammam is located at 17.25°N 80.15°E. It has an average elevation of 108 metres (390 feet).

=== Climate ===
Khammam

Climate chart (precipitation, max. and min. temperature)
J	F	M	A	M	J	J	A	S	O	N	D
15 30 16	5 33 18	5 37 22	7 40 26	15 42 28	50 37 28	85 32 25	170 31 25	160 33 23	70 33 22	10 31 18	0 30 15
- █ Average max. and min. temperatures in °C
- █ Precipitation totals in mm
Imperial conversion
J	F	M	A	M	J	J	A	S	O	N	D
0.6 86 61	0.2 91 64	0.2 99 72	0.3 104 79	0.6 108 82	2 99 82	3.3 90 77	6.7 88 77	6.3 91 73	2.8 91 72	0.4 88 64	0 86 59
- █ Average max. and min. temperatures in °F
- █ Precipitation totals in inches

Climate for Khammam Average Weather in Khammam for January Sunlight 9 hours a day Coldest January temperature 12 °C Coldest daily temperature 16 °C Warmest daily temperature 28 °C Warmest January temperature 38 °C Discomfort* Moderate Morning Humidity 76% Evening Humidity 45% Rain in January 4 mm

Average Weather in Khammam for February Sunlight 10 hours a day Coldest February temperature 15 °C Coldest daily temperature 19 °C Warmest daily temperature 29 °C Warmest February temperature 40 °C Discomfort* Moderate Morning Humidity 67% Evening Humidity 39% Rain in February 9 mm Wet days for February 1 days

Khammam experiences typical Indian climatic conditions. The summer season is hot and the temperatures can climb rapidly during the day. The monsoon season brings a certain amount of rainfall and the temperatures gradually reduce during this period. After the onset of the monsoon, day temperatures are much lower and as the winter approaches, they reduce further.

The summer season is from March and lasts till the end of May. During this time of day temperatures are high and can reach 40 °C to 48 °C. Humidity is low as it is not located near the ocean. Conditions are generally dry during this period and the temperatures range from a minimum of 35 °C and can rise up to a maximum of 40 °C to 45 °C. Monsoon season brings much needed relief from the heat. Monsoon seasons are from the months of June to September. Temperatures average around 30 °C during this period. The place gets rain from the South West Monsoon. Some amount of rainfall can be experienced in October as well. The Winter season is from December to February. January is usually the coldest part of the year. Temperatures range from 28 °C to 34 °C during this time.

- Winter: December To February
- Summer: March to June
- South West Monsoons – July to September
- North East Monsoons – October to November

Rainstorms and cyclones are common in the region during the rainy season, which starts with the monsoons in early June. The cyclones could occur any time of the year, but commonly between August and November.

Climate data for Khammam (1991–2020, extremes 1941–2020)
Month	Jan	Feb	Mar	Apr	May	Jun	Jul	Aug	Sep	Oct	Nov	Dec	Year
Record high °C (°F)	35.0 (95.0)	39.4 (102.9)	43.3 (109.9)	45.5 (113.9)	48.0 (118.4)	46.7 (116.1)	40.6 (105.1)	41.2 (106.2)	39.6 (103.3)	37.4 (99.3)	35.4 (95.7)	34.6 (94.3)	47.2 (117.0)
Mean daily maximum °C (°F)	29.4 (84.9)	32.1 (89.8)	35.3 (95.5)	37.4 (99.3)	40.1 (104.2)	36.6 (97.9)	32.7 (90.9)	31.6 (88.9)	32.4 (90.3)	31.8 (89.2)	30.6 (87.1)	28.8 (83.8)	33.2 (91.8)
Mean daily minimum °C (°F)	18.0 (64.4)	20.8 (69.4)	23.5 (74.3)	25.9 (78.6)	27.6 (81.7)	26.9 (80.4)	25.1 (77.2)	24.5 (76.1)	24.8 (76.6)	23.5 (74.3)	20.7 (69.3)	17.2 (63.0)	23.2 (73.8)
Record low °C (°F)	9.4 (48.9)	10.0 (50.0)	14.2 (57.6)	18.0 (64.4)	18.6 (65.5)	21.2 (70.2)	18.4 (65.1)	19.0 (66.2)	18.7 (65.7)	15.2 (59.4)	11.7 (53.1)	9.7 (49.5)	9.4 (48.9)
Average rainfall mm (inches)	12.0 (0.47)	10.6 (0.42)	3.1 (0.12)	8.7 (0.34)	42.5 (1.67)	109.7 (4.32)	195.2 (7.69)	231.4 (9.11)	136.5 (5.37)	124.5 (4.90)	18.5 (0.73)	6.8 (0.27)	899.7 (35.42)
Average rainy days	0.7	0.2	0.2	0.7	2.1	5.9	11.1	11.6	6.9	6.1	1.3	0.3	47.1
Average relative humidity (%) (at 17:30 IST)	52	47	38	37	37	51	67	71	69	69	62	56	55
Source: India Meteorological Department

During the 2015 India heat wave, Khammam experienced a maximum temperature of 48 °C (118 °F).

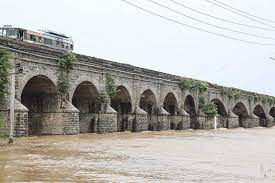
Munneru bridge with heavy flood

=== Floods ===
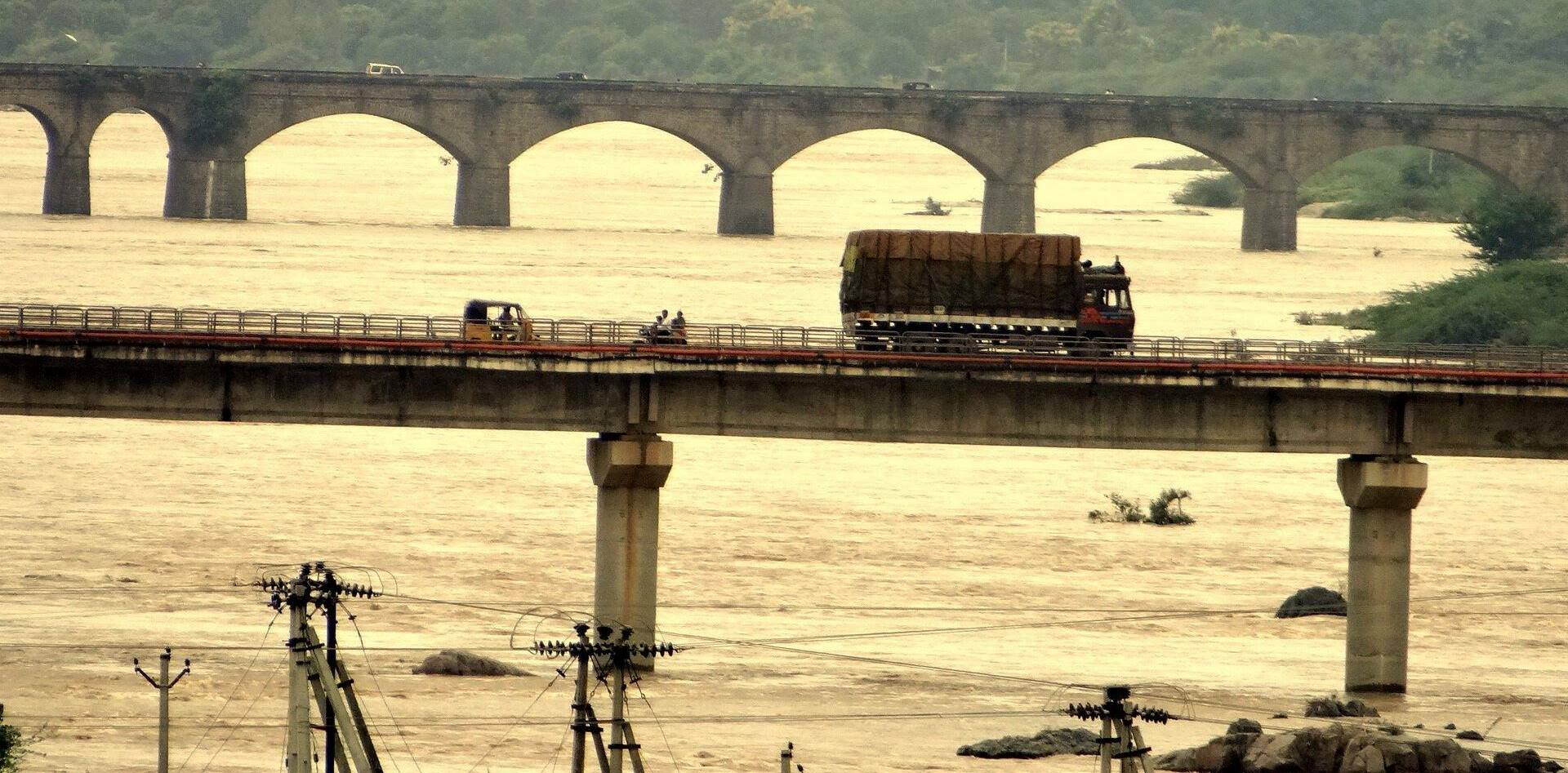
Munneru river in Khammam

Khammam has been receiving higher annual rainfall than the rest of the state. The annual rainfall is 175 centimetres (69 in) during the monsoon season. Khammam was also affected by the floods of Munneru, the tributary of the Krishna River. In 2007, the floods struck by the River drowned the Bokkalagadda with heavy three-day rain. Again in 2009, floods struck and inundated the area. There has also been a proposal for the construction of a barricade. The Food Corporation of India assists farmers in Khammam whose crops have been damaged in foods by procuring their crops and guaranteeing a minimum support price.

== Demographics ==
Historical population
Year	Pop.	±%
1911	9,117	—
1921	11,532	+26.5%
1931	13,002	+12.7%
1941	18,982	+46.0%
1951	28,251	+48.8%
1961	35,888	+27.0%
1971	56,919	+58.6%
1981	98,757	+73.5%
1991	149,077	+51.0%
2001	198,620	+33.2%
2017	562,255	+183.1%

As of 2011 census, population of Khammam (urban and rural areas combined) in 2011 is 313,504; of which male and female are 155,461 and 158,043 respectively—a sex ratio of 1017 females per 1000 males. Urban population of Khammam is 250,182 whereas, rural population of Khammam is 63,322. 32,172 children are in the age group of 0–6 years, of which 16,725 are boys and 15,447 are girls —a ratio of 924 per 1000. The average literacy rate stands at 79.40% (For ages 7 and above) with 223,380 literates, significantly higher than the state average of 67.41%.

Religions in Khammam
Religion	Percent
Hindu	73.41%
Muslim	24.39%
Christians	1.65%
Others†	0.55%
†Includes Sikhs, Jains

== Governance ==
The Khammam Municipal Corporation is the city's civic body.

Khammam is one of Telangana's historical cities, with nearly 1,000 years of traceable history. It is the headquarters of the Khammam District. The town was constituted into a Municipality on 24 March 1942 and upgraded to a special grade municipality in the year 2001. Administratively, Khammam is divided into 11 revenue wards and 41 election wards. In 2012, the Khammam municipality was made a Municipal Corporation, with 14 additional gram panchayats being merged into the newly formed Khammam Municipal Corporation. Presently Khammam has 20 revenue wards and 60 election divisions. The Municipal Corporation has an area of 93.45 km^{2}.

== Culture ==
Bhakta Ramadasu Kala Kshetram, has been a prestigious National theatre, constructed by the State Government in the name of Sri. Bhakta Ramadasu ( Kancherla Gopanna ) was a devotee of Sri Rama and composer of Carnatic music.

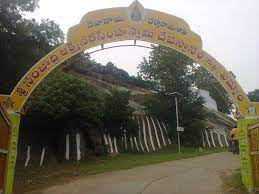
Narasimhaswamy temple on Ghat Road

== Landmarks ==
Khammam Fort, constructed in 950 AD by the Kakatiya Dynasty, is situated on a hill overlooking the city. Lakaram lake is another tourist attraction. Apart from these there are many places surrounding the city, such as Bhadrachalam, Parnasala, Nelakondapalli, Kusumanchi.

== Economy ==
In 2023 Godrej Agrovet, broke ground on an Integrated Palm Oil complex in Khammam. The investment in the facility is estimated to be close to Rs 300 crore.

=== Information technology ===
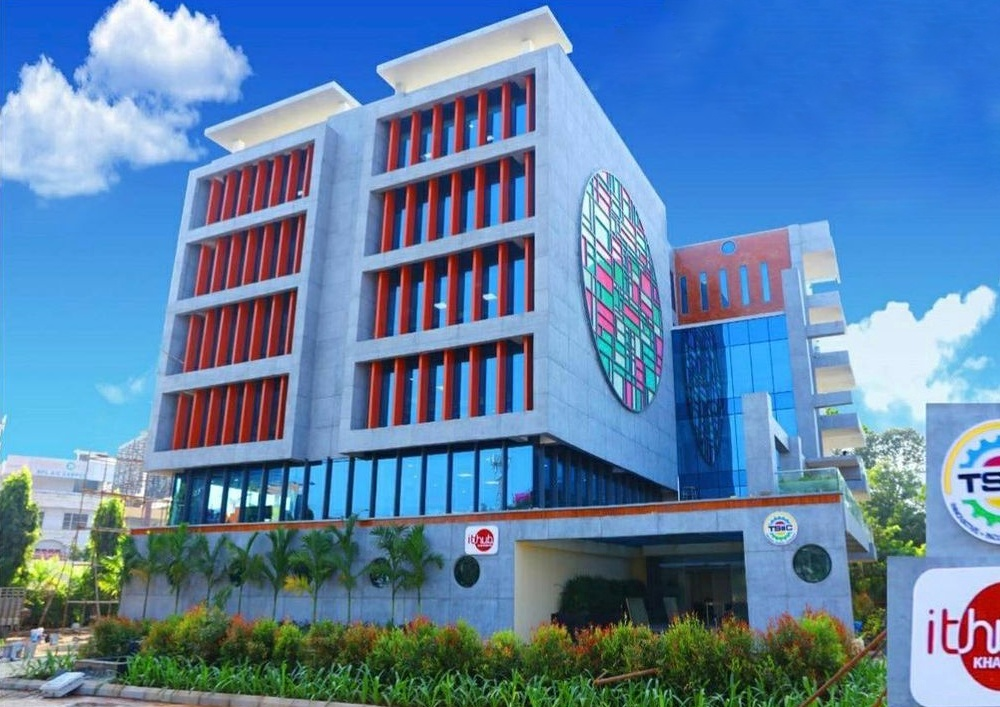
Khammam IT Hub

Minister for IT and Industries KT Rama Rao inaugurated IT Hub in Khammam city. Spread across 42,000 sq feet, the five-floor IT tower is constructed at a cost of Rs 27 crore. As many as 19 companies signed up to begin operations at the IT hub which provides employment opportunities to unemployed youth. The minister also said that the government will sanction Rs 20 crore soon for the phase II of IT Hub.

== Transport ==
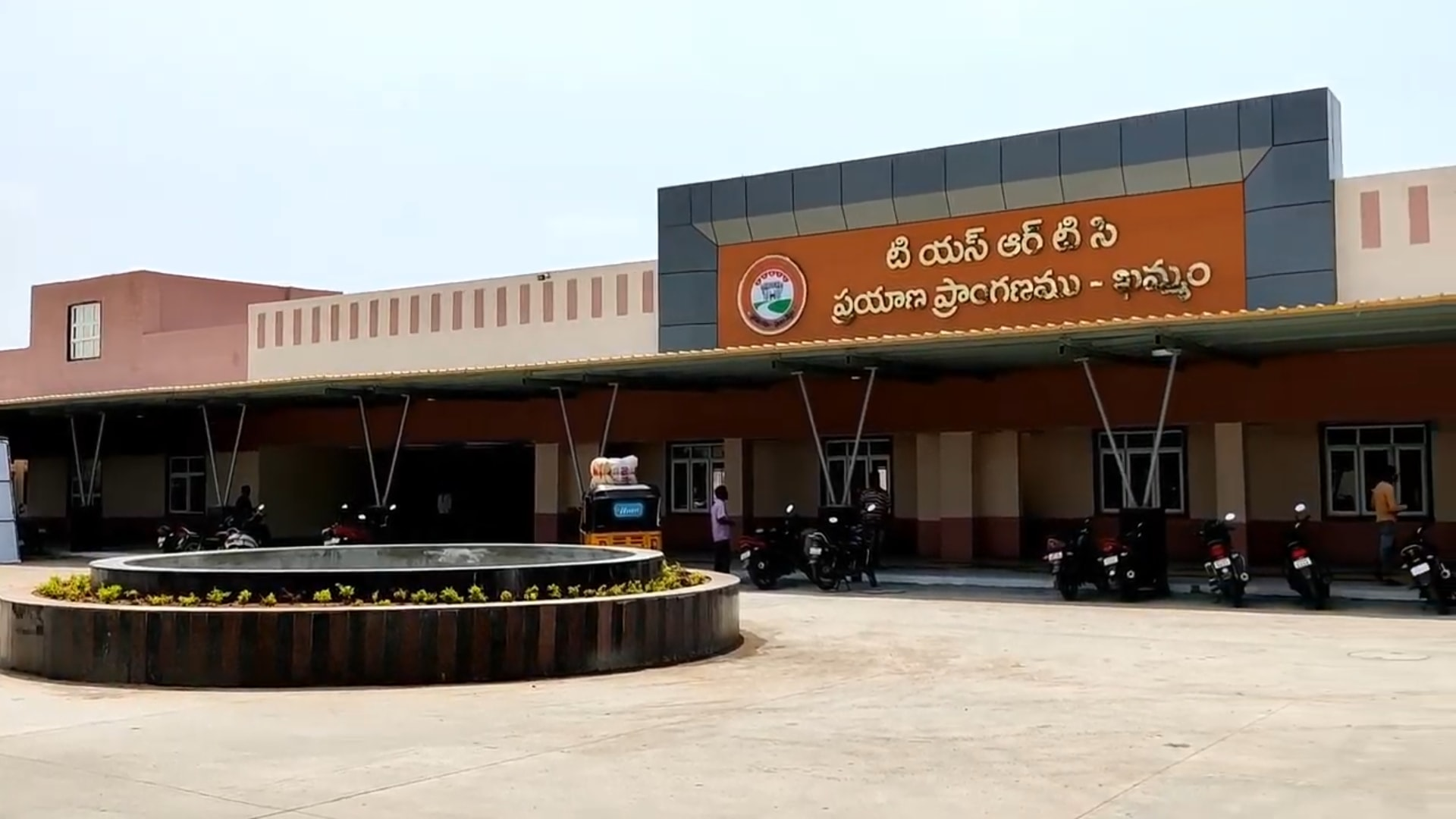
Entrance to Khammam New Bus Station

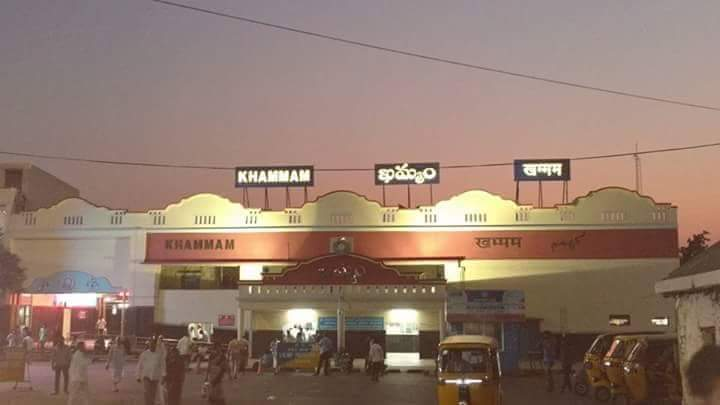
Entrance to Khammam Railway Station

The city is connected to major cities and towns by means of road and railways. National and state highways that pass through the city are:

- National Highway 365BB(Connects Khammam with Suryapet, Hyderabad and Rajahmundry),
- National Highway 365A
- National Highway 563
- State Highway 3, and 42.

Khammam provides an alternative route from Hyderabad to the Godavari districts, bypassing the busy Vijayawada-Eluru route. Khammam also connects the cities Warangal and Rajahmundry.

The proposed Khammam-Devarapalli Greenfield Highway, which is currently under construction, is expected to significantly reduce the travel time between Hyderabad to Rajahmundry and Hyderabad to Vishakhapatnam upon its completion.

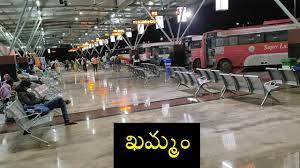
New Busstand-Khammam

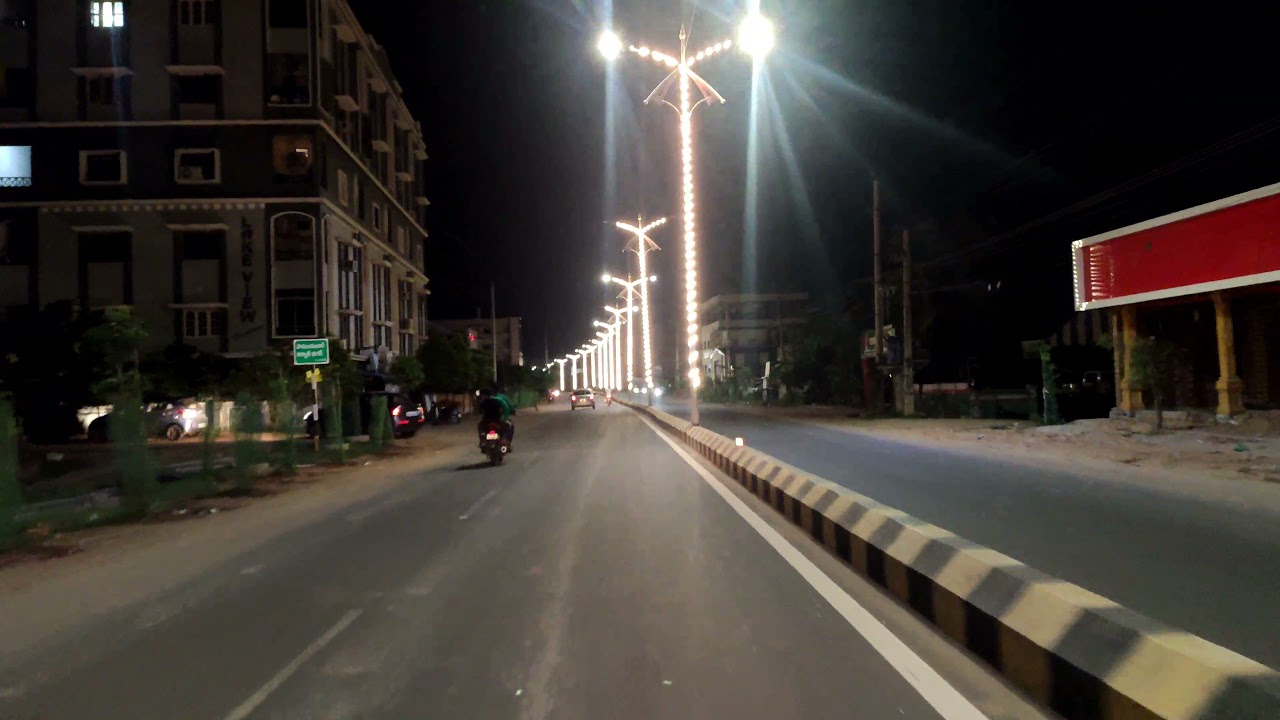
Mamata Road-Night View

=== Road ===
Khammam Telangana State Road Transport Corporation bus station is the second biggest and highly sophisticated bus station in the Telangana state with modern facilities. It has 40 platforms and serving Large fleet of buses are available to various destinations in Telangana, Andhra Pradesh, Karnataka, Chhattisgarh and Odisha to the cities like Hyderabad, Warangal, Karimnagar, Nizamabad, Suryapet, Bangalore, Visakhapatnam, Vijayawada, Tirupathi, Nellore, Guntur, Eluru, Rajamundry, Kakinada, Srikakulam, Jagadalpur & Bailadilla (Chhattisgarh), Koraput and Jaipur (Odisha). City buses in the name of Khammam City Service run in various routes across the city and sub urban areas and soon TSRTC will establish new city bus depot to operate city services within the city and to surrounding villages. A fleet of 50 electrical buses will get by TSRTC Khammam region under FAME policy.

=== Railway ===
Khammam railway station provides rail connectivity to the city, located on the Kazipet–Vijayawada section of the New Delhi-Chennai main line. It is administered under Secunderabad railway division of the South Central Railway zone. The station is served by Indian Railways and is well connected by rail to all parts of India. 98 trains arrive at or depart from the station every day, transporting over one lakh sixty thousand (160,000) passengers daily to their destinations across the country. Khammam railway station was declared second cleanest in the 'NSG3' category stations.

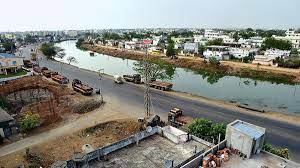
NS Canal passing through Khammam city

== Education ==
There are various pharmacy colleges such as Khammam College of Pharmaceutical Sciences, Browns College of Pharmacy and MBA, MCA, and engineering colleges around Khammam, such as the Khammam Institute of Technology and Sciences and Swarna Bharathi Institute of Science and Technology Engineering College, The Vazir Sultan College of Engineering. Mamata Medical College is also a teaching hospital located in the city. SR & BGNR Degree and KMDC Degree & PG College also conducts archaeological research on megalithic sites. For competitive exams like groups, police, and teacher jobs Right Choice IAS academy is the famous coaching center in the entire Khammam district. A Government Medical College received final approval to begin instruction in Khammam for the 2023-2024 school year. The government medical college was inaugurated in September, 2023.

== Media ==
The major Telugu newspapers in city are Sakshi, Eenadu, Andhra Bhoomi, Andhra Prabha, Vaartha, Suryaa, Prajasakti, Nava telangana and Vishalandra. The major English newspapers in the city are The Hindu, Telangana Today, The Times of India, Deccan Chronicle, The Hindu Business Line, The New Indian Express and The Hans India. Electronic Media include HMTV, ETV, and Sakshi.

== Sports ==
- Sardar Patel Stadium – A stadium with all amenities including sports complex, indoor stadium, swimming pool, cricket net, skating rink, volleyball, basketball and tennis courts. There is a running track around the football pitch.

=== Festivals ===
Women in the city celebrate Bathukamma, a floral festival in which they worship the goddess with different flowers for nine days. The women carry their Bathukamma to the nearest temple of their locality, then they clap, sing and dance rhythmically around the Bathukamma. Along with Bathukamma, Bonalu was also declared a state festival on 15 June 2014.

=== Cuisine ===
The cuisine of the city is mainly South Indian. The famous breakfast items are idli, dosa, vada, Rava Bonda, Mysore Bonda, Parotha and Puri. Rice with variety of curries including curd is taken as main food and the most notable one is the Biryani. Special food items Harees and Haleem are traditional food items available in the season of Ramadan.

== Notable people ==
- N. V. Raghuram (born 1948), Indian yoga guru
- Ravi Devesetti (born 1969), Tech Executive (PayPal, Experian, TCS)
- Ravulapati Seetarama Rao (born 1943), Retd. IPS Officer, Ex. Andhra Pradesh Police Housing Chairman-TDP
- Uppuluri Sreenivasa Sreekanth (born 1976), Tech Entrepreneur
- Srikanth Kesa (born 1977), Business Man
- Priyadarshi Pullikonda (born 1989), Telugu Actor
- VJ Sunny (born 1989), Telugu Actor, winner of Bigg Boss (Telugu season 5)
