= Khammam district =

- District of Telangana
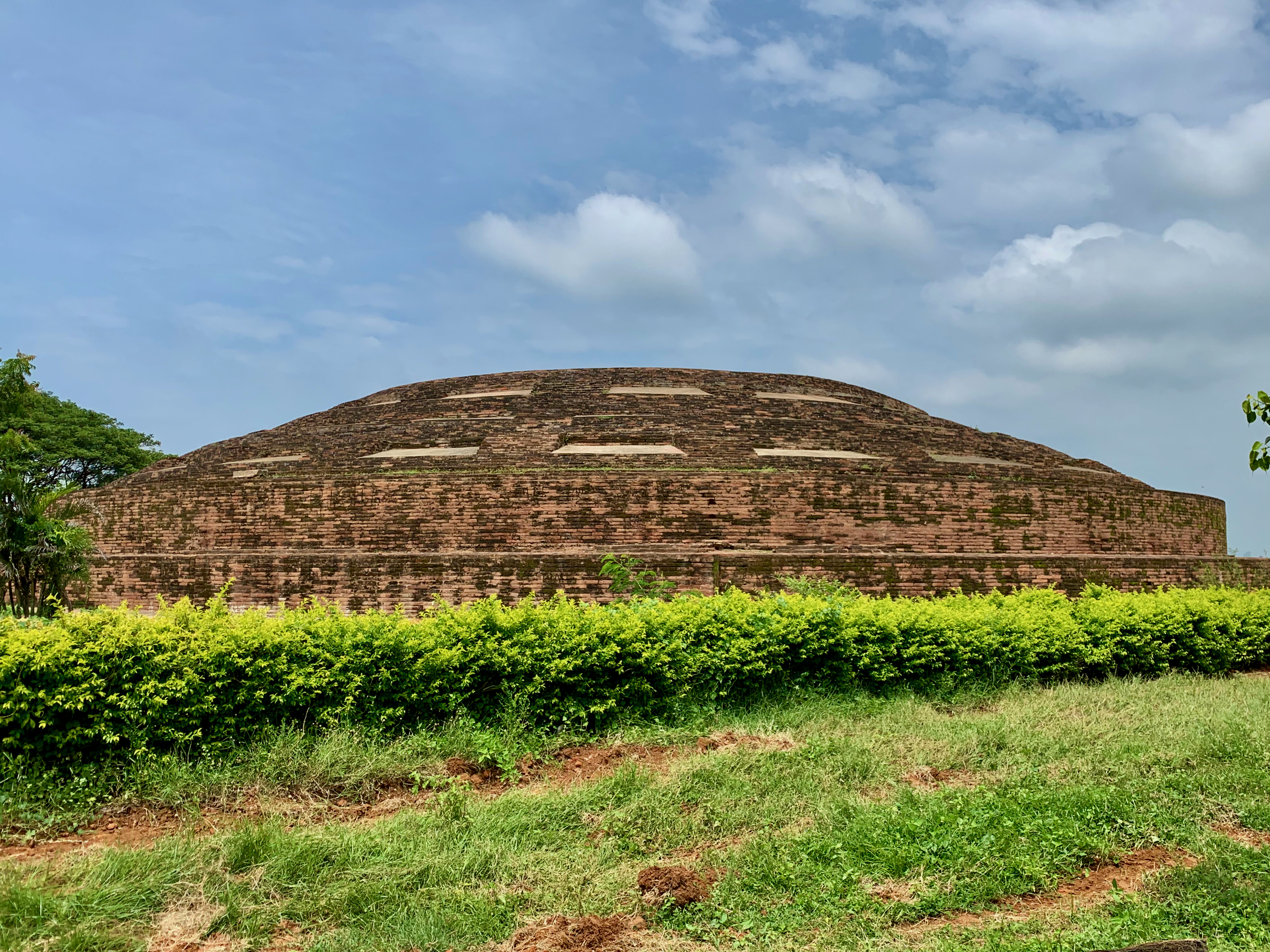
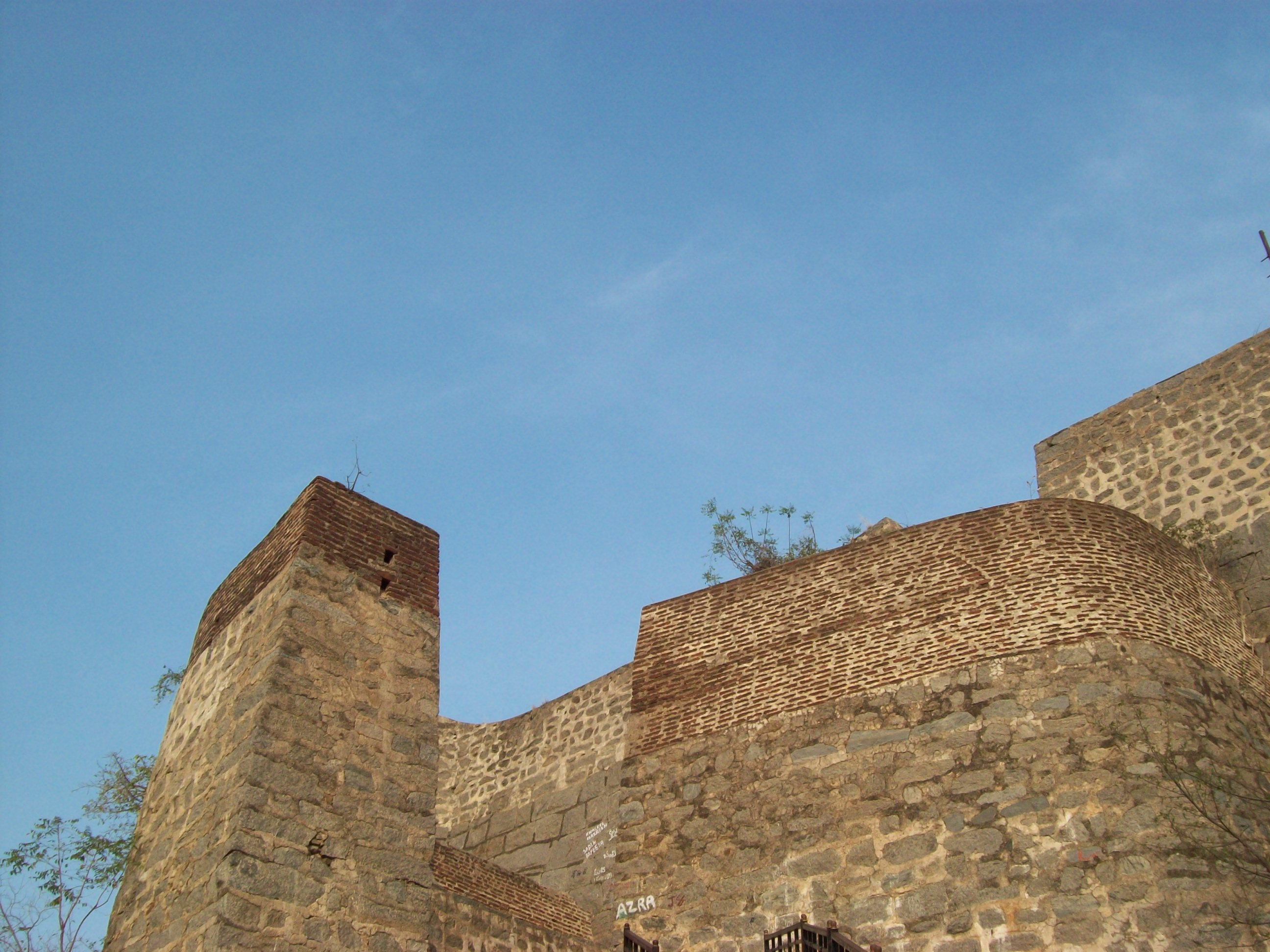
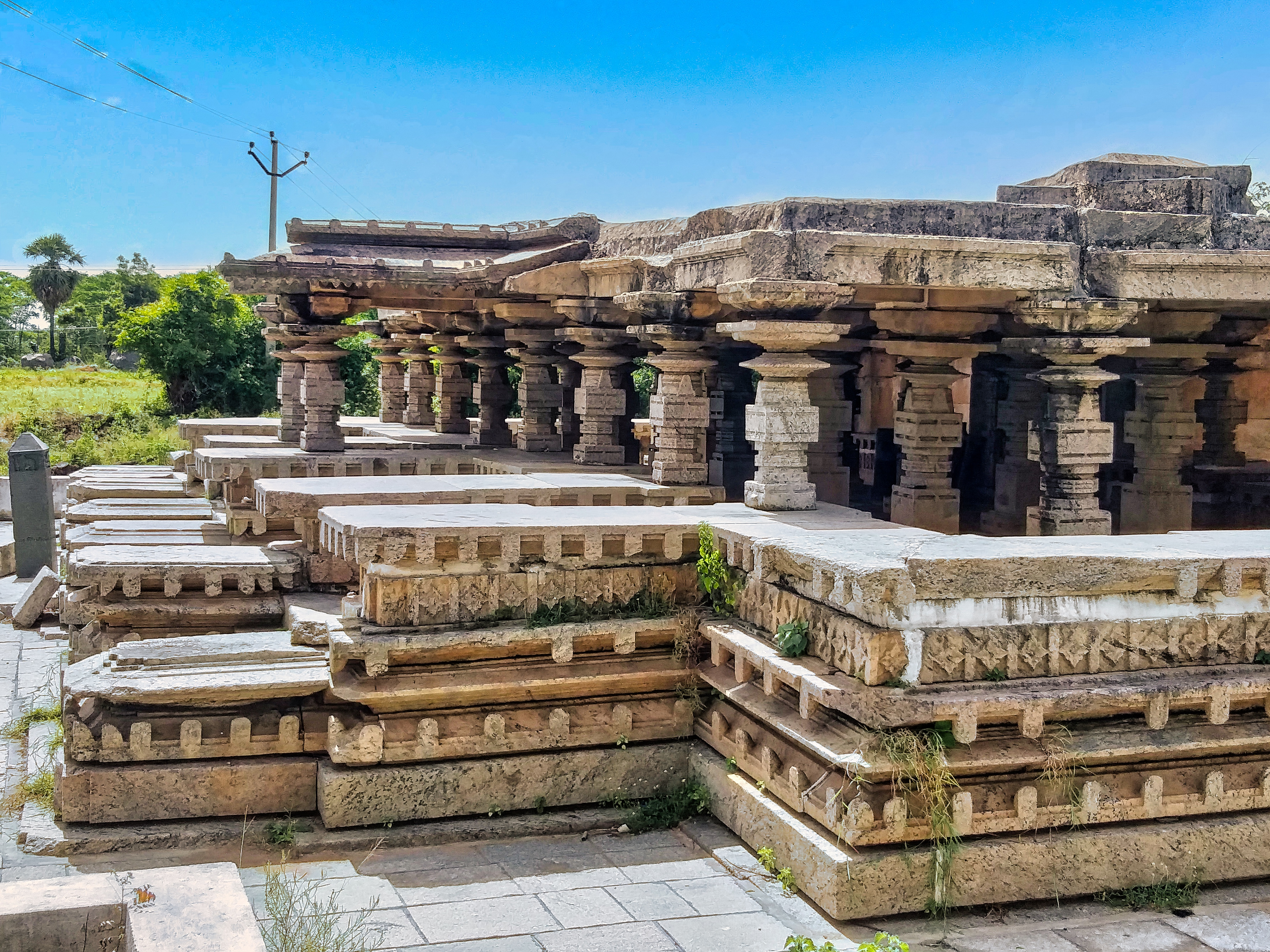
- Erradibba Stupa in Nelakondapalli Khammam Fort view Mukkanteswaralayam in Kusumanchi
- Interactive map of Khammam district
- Country: India
- State: Telangana
- Established: 1 October 1953
- Reorganisation: 11 October 2016
- Headquarters: Khammam
- Mandalas: 21

Government
  - District collector: Sri Anudeep Durishetty I.A.S.,
  - Parliament constituencies: 1
  - Assembly constituencies: 10

Area
  - Total: 4,361 km^{2} (1,684 sq mi)

Population (2011)
  - Total: 1,401,639
  - Density: 321.4/km^{2} (832.4/sq mi)
  - Urban: 316,828
- Time zone: UTC+05:30 (IST)
- Vehicle registration: TG 04
- Website: khammam.telangana.gov.in

Khammam district is a district in the eastern region of the Indian state of Telangana. The city of Khammam is the district headquarters. The district shares boundaries with Suryapet, Mahabubabad, Bhadradri districts and with the state of Andhra Pradesh.

== History ==
Paleolithic man probably roamed around the areas of lower Godavari valley and the surroundings of Wyra, Sathupalli Taluks in the district. Prehistoric rock paintings were found near Neeladri konda near Lankapalli of Sathupalli Taluk.

A megalithic site on the campus of Government Degree college in Khammam has yielded pottery and skeletal remains. Kistapuram of the district were rich in megalithic cultural remnants that were discovered and explored.

The southern parts of Khammam district flourished as famous Buddhist centers along with Amaravathi and Vijayapuri along the rivulets Munneru, Wyra and Murredu. Important Buddhist sites in the district are Nelakondapalli and Mudigonda

=== Post Independence ===
Khammam town which was the seat of Taluk Administration was a part of the larger Warangal district until 1 October 1953. Six taluks of the Warangal district viz., Khammam, Madhira, Yellandu, Paloncha, Kothagudem and Burgampadu were carved out as a new district with Khammam as headquarters. On 1 November 1956, Hyderabad state was dissolved, and Khammam district became part of Andhra Pradesh.

In 1959, Bhadrachalam revenue division consisting of Bhadrachalam and Nuguru Venkatapuram Taluks of East Godavari district, which were on the other side of the river Godavari were merged into Khammam on grounds of geographical contiguity and administrative viability. Aswaraopeta was also part of West Godavari District up to 1959. In 1973 a new taluk with Sathupalli as headquarters was carved out from Madhira and Kothagudem taluks. In the year 1976 three new taluks were formed viz., Tirumalayapalem, Aswaraopeta and Manuguru by bifurcating Khammam, Kothagudem and Burgampadu taluks respectively.

In the year 1985, following the introduction of the mandal system, the district has been divided into 46 mandals, under four Revenue Divisions – Khammam, Kothagudem, Paloncha and Bhadrachalam.

On 2 June 2014, Khammam together with nine other districts became the new state of Telangana, which was separated from Andhra Pradesh. On 11 July 2014, the Lok Sabha approved a bill transferring seven mandals of Khammam district (Kukunoor, Velairpadu, Bhurgampadu, Chintoor, Kunavaram, Vararamachandrapuram and Bhadrachalam) back to Andhra Pradesh, in order to facilitate the Polavaram Irrigation project.

== Geography ==
Khammam district occupies an area of 4,361 square kilometres (1,684 sq mi). It is surrounded by Suryapet district and Mahabubabad district to the west, Bhadradri Kothagudem district to the east, NTR district to the south and east, and Eluru district to the east.

== Demographics ==
Religion in Khammam district (2011)
Hinduism	92.29%
Islam	6.49%
Christianity	0.98%
Other or not stated	0.24%

As of 2011 Census of India, the district has a population of 1,401,639. Mahabubabad has a sex ratio of 1005 females per 1000 males and a literacy rate of 65.95%. 139,614 (9.96%) were under 6 years of age. 316,828 (22.60%) lived in urban areas. Scheduled Castes and Scheduled Tribes made up 279,319 (19.93%) and 199,342 (14.22%) of the population respectively.

At the time of the 2011 census, 83.09% of the population spoke Telugu, 10.21% Lambadi and 5.54% Urdu as their first language.

== Administrative divisions ==
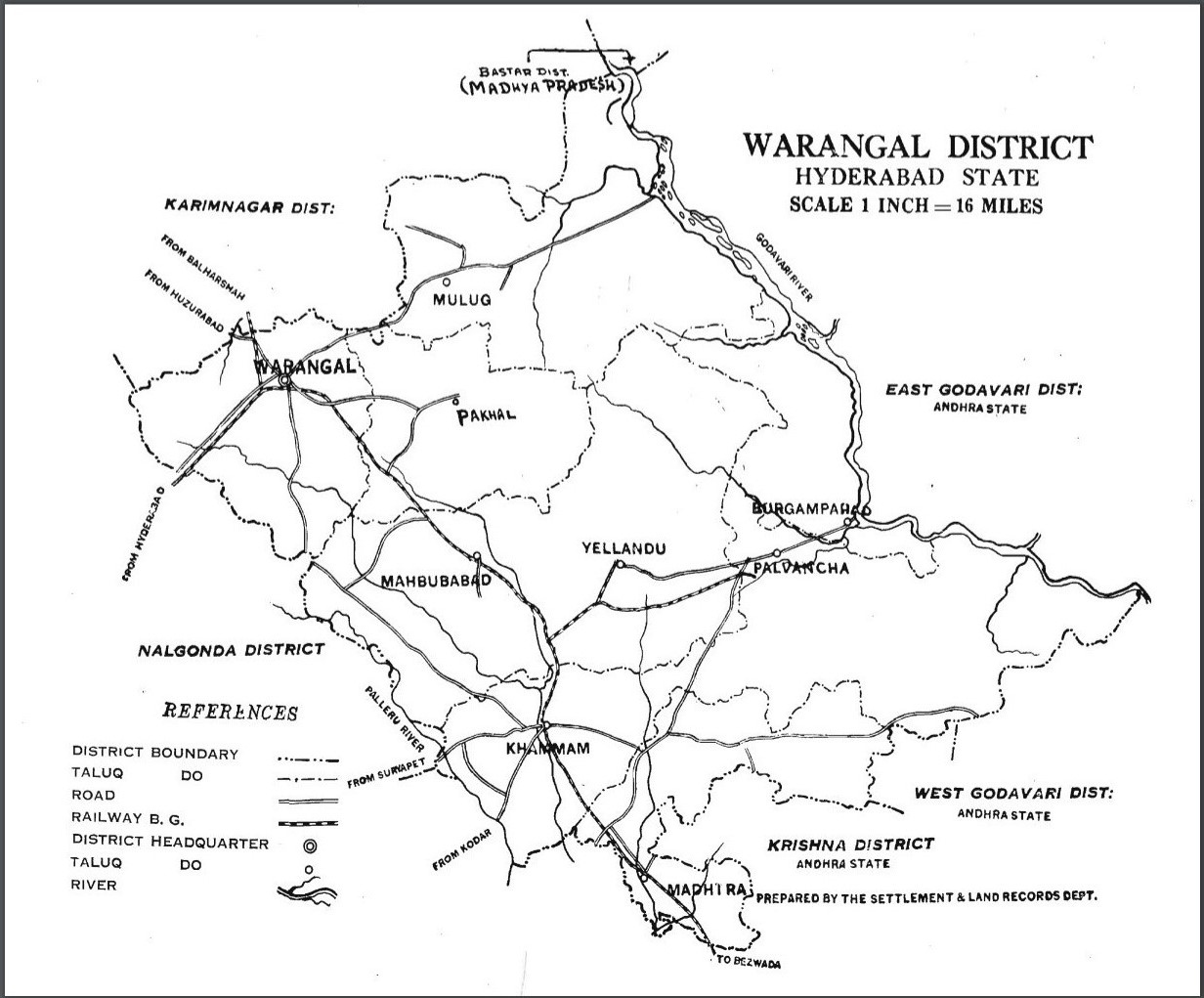
Khammam was part of Warangal District until 1953

The district has two revenue divisions of Kallur and Khammam. These are sub-divided into 21 mandals. V.P. Gautham is the present collector of the district.

=== Mandals ===
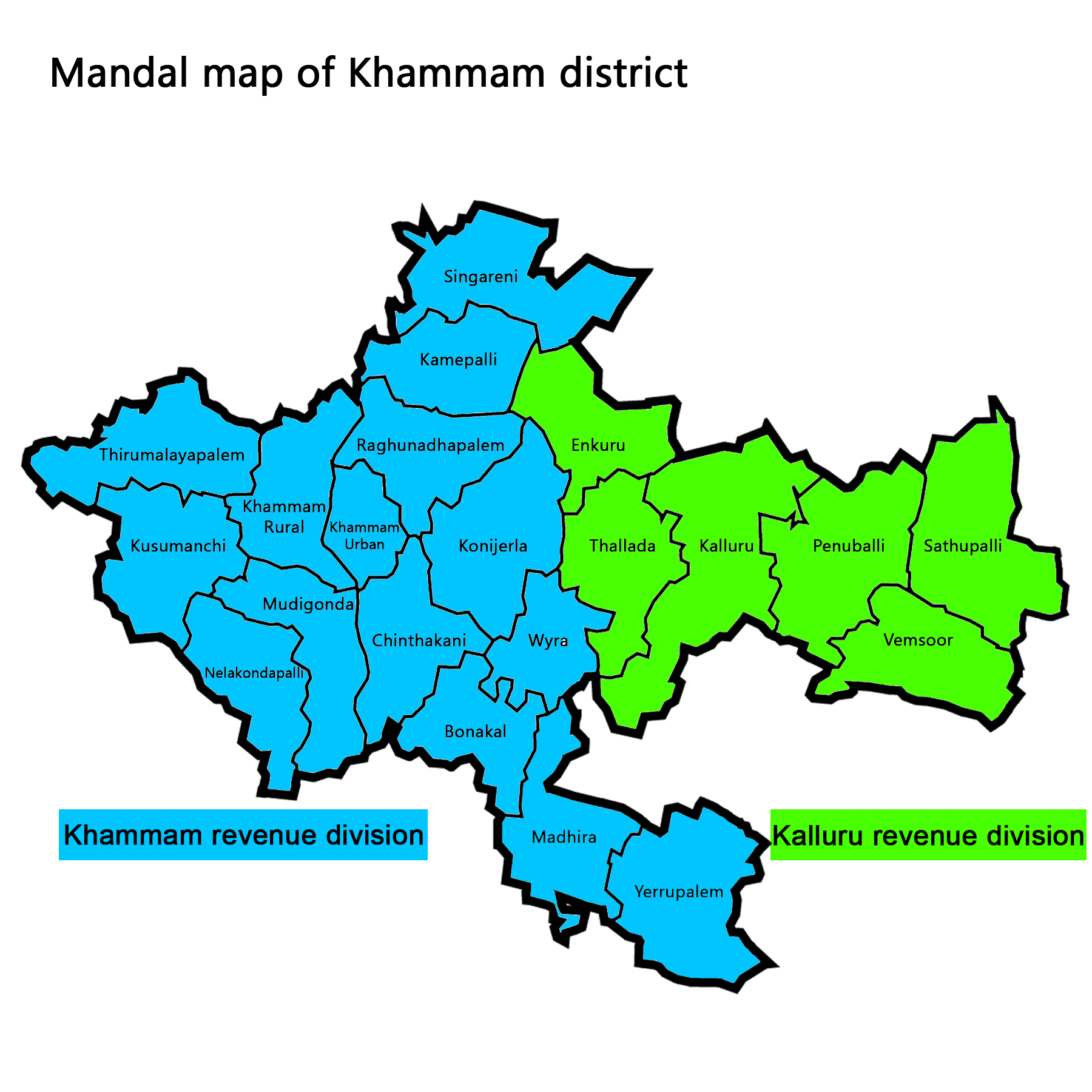
Mandals of Khammam district

The mandals of Chinturu, Kunavaram, Nellipaka and Vararamachandrapuram were added to East Godavari district based on Polavaram ordinance.

The list of 21 mandals in Khammam district under 2 revenue divisions are:

1. Kalluru revenue division
  1. Enkuru
  2. Kalluru
  3. Penuballi
  4. Sathupalli
  5. Thallada
  6. Vemsoor
2. Khammam revenue division
  1. Bonakal
  2. Chintakani
  3. Kamepalli
  4. Khammam (rural)
  5. Khammam (urban)
  6. Konijerla
  7. Kusumanchi
  8. Madhira
  9. Mudigonda
  10. Nelakondapalli
  11. Raghunadhapalem
  12. Singareni
  13. Tirumalayapalem
  14. Wyra
  15. Yerrupalem

== Politics ==
Khammam district comprises 5 Assembly constituencies and 1 Lok Sabha constituency.

Constituency number	Name	Reserved for: (SC; ST; None)	Parliament
112	Khammam	None	Khammam
113	Palair	None	Khammam
114	Madhira	SC	Khammam
115	Wyra	ST	Khammam
116	Sathupalli	SC	Khammam

== Economy ==
In 2006 the Indian government named Khammam one of the country's 250 most backward districts (out of a total of 640). It is one of the districts in Telangana currently receiving funds from the Backward Regions Grant Fund Programme (BRGF).

== Notable personalities ==
- The former Chief Minister of Andhra Pradesh(United), Jalagam Vengala Rao is from Khammam District. He served as 5th chief minister during 1973–78.
- Thummala Nageshwar Rao, minister for Roads and buildings, women and child welfare in Telangana State Government is from this region. He also occupied several ministerial portfolios in United Andhra Pradesh.
- Ponguleti Srinivas Reddy is an Indian Politician, represented Khammam Lok Sabha Constituency (2014–2019). In 2023, Mr Reddy elected from Palair Assembly Constituency. Currently serving as Cabinet Minister in Government of Telangana.
- Renuka Choudary, is an Indian politician and a member of the Indian National Congress, She has also served as the Union minister of State (Independent Charge) for Ministry of Women and Child Development and Tourism in United Andhra Pradesh in the Government of India.
- Nama Nageswara Rao served as Member of Parliament for 16th Lok Sabha of India. He is a businessman and owner of Madhucon Projects.At present 2020 he is the minister of Khammam district (TRS Party).
- Babu Mohan, notable actor and comedian in the Telugu film industry. He also served as Social Welfare Minister in TDP Government.
- Vandemataram Srinivas is a South Indian music director, actor and singer.
- K.Dasaradh is a Telugu film Writer, Director. He is well known for his films Santosham (2002) and Mr. Perfect.
- Srinivasa Reddy, notable actor and comedian in the Telugu film industry.
