= Gampalagudem =

- Village
- Interactive map of Gampalagudem
- Location in Andhra Pradesh, India Gampalagudem (India)
- Coordinates: 16.9985°N 80.5199°E
- Country: India
- State: Andhra Pradesh
- District: NTR
- Mandal: Gampalagudem
- Revenue division: Tiruvuru

Government
  - Type: Gram panchayat
  - Sarpanch: Kota Pullamma

Area
  - Total: 9.52 km^{2} (3.68 sq mi)
- Elevation: 67 m (220 ft)

Population (2011)
  - Total: 8,256
  - Density: 867/km^{2} (2,250/sq mi)

Languages
  - Official: Telugu
- Time zone: UTC+5:30 (IST)
- PIN: 521403
- Area code: +91-8673
- Vehicle registration: AP 16

Gampalagudem is a village situated in the NTR district of Andhra Pradesh, India. It serves as the headquarters of the Gampalagudem mandal, which is under the administration of the Tiruvuru revenue division. The village is located on the banks of the Kattaleru river and is situated at a distance of 74 km (46 mi) from the district headquarters Vijayawada.

The village is governed by the Gampalagudem Gram Panchayat, which is responsible for the local administration of the area. Gampalagudem mandal, which includes Gampalagudem, is a constituency mandal of Tiruvuru Assembly constituency. The assembly constituency is a part of the Vijayawada Lok Sabha constituency.

== Demographics ==
As of the 2011 Census of India, Gampalagudem has a total population of 8,256, it has a slightly higher male population of 4,175 compared to females, who make up 4,081 of the population. The child population stands at 776, out of which 417 are males and 359 are females. In terms of Scheduled Castes, the village has a significant population of 2,157, comprising 1,113 males and 1,044 females. The Scheduled Tribes, however, have a smaller population of 80, with 41 males and 39 females. The sex ratio in the village is 988 females per 1000 males.

Regarding literacy, the village has a total of 8,256 individuals, of which 5,310 are literate, with a literacy percentage of 64.3%. Out of the literate population, 2,961 are males, while 2,349 are females. On the other hand, the illiterate population stands at 2,946, with 1,214 males and 1,732 females.

Additionally, the village has 4,302 workers, out of which 2,524 are males, and 1,778 are females. The non-worker population stands at 3,954, with 1,651 males and 2,303 females.

== History ==
=== Gampalagudem Estate Peasant Uprising ===
During the 1920s and 1930s in India, while the fight for independence was happening, peasants in Gampalagudem, Andhra Pradesh, were also fighting against the zamindari system that exploited them. The zamindars collected revenue from the peasants in kind and tried to take public lands for their own use, which would have made things worse for the already struggling peasants. The peasants formed Kisan Sabhas and opposed the zamindars, but the government supported the zamindars. The zamindars responded with terrible atrocities against the peasants, which inspired the rural masses to join the fight for independence. The Gampalagudem peasant uprising is remembered as an important event in India's history of fighting against injustice and oppression.

Later, with the involvement of Gampalagudem's zamindar Kotagiri Venkata Krishna Rao, also known as Gampalagudem Raja, in the Indian independence movement made it significant because he was a prominent zamindar in the region. As a zamindar, Gampalagudem Raja was part of the system that exploited the peasants and collected revenue from them. However, he also recognized the injustices of the zamindari system and actively participated in the Indian independence movement.

== Climate ==
Gampalagudem experiences a hot climate throughout the year, characterized by high temperatures and moderate rainfall. The average high temperatures range from 32.2 degrees Celsius (90.0 °F)in December to 44.7 degrees Celsius (112.5 °F) in May and April, while the average low temperatures range from 12.7 degrees Celsius (54.9 °F) in December to 21.8 degrees Celsius (71.2 °F) in June and July. The highest recorded temperature in Gampalagudem was 47.1 degrees Celsius (116.8 °F) on June 2, 2008. On the other hand, the lowest recorded temperature was 9.3 degrees Celsius (48.7 °F) on January 23, 1997. Rainfall is a significant feature of the climate in Gampalagudem, with the highest average rainfall occurring in July (179.8 millimetres (7.08 in)) and August (225.9 millimetres (8.89 in)). The total annual rainfall in the region is approximately 982 millimetres (38.7 in). Despite the significant rainfall, the number of rainy days is relatively low throughout the year, with the highest number occurring in July and August. The average relative humidity ranges from 39% in March to 71% in September, with higher humidity levels during the monsoon months. Overall, Gampalagudem experiences hot temperatures, moderate rainfall, and varying levels of humidity throughout the year.

Climate data for Gampalagudem (Nandigama Station, located in Nandigama) 1989–2010, extremes 1989–2010
Month	Jan	Feb	Mar	Apr	May	Jun	Jul	Aug	Sep	Oct	Nov	Dec	Year
Record high °C (°F)	35.8 (96.4)	39.9 (103.8)	42.4 (108.3)	44.7 (112.5)	47.1 (116.8)	47 (117)	40.3 (104.5)	39.9 (103.8)	38.2 (100.8)	37.4 (99.3)	37.4 (99.3)	34.5 (94.1)	47.1 (116.8)
Mean daily maximum °C (°F)	33.4 (92.1)	36.6 (97.9)	39.8 (103.6)	42.4 (108.3)	44.7 (112.5)	42.4 (108.3)	38.1 (100.6)	36.1 (97.0)	35.8 (96.4)	34.8 (94.6)	33.2 (91.8)	32.2 (90.0)	44.5 (112.1)
Mean daily minimum °C (°F)	13.6 (56.5)	15.6 (60.1)	18.2 (64.8)	21.1 (70.0)	21.8 (71.2)	22 (72)	21.8 (71.2)	21.9 (71.4)	21.6 (70.9)	19.7 (67.5)	15.3 (59.5)	13.6 (56.5)	12.7 (54.9)
Record low °C (°F)	9.3 (48.7)	12.1 (53.8)	14.9 (58.8)	19.1 (66.4)	18.5 (65.3)	20.4 (68.7)	19.8 (67.6)	20.4 (68.7)	20.1 (68.2)	15.6 (60.1)	12.1 (53.8)	9.8 (49.6)	9.3 (48.7)
Average rainfall mm (inches)	11.8 (0.46)	7.7 (0.30)	14.1 (0.56)	13.9 (0.55)	46.2 (1.82)	117 (4.6)	179.8 (7.08)	225.9 (8.89)	188.7 (7.43)	138.3 (5.44)	28.2 (1.11)	10.4 (0.41)	982 (38.7)
Average rainy days	0.6	0.4	0.5	1	2.3	6.3	11.3	11.4	9.5	7.5	1.8	0.7	53.3
Average relative humidity (%) (at 17:30 IST)	49	44	39	39	46	49	62	68	70	71	64	56	54
Source: India Meteorological Department

== Economy ==
=== Agriculture ===
Gampalagudem has a predominantly agricultural-based economy. The village is renowned for the cultivation of crops such as paddy, chilli, mangoes and cotton. Additionally, there are also a few small-scale food processing units that specialize in processing mangoes and chillies, which are the major cash crops of the village. With its agricultural-based economy, provides work opportunities for migrants, especially in the cultivation and processing of crops.

=== Mines & Geology ===
Gampalagudem is a region that is rich in granite and crushed stone. Granite is a natural igneous rock that is composed of minerals such as quartz, feldspar, and mica. It is known for its durability, strength, and beauty, making it a popular choice for construction and architectural purposes. Crushed stone, on the other hand, is made from blasting and crushing large rocks into smaller pieces. It is commonly used as a base material for roads, pathways, and concrete structures. Gampalagudem's abundant supply of granite and crushed stone makes it a valuable resource for the construction industry, and it plays an important role in the economic development of the region.

=== Others ===
Gampalagudem is also known for its production of bricks, cement products, and furniture. These businesses play a significant role in the local economy, providing essential construction materials and furniture for various purposes.

== Transportation ==
=== Road ===
It has road connectivity with other towns and villages with state highways SH178 and SH198 passing through the village. Additionally, the village is connected to the National Highway 30 (India) through the Gampalagudem - Nuzivid (SH198) road. This road serves as an important link between the village and the national highway, facilitating the transportation of goods and people to and from Gampalagudem. Andhra Pradesh State Road Transport Corporation (APSRTC) operates a fleet of buses to Madhira, Tiruvuru, Vijayawada etc., which pass through Gampalagudem that connect it to other cities and towns.

=== Rail ===
There is no rail transport in Gampalagudem. The nearest railway station is Madhira railway station, which is located about 20 km (12 mi) away.

=== Air ===
The nearest airport to Gampalagudem is the Vijayawada International Airport, which is located in Gannavaram and is approximately 75 km (47 mi) away. For international travel, Rajiv Gandhi International Airport in Hyderabad is the nearest, located 266 kilometres (165 mi) away.

=== Kattaleru river bridge ===
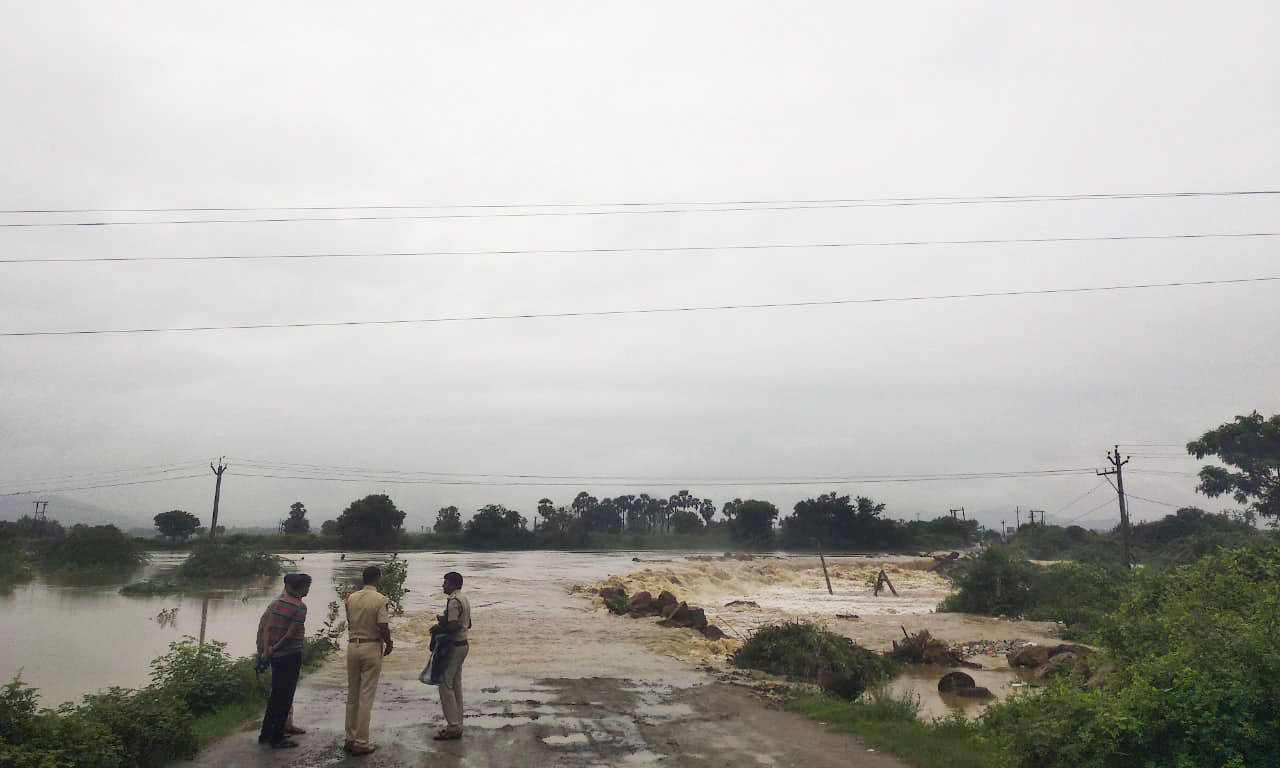
Kattaleru river flooding in July 2023

The Kattaleru river bridge on the Gampalagudem - Nuzivid (SH198) road in Gampalagudem, experienced partial damage in 2018 due to heavy rains. Temporary repairs were conducted to restore traffic. However, in 2020, the bridge was completely washed away during two heavy rainfalls and subsequent floods. As a result, all traffic on the bridge has been prohibited. This has caused significant inconvenience for the local residents, who now have to travel an additional 20 km to reach their destinations.

The bridge served as a crucial route for the people of Gampalagudem and nearby villages, such as Kanumuru, Anumollanka, Narikampadu, Vinagadapa, and Kothapalle, to access Gampalagudem. And the local population heavily relies on this bridge for employment, education, and medical purposes, regularly commuting to Vijayawada, Machilipatnam, and Nuzivid.

As of 2025, the construction of a new bridge over Kattaleru is yet to be completed. The bridge remains non-existent, and the local authorities have resorted to temporary repairs to mitigate the issue. However, whenever there is rainfall in the area, the Kattaleru river tends to flood, rendering these temporary repairs ineffective.

== Education ==
Gampalagudem has several educational institutions including Degree College, Junior Inter College, ZP High school and various private schools.

== Notable people ==
- Kotagiri Venkata Krishna Rao - Zamindar of Gampalagudem
- Kota Ramaiah - MLA (1972 - 1978) Tiruvuru Assembly constituency
