= State Highway 198 (Andhra Pradesh) =

Road in Andhra Pradesh, India

State Highway 198

Route information
- Maintained by Andhra Pradesh Road Development Corporation
- Length: 43.98 km (27.33 mi)

Major junctions
- From: Nuzvid, Eluru district, Andhra Pradesh
- State Highway 32 in Reddigudem; National Highway 30 in Cheemalapadu; State Highway 178 in Gampalagudem
- To: Gampalagudem, NTR district, Andhra Pradesh

Location
- Country: India
- State: Andhra Pradesh
- Districts: Eluru district NTR district
- Primary destinations: Nuzvid, Cheemalapadu, Narikampadu, Vinagadapa, Gampalagudem

Highway system
- Roads in India; Expressways; National; State; Asian; State Highways in Andhra Pradesh

State Highway 198 (Andhra Pradesh) is a state highway in the Indian state of Andhra Pradesh. Total length of SH198 is 43.98 kilometres (27.33 mi).

== Route ==
SH198 runs in Eluru and NTR districts of Andhra Pradesh, India. It starts from Nuzvid in Eluru district and passes through Goduguwarigudem, Reddigudem, Syampalem, Cheemalapadu, Narikampadu, Vinagadapa and ends at Gampalagudem in NTR district.

== See also ==
- List of state highways in Andhra Pradesh
