= Pedda =

Pedda may refer to:

- Pedda Adiserla Pally (Telugu: పెద్ద అడిసేర్ల పల్లి), a Mandal in Nalgonda district of Andhra Pradesh, India
- Pedda Elikicherla (Telugu: పెద్ద ఎల్కిచర్ల), a village and Gram panchayat in Kondurg mandal of Mahbubnagar district, Andhra Pradesh, India
- Pedda Gopathi, village in India's Andhra Pradesh state in the Khammam district
- Pedda kadabur, village and a Mandal in Kurnool district in the state of Andhra Pradesh in India
- Pedda Komera, the major village under Odela mandal with one small village (Chinna Komera) and two hamlets (Sandipally, Ilavenipally)
- Pedda Kothapalle (Telugu: పెద్దకొత్తపల్లి), a Mandal in Mahbubnagar district, Andhra Pradesh
- Pedda Orampadu, village in Obulavaripalle mandal, Kadapa District, Andhra Pradesh, India

== See also ==
- Pedda Bala Siksha, small encyclopedia in the Telugu language, suitable for children and adults
