= State Highway 178 (Andhra Pradesh) =

Road in Andhra Pradesh, India

State Highway 178

Route information
- Maintained by Andhra Pradesh Road Development Corporation
- Length: 29.75 km (18.49 mi)

Major junctions
- From: Tiruvuru, NTR district, Andhra Pradesh
- National Highway 30 in Tiruvuru; State Highway 198 in Gampalagudem
- To: Madhira, Khammam district, Telangana

Location
- Country: India
- State: Andhra Pradesh
- Districts: NTR district
- Primary destinations: Tiruvuru, Rolupadi, Chintalapadu, Gampalagudem, Meduru, Penugolanu, Rajavaram

Highway system
- Roads in India; Expressways; National; State; Asian; State Highways in Andhra Pradesh

State Highway 178 (Andhra Pradesh) is a state highway in the Indian state of Andhra Pradesh. Total length of SH178 is 29.75 kilometres (18.49 mi).

== Route ==
SH178 runs in NTR district of Andhra Pradesh, India. It starts from Tiruvuru and passes through Rolupadi, Chintalapadu, Gampalagudem, Meduru, Penugolanu and ends at Rajavaram. This road further connects with state highway in Telangana, linking it to Madhira town.

== See also ==
- List of state highways in Andhra Pradesh
