= Gampalagudem mandal =

- Mandal
- Interactive map of Gampalagudem mandal
- Location in Andhra Pradesh, India
- Coordinates: 16.9985°N 80.5199°E
- Country: India
- State: Andhra Pradesh
- District: NTR
- Headquarters: Gampalagudem

Area
  - Total: 209.65 km^{2} (80.95 sq mi)

Population (2011)
  - Total: 71,544
  - Density: 341.25/km^{2} (883.85/sq mi)

Languages
  - Official: Telugu
- Time zone: UTC+5:30 (IST)

Gampalagudem mandal is one of the 20 mandals in NTR district of the state of Andhra Pradesh in India. It is under the administration of Tiruvuru revenue division and the headquarters are located at Gampalagudem town. The mandal is bounded by Tiruvuru, A. Konduru mandals of NTR (formerly Krishna) district in Andhra Pradesh and Madhira, Yerrupalem mandals in Khammam district of Telangana state.

== Demographics ==
As of 2011 census, the mandal had a population of 71,544. The total population constitute, 36,215 males and 35,329 females with a sex ratio of 976 females per 1000 males. 7,071 children are in the age group of 0–6 years, of which 3,650 are boys and 3,421 are girls. The average literacy rate stands at 60.25% with 38,847 literates.

=== Religion ===
Religion in Gampalagudem mandal (2011)
Hinduism	93.7%
Muslim	4.1%
Christianity	1.8%
Sikh	0.01%
Buddhist	0.007%
Jain	0.001%
Other or not stated	3.4%

With a total population of 71,544, the majority of the population follows Hinduism, accounting for 67,110 individuals. Among them, there are 34,001 males and 33,109 females. Muslims form a significant minority, with 2,924 individuals, consisting of 1,466 males and 1,458 females. The Christian community also contributes to the religious landscape, with a population of 1,311, comprising 648 males and 663 females.

Sikhism, Buddhism, and Jainism have smaller presence in the Mandal. The Sikh community comprises 6 individuals, including 4 males and 2 females. Buddhists account for 5 individuals, with 3 males and 2 females. The Jain community is represented by a single male individual. Additionally, there are 4 individuals who belong to other religions and persuasions, including unclassified sects, with 1 male and 3 females.

A portion of the population, numbering 182 individuals, has not stated their religious affiliation. This group includes 91 males and 91 females. The population figures provided for each category represent the respective count for that particular religious group.

== Administration ==
Gampalagudem mandal is one of the 4 mandals under Tiruvuru (SC) (Assembly constituency), which in turn represents Vijayawada (Lok Sabha constituency) of Andhra Pradesh.

== Education ==
Gampalagudem mandal comprises 23 inhabited villages with the educational landscape of 1 pre-primary school, 21 primary schools, 17 middle schools, nine secondary schools, two senior secondary schools (SS), and 1 degree college of arts, science & commerce. However, there is currently no degree college of engineering or medical college in Gampalagudem mandal. And also the mandal does not have a management institute, polytechnic, vocational training school/ITI, non-formal training center, or a special school for the disabled.

== Health care ==
In Gampalagudem mandal, there is 1 primary health center and 11 primary health sub-centers that provide essential healthcare services to the community. Additionally, there are 2 veterinary hospitals to cater to the healthcare needs of animals in the area. In terms of medical practitioners, there are 3 doctors with an MBBS degree and 12 doctors with other degrees practicing in Gampalagudem mandal. The mandal also has 7 medicine shops where residents can purchase necessary medications.

== Towns and villages ==
As of 2011 census, the mandal has 21 villages. The settlements in the mandal are listed below:

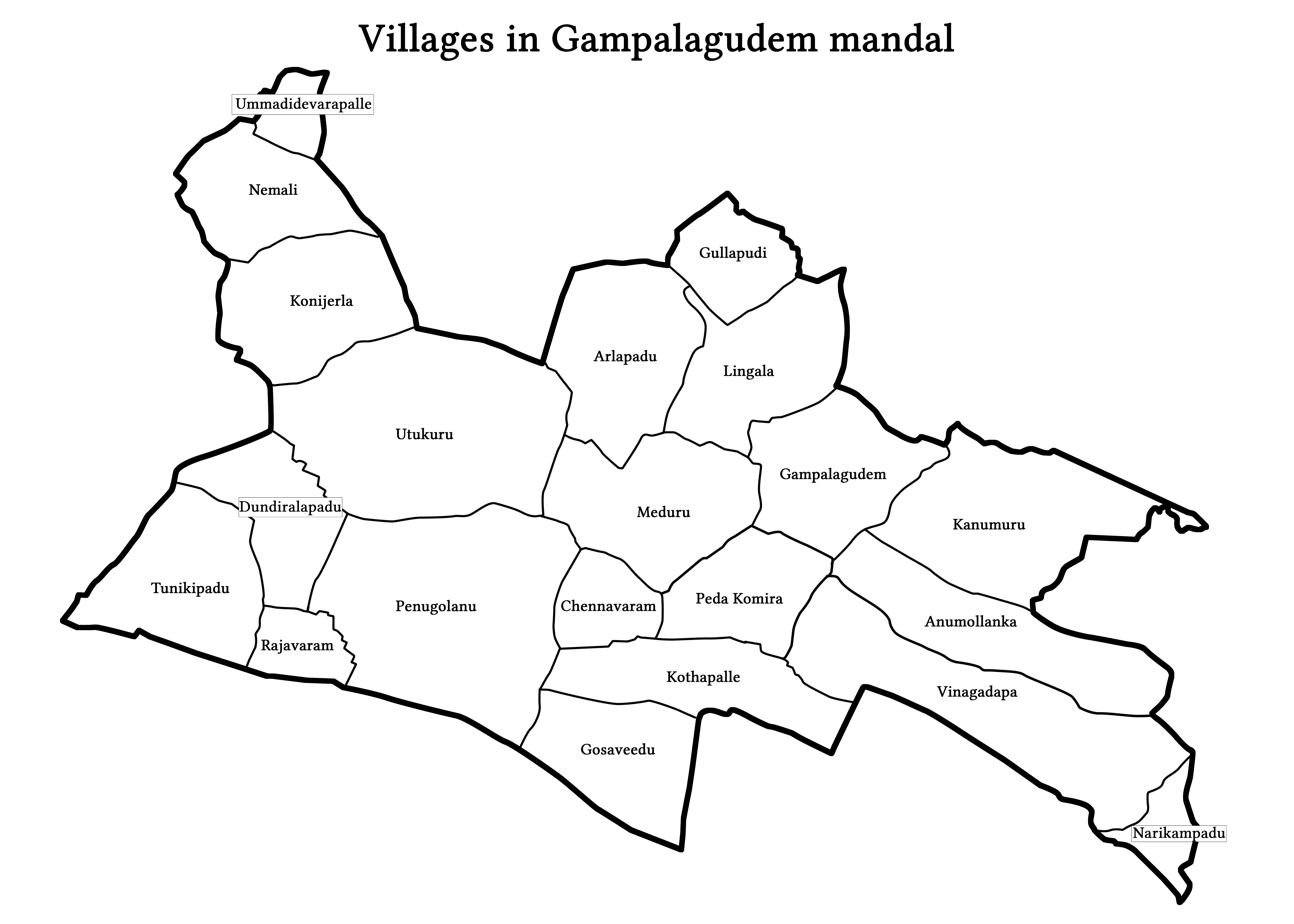
Settlements in Gampalagudem mandal with boundaries

=== Revenue villages ===
1. Anumollanka
2. Arlapadu
3. Chennavaram
4. Dundiralapadu
5. Gampalagudem - Mandal Headquarters
6. Gosaveedu
7. Gullapudi
8. Kanumuru
9. Konijerla
10. Kothapalle
11. Lingala
12. Meduru
13. Narikampadu
14. Nemali
15. Peda Komira
16. Penugolanu
17. Rajavaram
18. Tunikipadu
19. Ummadidevarapalle
20. Utukuru
21. Vinagadapa

=== Non-Revenue villages/Hamlets ===
1. Ammireddigudem
2. Challagundlavaripalem
3. Chinna Komira
4. Chintalanarva
5. Gadevarigudem
6. Gangadevipadu
7. Jinkalapalem
8. Ramannapalem
9. Satyalapadu
10. Sobbala

== Notable people ==
- Kota Ramaiah - MLA (1972 - 1978) Tiruvuru Assembly constituency from Gampalagudem
- Kotagiri Venkata Krishna Rao - Zamindar of Gampalagudem
- Rallabandi Kavitha Prasad - Poet from Nemali
- Gosaveedu Shaik Hassan - Traditional classical instrument player from Gosaveedu
- Nallagatla Swamy Das - Ex MLA (1994 - 2004), Tiruvuru Assembly constituency, from Anumollanka

== See also ==
- List of mandals in Andhra Pradesh
- List of revenue divisions in Andhra Pradesh
