= Yaru =

Yaru may refer to:

- Yaru, Iran, a village in Hormozgan Province, Iran
- Yaru, Pakistan, a town in Pakistan
- Yaru, Indonesia, an island in the Tanimbar Islands group
- Yaru Quechua, a dialect of the Quechua language
- the Yale Arbovirus Research Unit, a research laboratory at Yale University
