= Parava =

Parava may refer to:

- Parava, Bacău, a commune in Romania
- Parava, Iran, a village in Hormozgan Province, Iran
- Parava, a defunct ICANN Registrar
- Paravas, a Tamil caste in India
- Parava (film), a 2017 Indian film

== See also ==
- Kunaparaju Parava, a village in Reddigudem Md, Krishna District, A.P., India
