= Sobbala =

Village in Andhra Pradesh, India

- Village
- Interactive map of Sobbala
- Location in Andhra Pradesh, India Sobbala (India)
- Coordinates: 17.0305°N 80.5052°E
- Country: India
- State: Andhra Pradesh
- District: NTR
- Mandal: Gampalagudem

Government
  - Type: Gram Panchayat
  - Sarpanch: V Krishna Rao

Languages
  - Official: Telugu
- Time zone: UTC+5:30 (IST)

Sobbala is a village located in the Gampalagudem mandal, NTR district of the Indian state of Andhra Pradesh. This village is part of Lingala revenue and it is under the administration of Tiruvuru revenue division.
