= Oswald Couldrey =

British artist, poet, & author (1882–1958)

Oswald Jennings Couldrey
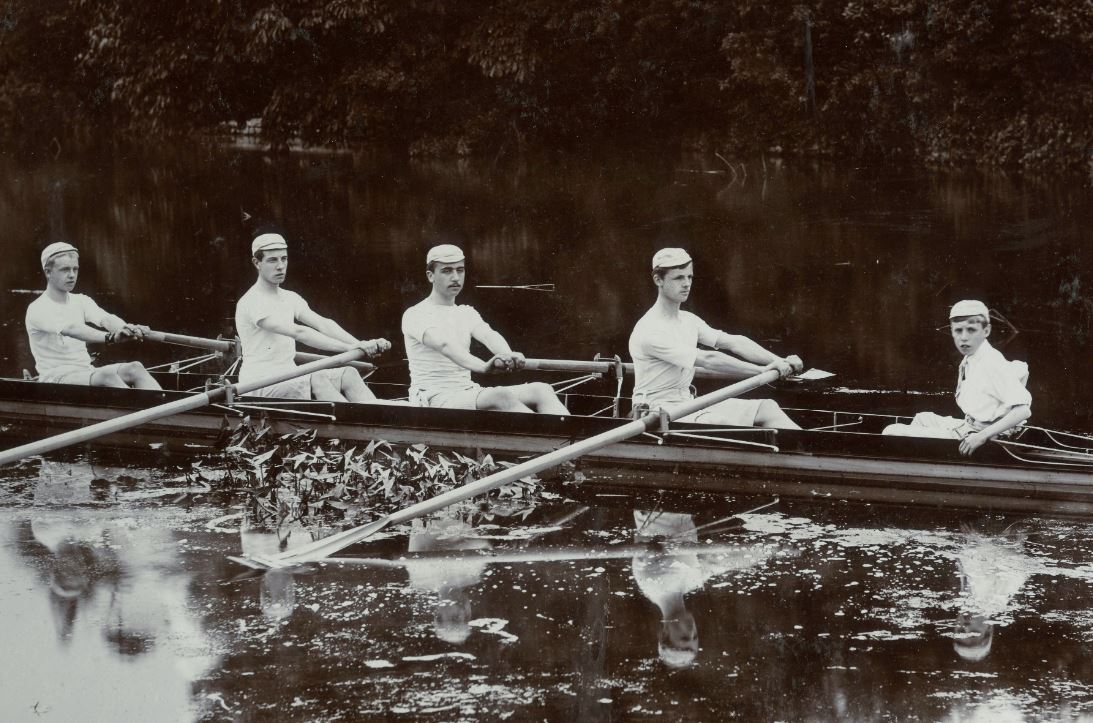
- Oswald Couldrey pictured in the first IV Abingdon School rowing team during 1901. Couldrey is in the centre of the five.
- Born: 20 September 1882; Abingdon-on-Thames, England
- Died: 24 July 1958 (aged 75); Abingdon-on-Thames, England

Oswald Jennings Couldrey (20 September 1882 – 24 July 1958) was a British artist, poet and author.

== Early life and education ==
The son of Frederick Knight Couldrey of Abingdon, Oswald Couldrey attended Abingdon School from 1892 to 1901. He attained first class honours in Divinity and English in 1900. He went to Pembroke College, Oxford in 1901 and won the Pembroke sculls and in 1903 achieved a third in Classical Moderations. Two years later he gained a third in Literae humaniores.

== Career ==
In 1906 he entered the Indian Civil Service, education branch, and became Principal of Government Arts College, Rajahmundry from 1909. He was 27 years old when he joined as Principal in Arts College, Rajahmundry. Historian Digavalli Venkata Siva Rao (1898–1992), who studied in Rajahmundry between 1910 and 1916, wrote about him in Telugu, as did Couldrey's friend and favourite student, Adivi Bapiraju, and a few others. Couldrey had to resign from his job in 1919 owing to problems of eyesight and hearing.

== Later life ==
He returned to England and to Abingdon in 1920. He died on 24 July 1958.

== Literary work ==
He established the Andhra School of Indian Arts and guided several Telugu artists and poets such as Damerla Rama Rao, Adivi Bapiraju and Kavikondala Venkata Rao.

As an artist, he painted many evocative Indian and Abingdon scenes in watercolour. As a literary author, his works include:

- The Mistaken Fury and other Lapses (1914)
- Thames and Godavery (1920)
- South Indian Hours (1924)
- Triolets and Epigrams (1948?)
- The Phantom Waterfall and other illusions (1949)
- Sonnets of East and West, with other verses (1951)
- Verses over Fifty Years (1958).

Wagtails on the River is one of his triolets.

Out of the reeds a wagtail flew,
And then another three or four;
And every time that I said "Shoo",
Out of the reeds a wagtail flew.
When I had counted twenty-two
I said, "There can't be any more."
Out of the reeds a wagtail flew;
And then another three or four,

He dedicated his book South Indian Hours, which was published in England in 1924, to his three favourite students: Adivi Bapiraju, Kavikondala Venkatarao and Damarla Venkata Ramarao. In that book he paid rich tributes to Telugu language "our Indian neighbours conscious of vague but proud tradition of ancient empire prefer to speak of Andhra Country. They talk Telugu, the northernmost and farthest spread and sweetest sounding of four great Dravidian languages". After Adivi Bapiraju died in September 1952, Couldrey wrote an article on him titled as "Memories of Adivi Bapirazu" This article in Triveni July 1953. Couldrey's article on Ajanta which was published in Geographical magazine was translated into Telugu and was published in Bharathi magazine.

== Extra curricular activities ==
He was popular with the students of the college, and he made friends with all sorts of people in the town. He loved river Godavari and was a good horseman and was often seen riding his horse on the shore of the river or at the outskirts of the town leading into forests. Some young men of the town used to join him, among them Vadrevu Venkata Narasimharao and Davuluri Prasada Rao. He was a good swimmer and would plunge into the Godavari river and swim across it. He was also a great sportsman and encouraged his students to take part in many kinds of manly sports such as horse riding, swimming, excursions, mountaineering, cricket, football, Hockey and tennis. He introduced the game of paper chase to be played in moonlight. Oswald Couldrey liked music, poetry, painting and fine arts and was himself a musician, poet and painter. He was soon attracted by the artistic aspects of Andhra culture. His famous drawing of 'gangireddu' (bullock play on a Hindu festival day) was published in 'Andhra Sarvaswamu'. Many other folk plays like puppet show, street dramas etc. He picked up lot of Telugu by careful listening of conversations, and folk songs. Hindu Theatrical Company used to send him complementary tickets for the dramas enacted by them. Couldrey gladly attended these dramas to make friends with the actors and Mr. A.S. Ram, the artist who used to draw scenery on the screen.

== Prominent contemporaries ==
In those days joining the Indian Educational Service (I. E. S.) was difficult and competitive for native Indians. Even if admitted, they were offered only junior level posts in the Colleges. During the times when Couldrey was Principal among those who entered I. E. S. and worked in the Rajahmundry Government College were S. Radhakrishnan who came there on transfer from Presidency College in 1916 in the Philosophy Department; Vissa Apparao in the Physics Department; and Vaddadi Subbarayadu in the Telugu Department who came there from the training college. All of them subsequently became famous and were well noted in their respective lines of specialisation. After he returned to England in 1920, Couldrey wrote to one of his erstwhile students about meeting his ex-colleague, S. Radhakrishnan in Oxford in 1927. Vaddadi Subbarayadu was a famous poet, he wrote Bhaktha Chintamani which went through eight editions by 1919. Vissa Apparao later became Principal of Andhra University College, Waltair, and also compiled and edited the famous volume of Thyagaraja kirthanalu in the edition of 1948.

== See also ==
- List of Old Abingdonians
