= Siva Rao (disambiguation) =

Siva Rao was a member of the Ghorpade Dynasty who served as the ruler of Sandur.

Siva Rao or Sivarao may also refer to:

- Digavalli Venkata Siva Rao, lawyer and writer
- Kavuri Samba Siva Rao, politician, engineer and industrialist
