= Kavikondala Venkata Rao =

Indian writer (1892–1969)

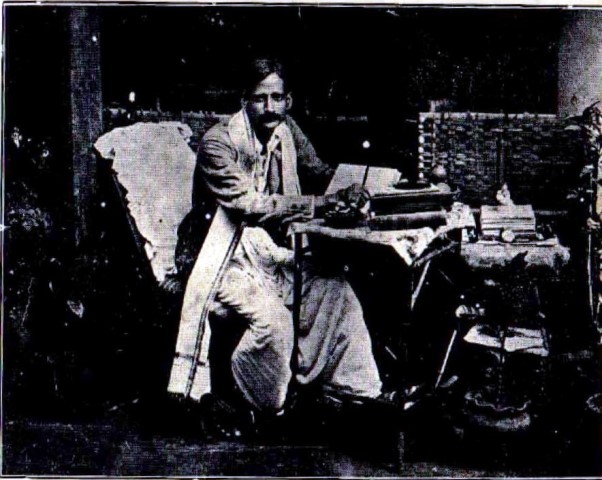
Kavikondala Venkata Rao

Kavikondala Venkata Rao (Telugu: కవికొండల వెంకటరావు; 20 July 1892 – 4 July 1969) was a Telugu language writer from Andhra Pradesh, India.

== Early life ==
Born at Srirangapattanam in East Godavari District he started writing in 1910. Over the next five decades he produced two hundred and plus short stories, two novels (Vijanasadanamu and Inupa kota), hundreds of poems and songs and lyrical ballads. He was popularly known as a poet of nature and dubbed the "Andhra Wordsworth" by his friend and mentor poet-painter, Mr Oswald Couldrey, the principal of Government Arts College, Rajahmundry. Adivi Bapiraju, Damerla Rama Rao, and Kavikondala Venkatarao were good friends of Mr. O. J. Couldrey. Kavikondala started writing poetry in English at age of 16 but Mr. Couldrey encouraged him to write songs in Telugu. He died in Guntur.

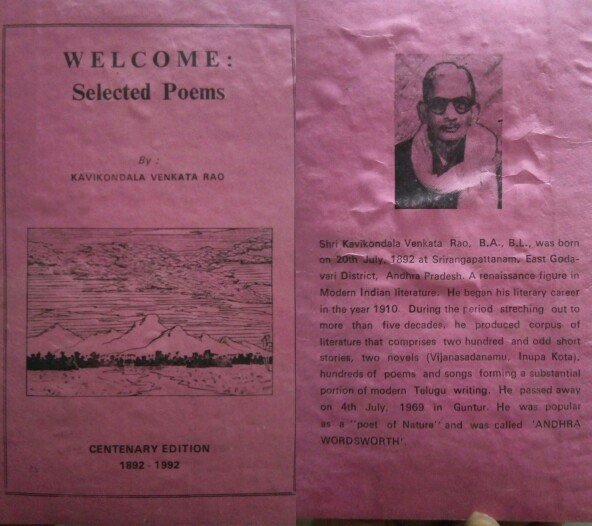
This is a book of Kavikondala Venkata Rao's poems, titled as 'WELCOME: Selected Poems', which has 60 of his poetry works!
