= Satyalapadu =

- Village
- Interactive map of Satyalapadu
- Location in Andhra Pradesh, India Satyalapadu (India)
- Coordinates: 16.9942°N 80.4865°E
- Country: India
- State: Andhra Pradesh
- District: NTR
- Mandal: Gampalagudem

Government
  - Type: Gram Panchayat
  - Sarpanch: Vennapusa Govardhana Reddy

Languages
  - Official: Telugu
- Time zone: UTC+5:30 (IST)

Satyalapadu is a village located in the Gampalagudem mandal, NTR district of the Indian state of Andhra Pradesh. It is under the administration of Tiruvuru revenue division.
