= Nemali =

- Village
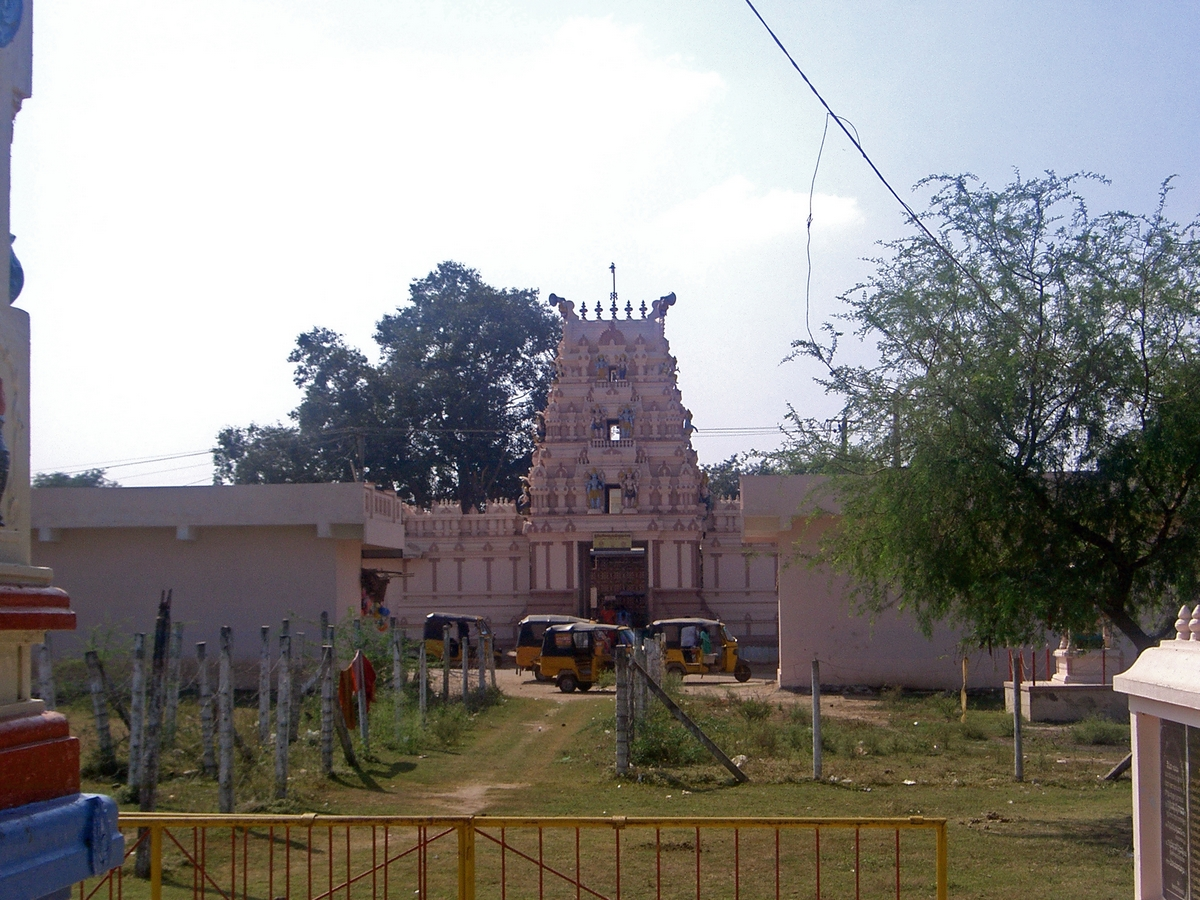
- Sri Venugopala Swamy Temple
- Interactive map of Nemali
- Location in Andhra Pradesh, India Nemali (India)
- Coordinates: 17.0678°N 80.3966°E
- Country: India
- State: Andhra Pradesh
- District: NTR
- Mandal: Gampalagudem

Government
  - Type: Gram panchayat
  - Sarpanch: Dubbakula Rama Krishna

Area
  - Total: 8.51 km^{2} (3.29 sq mi)

Population (2011)
  - Total: 2,867
  - Density: 337/km^{2} (873/sq mi)

Languages
  - Official: Telugu
- Time zone: UTC+5:30 (IST)
- PIN: 521401
- Lok Sabha constituency: Vijayawada
- Vidhan Sabha constituency: Tiruvuru

Nemali is a village located in the Gampalagudem mandal, NTR district of the Indian state of Andhra Pradesh. It is under the administration of Tiruvuru revenue division. The word Nemali means "peacock" in Telugu.

== Demographics ==
As of the 2011 Census of India, Nemali had a total population of 2,867 of which 1,481 were male and 1,386 female —a sex ratio of 936 females per 1000 males. There were 287 children in the 0–6 year age group of which 143 were boys and 144 girls. The average literacy rate stands at 62.29% with 1,607 literates, higher than the district average of 73.70%.

== Government and politics ==
Nemali falls under the administration of Gampalagudem mandal and is represented by the Tiruvuru Assembly constituency, which in turn represents Andhra Pradesh's Vijayawada Lok Sabha constituency.

== Notable personalities ==
Dr Rallabandi Kavitha Prasad - Poet
