= Ummadidevarapalle =

Village in Andhra Pradesh, India

- Village
- Interactive map of Ummadidevarapalle
- Location in Andhra Pradesh, India Ummadidevarapalle (India)
- Coordinates: 17.0784°N 80.4113°E
- Country: India
- State: Andhra Pradesh
- District: NTR
- Mandal: Gampalagudem

Government
  - Type: Gram Panchayat
  - Sarpanch: Thotakura Veera Prasad

Area
  - Total: 2.45 km^{2} (0.95 sq mi)

Population (2011)
  - Total: 862
  - Density: 352/km^{2} (911/sq mi)

Languages
  - Official: Telugu
- Time zone: UTC+5:30 (IST)

Ummadidevarapalle is a village located in the Gampalagudem mandal, NTR district of the Indian state of Andhra Pradesh. It is under the administration of Tiruvuru revenue division.

== Demographics ==
According to 2011 census of India, the village has 269 households with a total population of 862, consisting of 436 males and 426 females. The Scheduled Castes population is 388 (198 males, 190 females), and the Scheduled Tribes population is 45 (23 males, 22 females). A total of 460 people in the village are literate. The workforce includes 481 individuals, with 266 males and 215 females.
