= Gosaveedu =

Village in Andhra Pradesh & Telangana, India

- Village
- Interactive map of Gosaveedu
- Coordinates: 16.9318°N 80.4827°E
- Country: India
- State: • Andhra Pradesh • Telangana
- District: • NTR • Khammam
- Mandal: • Gampalagudem • Yerrupalem

Government
  - Type: Gram Panchayat
  - Sarpanch: Kandimalla Pipchaiah (AP); Kotthapalli Vidya Sagar (TS)

Area
  - Total: 13.79 km^{2} (5.32 sq mi)

Population (2011)
  - Total: 4,512
  - Density: 327.2/km^{2} (847.4/sq mi)

Languages
  - Official: Telugu
- Time zone: UTC+5:30 (IST)

Gosaveedu is a village situated in both the Indian states of Andhra Pradesh and Telangana. Half of the village is located within the Gampalagudem mandal, NTR district, as part of the Tiruvuru revenue division. The remaining portion of Gosaveedu extends into the Yerrupalem mandal in the Khammam district, specifically falling under the Khammam revenue division.

== Notable people ==
- Gosaveedu Shaik Hassan - Traditional classical instrument player
