= Dundiralapadu =

Village in Andhra Pradesh, India

- Village
- Interactive map of Dundiralapadu
- Location in Andhra Pradesh, India Dundiralapadu (India)
- Coordinates: 17.0043°N 80.4076°E
- Country: India
- State: Andhra Pradesh
- District: NTR
- Mandal: Gampalagudem

Government
  - Type: Gram Panchayat
  - Sarpanch: Banka Baburao

Area
  - Total: 8.13 km^{2} (3.14 sq mi)

Population (2011)
  - Total: 3,134
  - Density: 385/km^{2} (998/sq mi)

Languages
  - Official: Telugu
- Time zone: UTC+5:30 (IST)

Dundiralapadu is a village located in the Gampalagudem mandal, NTR district of the Indian state of Andhra Pradesh. It is under the administration of Tiruvuru revenue division.

== Demographics ==
According to 2011 census of India, in Dundiralapadu village, there are 858 households with a total population of 3,134 individuals (1,567 males and 1,567 females). The village has 1,376 individuals belonging to Scheduled Castes and 47 individuals from Scheduled Tribes. Out of the total population, 1,620 people are literate and there are 1,874 workers in the village.
