= Tunikipadu =

- Village
- Interactive map of Tunikipadu
- Location in Andhra Pradesh, India Tunikipadu (India)
- Coordinates: 16.9823°N 80.3871°E
- Country: India
- State: Andhra Pradesh
- District: NTR
- Mandal: Gampalagudem

Government
  - Type: Gram Panchayat
  - Sarpanch: Nidikonda Madhavi

Area
  - Total: 11.33 km^{2} (4.37 sq mi)

Population (2011)
  - Total: 3,422
  - Density: 302.0/km^{2} (782.3/sq mi)

Languages
  - Official: Telugu
- Time zone: UTC+5:30 (IST)

Tunikipadu is a village located in the Gampalagudem mandal, NTR district of the Indian state of Andhra Pradesh. It is under the administration of Tiruvuru revenue division.

== Demographics ==
According to 2011 census of India, In Tunikipadu village, there are 935 households with a total population of 3,422. The village has 1,004 individuals belonging to Scheduled Castes, and 159 individuals from Scheduled Tribes. Out of the population, 1,833 people are literate. The workforce consists of 1,897 individuals.
