= Cyclone Montha =

North Indian Ocean cyclone in 2025

Severe Cyclonic Storm Montha
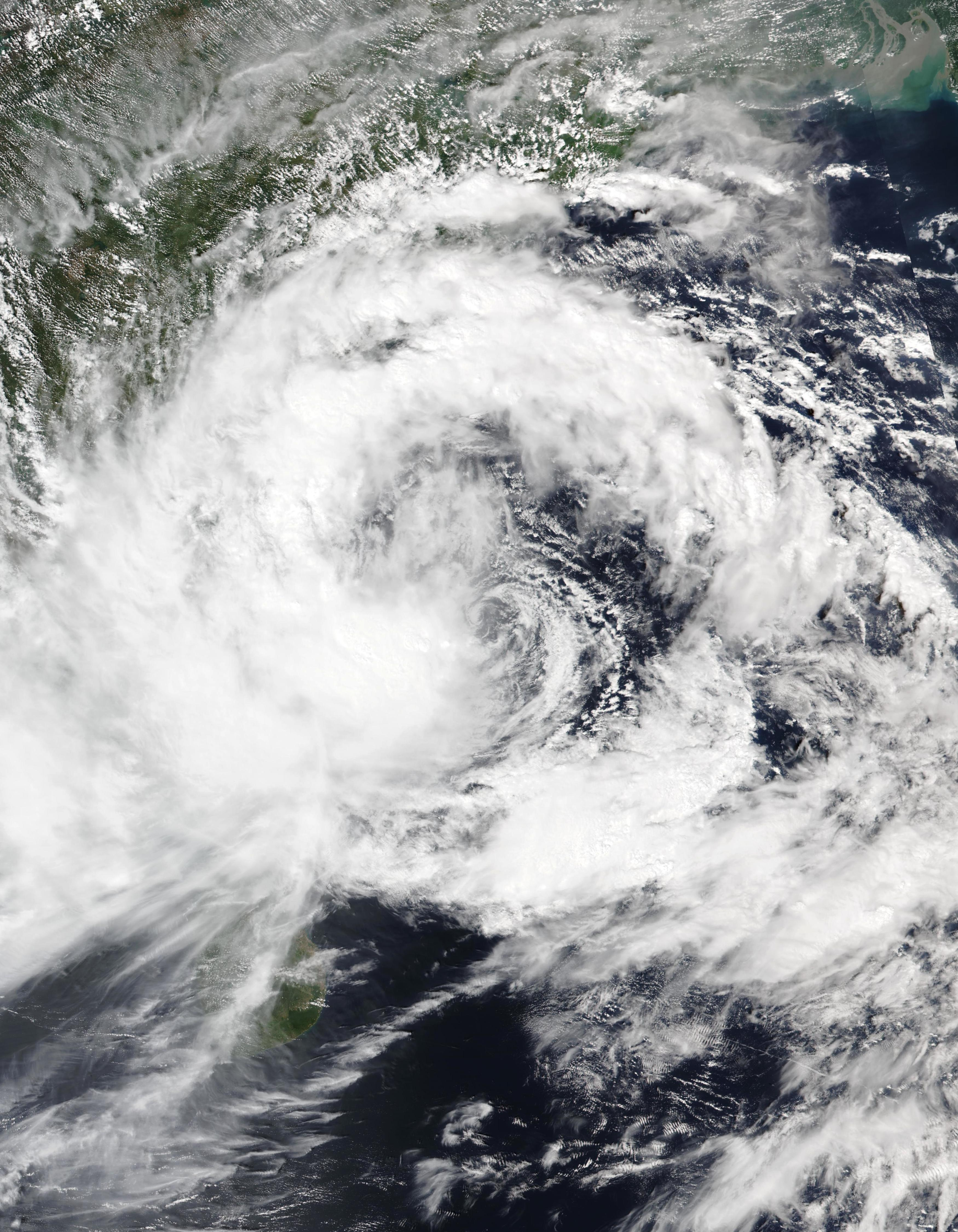
- Montha over the Bay of Bengal on 27 October

Meteorological history
- Formed: 25 October 2025
- Remnant low: 30 October 2025
- Dissipated: 31 October 2025

Severe cyclonic storm
- 3-minute sustained (IMD)
- Highest winds: 95 km/h (60 mph)
- Lowest pressure: 988 hPa (mbar); 29.18 inHg

Tropical storm
- 1-minute sustained (SSHWS/JTWC)
- Highest winds: 95 km/h (60 mph)
- Lowest pressure: 989 hPa (mbar); 29.21 inHg

Overall effects
- Fatalities: 8 direct, 7 indirect
- Injuries: 8 indirect
- Damage: $760 million (2025 USD)
- Areas affected: Andhra Pradesh, Odisha, Telangana, Puducherry, Tamil Nadu, Chhattisgarh, Nepal
- Part of the 2025 North Indian Ocean cyclone season

Severe Cyclonic Storm Montha (Note: The name Montha (Thai: มณฑา, [mon˧ tʰaː˧]) was contributed by Thailand and refers to the egg magnolia (Magnolia liliifera) in Thai.) was a moderately costly tropical cyclone that affected Andhra Pradesh, Telangana, Odisha, and Tamil Nadu in October 2025 and later indirectly caused a disastrous avalanche in Nepal in November 2025. The twelfth depression, fifth deep depression, second cyclonic storm, and second severe cyclonic storm of the 2025 North Indian Ocean cyclone season, Montha formed over the southeast Bay of Bengal from an upper-level circulation on 25 October, it quickly strengthened into a severe cyclonic storm before making landfall near Narasapuram in Andhra Pradesh around midnight on 29 October, where it caused two fatalities. Over land, it moved northwards, weakening into a deep depression over Telangana, where it caused six additional deaths, and then a depression over Chhattisgarh. Montha degenerated into a remnant low on 30 October over Jharkhand and brought rainfall to Nepal before becoming a low-pressure area on 31 October. Its effects indirectly resulted in an avalanche that killed seven climbers and injured eight. In its aftermath, Andhra Pradesh deployed drones to assist in rescue efforts and requested aid from the Indian government to help recover.

== Meteorological history ==
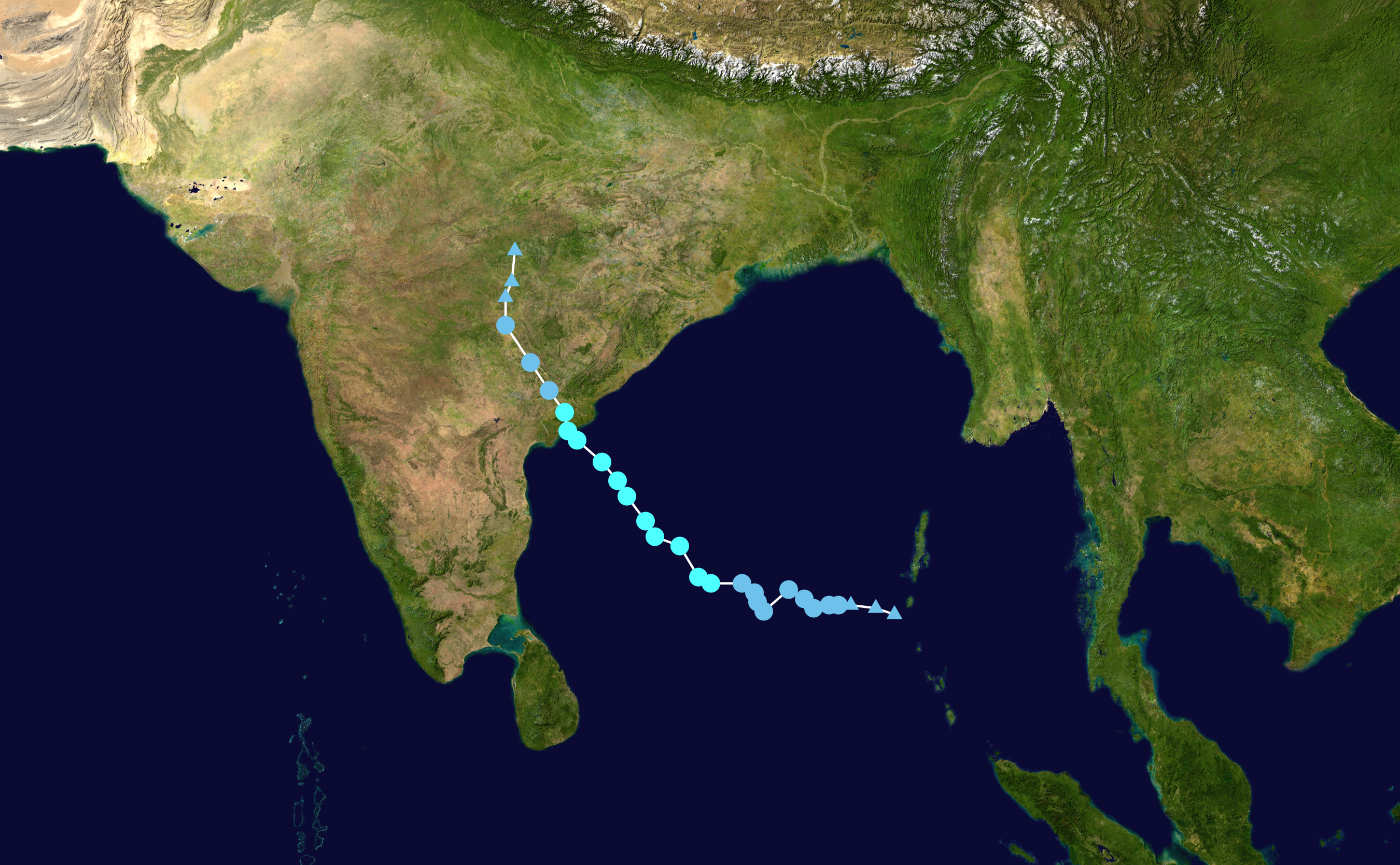
Map plotting the storm's track and intensity, according to the Saffir–Simpson scale Map key Saffir–Simpson scale Tropical depression (≤38 mph, ≤62 km/h) Tropical storm (39–73 mph, 63–118 km/h) Category 1 (74–95 mph, 119–153 km/h) Category 2 (96–110 mph, 154–177 km/h) Category 3 (111–129 mph, 178–208 km/h) Category 4 (130–156 mph, 209–251 km/h) Category 5 (≥157 mph, ≥252 km/h) Unknown Storm type Tropical cyclone Subtropical cyclone Extratropical cyclone, remnant low, tropical disturbance, or monsoon depression

On 23 October, the India Meteorological Department (IMD) noted the presence of an upper-level circulation over the southeast Bay of Bengal and gave it a high chance of formation into at least a depression within 72-96 hours. The circulation developed intense convection later that day, and a low-pressure area formed as a result early on 24 October. The disturbance moved west-northwards that day and was designated a well-marked low-pressure area with a central pressure of 1,005 mbar (29.7 inHg). On 25 October, it strengthened into a depression while moving westwards. Following further strengthening, it was designated a deep depression on 26 October. Curved banding and increased convection was observed to the north of the center on 27 October, after which it was named Cyclonic Storm Montha. The cyclone continued intensifying while moving northwestwards throughout the day as a complete curved banding pattern appeared, and became a severe cyclonic storm the next day. Montha then reached its peak intensity with winds of 95 km/h (60 mph) and a minimum central pressure of 988 mbar (29.2 inHg) later that day. It made landfall near Narasapuram at midnight on 29 October at peak intensity. Following landfall, Montha weakened first into a cyclonic storm as it moved inland, and then into a deep depression over northern Andhra Pradesh. Further weakening occurred as the system moved over southern Chhattisgarh, becoming a depression. Montha degenerated into a remnant low while moving northwards on 30 October. The remnant continued northwards, being located over northern Chhattisgarh on 31 October. The IMD issued its last advisory on Montha later that day as it further weakened into a low-pressure area over northwest Jharkhand.

== Preparations ==
On 27 October, the IMD placed seven districts in Kerala under a yellow alert for 28 October. Five districts in Tamil Nadu were placed under an orange alert, and six were placed under a yellow alert along with Puducherry. Districts on the coasts of Andhra Pradesh and Odisha were placed under a red alert on 28 October, indicating the possibility of extremely heavy amounts of rainfall.. Heavy rain alerts were also issued for Andhra Pradesh and Tamil Nadu. For the Vidarbha region of Maharashtra and parts of Madhya Pradesh, Gujarat, West Bengal, and Rajasthan, a yellow alert was sent out.

In Andhra Pradesh, 38,000 residents were evacuated and 1,906 storm shelters were readied. Schools in the state were closed until 29 October. In Odisha, 32,000 people were moved to storm shelters. Train services in Andhra Pradesh, Odisha, and Telangana were suspended. The National Disaster Response Force deployed 25 teams across multiple states.

== Impact ==
=== Andhra Pradesh ===
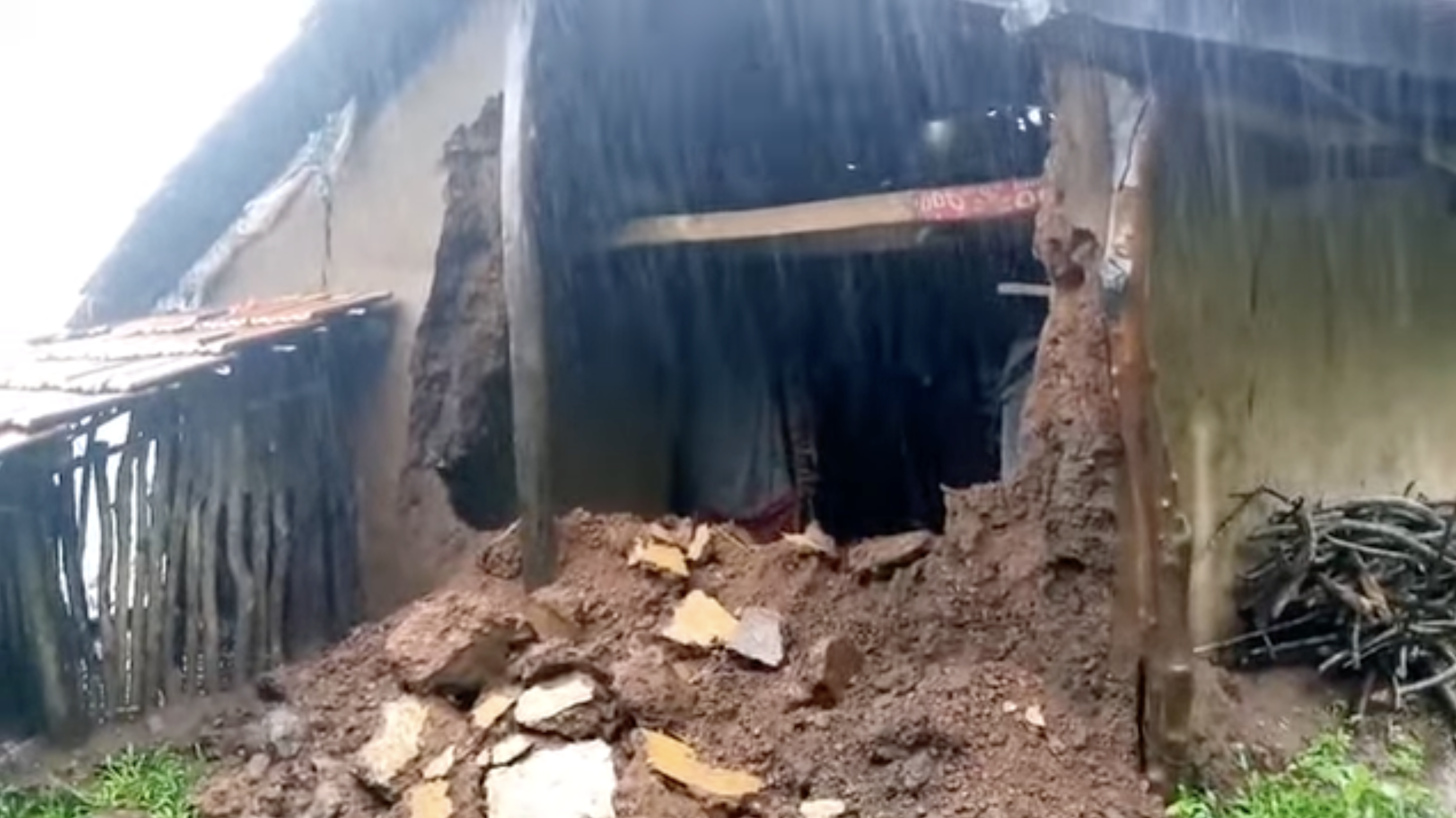
A collapsed house in Gangaraju Madugula following Cyclone Montha

Montha caused heavy rain in Andhra Pradesh, with Ongole recording 25 cm of precipitation as the cyclone made landfall. 87,000 hectares of crops were damaged, as well as 14 bridges and multiple roads. In Uppada, 61 houses were damaged, and 268 trees were downed in Narasapuram. 42 cattle were killed in the state and 1.8 million people were affected. Rural water damage and irrigation damage totaled ₹524,500,000 (equivalent to ₹540 million or US$5.8 million in 2026). 13,000 power lines and 3,000 transformers were damaged.

The Munneru River overflowed near Lingala, NTR district. Farmers attempted to save crops which were near it. Roads were damaged, cutting off transportation for most vehicles. In the second tunnel of the Veligonda Project, 250 workers were rescued. Both tunnels were flooded for a length of 10 kilometers. In a meeting on 29 October, Chief Minister N. Chandrababu Naidu said that Montha caused two deaths in the state. One of the victims was a 43-year-old woman who died after being crushed by a collapsing tree.

=== Telangana ===
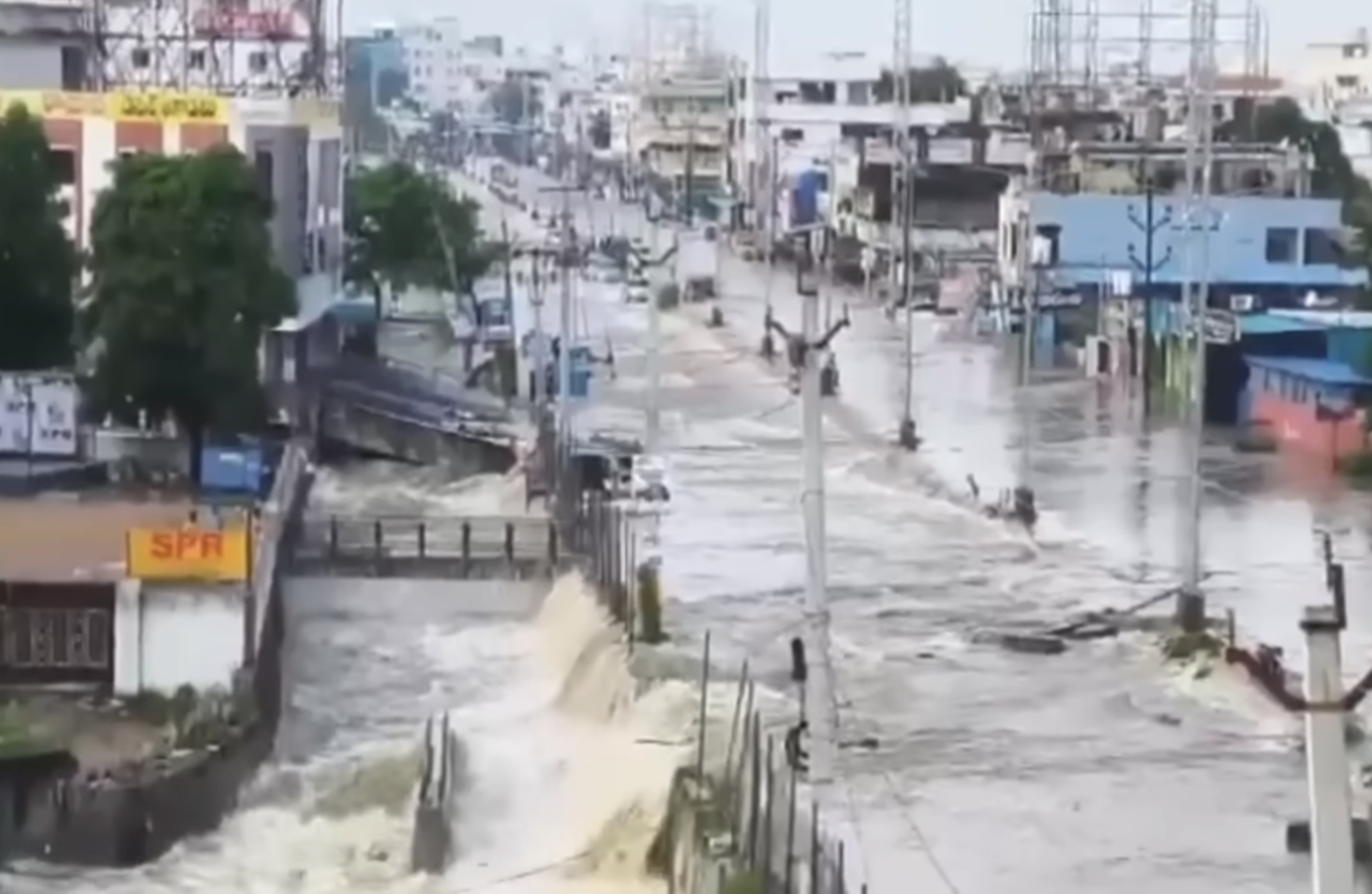
Flooding from Cyclone Montha on a street in Telangana

Severe flooding occurred in Telangana after Montha's movement into the state following weakening into a deep depression. Bheemadevarpalle recorded 419 millimetres (16.5 in) of rainfall over a 25.5 hour period, while 35 other locations recorded over 205 millimetres (8.1 in). 500 students in Nalgonda district were rescued from an isolated school. A man in the Vikarabad district was rescued after being washed away by the Kagna River.

Six deaths occurred in Telangana. A couple in Siddipet were swept away by floodwaters while riding on a vehicle. A woman in Jangaon was killed by floodwaters after she was dragged beneath them. A man in Suryapet was crushed by a falling tree. A woman was killed in Mahabubabad when a wall caved in on her, and a man in Warangal died in his home due to flooding. Several others were reported missing.

=== Nepal ===
Montha impacted Nepal as a remnant low, originally bringing heavy rainfall. 210 millimetres (8.3 in) of rainfall was recorded in Sundar Haraicha over a 24 hour period. In Baramjhiya, 143 millimetres (5.6 in) of rainfall was recorded. Two other locations recorded rainfall above 90 millimetres (3.5 in), and 24 recorded rainfall in the 50–80 millimetres (2.0–3.1 in) range. Lalitpur recorded 72 millimetres (2.8 in) and Kathmandu recorded 40 millimetres (1.6 in).

Sudden weather changes following the heavy rainfall caused by Montha likely contributed to an avalanche at a base camp on the mountain of Yalung Ri on 3 November. Seven climbers were killed by the avalanche — three Italians, two Nepalis, one German and one French. Eight others were injured. Four of the injured climbers were rescued and taken to Kathmandu by helicopter for medical attention, while the remaining four were guides who were taken to the Na village for treatment. On 4 November, rescuers began searching for the bodies of the victims, and three bodies were retrieved by that afternoon. Five missing climbers were unable to be located, and the search ended on 7 November.

=== Elsewhere ===
In southern Odisha, Montha's outer bands caused multiple trees to fall, obstructing roads. Landslides isolated parts of Paralakhemundi, R. Udayagiri, and Kashipur. Gosani in the Gajapati district received 150 millimetres (5.9 in) of rainfall over a 24-hour period, while Patrapur received 120 millimetres (4.7 in). 32 other locations in the state also recorded heavy rainfall. In Tamil Nadu, Ennore had 130 millimetres (5.1 in) of rainfall over the 24-hour period when Montha made landfall. Other areas around Chennai received "light to moderate" rainfall. Precipitation occurred as far south as Kanyakumari.

== Aftermath ==
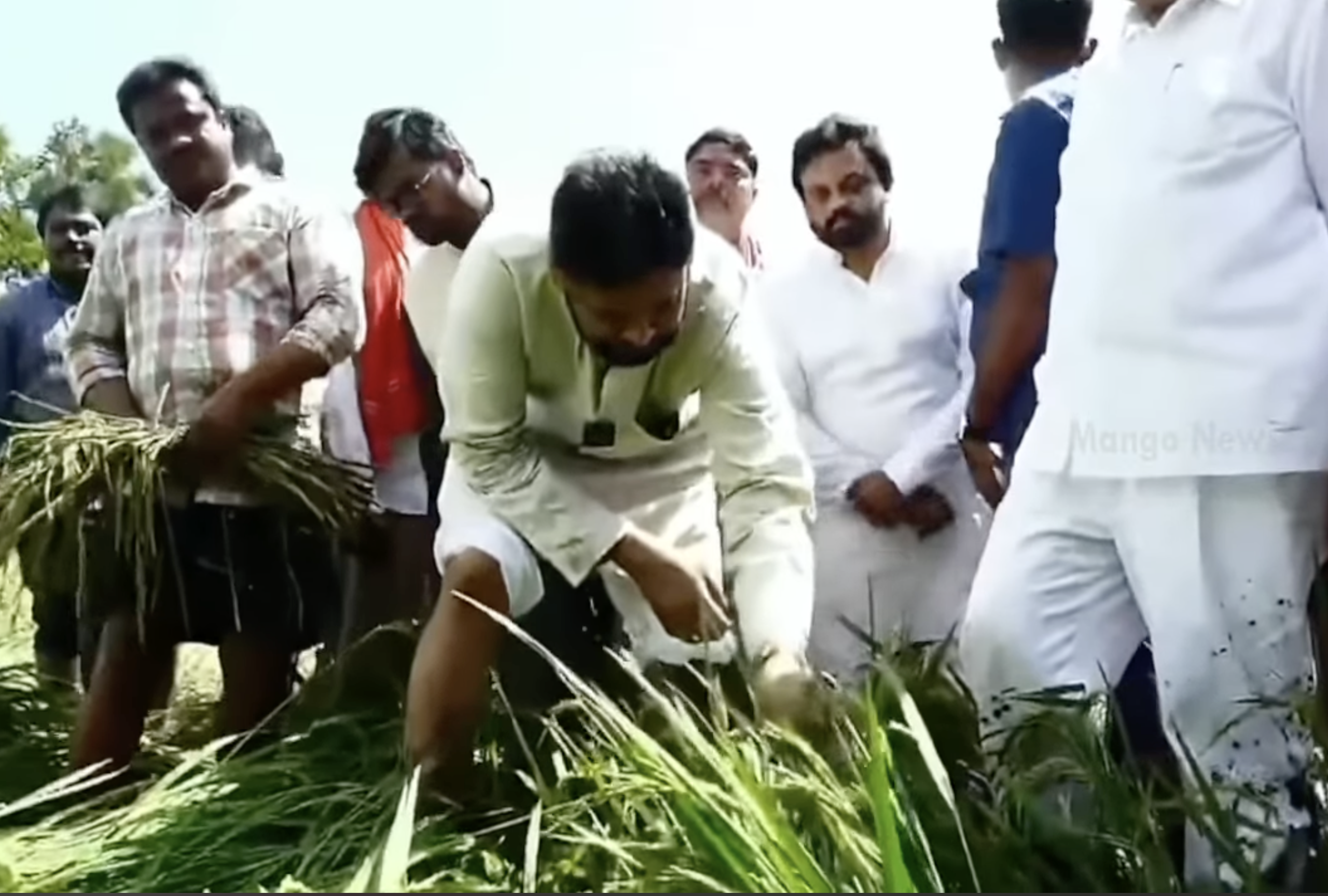
Andhra Pradesh Deputy Chief Minister Pawan Kalyan surveys crop damage in the Krishna district following Cyclone Montha

After the passage of Montha, damage was estimated at US$603 million. The chief minister of Andhra Pradesh, N. Chandrababu Naidu, visited Konaseema to survey the damage caused by Montha on 30 October. Each person who took shelter in the relief camps set up before the cyclone was given ₹1,000 (equivalent to ₹1,000 or US$11 in 2026). Families with more than three members received up to ₹3,000 (equivalent to ₹3,100 or US$33 in 2026). Andhra Pradesh's fire department removed 117 downed trees following the cyclone. The body of a woman was found inside one of the trees. To carry out rescue operations in Andhra Pradesh, drones were deployed. With the help of the drones, police were able to rescue a man in Parchur who was swept away by floodwaters and were able to identify a boat which had washed away in the Krishna River. A team from the federal government visited Prakasam district on 10 November to assess the damage caused by the cyclone. The total damage was reassessed to ₹63,840,000,000 (equivalent to ₹66 billion or US$700 million in 2026) the same day, and Andhra Pradesh requested ₹9,010,000,000 (equivalent to ₹9.3 billion or US$99 million in 2026) from the Indian government as assistance to recover.

== See also ==
- Tropical cyclones in 2025
- Cyclone Hudhud – also made landfall in Andhra Pradesh and affected Nepal
- 1995 India cyclone – also produced a deadly avalanche in Nepal
