= A. Konduru =

Atlapragada Konduru A. Konduru
- Village
- Interactive map of Atlapragada Konduru
- Location in Andhra Pradesh, India
- Coordinates: 16.9670°N 80.6507°E
- Country: India
- State: Andhra Pradesh
- District: NTR
- Mandal: Atlapragada Konduru

Area
  - Total: 21.90 km^{2} (8.46 sq mi)

Population (2011)
  - Total: 6,462
  - Density: 295.1/km^{2} (764.2/sq mi)

Languages
  - Official: Telugu
- Time zone: UTC+5:30 (IST)

Atlapragada Konduru, commonly known as A. Konduru, is a village in NTR district of the Indian state of Andhra Pradesh. It is the mandal headquarters of A. Konduru mandal under Tiruvuru revenue division.

== Demographics ==
As of the 2011 Census of India, the village had a population of 6,462. The total population constitute, 3,101 males and 3,361 females. Average sex ratio of the village is 1084 females per 1000 males, higher than the national average of 940 per 1000. 647 children are in the age group of 0–6 years, of which 350 are boys and 297 are girls. The average literacy rate stands at 55.86% with 3,248 literates, significantly lower than the national average of 73.00%.

== Economy ==
Agriculture produced in the village includes Banginapalli, Totapuri and other varieties of mangoes in the abundant mango orchards of Mylavaram, which are exported around the world.
