= Chennavaram =

Village in Andhra Pradesh, India

- Village
- Interactive map of Chennavaram
- Location in Andhra Pradesh, India Chennavaram (India)
- Coordinates: 16.9774°N 80.4810°E
- Country: India
- State: Andhra Pradesh
- District: NTR
- Mandal: Gampalagudem

Area
  - Total: 5.88 km^{2} (2.27 sq mi)

Population (2011)
  - Total: 644
  - Density: 110/km^{2} (284/sq mi)

Languages
  - Official: Telugu
- Time zone: UTC+5:30 (IST)

Chennavaram is a village located in the Gampalagudem mandal, NTR district of the Indian state of Andhra Pradesh. It is under the administration of Tiruvuru revenue division.

== Demographics ==
According to 2011 census of India, in Chennavaram village, there are 183 households with a total population of 644 individuals. Among them 239 individuals belonging to Scheduled Castes. Out of the population, 256 people are literate and there are 385 individuals engaged in work.
