= Damerla =

Damerla or Damarla is a Telugu surname. Notable people with the surname include:

- Damerla Chennappa Nayakudu (died 1580), general under the Aravidu Dynasty.
- Dipika Damerla (fl. 2011), Canadian politician
- Damerla Rama Rao (1897–1925), Indian artist
