= Konijerla, NTR district =

Village in NTR district, Andhra Pradesh, India

Konijerla
- Village
- Interactive map of Konijerla
- Location in Andhra Pradesh, India Konijerla (India)
- Coordinates: 17.0478°N 80.4052°E
- Country: India
- State: Andhra Pradesh
- District: NTR
- Mandal: Gampalagudem

Government
  - Type: Gram Panchayat
  - Sarpanch: Elavarapu Nagamani

Area
  - Total: 11.38 km^{2} (4.39 sq mi)

Population (2011)
  - Total: 3,652
  - Density: 320.9/km^{2} (831.2/sq mi)

Languages
  - Official: Telugu
- Time zone: UTC+5:30 (IST)

Konijerla is a village located in the Gampalagudem mandal, NTR district of the Indian state of Andhra Pradesh. It is under the administration of Tiruvuru revenue division.

== Demographics ==
According to 2011 census of India, in Konijerla village, there are 1,047 households with a total population of 3,652 with 1,838 males and 1,814 females. There are 1,375 individuals belonging to Scheduled Castes and 158 to Scheduled Tribes. Out of the population, 1,820 are literate, and the village has 2,081 workers.
