= Vissannapeta =

- Village
- Interactive map of Vissannapeta
- Location in Andhra Pradesh, India
- Coordinates: 16.9398°N 80.7828°E
- Country: India
- State: Andhra Pradesh
- District: NTR
- Mandal: Vissannapeta

Area
  - Total: 24.15 km^{2} (9.32 sq mi)
- Elevation: 127 m (417 ft)

Population (2025)
  - Total: 22,000
  - Density: 910/km^{2} (2,400/sq mi)

Languages
  - Official: Telugu
- Time zone: UTC+5:30 (IST)
- PIN: 521215
- Telephone code: +91-08673
- Vehicle registration: AP 39
- Lok Sabha constituency: Vijayawada
- Vidhan Sabha constituency: Tiruvuru

Vissannapeta is a village in NTR district of the Indian state of Andhra Pradesh. It is a Municipality in Vissannapeta mandal of Tiruvuru revenue division. It is also a mandal head quarter.

== Demographics ==
As per the 2011 Census, the total population of Vissannapeta is 17,852, with 9,018 males and 8,834 females, resulting in an average sex ratio of 980. In terms of literacy, Vissannapeta has a 78% literacy rate. The male literacy rate is 83.08%, while the female literacy rate is 72.83%.

== Economy ==
Agriculture is the main occupation. The Mango orchards are in abundant with Banginapalli, Totapuri and other varieties. Mangos are exported to Dubai, Hongkong, London and Singapore.

== See also ==
- Villages in Vissannapeta mandal
