= Digavalli Venkata Siva Rao =

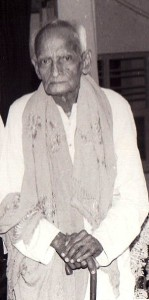
- Born: 14 February 1898; Kakinada, Madras Presidency, British India (Now Andhra Pradesh, India)
- Died: 3 October 1992 (aged 94); Bhopal, Madhya Pradesh, India
- Occupation: Lawyer
- Spouse: Kamala
- Relatives: Venkataratnam, Suryamanikyamba
- Writing career
- Period: 1898–1992

Digavalli Venkata Siva Rao (IAST: Digavalli Vēnkaṭaśivarāvu; 14 February 1898, Kakinada, Madras Presidency, British India - 3 October 1992, Bhopal, Madhya Pradesh, India), or Digavalli Śivarāvu, was a lawyer, historian and Telugu writer from Vijayawada, Andhra Pradesh. He is the author of forty-two books and some 300 articles written between 1924 and 1987. Some of his works are available in the Indian Digital Library.

He actively engaged with the Indian Independence Movement led by Gandhi. Siva Rao's analyses and critiques of British colonial rule drew the attention of the rulers—some of his books and pamphlets were proscribed, and he was accused and tried for sedition in the 1930s. As a volunteer for the Indian National Congress, he was in charge of publicity for Krishna District. He offered his legal services to many Congress volunteers who were arrested during the Salt Satyagraha. After Independence, he served on various government committees for the Telugu language.

Siva Rao was active in the literary, cultural and intellectual scene of Andhra Pradesh and formed friendships with many of his contemporaries like Veluri Sivarama Sastry, Basavaraju Apparao, Viswanadha Satyanarayana, N. Gopi, and Narla Venkateswara Rao.

Siva Rao was honoured by the Andhra Pradesh Government in 1966. The Andhra Pradesh History Congress honoured him twice.

== Family background and education ==
Digavalli Venkata Siva Rao was born on 14 February 1898 to Venkataratnam and Suryamanikyamba in Kakinada, a town in what was then the British-occupation authority administered Madras Presidency. His grandfather, Digavalli Timmarazu (1794-1856), was the English Record Keeper from 1828 at the District Collector’s Office in Kakinada. He was also the Court of Wards Manager for Pithapuram estate and rose to the position of Huzur Serishtadar in 1850, which was the highest office a native officer was permitted by the East India Company to occupy. His administrative decisions were recorded in the Godavary District Manual. Siva Rao’s grandfather also constructed the Sri Bhimeswaraswami Temple at Kakinada in 1828.

Siva Rao lost his father at a very early age and lived with his sister, Seetha Bai, and brother-in-law, Boddapati Purnayya. He studied at Calicut and Bangalore before joining, from 1910 to 1916 in Rajahmundry, the Hithakarini School which was founded by Kandukuri Veeresalingam (on whom Siva Rao was to later write a book). Thereafter, he studied intermediate (F. A.) and B. A. in Madras Presidency College from 1916-1920 and obtained a B. L. degree (1920-1922) from Madras Law College. Some of the students studying in various other faculties who were his hostel-mates during his time in Madras stayed in touch with him and would also become famous: M. Bhaktavatsalam, Avinashilingam Chettiar, Adavi Baapiraju, Koka Subba Rao, Yellapragada Subbarow, Velidandla Hanumantha Rao, and Kanuri Lakshmana Rao, to mention a few.

== Early literary activity ==
Rajahmundry was a vibrant literary hub. Siva Rao’s literary talents were recognized early in the literary meetings he attended (along with Adavi Baapiraju) which were presided over by writers including Kandukuri Veeresalingam, Chilakamarti Lakshmi Narasimham and Chilukuri Veerabhadrarao.

During his Presidency College days in Madras, he won a Silver Medal in 1918 for his essay "Loyalty". He also received the Bourdillon Prize (including a cash reward of twenty rupees) of Presidency College for 1919-20. In 1922, he received the Powell and Morehead Prize (including a cash reward of 120 rupees) instituted by the College for his essay "Pothana-Vemanala Yugamu". He ran a handwritten-magazine called Andhra Vani during his Presidency College days.

== Professional, political and literary work ==
1922-1930: After he receiving his law degree in March 1922, Siva Rao set up a legal practice in Vijayawada while continuing his literary work. He made a special arrangement with the local Ramamohan Library to receive consignments of books from the Connemara Public Library in Madras. His publications began in 1927 with Pothana-Vemanala Yugamu. His historical study in Telugu, Dakshinafrika (South Africa, 1929) was dedicated to Gandhi, who knew no Telugu. The latter wrote to him agreeing, in principle, to the dedication, "provided you do not state anywhere that the dedication is with my permission".

== Contribution to the Freedom Movement ==
Siva Rao contributed to the Indian Independence Movement as a writer and historian, as well as professionally as a lawyer. He became a Congress volunteer. He translated into Telugu several Congress circulars from the leadership. He also devised formats to collect information on the prevailing economic conditions in villages. Volunteers collected this information on their visits and gave it to Siva Rao who compiled and analyzed the information. These analyses were then published in the Congress’ periodic bulletins.

In 1933, he published Sahakara Vastu Nilayamu (Cooperative Stores), Bharatdesa Stithigatulu (Comparative Statistics in India), and Adhinivesha Swarajyamu (Dominion Status). The latter was widely acclaimed. These, and his other books written during this time, were intended to educate the public and Congress workers on political, economic and Constitutional matters.

He was in charge of publicity for the Congress division of West Krishna District, and wrote many pamphlets, booklets and books, some of which he published on his own, while some were published by the District Congress. His analyses and critiques irked the British-occupation's "government", and some of his books and booklets were proscribed. Police searched his house and seized copies of Satyagraha Charitra, Nirbhagya Bharatamu, Satyagraha Vijayamu, Daridra Narayaneeyamu, and Satyagraha Bhumi.

A sedition case was filed against him in 1930, which he contested and won on the grounds that there was no permission from the Governor in Council for his arrest. During the trial of his case, the circle inspector deposed in the court that Siva Rao was present in the Congress office whenever he went to arrest Congressmen and that he rendered legal advice for them and appeared as amicus curiae when they were produced in court. The second case against Siva Rao was filed in 1931 but was later withdrawn under the Gandhi-Irwin pact. He offered his legal services to many Congress volunteers who were arrested during the Salt Satyagraha and produced in court. Some of them were the Gampalagudem Zamindar Kotagiri Venkata Krishna Rao, N. G. Ranga, and Velidandla Hanumantha Rao.

He compiled Congress activities in the Madras Province and sent the information for a chapter in the book The rise and growth of the Congress in India (1938) by C. F. Andrews and Girija Kanta Mookerjee. He condemned the police excesses during the civil disobedience movement and the questions raised by him were tabled in the Madras Legislative Assembly through his advocate friend from Mangalore, and Member of Legislative Council, U. C. Bhat.

Siva Rao also worked in the Cooperative Store movement during this period. He was Secretary for Krishna Cooperative Stores and also Director of Andhra Cooperative Institute. He translated into Telugu the bye-laws and rules of Cooperative Society for Andhra and Gujarat which were printed and circulated. Siva Rao was also the President of Bar Association in the year 1947.

Two of his books during that period were English-Telugu Technical and Scientific Dictionary (1934). It was approved by the Government's Textbook Committee. Three other well-noted books by him published during that period were British Rajyatantramu (1938), Enugula Veeraswamayya's Kasiyatra Charitra (1941), and Kadhalu-Gadhalu (in four parts, 1944–47). These four books were widely acclaimed.

His edition of the travelogue Kasiyatra Charitra (the first two editions appeared in 1838 and 1860) involved considerable research and annotation of the archaic language of the original. For this, he went to the Oriental Manuscripts Library in Madras and studied the first two editions. His edition also incorporated a route map of the journey from Madras to Kasi. Hence he was given copyright to the work.

While most of his writings were in Telugu, a few articles were also published in English during this period - Christianization of India (1940), and The Hindu Moslem Civilization of India (1941) were published in the bilingual magazine Amrutavani ("The Immortal Message").

Siva Rao was also instrumental in helping other writers to publish. He was closely associated with the Satavadhani Veluri Sivarama Sastry from the early 1920s. The poet had been unable to get his books published. In 1940, Siva Rao had the poet's Ekavali printed. Similarly, Basavaraju Apparao's book Apparao Geyalu was published posthumously at the instance of Siva Rao.

== Writings 1950-1987 ==
Siva Rao's essays appeared in numerous (mostly Telugu) magazines. Prajamitra, Korada, Amrita Sandesham, Samadarsini, Grandhalaya Saraswamu, Vasumathi, Prabhatamu, Matrubhumi, Vijayavani, Jaminrytu, Samalochana, and Andhra Law Journal are some of the magazines which published his articles. He often also wrote for the popular daily newspapers: Andhra Patrika, Andhra Prabha, Andhra Jyothi, Andhra Bhumi, and Visalandhra.

Ayyadevara Kaleswara Rao, a senior Congressman and Speaker of Andhra Pradesh Legislative Assembly (1956–62) was an admirer and nominated Siva Rao as a member to many committees which he constituted and chaired during his tenure as Speaker—the Glossary Committee, Editorial Committee, Translation Committee, etc. After Kaleswara Rao's death in 1962, all those committees continued under P. V. Narasimha Rao who was the state's Education Minister. Under his chairmanship, the Andhra Pradesh Sahitya Akademi formed a three-member committee for microfilming of manuscripts with Siva Rao as a member.

But soon Siva Rao resigned, first from Translation Committee protesting impositions of Hindi terms into Telugu. Later on he resigned from the remaining committees as well. Meanwhile, between 1983 (when he turned 85) until 1987, he published 55 articles.

== Research material for scholars ==
Siva Rao had a considerable collection of documents as source material. Researchers who benefitted from the material included Kothapalli Veerabhadra Rao, Akkiraju Ramapathi Rao, Y. Vithal Rao, Bandi Gopal Reddy (Bangorey). Andhra Pradesh archives sent emissaries to Siva Rao to collect a few rare documents, some of which were on palm leaves.

Several books have been dedicated to Siva Rao. Kavisamrat Dr. Viswanadha Satynarayana dedicated his novel Pralayanayadu (1960) which he wrote based on Siva Rao's study of the First War of Indian Independence, 1857 Poorvarangamulu. The historian Bangorey dedicated his book Brown Jabulu (1973) and Thatachari Kadhalu (1975) to Siva Rao. Others who dedicated their books to Siva Rao were N. Gopi and Akkiraju Ramapathi Rao. His last book, Veeresalingam Velugu Needalu (Veeresalingam: Light and Shadows, 1985), was a critical biography of the social reformer Kandukuri Veeresalingam, published when Siva Rao was 87 years old.

== Selected works ==
Adimanavasula Yudhamulu (1958).

1857 Poorva Rangamulu (1957) (1965).

Sanyasula Swatantra Samaramulu (1962)

Mana Andhratvamu (1962).

Praja Prabhutvamu (1966).

Mana Police Vyavstha (1966).

The Rule of Law and the Bezwada Bar (1975).

Visalndhramu-Vismrutandhramu (1980).

Veeresalingam Velugu Needalu (1985).
