= Gullapudi, NTR district =

Village in NTR district, Andhra Pradesh, India

Gullapudi
- Village
- Interactive map of Gullapudi
- Location in Andhra Pradesh, India Gullapudi (India)
- Coordinates: 17.0529°N 80.5055°E
- Country: India
- State: Andhra Pradesh
- District: NTR
- Mandal: Gampalagudem

Government
  - Type: Gram Panchayat
  - Sarpanch: Potru Venkata Lakshmi

Area
  - Total: 5.43 km^{2} (2.10 sq mi)

Population (2011)
  - Total: 2,287
  - Density: 421/km^{2} (1,090/sq mi)

Languages
  - Official: Telugu
- Time zone: UTC+5:30 (IST)

Gullapudi is a village located in the Gampalagudem mandal, NTR district of the Indian state of Andhra Pradesh. It is under the administration of Tiruvuru revenue division.

== Demographics ==
According to 2011 census of India, in Gullapudi village, there are 613 households with a total population of 2,287, comprising 1,154 males and 1,133 females. The village has 789 Scheduled Castes members and 9 Scheduled Tribes members. Out of the total population, 1,205 individuals are literate and there are 1,278 workers in the village.
