= Putrela =

- Village
- Interactive map of Putrela
- Location in Andhra Pradesh, India
- Coordinates: 17.025554°N 80.716606°E
- Country: India
- State: Andhra Pradesh
- District: NTR
- Mandal: Vissannapeta

Area
  - Total: 24.15 km^{2} (9.32 sq mi)

Population (2011)
  - Total: 9,329
  - Density: 386.3/km^{2} (1,000/sq mi)

Languages
  - Official: Telugu
- Time zone: UTC+5:30 (IST)
- PIN: 521 227

Putrela is a village in NTR district of the Indian state of Andhra Pradesh. It is located in Vissannapet mandal of Tiruvuru revenue division. The village is famous for Hindu temple of Maremma Thalli.

== Demographics ==
As of 2011, Putrela has a total population of 9329, of which 4709 are male, 4620 are female, and 937 are below the age of 7. The average literacy rate is 67.45%.

== See also ==
- Villages in Vissannapet mandal
