= Arlapadu =

Village in Andhra Pradesh, India

- Village
- Interactive map of Arlapadu
- Location in Andhra Pradesh, India Arlapadu (India)
- Coordinates: 17.0348°N 80.4827°E
- Country: India
- State: Andhra Pradesh
- District: NTR
- Mandal: Gampalagudem

Government
  - Type: Gram Panchayat
  - Sarpanch: Kurakula Triveni

Area
  - Total: 11.66 km^{2} (4.50 sq mi)

Population (2011)
  - Total: 2,974
  - Density: 255.1/km^{2} (660.6/sq mi)

Languages
  - Official: Telugu
- Time zone: UTC+5:30 (IST)

Arlapadu is a village located in the Gampalagudem mandal, NTR district of the Indian state of Andhra Pradesh. It is under the administration of Tiruvuru revenue division.

== Demographics ==
According to 2011 census of India, in Arlapadu village, there are a total of 801 households. The population is 2,974, with 1,481 males and 1,493 females. The Scheduled Castes population is 1,115, and Scheduled Tribes consist of 4 individuals. The literate population is 1,574, with 1,716 workers in the village.
