= Rajavaram =

Village in Gampalagudem mandal, Andhra Pradesh, India

- Village
- Interactive map of Rajavaram
- Location in Andhra Pradesh, India Rajavaram (India)
- Coordinates: 16.9665°N 80.4188°E
- Country: India
- State: Andhra Pradesh
- District: NTR
- Mandal: Gampalagudem

Government
  - Type: Gram Panchayat
  - Sarpanch: Chennupati Narasimha Rao

Area
  - Total: 3.33 km^{2} (1.29 sq mi)

Population (2011)
  - Total: 955
  - Density: 287/km^{2} (743/sq mi)

Languages
  - Official: Telugu
- Time zone: UTC+5:30 (IST)

Rajavaram is a village located in the Gampalagudem mandal, NTR district of the Indian state of Andhra Pradesh. It is under the administration of Tiruvuru revenue division.

== Demographics ==
According to 2011 census of India, there are 251 households with a total population of 955 individuals (488 males and 467 females. Scheduled Castes comprise 457 individuals, while Scheduled Tribes include 7 individuals. The literate population is 573. There are 534 workers in the village.
