= Meduru, NTR district =

Village in NTR district, Andhra Pradesh, India

Meduru
- Village
- Interactive map of Meduru
- Location in Andhra Pradesh, India Meduru (India)
- Coordinates: 16.9981°N 80.4957°E
- Country: India
- State: Andhra Pradesh
- District: NTR
- Mandal: Gampalagudem

Government
  - Type: Gram Panchayat
  - Sarpanch: Gundla Lakshmi

Area
  - Total: 9.42 km^{2} (3.64 sq mi)

Population (2011)
  - Total: 4,924
  - Density: 523/km^{2} (1,350/sq mi)

Languages
  - Official: Telugu
- Time zone: UTC+5:30 (IST)

Meduru is a village located in the Gampalagudem mandal, NTR district of the Indian state of Andhra Pradesh. It is under the administration of Tiruvuru revenue division.

== Demographics ==
According to the 2011 census of India, in Meduru there are 1,358 households with a total population of 4,924. The Scheduled Castes comprise 2,034 individuals, while Scheduled Tribes number 2. The village has 2,631 literate individuals and 2,818 workers. The male population is 2,516, and the female population is 2,408.
