= Kothapalle, NTR district =

Village in Gampalagudem mandal, Andhra Pradesh, India

Kothapalle
- Village
- Interactive map of Kothapalle
- Location in Andhra Pradesh, India Kothapalle (India)
- Coordinates: 16.9603°N 80.5184°E
- Country: India
- State: Andhra Pradesh
- District: NTR
- Mandal: Gampalagudem

Government
  - Type: Gram Panchayat
  - Sarpanch: N. Ogi Reddy

Area
  - Total: 4.31 km^{2} (1.66 sq mi)

Population (2011)
  - Total: 4,838
  - Density: 1,120/km^{2} (2,910/sq mi)

Languages
  - Official: Telugu
- Time zone: UTC+5:30 (IST)

Kothapalle is a village located in the Gampalagudem mandal, NTR district of the Indian state of Andhra Pradesh. It is under the administration of Tiruvuru revenue division.

== Demographics ==
According to 2011 census of India, in Kothapalle village, there are 1,378 households with a total population of 4,838 (2,423 males and 2,415 females). The village has 1,395 individuals belonging to Scheduled Castes and 69 individuals from Scheduled Tribes. Out of the total population, 2,285 people are literate and 2,867 are workers in the village.
