= Kudapa =

- Village
- Interactive map of Kudapa
- Location in Andhra Pradesh, India
- Coordinates: 16°53′41″N 80°41′30″E
- Country: India
- State: Andhra Pradesh
- District: NTR

Area
  - Total: 13.32 km^{2} (5.14 sq mi)

Population (2011)
  - Total: 2,785
  - Density: 209.1/km^{2} (541.5/sq mi)

Languages
  - Official: Telugu
- Time zone: UTC+5:30 (IST)
- PIN: 521 215
- Telephone code: 08659,08673
- Vehicle registration: AP 16

Kudapa is a village in NTR district of the Indian state of Andhra Pradesh. It is located in Reddigudem mandal.
