= Gosaveedu Shaik Hassan =

Indian musician (1928–2021)

- Born: 1 January 1928; Gosaveedu, Gampalagudem mandal, Krishna district, Andhra Pradesh, India
- Died: 23 June 2021 (aged 93)
- Occupation(s): Scholar, Nadaswaram player
- Years active: 1950–2021
- Known for: Asthana Vidwan at Sita Ramachandraswamy Temple, Bhadrachalam
- Notable work: Performances at Tyagaraja Aradhana festival
- Parent(s): Meera Saheb (father), Hasan Bee (mother)
- Awards: Padma Shri (2022)

Gosaveedu Shaik Hassan (1 January 1928 - 23 June 2021) was an accomplished scholar and player of the Nadaswaram, a traditional classical instrument popular in South India. He had served as the Asthana Vidwan (resident musician and scholar) in the Sita Ramachandraswamy Temple, Bhadrachalam from 1950 to 1993. He had also served at the Sri Lakshmi Narasimha Swamy Temple, Yadadri.

Gosaveedu Shaik Hassan was born on 1 January 1928 in Gosaveedu, Gampalagudem mandal, Krishna district, Andhra Pradesh as the last child of Meera Saheb and Hasan Bee. He started playing music at the age of eight. At the age of 14, the British authorities imprisoned him for chanting slogans against them. However, they liked his music and voice and released him from prison. He learned instrumental music at Chilakaluripet, Guntur district from renowned musician Sheik Chinna Moulana and vocal music from renowned singer M. Balamuralikrishna's father Mangalampalli Pattabhiramaiah. He had also played Nadaswaram at Venkateswara Temple at Tirupati.

In addition to training many students in music, he has performed for nearly seven decades continuously in the annual Tyagaraja Aradhana festival at Tiruvaiyaru in Thanjavur district of Tamil Nadu, the place where Tyagaraja attained Samadhi. The organisers of the festival honored him with a gold bracelet in 1962 and the Thyagaraja Paraskar Award in 2007.

Shaik Hassan died on 23 June 2021. Govt of India posthumously honored him by conferring the Padma Shri award in 2022.

== Recognition: Padma Shri ==
- In the year 2022, Govt of India conferred the Padma Shri award, the third highest award in the Padma series of awards, on Gosaveedu Shaik Hassan for his distinguished service in the field of art. The award is in recognition of his service as a "Nadaswaram Player and freedom fighter credited with performances spread over seven decades.".

== Other recognitions/awards ==
- Thyagaraja Puraskar Award (2007)

== See also ==
- Padma Shri Award recipients in the year 2022
