= Anumollanka =

Village in Andhra Pradesh, India

- Village
- Interactive map of Anumollanka
- Location in Andhra Pradesh, India Anumollanka (India)
- Coordinates: 16.9763°N 80.5433°E
- Country: India
- State: Andhra Pradesh
- District: NTR
- Mandal: Gampalagudem

Government
  - Type: Gram Panchayat
  - Sarpanch: Attunuri Deepthi

Area
  - Total: 9.83 km^{2} (3.80 sq mi)

Population (2011)
  - Total: 2,042
  - Density: 208/km^{2} (538/sq mi)

Languages
  - Official: Telugu
- Time zone: UTC+5:30 (IST)

Anumollanka is a village located in the Gampalagudem mandal, NTR district of the Indian state of Andhra Pradesh. It is under the administration of Tiruvuru revenue division.

== Demographics ==
According to 2011 census of India, in Anumollanka village, there are 610 households with a population of 2,042, including 1,038 males and 1,004 females. The village has 829 individuals belonging to Scheduled Castes, while there are no Scheduled Tribes reported. In terms of literacy, 1,257 people are literate. The workforce in the village consists of 1,248 individuals.
