= Kanumuru =

Village in Andhra Pradesh, India

- Village
- Interactive map of Kanumuru
- Location in Andhra Pradesh, India Kanumuru (India)
- Coordinates: 17.0008°N 80.5622°E
- Country: India
- State: Andhra Pradesh
- District: NTR
- Mandal: Gampalagudem

Government
  - Type: Gram Panchayat
  - Sarpanch: Manda Mareswaramma

Area
  - Total: 14.61 km^{2} (5.64 sq mi)

Population (2011)
  - Total: 3,677
  - Density: 251.7/km^{2} (651.8/sq mi)

Languages
  - Official: Telugu
- Time zone: UTC+5:30 (IST)

Kanumuru is a village located in the Gampalagudem mandal, NTR district of the Indian state of Andhra Pradesh. It is under the administration of Tiruvuru revenue division.

== Demographics ==
According to 2011 census of India, in Kanumuru village there are 1,027 households with population of 3,677, comprising 1,904 males and 1,773 females. There are 773 belonging to Scheduled Castes and 4 to Scheduled Tribes. Of the total population, 1,760 individuals are literate. There are 2,156 workers in the village.
