= Penugolanu =

Village in Andhra Pradesh, India

- Village
- Interactive map of Penugolanu
- Location in Andhra Pradesh, India Penugolanu (India)
- Coordinates: 16.9780°N 80.4372°E
- Country: India
- State: Andhra Pradesh
- District: NTR
- Mandal: Gampalagudem

Government
  - Type: Gram Panchayat
  - Sarpanch: Sangepu Lalitha

Area
  - Total: 23.42 km^{2} (9.04 sq mi)

Population (2011)
  - Total: 7,045
  - Density: 300.8/km^{2} (779.1/sq mi)

Languages
  - Official: Telugu
- Time zone: UTC+5:30 (IST)

Penugolanu is a village located in the Gampalagudem mandal, NTR district of the Indian state of Andhra Pradesh. It is under the administration of Tiruvuru revenue division.

== Demographics ==
According to 2011 census of India, Penugolanu village includes a total population of 7,045, with 1,988 households. The village 1,647 individuals belonging to Scheduled Castes, and 113 belonging to Scheduled Tribes. The literacy rate is 3,710, with 4,016 individuals engaged in work and 3,335 classified as illiterate.
