= Erman Güraçar =

Turkish footballer and manager

Personal information
- Date of birth: 24 August 1974 (age 52)
- Place of birth: Ankara, Turkey
- Height: 1.82 m (5 ft 11 1/2 in)
- Position: Fullback

Team information
- Current team: Karşıyaka (manager)

Senior career*
Years	Team	Apps	(Gls)
1994–1996	Soma Linyitspor	31	(3)
1996–1998	Denizlispor	51	(3)
1998–2000	Samsunspor	57	(2)
2000–2002	Beşiktaş J.K.	43	(0)
2002–2003	Trabzonspor	27	(0)
2003–2004	Bursaspor	24	(0)
2004–2005	Samsunspor	4	(0)
2005–2006	Gaziantepspor	16	(1)
2006	MKE Ankaragücü	7	(0)
2006–2007	Denizlispor	31	(0)
2007–2008	Kocaelispor	19	(0)
2008–2009	Manisaspor	27	(1)
2009–2012	Bucaspor	47	(1)
Total		384	(11)

International career
2003	Turkey A2	1	(0)

Managerial career
- 2012–2013: Bucaspor (sporting director)
- 2015–2016: Somaspor
- 2016: Ayvalıkgücü Belediyespor
- 2020: Halide Edip Adıvar
- 2020–2021: Kırıkkale Büyük Anadoluspor
- 2022–: Karşıyaka
- * Club domestic league appearances and goals

Erman Güraçar (born 24 August 1974) is a Turkish football coach and former player who is the manager of Karşıyaka.

== Career ==
Güraçar last played for Bucaspor in Turkey. He played as a left/right back and fullback. Standing at 182 cm (72 in), he wore the number 22 jersey.

Güraçar was called up 1 time for the Turkey national football team and 1 time for Turkey B national football team.

He has previously played for Kocaelispor, Samsunspor, Beşiktaş J.K., Trabzonspor, Bursaspor, Gaziantepspor, MKE Ankaragücü and Denizlispor.

== Honours ==
=== Club ===
Trabzonspor

- Turkish Cup: 2002–03
