= Rallabandi Kavitha Prasad =

Indian poet (1961–2015)

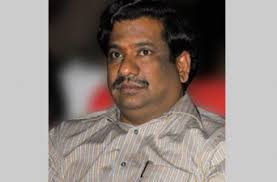
- Born: Rallabandi Venkateswara Prasada Raju; 1961; Nemali, Gampalagudem mandal, Krishna district, Andhra Pradesh, India
- Died: 15 March 2015
- Occupations: Director of the Department of Culture (United Andhra Pradesh, and Telangana)
- Parents: Rallabandi Ramakoteeswararaju (father); Rallabandi Ratnavardhanamma (mother)

Rallabandi Kavitha Prasad (born Rallabandi Venkateswara Prasada Raju) was an Indian poet and Avadhani. He performed over 500 'Avadhanams,' including satavadhanam (hundred-fold concentration) and dvisatavadhanam (two-hundred-fold concentration). He also wrote various sadhanas, such as navarasavadhanam (nine-fold concentration) and astadasavadhanam (eighteen-fold concentration). He received a Doctor of Philosophy from Osmania University for his research titled "Avadhana Vidya - Aaramba Vikaasaalu." He was known as "Avadhana RaaRaaju". He is survived by his wife Nagini Devi and sons Ramakoteswara Raju and Samvaran Kashyap.

== Early life and education ==
Rallabandi Kavitha Prasad was born in Nemali, Gampalagudem mandal of Krishna district (now NTR district) in Andhra Pradesh. He graduated from a college in Sattupalli and later received a B.Ed. from a college in Machilipatnam. He began his career as a teacher in private schools in the Bhadrachalam and Sarapaka areas. He later became a government teacher, where he worked to promote Telugu language and culture.

== Professional career ==
Rallabandi Kavitha Prasad joined the Indian Information Service and served as an Information Officer in Hyderabad. He then passed the Group-I services examination and became a deputy director in the Social Welfare Department. He later served as Regional Joint Director, Director of the Department of Culture in Andhra Pradesh, and an officer in the Tirumala-Tirupati Devasthanams in undivided Andhra Pradesh, and later in the newly formed Telangana.

== Promotion of Telugu language and literature ==
Prasad was known for his command of the Telugu language. He excelled in Avadhanam, performing Ashtavadhanam, Satavadhanam, and introducing Ashtadasa Avadhanam. He performed over 500 Avadhanams.

He was also an orator. In the presence of Dr. C. Narayana Reddy, he presented 300 extempore poems in the Kanda Padyam style and was given the title "Aasu Kavi Samrat" by Dr. Reddy. He organized the "Live in Poem" event at the Bhadrachalam temple.

He helped organize the fourth World Telugu Conference in Tirupati in 2012. His published works include "Dhwani", "Ontari Poolabutta", "Agni Hams", "Kaadambin", "Avadhana Vidy— Arambha Vikasal", "Padyamandapa", "Idi Kavisamayam" and "Saptagiridhama Srivenkateswara Swamy". He also authored "Avadhana Vidy Arambha Vikasal", "Padyamandapa", "Idi Kavisamaya", "Nooru teegala veena", "Sakti Upasan", "Dositlo Bhoomandala", "Satavadhana kavita prasada", and "Dwisatavadhana kavita prasada".

== Health issues and death ==
Prasad suffered a cardiac seizure about a month before his death. He was found to have blockages in three valves and was put on a ventilator. He experienced kidney failure and died of multiple organ failure at age 53.

Bureaucratic complications delayed the release of funds for his treatment, but then Chief Minister of Telangana, K Chandrashekar Rao, intervened. His family reportedly faced difficulties obtaining timely financial assistance.

== Legacy and recognition ==
Prasad was honored with an award for his literary achievements by State Governor ESL Narasimhan.
