= Peda Komira =

Village in NTR district, Andhra Pradesh, India

- Village
- Interactive map of Peda Komira
- Location in Andhra Pradesh, India Peda Komira (India)
- Coordinates: 16.9780°N 80.5036°E
- Country: India
- State: Andhra Pradesh
- District: NTR
- Mandal: Gampalagudem

Government
  - Type: Gram Panchayat
  - Sarpanch: Vemula Kasturi

Area
  - Total: 6.79 km^{2} (2.62 sq mi)

Population (2011)
  - Total: 2,881
  - Density: 424/km^{2} (1,100/sq mi)

Languages
  - Official: Telugu
- Time zone: UTC+5:30 (IST)

Peda Komira is a village located in the Gampalagudem mandal, NTR district of the Indian state of Andhra Pradesh. It is under the administration of Tiruvuru revenue division.

== Demographics ==
According to 2011 census of India, the population of the village is 2,881, with 1,442 males and 1,439 females. The child population is 298, consisting of 133 males and 165 females. Scheduled Castes constitute 1,074 individuals, with 531 males and 543 females, while Scheduled Tribes number 57, with 35 males and 22 females. The literate population is 1,844, with 1,013 males and 831 females, while the illiterate population is 1,037, comprising 429 males and 608 females. There are 1,379 workers in the village, with 792 males and 587 females, and 1,502 non-workers, including 650 males and 852 females.
