= Cheemalapadu =

Village in Andhra Pradesh, India

- Village
- Interactive map of Cheemalapadu
- Location in Andhra Pradesh, India Cheemalapadu (India)
- Coordinates: 16.8917°N 80.6498°E
- Country: India
- State: Andhra Pradesh
- District: NTR
- Mandal: A. Konduru

Government
  - Type: Gram Panchayat
  - Sarpanch: Morla Lakshmi

Area
  - Total: 44.76 km^{2} (17.28 sq mi)

Population (2011)
  - Total: 11,322
  - Density: 252.9/km^{2} (655.1/sq mi)

Languages
  - Official: Telugu
- Time zone: UTC+5:30 (IST)

Cheemalapadu is a village located in the A. Konduru mandal, NTR district of the Indian state of Andhra Pradesh. It is under the administration of Tiruvuru revenue division.

== Demographics ==
According to 2011 census of India, there are 2,875 households with a total population of 11,322 people. The population includes 5,953 males and 5,369 females. In terms of Scheduled Tribes, the village has a significant population of 3,360 and Scheduled Castes, however, have a smaller population of 1,717. A total of 5,723 people are literate, with 3,538 males and 2,185 females, while 5,599 people are illiterate. There are 5,885 workers in the village.
