= Vinagadapa =

Village in Andhra Pradesh, India

- Village
- Interactive map of Vinagadapa
- Location in Andhra Pradesh, India Vinagadapa (India)
- Coordinates: 16.9730°N 80.5308°E
- Country: India
- State: Andhra Pradesh
- District: NTR
- Mandal: Gampalagudem

Government
  - Type: Gram Panchayat
  - Sarpanch: Uma Devi

Area
  - Total: 19.84 km^{2} (7.66 sq mi)

Population (2011)
  - Total: 3,129
  - Density: 157.7/km^{2} (408.5/sq mi)

Languages
  - Official: Telugu
- Time zone: UTC+5:30 (IST)

Vinagadapa is a village located in the Gampalagudem mandal, NTR district of the Indian state of Andhra Pradesh. It is under the administration of Tiruvuru revenue division.

== Demographics ==
According to 2011 census of India, there are 913 households with a total population of 3,129 people. The population includes 1,583 males and 1,546 females. A total of 1,703 people are literate, with 1,004 males and 699 females, while 1,426 people are illiterate. There are 1,753 workers in the village.
