= Kunaparaju Parava =

- Village
- Interactive map of Kunaparaju Parava
- Location in Andhra Pradesh, India Kunaparaju Parava (India)
- Coordinates: 16°53′38″N 80°41′30″E
- Country: India
- State: Andhra Pradesh
- District: NTR
- Mandal: Reddigudem

Area
  - Total: 18.81 km^{2} (7.26 sq mi)

Population (2011)
  - Total: 5,370
  - Density: 285/km^{2} (739/sq mi)

Languages
  - Official: Telugu
- Time zone: UTC+5:30 (IST)

Kunaparaju Parava is a village in Reddigudem mandal in NTR district, Andhra Pradesh, India.
