= Pedda kadabur =

Pedda kadubur AJS
- village
- Interactive map of Pedda kadubur
- Location in Andhra Pradesh, India
- Coordinates: 15°45′57″N 77°19′32″E
- Country: India
- State: Andhra Pradesh
- District: Kurnool
- Talukas: Pedda kadabur

Languages
  - Official: Telugu
- Time zone: UTC+5:30 (IST)
- PIN: 518323
- Vehicle registration: AP

Pedda kadabur is a village and a Mandal in Kurnool district in the state of Andhra Pradesh in India.
