= Narikampadu =

Village in Andhra Pradesh, India

- Village
- Interactive map of Narikampadu
- Location in Andhra Pradesh, India Narikampadu (India)
- Coordinates: 16.9289°N 80.5935°E
- Country: India
- State: Andhra Pradesh
- District: NTR
- Mandal: Gampalagudem

Area
  - Total: 4.70 km^{2} (1.81 sq mi)

Population (2011)
  - Total: 320
  - Density: 68/km^{2} (180/sq mi)

Languages
  - Official: Telugu
- Time zone: UTC+5:30 (IST)

Narikampadu is a village located in the Gampalagudem mandal, NTR district of the Indian state of Andhra Pradesh. It is under the administration of Tiruvuru revenue division.

== Demographics ==
According to 2011 census of India, in Narikampadu, there are 80 households. The population is 320, with 152 males and 168 females. There are 27 people belong to Scheduled Tribes and no individuals belong to Scheduled Castes. Out of the population, 144 individuals are literate, while 176 are illiterate. There are 202 workers.
