= Vissannapeta mandal =

- Mandal
- Interactive Map Outlining Vissannapeta mandal
- Location in Andhra Pradesh, India
- Coordinates: 16.9398°N 80.7828°E
- Country: India
- State: Andhra Pradesh
- District: NTR
- Headquarters: Vissannapeta

Languages
  - Official: Telugu
- Time zone: UTC+5:30 (IST)
- PIN: 521215
- Vehicle registration: AP 16

Vissannapeta mandal is one of the 20 mandals in the NTR district of the Indian state of Andhra Pradesh.

== Villages and Towns ==
Settlements in Vissannapeta mandal includes

1. Chandrupatla
2. Kalagara
3. Kondaparva
4. Korlamanda
5. Narasapuram
6. Putrela
7. Tata Kuntla
8. Tella Devarapalle
9. Vemireddipalle
10. Vissannapeta
