= Yaru, Pakistan =

Human settlement in Pakistan

Coordinates: 30°30′20″N 66°57′30″E

Yaru is a town in Balochistan province, Pakistan.
