= Reddigudem =

- Village
- Interactive map of Reddigudem
- Location in Andhra Pradesh, India Reddigudem (India)
- Coordinates: 16°52′10″N 80°44′14″E
- Country: India
- State: Andhra Pradesh
- District: NTR
- Mandal: Reddigudem

Area
  - Total: 18.38 km^{2} (7.10 sq mi)
- Elevation: 101 m (331 ft)

Population (2011)
  - Total: 9,873
  - Density: 537.2/km^{2} (1,391/sq mi)

Languages
  - Official: Telugu
- Time zone: UTC+5:30 (IST)
- Vehicle registration: AP

Reddigudem is a village in NTR district of the Indian state of Andhra Pradesh. It is located in Reddigudem mandal.

== Demographics ==
As of 2011 Census of India, the town had a population of 9,873. The total population constitute, 5,146 males, 4,727 females and 961 children, in the age group of 0–6 years. The average literacy rate stands at 61.97% with 5,523 literates, significantly lower than the national average of 73.00%.
