= Lingala, NTR district =

Village in NTR district, Andhra Pradesh, India

Lingala
- Village
- Interactive map of Lingala
- Location in Andhra Pradesh, India Lingala (India)
- Coordinates: 17.0350°N 80.5166°E
- Country: India
- State: Andhra Pradesh
- District: NTR
- Mandal: Gampalagudem

Government
  - Type: Gram Panchayat
  - Sarpanch: K Veera Venugopal Reddy

Area
  - Total: 6.91 km^{2} (2.67 sq mi)

Population (2011)
  - Total: 3,088
  - Density: 447/km^{2} (1,160/sq mi)

Languages
  - Official: Telugu
- Time zone: UTC+5:30 (IST)

Lingala is a village located in the Gampalagudem mandal, NTR district of the Indian state of Andhra Pradesh. It is under the administration of Tiruvuru revenue division.

== Demographics ==
According to 2011 census of India, in Lingala village, there are 808 households with a total population of 3,088. Out of this population, 1,184 belong to Scheduled Castes, and 5 belong to Scheduled Tribes. The village has 1,413 literate individuals and 1,824 people engaged in various types of work. The gender distribution includes 1,623 males and 1,465 females.
