= Siva Rao =

Prime Minister of Sandur

Siva Rao (died 2 May 1840) was a member of the Ghorpade Dynasty who served as the ruler of Sandur from 1796 to 1817 and 1818 to 1840. In 1799, Siva Rao signed as treaty of Subsidiary Alliance with the East India Company.

== Reign ==
In 1796, the Raja of Sandur, Sidhoji Rao died at the age of thirteen. As he had died childless, the throne eventually passed on to Siva Rao, the son of Khande Rao, a distant relative of Sidhoji Rao. Siva Rao ascended the throne and in 1799, he signed a treaty of Subsidiary Alliance with the East India Company handing over the state's foreign affairs to the British and retaining internal autonomy. Sandur, thus, became a princely state associated with the Madras Presidency.

In 1815, tensions flared up between Siva Rao and the Peshwa Baji Rao II when the latter attempted to invade Sandur in the guise of making a pilgrimage to the shrine of Kumaraswami in the princely state. Siva Rao had the Peshwa's soldiers stopped at the passes and allowed Baji Rao II to proceed to Kumaraswami Temple only with a minimal retinue. Enraged, the Peshwa appealed to the East India Company to intervene as per the provisions of the Treaty of Bassein. The Company promptly sent an ultimatum to Siva Rao who delivered the state willingly. Siva Rao was in return granted the jaghire of Hirehallu and eight other villages. Sandur remained a British possession from 1815 till 1818, when they relented and returned Sandur to Siva Rao after the Peshwa turned hostile and fought the Third Anglo-Maratha War.
