= Pedda Gopathi =

Pedda Gopathi Gopathi Gopathi
- village
- Nickname: gopathi
- Country: India
- State: Telangana

Government
  - Type: DEMOCRATIC
  - Body: PANCHAYAT

Languages
  - Official: Telugu
- Time zone: UTC+5:30 (IST)
- Vehicle registration: TS 04

Pedda Gopathi is a village in India's Telangana state in the Khammam district. It is famous for Agriculture and was founded in 1857.2012-2013
