= Reddigudem mandal =

- Mandal
- Interactive Map Outlining Reddigudem mandal
- Location in Andhra Pradesh, India
- Coordinates: 16.8690°N 80.7367°E
- Country: India
- State: Andhra Pradesh
- District: NTR
- Headquarters: Reddigudem

Government
  - Body: Mandal Parishad

Area
  - Total: 89.73 km^{2} (34.64 sq mi)

Population (2011)
  - Total: 53,540
  - Density: 596.7/km^{2} (1,545/sq mi)

Languages
  - Official: Telugu
- Time zone: UTC+5:30 (IST)
- PIN: 521 XXX
- Vehicle registration: AP 16

Reddigudem mandal is one of the 20 mandals in the NTR district of the Indian state of Andhra Pradesh.

== Villages ==
1. Anneraopeta
2. Kudapa
3. Kunaparajuparva
4. Maddulaparva
5. Mutchinapalle
6. Naguluru
7. Narukullapadu
8. Patha Naguluru
9. Rangapuram
10. Reddigudem
11. Raghavapuram
12. Rudravaram
13. Seetharampuram
14. Srirampuram
