= Parava, Iran =

Parava پارو
- Village
- Location within Iran
- Coordinates: 26°45′13″N 54°50′38″E
- Country: Iran
- Province: Hormozgan
- County: Bandar Lengeh
- Bakhsh: Central
- Rural District: Howmeh

Population (2006)
  - Total: 17
- Time zone: UTC+3:30 (IRST)
  - Summer (DST): UTC+4:30 (IRDT)

Parava (Persian: پارو, also Romanized as Pāravā; also known as Yarū) is a village in Howmeh Rural District, in the Central District of Bandar Lengeh County, Hormozgan Province, Iran. At the 2006 census, its population was 17, in 4 families.
