= Kotagiri Venkata Krishna Rao =

Zamindar, freedom fighter and poet from Gampalagudem, India

- Born: 1890; Gampalagudem, Madras Presidency, British India (Now Andhra Pradesh, India)
- Other name: Gampalagudem Raja
- Known for: Zamindar, Freedom fighter
- Parent(s): Chinnayya and Subbayamma
- Awards: Kalaa Prapoorna by Andhra University in 1975

Kotagiri Venkata Krishna Rao (Telugu pronunciation: [koːʈaɡiriː ʋenkaʈa kriʂna ɾaʊ̯]), also known as Gampalagudem Raja, was a prominent Zamindar of Gampalagudem estate in the Krishna district (now NTR district) of Andhra region. He actively participated in the Indian independence movement during the 1920s, engaging in activities such as salt satyagraha and non-cooperation movements. Due to his involvement in these movements, he was frequently arrested and jailed.

== Early life and writing career ==
Venkata Krishna Rao, born in 1890 to Chinnayya and Subbayamma, belonged to the Padmanayaka clan and was raised in Nuzvid Estate. On the auspicious occasion of Phalguna Manha (twelfth month) Padyami (first day of the lunar month) of Khara Sanshavara (Telugu calendar 1891–1892), he was adopted by Jagannath Rao and Subbayamma. He was a prolific writer, with notable works such as Srinhaka Tilakamu, Yuvananigarhana, Chatu Padyamulum, Srikrishnarayanatakavali (a collection of four plays namely Abhinava Pandavyam, Padusha Parabhava, Bebbuli, Pranayadarsana), Matrudesa, Vidhi (Poetry), Devadasi (Drama), and Ghoshavyasa Khandanam, among others. The preface to his drama volume Sri Krishnaraya Natakavali was written by the acclaimed Viswanatha Satyanarayana. Madhunapantula Satyanarayana Sastry praised Kotagiri's ability to evoke both romance and virasa (heroism) in his earlier and later works, respectively.

== Congress politics ==
Krishna Rao was also involved in various political and social activities. He served as the President of West Krishna D. C. C. in 1921, donated Rs. 1,116 to Gandhi towards the Khadi fund in 1929, and was elected as the President of the Andhra Congress Committee in July 1931. He worked tirelessly towards the creation of a separate Andhra Province from the composite Madras State and was an advocate for the Library Movement.

== Struggle for Indian independence ==
=== Non-cooperation movement ===
He demonstrated his commitment to the Indian independence movement by resigning his membership from the legislature in response to Mahatma Gandhi's call for non-cooperation. Krishna Rao played a significant role during the special session of the Congress in Calcutta in September 1920. He, along with other Andhra leaders, supported Mahatma Gandhi's policy of boycotting elections. Rao actively participated in spreading the policy of Non-Cooperation, urging people to abstain from voting, persuading lawyers to give up their practice, and advocating for the boycott of British educational institutions. He later chaired a National Conference in Peddapuram and played a role in organizing the boycott of elections in various districts. His involvement continued during the Nagpur Congress, where the Congress adopted resolutions on Swaraj and Non-Cooperation. The Vijayawada session saw Rao's leadership in crucial decisions, such as raising funds for the Tilak Swaraj Fund and promoting the Khadi movement. The session also witnessed the design of the Congress National flag by Pingali Venkaiah. Rao's active participation extended to organizing Panchayats, promoting prohibition, and working towards Hindu-Muslim unity. The success of the session reflected the widespread support for the Non-Cooperation Movement in Andhra, with people, including leaders like T. Prakasam, responding enthusiastically. Rao's efforts contributed to the movement's success, leading to numerous individuals leaving their professions and studies to participate in the cause. The session marked a turning point in the creed of the Congress, emphasizing the goal of Swaraj achieved through legitimate and peaceful means.

In 1920, Krishna Rao played a pivotal role in Tanuku, West Godavari district, Andhra Pradesh, presiding over a crucial meeting of nearly 2000 people and fostering widespread support for the boycott of legislative elections as an integral part of Non-Cooperation movement. Rao, along with other Congress members, organized meetings to educate the public about the significance of boycotting elections, and these efforts led to the withdrawal of many filed nominations. Actively participating in the Non-Cooperation Movement, Krishna Rao was sentenced to one year of rigorous imprisonment for his involvement and was incarcerated in Cuddalore Jail from 29 September 1921.

=== Salt Satyagraha ===
Venkata Krishna Rao's involvement in the Salt Satyagraha was marked by his audacious defiance of the law. Leading a group of 120 volunteers from Vijayawada, he traveled on foot to Konaseema, where he and his team produced salt in contravention of British regulations. Campaign at Chinnapuram, which resulted in another year's rigorous imprisonment in Rajahmundry, Madras, and Vellore Jails from 30 April 1930.

Mahatma Gandhi, who was leading the independence movement, remarked that whether it was a landlord or a commoner, under British rule, they were living as slaves, and that Venkata Krishna Rao's actions gave a significant boost to the Salt Satyagraha in Coastal Andhra. Venkata Krishna Rao's participation in this act of civil disobedience was particularly noteworthy as his zamindari family was generally known to be pro-British, surprising many of his contemporaries.

== Awards ==
In addition to his contributions to the Indian independence movement, Venkata Krishna Rao's talents as a writer were also recognized. In 1975, he was awarded the "Kala Prapoorna" award by Andhra University for his literary achievements. This award is a testament to his impact not only as a political activist but also as a writer. Venkata Krishna Rao's life and legacy serve as an inspiration to those who seek to make a positive impact on their communities through both political and creative endeavors.
