= A. Konduru mandal =

Atlapragada Konduru mandal A. Konduru mandal
- Mandal
- Interactive map of Atlapragada Konduru mandal
- Location in Andhra Pradesh, India
- Coordinates: 16.9660°N 80.6521°E
- Country: India
- State: Andhra Pradesh
- District: NTR
- Headquarters: Atlapragada Konduru

Government
  - Body: Mandal Parishad

Languages
  - Official: Telugu
- Time zone: UTC+5:30 (IST)
- PIN: 521 XXX
- Vehicle registration: AP 16

Atlapragada Konduru mandal, commonly known as A. Konduru mandal, is one of the 20 mandals in the NTR district of the Indian state of Andhra Pradesh.

== Administration ==
A. Konduru mandal is one of the 4 mandals under Tiruvuru (SC) (Assembly constituency), which in turn represents Vijayawada (Lok Sabha constituency) of Andhra Pradesh.

== Towns and villages ==
As of 2011 census, the mandal has 13 villages. The settlements in the mandal are listed below:

1. A. Konduru
2. Atlapragada
3. Cheemalapadu
4. Gollamandala
5. Kambampadu
6. Koduru
7. Kummarakuntla
8. Marepalli
9. Polisettipadu
10. Repudi
11. Vallampatla
12. Gopalapuram
13. Ramachandrapuram

=== Hamlets ===
1. Komatikunta
2. Krishna Rao Palem
3. Deeplanagar
