= Damerla Rama Rao =

Indian artist (1897–1925)

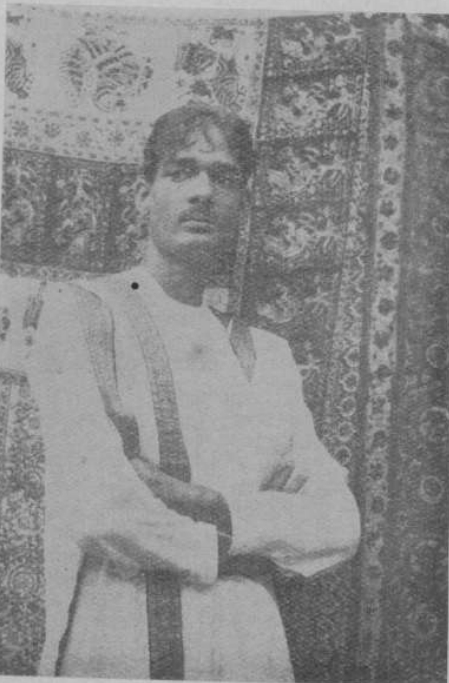
- Born: 8 March 1897; Rajahmundry, India
- Died: 6 February 1925 (aged 27)
- Known for: Painting, Sketching
- Notable work: "Godavari of Eastern Ghats", "Rushya Srunga Bhangam", "Turpu Kanumallo Godavari"
- Movement: Post-Impressionism
- Awards: Viceroy of India award

Damerla Rama Rao (8 March 1897, in Rajahmundry – 6 February 1925) was an Indian artist.

He was born to Physician Damerla Venkata Rama Rao and Lakshmi Devi as a second child in the group of five girls and four boys. Rao was married to Satya Vani in 1919. He was inclined towards the art of painting and sketching since childhood. Rao with his father went to Sisil N. Burns, who was the Dean of arts in Mumbai School of Arts in 1916. The sketches of an untrained, unexposed Rama Rao surprised and impressed the Dean which resulted in his admission directly into the third year of fine arts course.

His works were composed, decorative in nature and always compared to those of Puvs de Chavannes, the post-Impressionist artist of Paris. Rama Rao was spotted by Sir O. J. Couldrey, principal of the Government Arts College, Rajahmundry who took him to Ajanta and Ellora for sketching the frescos and sculptures. It is said that Viceroy Lord Reading was so impressed with Rama Rao’s works that he purchased the painting "Godavari of Eastern Ghats."

In 1923, Ramarao started rajahmundry chitra kalashala and trained many youngsters. His nude paintings were of a lady named nakula. He is one of the first artists to paint nude paintings of Indian women. Some of his world-renowned paintings like siddartha ragodayam, pushpaalankarana, kaartika pournami were exhibited and won prizes not only in Delhi, Mumbai, Calcutta as well as London and Toronto. His paintings can be still found at Damerla Art Gallery situated near the Godavari railway station.

He sent his paintings, Rushya Srunga Bhangam and Turpu Kanumallo Godavari to the exhibition organised by the Oriental Society. The Viceroy of India award was conferred to Rama Rao for his former painting and the latter was purchased by the then Viceroy of India Rufus Daniel Isaacs.

He travelled through various locations in the country and in 1922 settled in Rajahmundry. He instituted the Andhra Society of Indian Arts. He organised a national level art exhibition in Rajahmundry, the first time in the region.

He died on 6 February 1925.

== Memorials ==
Varada Venkata Rathnam established an art gallery in the name of Satya Vani, which was inaugurated by Durgabai Deshmukh in 1957.

Damerla Rama Rao Memorial Art Gallery is established in Rajahmundry. It contains many of his pieces that were found or donated.
