= Adivi Baapiraju =

Indian and Telugu novelist

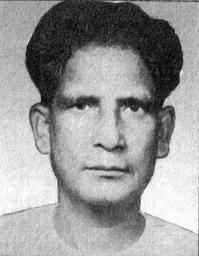
- Born: 8 October 1895; Bhimavaram in West Godavari, British India
- Died: Manipal, Karnataka, India
- Occupations: Novelist, playwright
- Years active: 1895–1952
- Family: See Adivi Family

Adivi Baapiraju (1895–1952) was an Indian polymath, who was a novelist in Telugu language, playwright, painter, art director, and anti-colonial nationalist known for his works in Telugu theater, and cinema. He is known for his literary works such as Gona Ganna Reddy, Narayana Rao, and Himabindu.

== Life ==
Baapiraju was born on 8 October 1895, at Sarepalle, near Bhimavaram in West Godavari district of Andhra. He obtained primary education in Bhimavaram and higher education at Narsapur and Rajamahendravaram. He visited tourist places around the country, such as Ajanta, Hampi, etc., and that is how his interest in arts and paintings developed. Inspired by the likes of Bipin Chandra Pal, Baapiraju participated in the Non-cooperation movement in 1921 and was jailed in 1922 for about a year. He remembered his experiences in jail in his book "tolakari". After his release Baapiraju attended the Law college in Madras. He practiced law in Bhimavaram for a year and later gave it up.

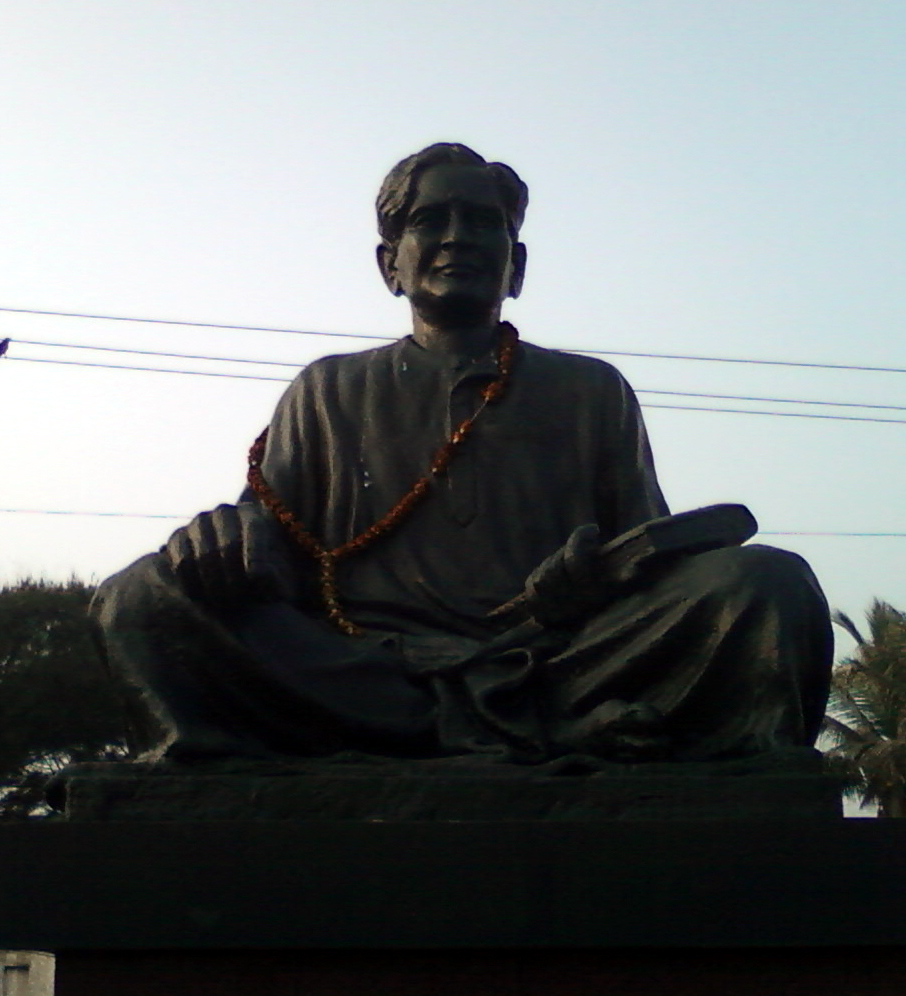
Adivi Baapiraju Statue at RK Beach Road, Visakhapatnam

Baapiraju served for a brief period as the principal of Jateeya Kalasala of Machilipatnam. In 1934 he gave up that job to enter the Telugu film industry as an art director. He directed Dhruva Vijayam, Meerabhai, and Anasuya. Baapiraju edited the Telugu daily Mijan, published from Hyderabad from 1943 to 1946. Baapiraju wrote over a hundred stories. He also provided paintings for Viswanatha Satyanarayana's Kinerasani Patalu and Nanduri's Enkipatalu. Baapiraju died in 1952.

== Works ==
=== As writer ===
- HimaBindu
- Gona Gannareddy
- Adivi Santisree
- Ansumathi
- Ottunga Srungam
- Narayana Rao
- Konangi
- Thoofanu
- Jajimalli
- Narudu
- Sailabala
- Bhogiraloya
- Veena
- Ragamalika
- Tarangini
- Nelathalli
- Anjali
- Narasanna Papayi
- Vadagallu
- Gaalivaana
- Rajakar
- Goduli
- Sasikala
- Tholakari

=== As painter ===
- Sasikala
- Sabdha Bramha
- Sundari Nandudu
- Bhagavatha Purushudu
- Suryadeva
- Samudragupta
- Mruthyunjaya
- Thikkana
- Paintings for 'Kinnerasani patalu' of Viswanatha Satyanarayana
