= Tiruvuru revenue division =

Revenue division in Andhra Pradesh, India

- Revenue division in NTR district
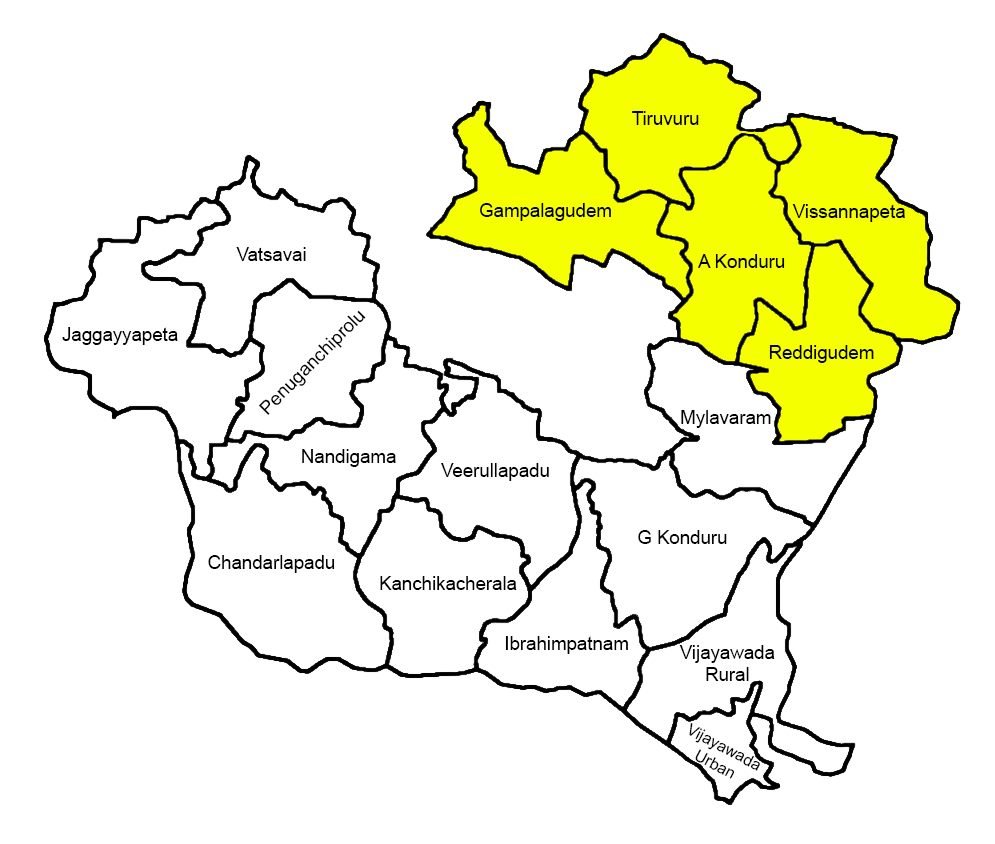
- Map of Tiruvuru revenue division in NTR district highlighted in yellow
- Country: India
- State: Andhra Pradesh
- District: NTR
- Formed: 4 April 2022
- Headquarters: Tiruvuru
- Time zone: UTC+05:30 (IST)

Tiruvuru revenue division is an administrative division in the NTR district of the Indian state of Andhra Pradesh. It is one of the 3 revenue divisions in the district with 5 mandals under its administration and is formed on 4 April 2022 as part of a reorganisation of districts in the state. Tiruvuru serves as the headquarters of the division.

== Mandalas ==
The mandalas in the division are

- Reddigudem mandal
- Tiruvuru mandal
- Vissannapeta mandal
- Gampalagudem mandal
- A. Konduru mandal
