= Wyra River =

Wyra
- Drainage basin of the Krishna in the South Indian Peninsula

Location
- Country: India
- State: Telangana, Andhra Pradesh
- Region: Southern Peninsular India

Physical characteristics
- Source: Near Wyra, Khammam district
  - location: Wyra Reservoir, Telangana, India
  - coordinates: 17.210009°N 80.376660°E
  - elevation: 27 m (89 ft)Geographic headwaters
- Mouth: Kesara, Krishna district, Andhra Pradesh
  - location: Munneru River, India
  - coordinates: 16.725134°N 80.318710°E
  - elevation: 0 m (0 ft)
- Length: 65 km (40 mi)approx.

The Wyra River is one of the tributaries of Munneru River, which is itself a major tributary of Krishna river. It originates at Wyra Reservoir near Wyra village, which was named after the reservoir.

== Origins ==
The river originates in Wyra reservoir at an elevation of 27 metres. It passes through Madhira. This rivulet drains into Munneru River after 65 kilometres of its journey.

== Wyra Reservoir ==
A reservoir was constructed across the lake Wyra in 1930 by Irrigation department of Andhra Pradesh and was inaugurated by Dr.Sarvepalli Radhakrishnan former President of India. It has a capacity of 3TMCs and can irrigate about 17,391 acres of land. The length of the dam is 1768.3 metres with 26 metres altitude at its foundation. There are 5 spillway gates for the dam. This lake was well known for fishing and sightseeing. Many industries were set up around this reservoir.
