= Bodepudi Venkateswara Rao =

Indian political leader

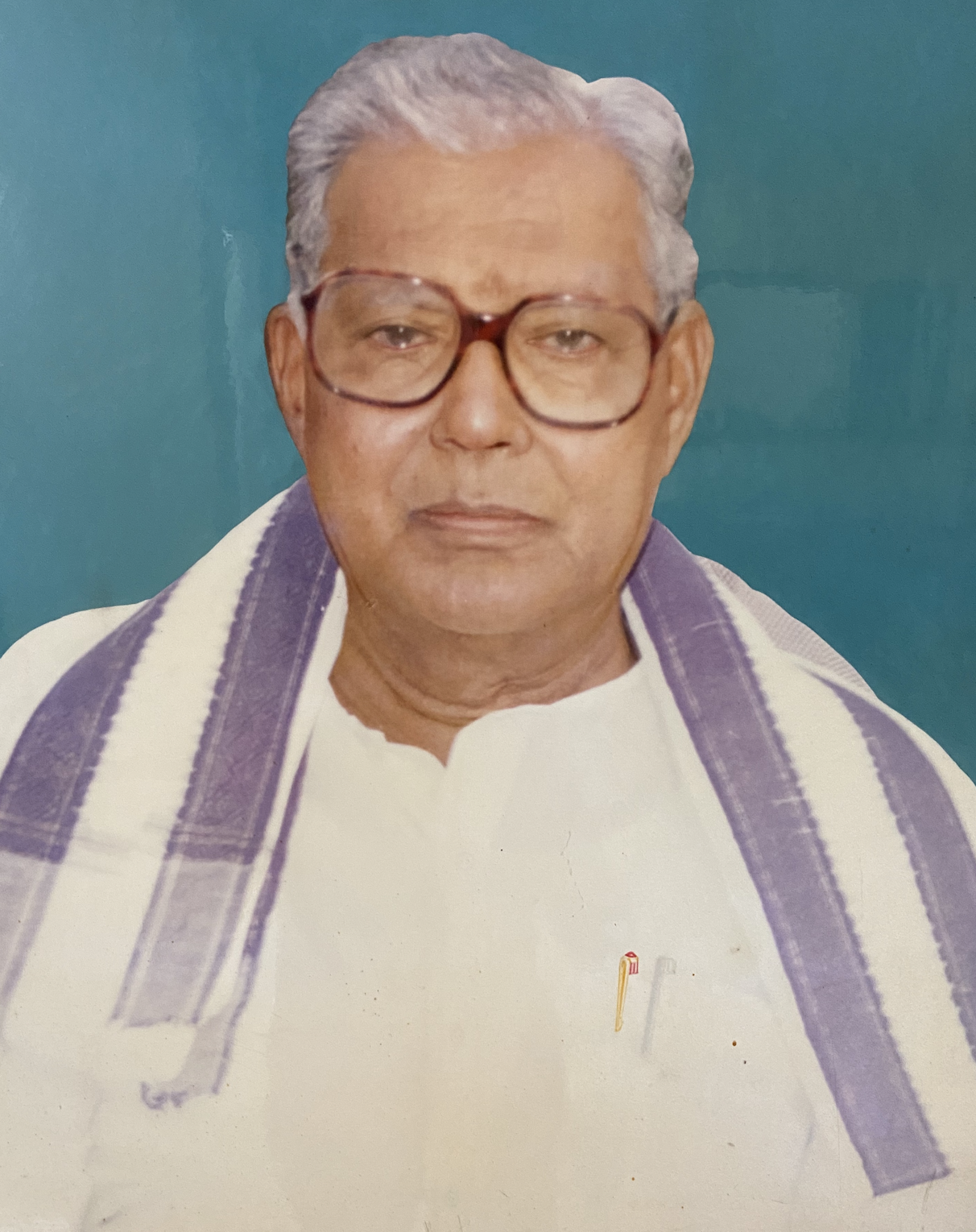

Member of the Andhra Pradesh Legislative Assembly
- In office 1985–1997
- Governor: Krishan Kant; Kumud Ben Joshi.
- Preceded by: Seelam Siddha Reddy
- Succeeded by: Katta Venkatanarasaiah
- Constituency: Madhira

Personal details
- Born: 2 April 1922 Thondala Gopavaram, Khammam, Andhra Pradesh British India
- Died: 5 August 1997 Khammam, Andhra Pradesh, India
- Party: Communist Party of India (Marxist)
- Spouse: Bodepudi Dhanalakshmi
- Children: Satyanarayana, Uma Devi, Seetakumari, Vasantha, Samrajyam
- Parent(s): Seethaiah Bodepudi, Subbamma Bodepudi

Bodepudi Venkateswara Rao (bodepudi venkateswara ˈraʊ; 2 April 1922 – 5 August 1997), was an Indian political leader. A member of the legislative assembly continuously for three terms serving the “Communist Party of India (Marxist)” [CPI(M)], Venkateswara Rao was previously a social reformer from the state of Telangana (erstwhile part of Andhra Pradesh). He gained a lot of prominence in the state and the country for his persistent efforts to improve the lives of the downtrodden. He won the hearts of millions of peasants and farmers from Khammam District, Telangana, India.

He became a member of the CPI(M) at the age of 13 and served the party loyally until his demise. His Telugu literary skills were commendable with an excellent command of the language. He came from a poor family and dedicated his life to improving the lives of farmers and rural areas. He played a major role in the Telangana Raithanga Samyudha Poratam (peasant rebellion) which led to the distribution of one million acres of agricultural land to poor farmers. He popularized the Ryotwari system (Kavula dhari chattam), and abolishment of bonded labor. He worked relentlessly in solving agricultural issues, bringing safe drinking water to hinterlands and enabling villages to be self-reliant.

He was a great orator and worked harmoniously with all the political parties for the welfare of the people of his constituency. He was greatly respected by leaders of all political parties.

== Early life and childhood ==
He was born in a village Thondala Gopavaram(pop: 4,902). He was born to Seethaiah Bodepudi, a farmer and Subbamma Bodepudi. He lost his father at a young age. His mother could not pay to maintain the 6 acres of farming land they had as she could not afford to pay the taxes. Bodepudi at the age of 12 sought the help from his paternal uncle but was rejected. Local people assisted him by offering him a meal and a source of livelihood. His source of livelihood involved selling salt and jaggery in and around nearby villages.

Bodepudi along with his mother and younger brother moved to his maternal uncle's village Gandagalapadu, Wyra Mandal. He then worked as a peasant on his uncle's farm for a meager wage and was financially responsible for his mother and brother. Bodepudi lost his younger brother at the age of 12 years.

He attended night school in Gandagalapadu where he completed his primary education. He worked as a school teacher for 2 years but was unable to meet the financial needs of his family on a teachers’ wage. He returned to work as a peasant for a feudal landlord. Until the age of 20 he survived on two sets of clothes (Dhoti and undershirt).

== Family ==
He married Dhanalaxmi Devabakthini against the will of his family. Dhanalaxmi's parents were migrants from Arikayalapadu (village of Enkuru). Both of Dhanalaxmi Devabakthi's brothers were killed by Razakars (police of Nizam) during the Telangana Rebellion. The couple had a son Satyanarayana and four daughters Uma Devi, Sitakumari, Vasantha, Samrajyam. Though his wife was bedridden due to illness after 15 years of their marriage, she fully supported him on his ideologies and principles which helped him to stay away from home for most part of his life. They shared a special bond until the very end.

== Political career ==
In 1939, Bodepudi was inspired by the then leaders Vasireddy Venkatapathy, Vattigonda Nageswararao and Patibandla Satyanarayana and was greatly attracted to the principles of Communist party of India (CPI). Though he was a peasant, he was motivated by the Movement of Andhra Maha Sabha and worked for the party during the nights. He acted as a courier carrying messages between Seshagiri Rao and other leaders in exile. In 1942, he joined Andhra Mahasabha at an official capacity and contributed to its success.

In 1944, he contributed to the major success of the meeting held by Ravi Nararayana Reddy, the founding member of Communist party of India (CPI). Bodepudi was the first person to hoist the Indian national flag in his village Gandagalapadu before independence was declared.

In 1945, he became a member of Madhira Taluka Communist party of India(CPI) and went into exile as the then Government of India had banned the party. He then actively participated in Bhuswamy Vyatireka Udymamam / Telangana Rebellion and Peasant Revolts.

On 15 August 1947, an arrest warrant was issued against Bodepudi Venkateswara Rao. He went into exile and lived in the village Nemali, Krishna District. Here he met the great leader Puchalapalli Sundarayya and was inspired by him. Later Bodepudi became the official political organiser for Madhira mandal.

During 1949, he marched with 20 farmers from his village and led hundreds of farmers who joined him on the way to Vijayawada for Akhila Bharata Kisan Maha Sabhaalu. (All India Kisan Sabha) This was mentioned as the biggest successful farmers march across India.

In 1952, during general elections, he worked relentlessly with Chirravuri Lakshmi Narasaiah, Kesavarao to nurture the Communist party of India (CPI) and made it very strong. He was elected as the member of Wyra Somavaram Panchayat.

From 1952 to 1955, he worked as an active member of Madhira Communist party of India (CPI).

In 1958, Bodepudi was elected as the district party member and later grew to state level and also was a key activist of Raitu Coolie Sangham.

In 1964, Communist party of India(CPI) split into two as (CPI) and Communist Party of India (Marxist) CPI(M), he chose CPI(M) and joined it as a district level party member.

On 29 December 1964, Bodepudi was arrested by the Government of India accusing him as a secret agent of China. He was imprisoned in Rajahmundry Jail, was later moved to Chanchalguda Jail in Hyderabad and was released in March 1969.

In 1974 he was arrested in the Railway Strike and imprisoned for 45 days in Warangal central Jail and Musheerabad Prison. Bodepudi Venkateswara Rao was arrested by the Government of India on 26, June 1975 during the emergency period and was held at Warangal central Jail until 1977. During this time he learnt to read, speak and write English.

In 1992, Bodepudi was elected as the president of Rastra Raithu Sanga Mahasabhalu in Madhira and in 1995, he was elected as the president of Rastra Raithu Sanga Mahasabhalu in Bhimavaram.

== Legislature career ==
Bodepudi contested but lost in the elections conducted in 1972, 1977, 1983 from Madhira Constituency as the member of Legislative Assembly.

Bodepudi contested from Madhira Constituency as the member of Legislative Assembly and won against Seelam Sidha Reddy continuously in the Legislative Assembly elections of the year 1985, 1989, 1994 AP Elections Commissions. Bodepudi represented / Led Communist Party of India (Marxist)” [CPI(M)] party in the Legislative Assembly of Andhra Pradesh from 1989 to 1997. Bodepudi was the CPI(M) State committee member in the State Assembly and President of Rythu Coolie Sangham State committee from 1977 to 1990.

Bodepudi served as CPI(M) State representative (Karyavarga Sabhyudu) from 1985 to 1989.

== Social reformer ==
He led the revolution against the Razakars and Feudal landlords and saw that 1938 acres of fertile land was distributed to the farmers of 24 villages in Andhra Pradesh. Fought against excess tax levied on the Nizam farming lands and got it relaxed.

He worked hard for the villagers of Madhira Taluka to obtain land sanctions for 1100 families.

He worked hard for the villagers of Madhira Taluka to obtain sanction of land for 1100 families. From 1965 to 1970's, he led the Marxist party movement and got the attention of the higher officials to get 23 acres of lands allotted to the backward caste villagers of Vithana vada village. He worked with Garidepalli Venkateswarlu and fought against bureaucracy at all levels of the government to stop the distribution of land to peasants and farmers Many peasants and farmers of Madhira Taluka were inspired by Bodepudi's leadership and looked up to him for the solutions to their problems. Bodepudi was always there for the farmers to understand their problems, he used to walk hundreds of miles with them on the fields to personally understand the depth of issues and discuss various options to resolve them.

Farmers from Yerrupalem mandal were suffering from drought and lack of irrigation facilities, Bodepudi made it his mission to facilitate supply of water to hundreds of acres of agricultural land and slowly got all 10,000 acres of land to receive water.

In Wyra Mandal, farmers lost crops due to lack of water as the lakes and canals dried up during the farming season. Bodepudi convinced the government and solved the irrigation issue by getting water from Nagarjuna Sagar Dam to flow to these mandals.

Wyra project water was not reaching the villages of Garikapadu, Gatapuram, Repalle Narayanapuram Bonakal, Brahmanapalli, he spent days with these farmers to find solutions and prepared a proposal to get Rs. 4 Crores world bank funding for infrastructure works. Bodepudi saw that Rs 20 Lakhs were funded for lift irrigation projects in Wyra mandalam, Punya puram, Gatapuram. All earthen roads of Yerrupalem mandal were replaced with tar roads. Lift Irrigation was introduced in Sirupuram raising new hopes for farmers. Got two bridges constructed in Wyra Mandalam by obtaining funds of Rs. 2 Crores. Wyra over bridge in Siripuram put an end to the hardships and loss of animals, homes and people during every monsoon. Bodepudi worked very hard to improve the living conditions of tribes of Bhadrachalam. Bodepudi contributed a lot to then Honorable Chief Minister Chandrababu Naidu’s Janmabhumi program, he educated the villagers on the importance of the program, self development of villages and self sustenance.

The Mustikonta village of Bonakal mandal under his supervision and led by its sarpanch Venkatanarayana made huge developments through the Janmabhumi program. It was mentioned as one of the top developed villages and received immense appreciation from then Honorable Chief Minister Chandrababu Naidu. Drinking water in the villages of Madhira Mandal had high content of fluoride that weakened bones and muscles and led to people suffering from various diseases. He made it his mission to bring safe drinking water to all homes of the 103 villages. He played a major role in getting Rs. 22,050 Crores sanctioned for safe drinking water project which he named as ‘Sujala Sravanthi’. It was his dream to get this inaugurated by then Honorable Chief minister Chandrababu Naidu but he died before it could happen.

Former Andhra Pradesh Chief Minister Chandrababu Naidu promised to continue many of the development activities initiated by Bodepudi and also named the safe drinking water project as Bodepudi Sujala Sravanthi.

== Gallery ==
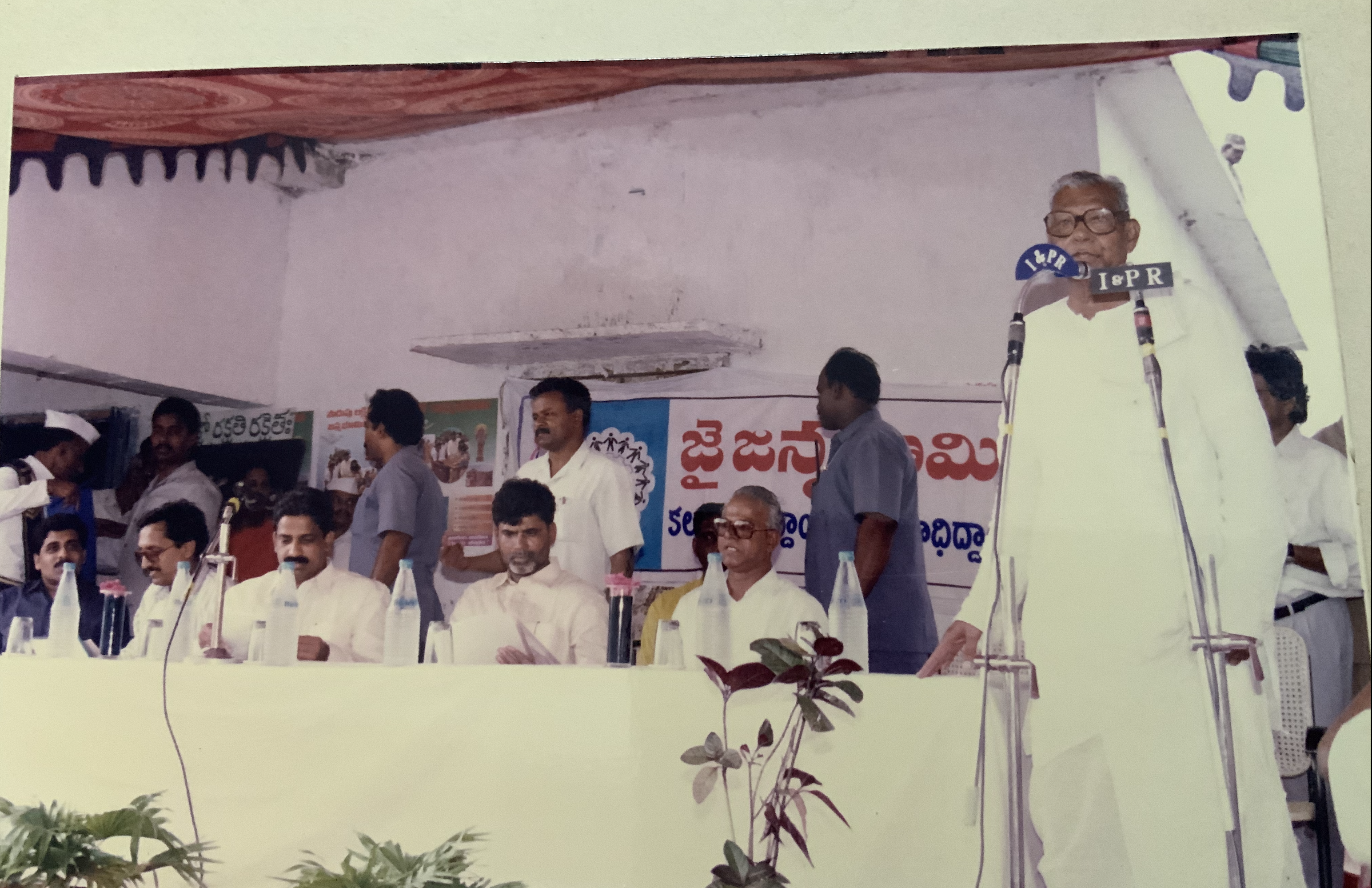
Bodepudi Addressing Jhanmabhumi Program

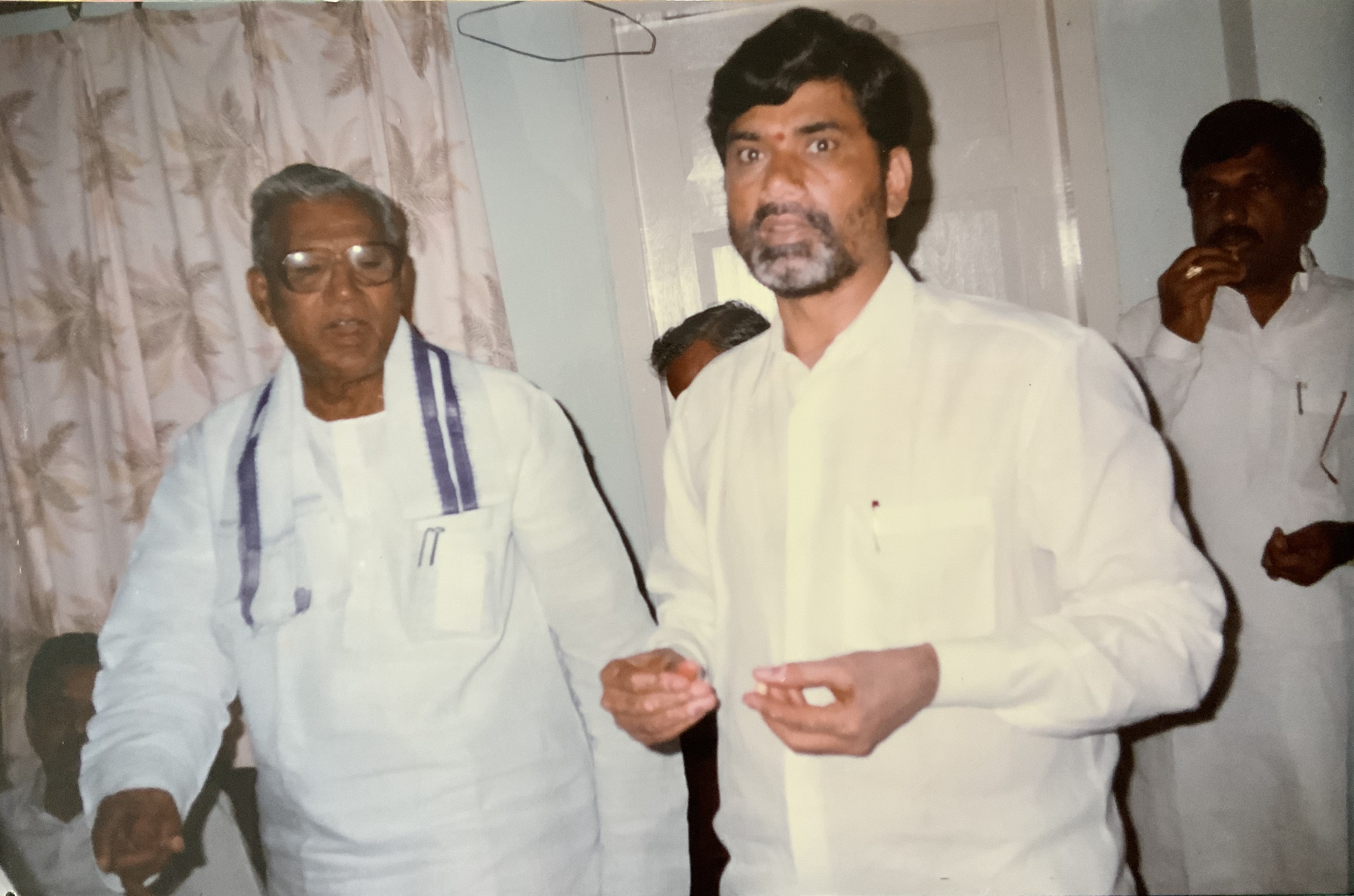
Bodepudi Venkateswara Rao with Chandrababu Naidu

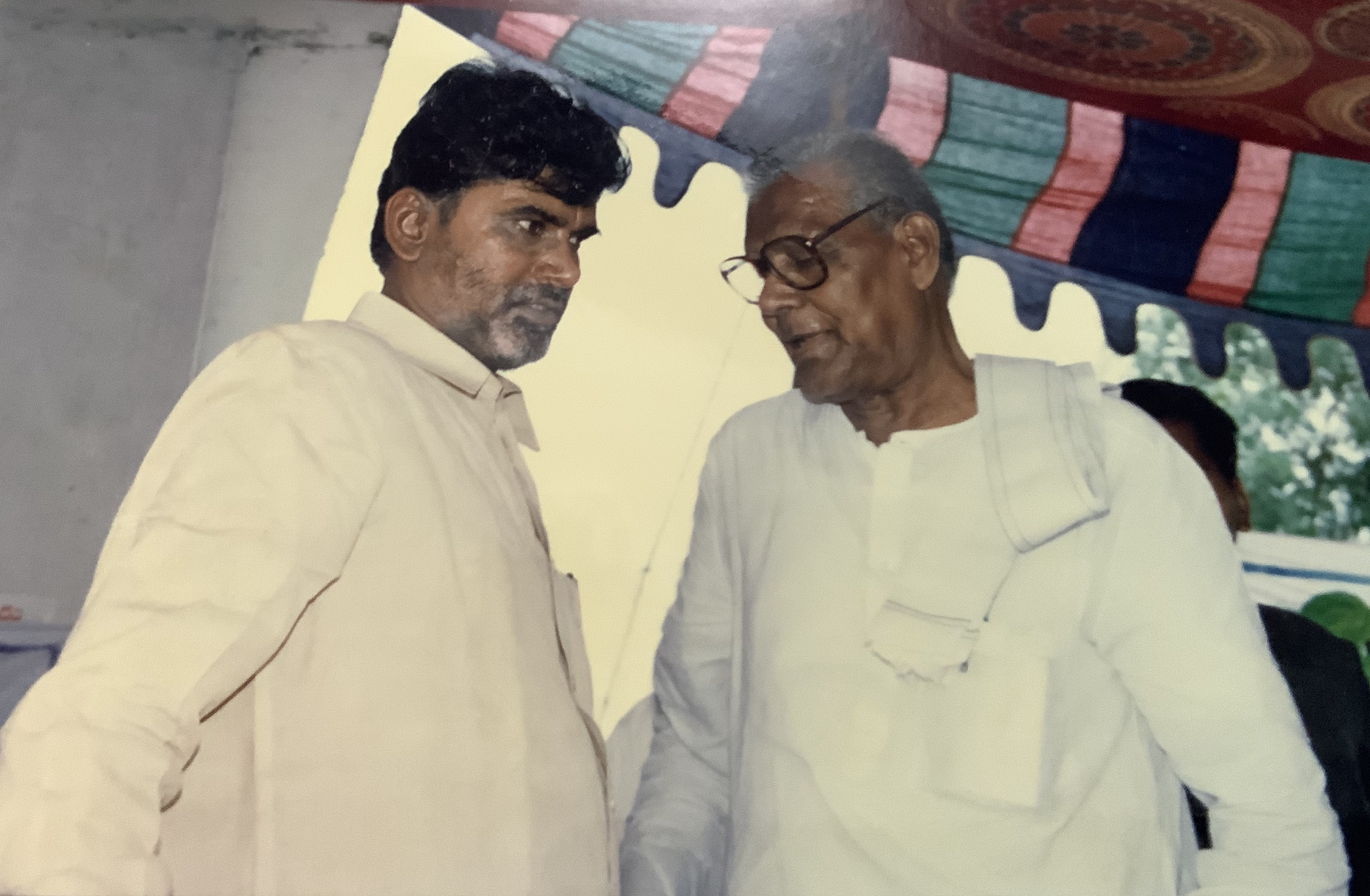
Bodepudi Venkateswara Rao with Chandrababu Naidu

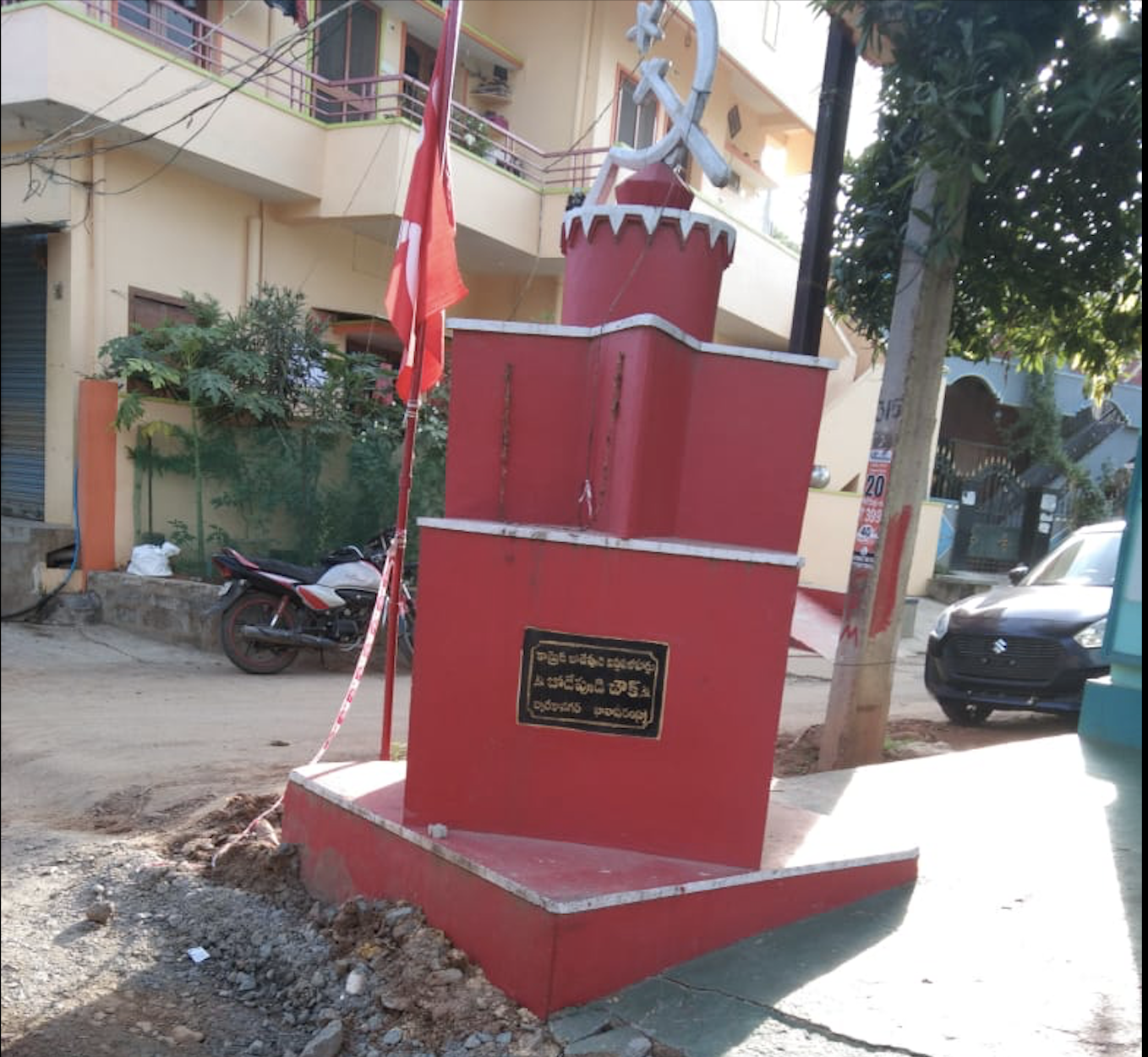
In memory of Bodepudi, Khammam Bank colony

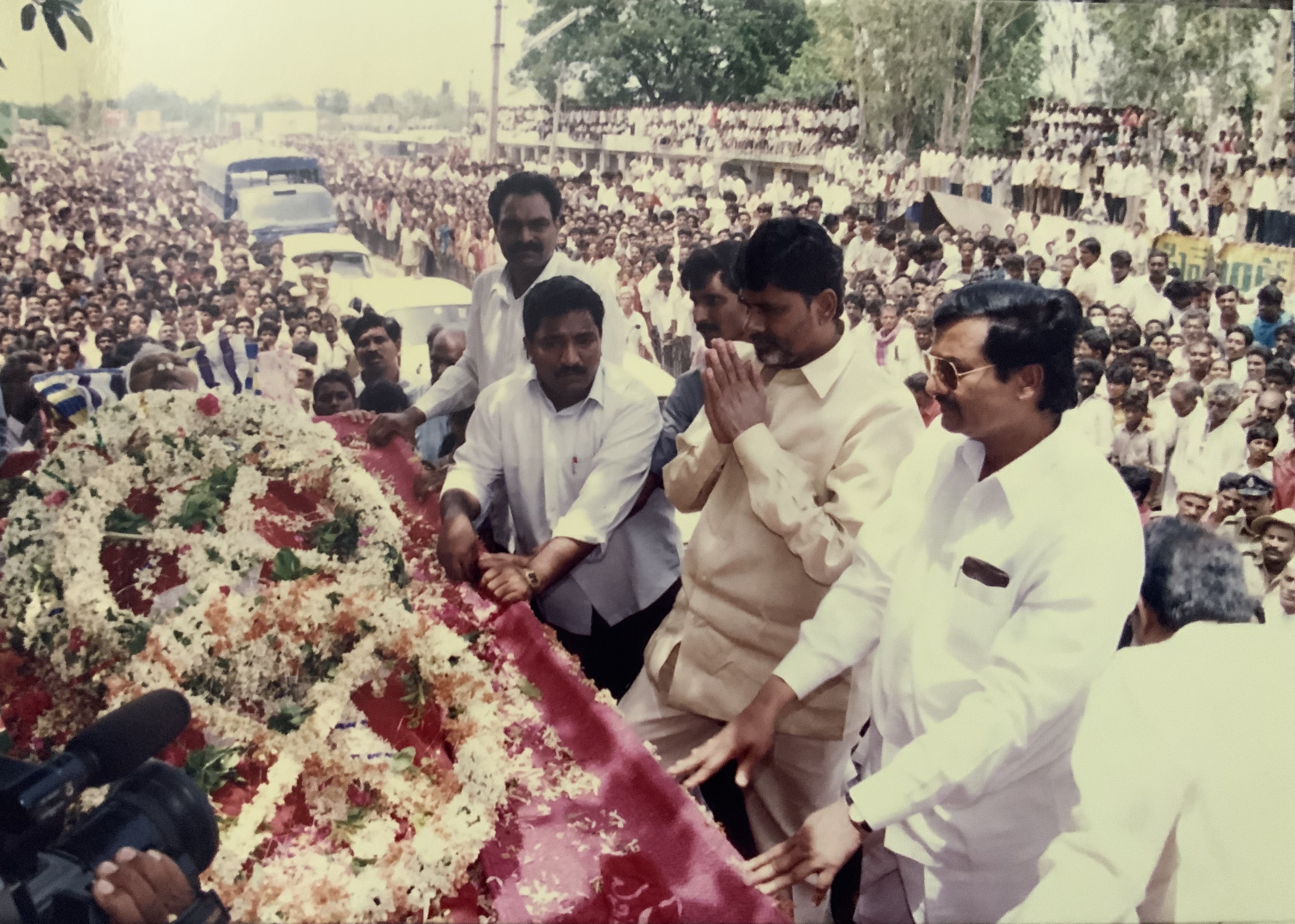
Chandra Babu Naidu and Madhava reddy on the demise of Bodepudi Venkateswara Rao

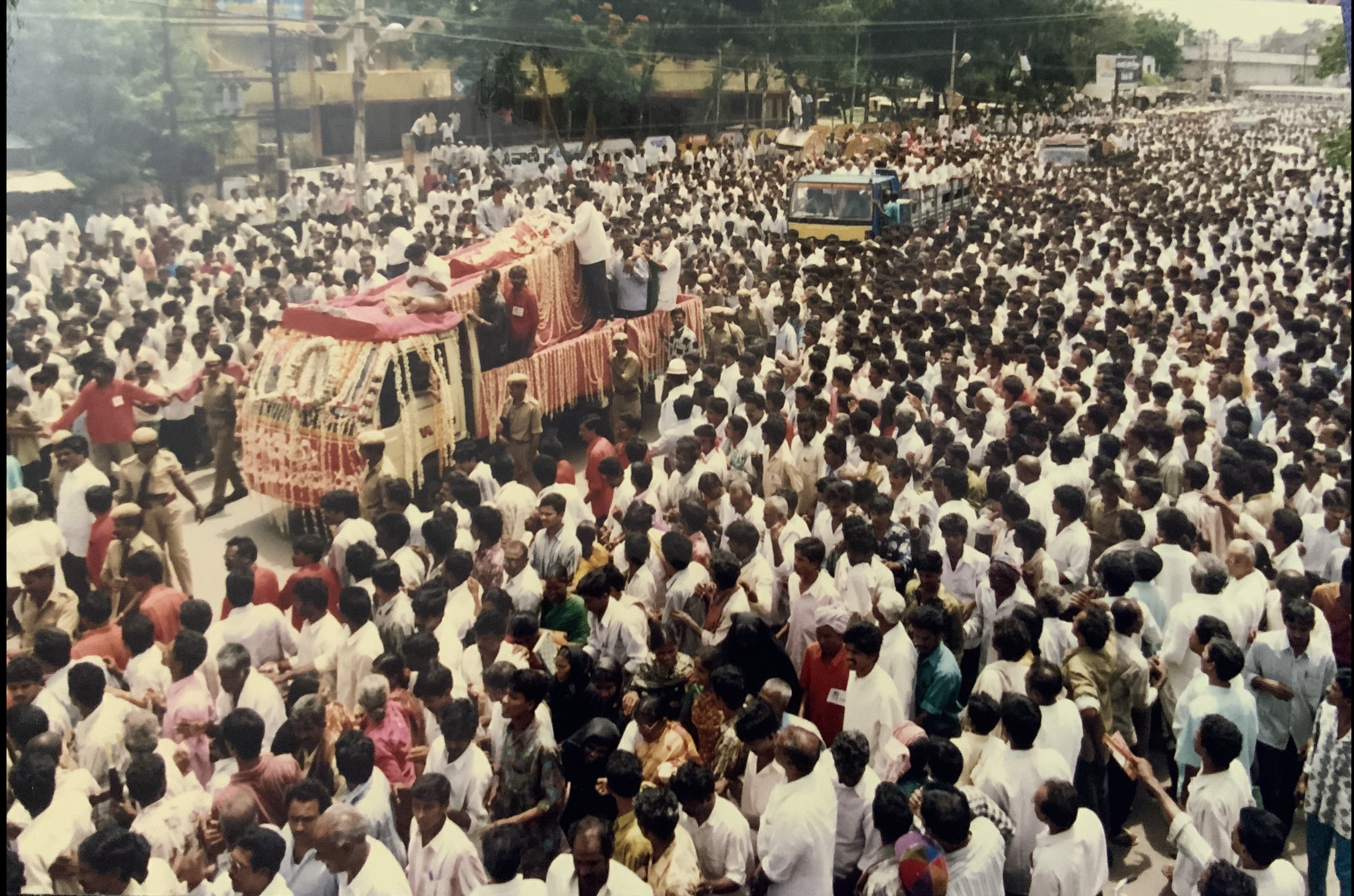
Bodepudi Demise
