= Somavaram =

Somavaram may refer to:

- Somavara, Sanskrit term for Monday
- Somavaram, Nandigama mandal, a village in Nandigama mandal of Krishna district, Andhra Pradesh
- Somavaram, Chatrai mandal, a village in Chatrai mandal of Krishna district, Andhra Pradesh
