= Muppalla, Chandarlapadu mandal =

Muppalla village Muppalla
- Village
- Interactive map of Muppalla village
- Location in Andhra Pradesh, India
- Coordinates: 16°41′10″N 80°12′32″E
- Country: India
- State: Andhra Pradesh
- District: NTR
- Founder: NGPC

Government
  - Type: Gram Panchayat
  - [[]]: ([[]])

Area
  - Total: 15.84 km^{2} (6.12 sq mi)

Population (2011)
  - Total: 5,877
  - Density: 371.0/km^{2} (960.9/sq mi)

Languages
  - Official: Telugu
- Time zone: UTC+5:30 (IST)
- Pincode: 521183
- Vehicle registration: AP–16

Muppalla is a village in NTR district of the Indian state of Andhra Pradesh. It is located in Chandarlapadu mandal of Vijayawada revenue division. Average population as of 2012 is 3,800.

== Geography ==
Muppalla is located 5 km south of Nandigama and 7 km north of Chandarlapadu
