= Katta Venkata Narasaiah =

Indian politician

Katta Venkata Narasaiah (1934 – 3 January 2021) was an Indian politician from Andhra Pradesh. He was a member of the Andhra Pradesh Legislative Assembly from the Madhira Assembly constituency in Khammam district representing the Communist Party of India (Marxist).

== Early life ==
Narasaiah is from Pocharam village, Kallur mandal, Andhra Pradesh.

== Career ==
Narasaiah won from the Madhira Assembly constituency in the 1998 byelection which was necessiated by the death of sitting MLA Bodepudi Venkateswara Rao. He lost the 1999 Andhra Pradesh Legislative Assembly election, also representing the Communist Party of India (Marxist) to Kondabala Koteswara Rao of the Telugu Desam Party. In 1999, he garnered 43,425 votes but lost by a margin of 5,001 votes. But he regained the Madhira seat for the CPI (M) winning the 2004 Andhra Pradesh Legislative Assembly election, this time beating Kondabala Koteswara Rao of the TDP. In 2004, he polled 71,405 votes and defeated his nearest rival and sitting MLA, Rao, by 21,433 votes.

He joined the Communist Party of India in 1975 and served the party as Division Secretary for 20 years. He left the part in 2009 due to ideological differences.

=== Death ===
Narasaiah died on 3 January 2021 at a private hospital in Hyderabad due to COVID-19 related complications.
