= Chintalapadu =

Chintalapadu may refer to:

- Chintalapadu, Chandarlapadu mandal, a village in Chandarlapadu mandal of Krishna district, India
- Chintalapadu, Tiruvuru mandal, a village in Tiruvuru mandal of Krishna district, India
