= Anasagaram =

- Village
- Interactive map of Anasagaram
- Location in Andhra Pradesh, India Anasagaram (India)
- Coordinates: 16°47′48.45″N 80°16′12.84″E
- Country: India
- State: Andhra Pradesh
- District: NTR

Population (2001)
  - Total: 1,464

Languages
  - Official: Telugu
- Time zone: UTC+5:30 (IST)
- PIN: 521185
- Vehicle registration: AP

Anasagaram is a village in the Krishna district of the southern Indian state of Andhra Pradesh. It is part of Nandigama mandal.
