= Munneru River =

River in India

Munneru is a left tributary of the Krishna River. It originates in Warangal District of Telangana, India and flows in the districts of Khammam District and NTR District. The river is named after Rishi Maudgalya, who is said to have created this river with his spiritual power and performed a penance ritual in Khammam.

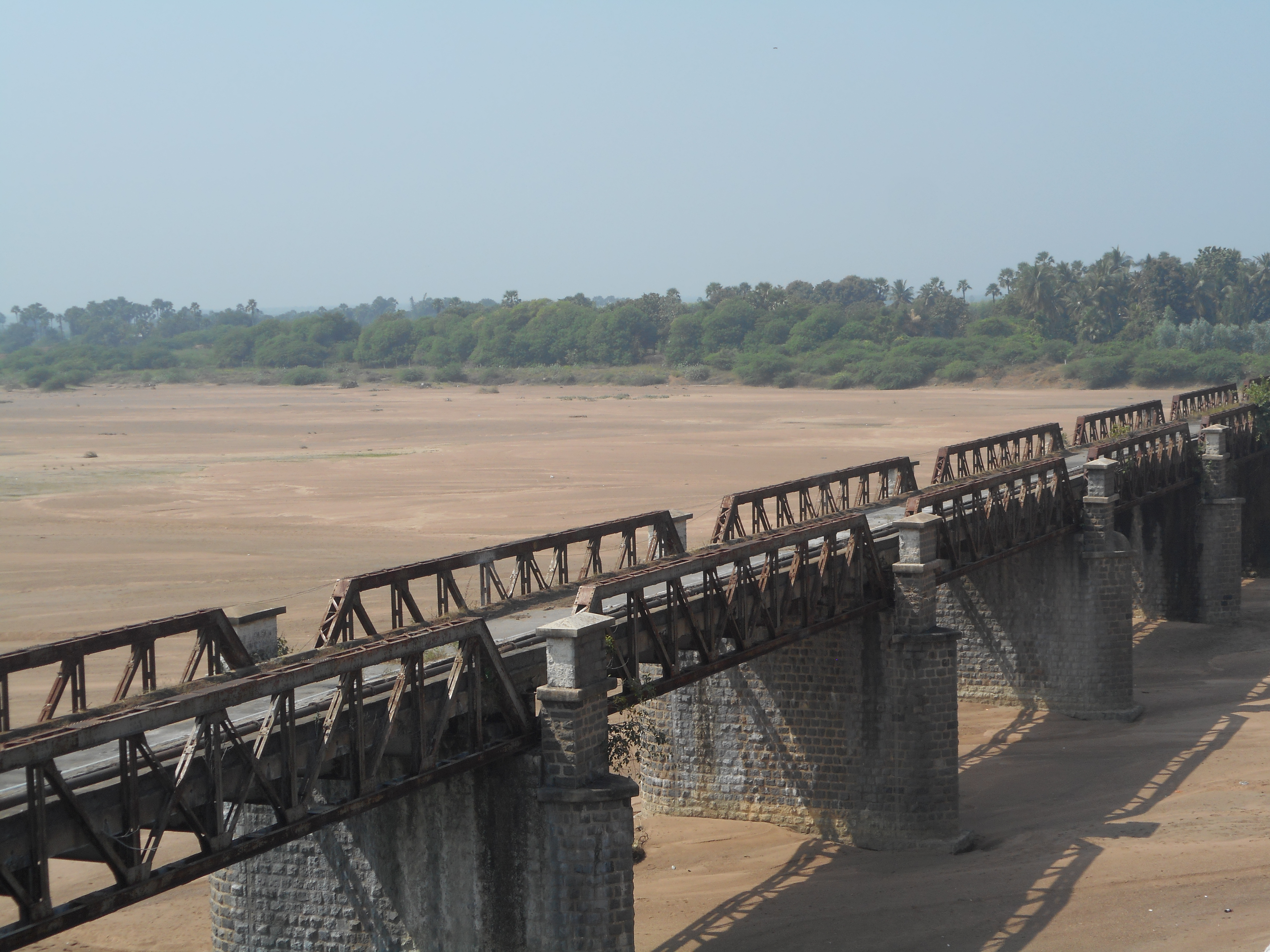
Sand dunes formed by Munneru River at Keesara village of NTR district

== Origins ==
It originates near Narsampet town of Warangal District, Telangana.

== Flow ==
It flows through Dornakal Eru and comes via Kamanchkal to Danavaigudam suburb of Khammam city where it has a small Dam in order to facilitate water collection. Munneru acts as a water source to Khammam city. It goes through ManchiKanti Nagar, Kalavoddu, Moti Nagar, Prakash Nagar and Dhamsalampuram suburbs of Khammam city. It reaches Pedamandava Telangana Border and Vatsavayi village of NTR District. It flows into Penuganchiprolu town, Keesara village and finally discharges into the Krishna river at Eturu village near Nandigama downstream of Pulichintala dam. Muniyeru barrage was constructed in the year 1898 near Jaggayyapeta to supply irrigation water to 6,650 hectares of land.

== Bridges ==
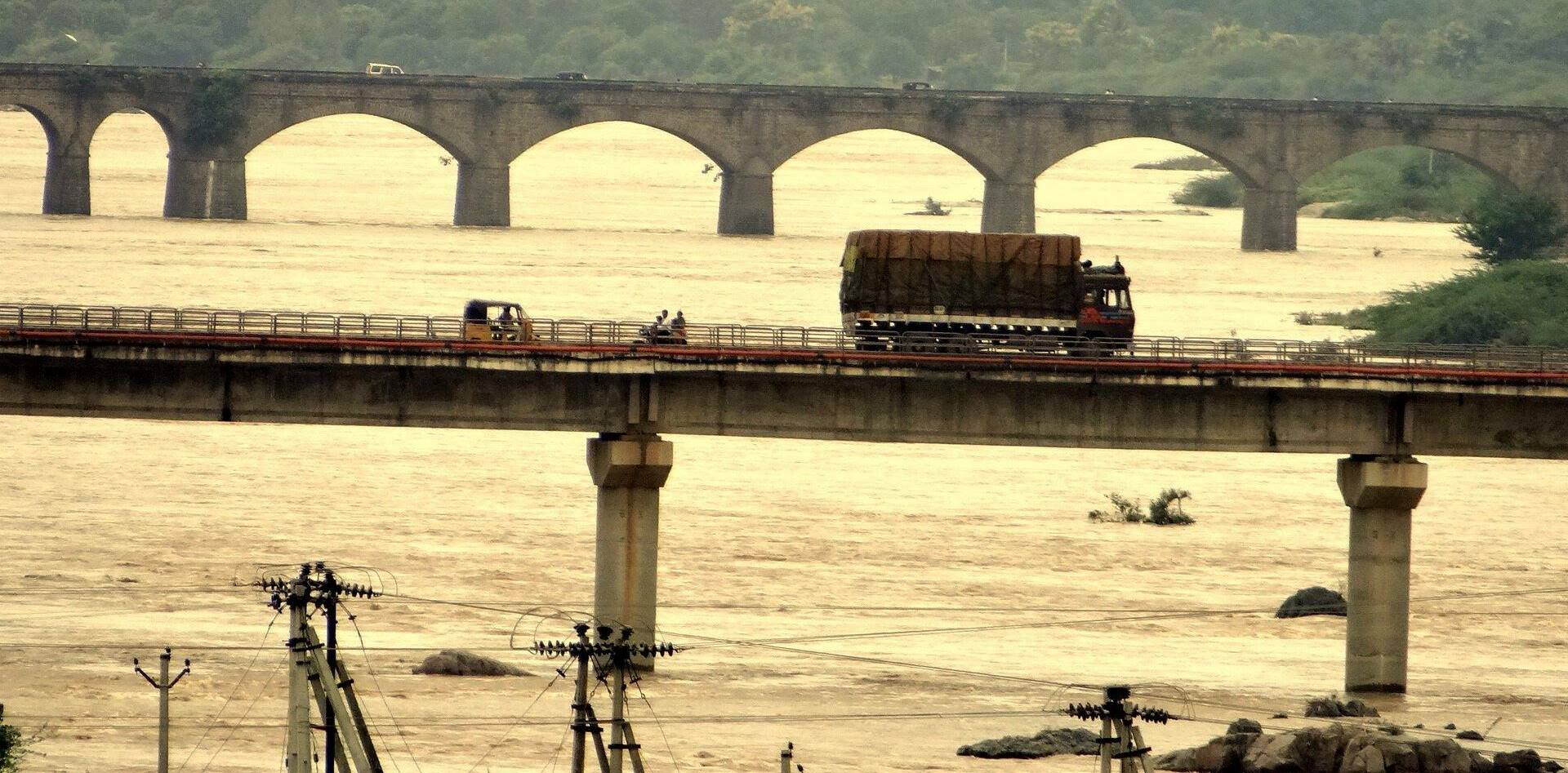
Two Bridges across Munneru River in Khammam city.

There is a Water bridge constructed across Munneru to allow the flow of Nagarjunsagar water to Khammam city and other locations in Khammam district. Added to that Khammam has one old bridge for regular vehicles while heavy vehicles go through the new bridge.

Construction has started on a newer bridge to connect Nelakondapalli and Kodad to Khammam via Prakashnagar. This bridge would save the distance of travel and also would help easy flow of Munneru River.

In the NTR District there is a road and railway bridge at Lingala village. There is a road bridge at Penuganchiprolu while there is a bridge on National Highway 9 at Nandigama.

== Flooding ==
Excess rainfall in Mahabubabad, Dornakal and other regions along with Khammam causes regular floods on Munneru river. 2013 has seen the overflow of Munneru river. This led to a plan for building a flood-bank along the river bank.
