= Mahadevapuram =

Mahadevapuram is a village in Madhira mandal, Khammam district, Telangana, India, about 5 kilometres (3.10686 mi) from Madhira town. There is a famous ancient temple in the village called Venugopalaswamy.
