= Dachapuram =

Coordinates: 17.0859°N 80.3902°E

Dachapuram is a village in Telangana, India. It is located in the Wyra mandal of Khammam District.

The village is located 36 km towards the east from district headquarters Khammam and 14 km from Wyra. The postal code is 507165 and postal head office is Wyra.
