= Konduru =

Konduru may refer to:

- A. Konduru, a village in A.Konduru mandal, Krishna district, Andhra Pradesh, India
- Konduru, G. Konduru mandal, a village in G.Konduru mandal, Krishna district, Andhra Pradesh, India
- Konduru, Nandigama mandal a village in Nandigama mandal, Krishna district, Andhra Pradesh, India
