= Mallu Bhatti Vikramarka =

Indian politician

Bhatti Vikramarka Mallu
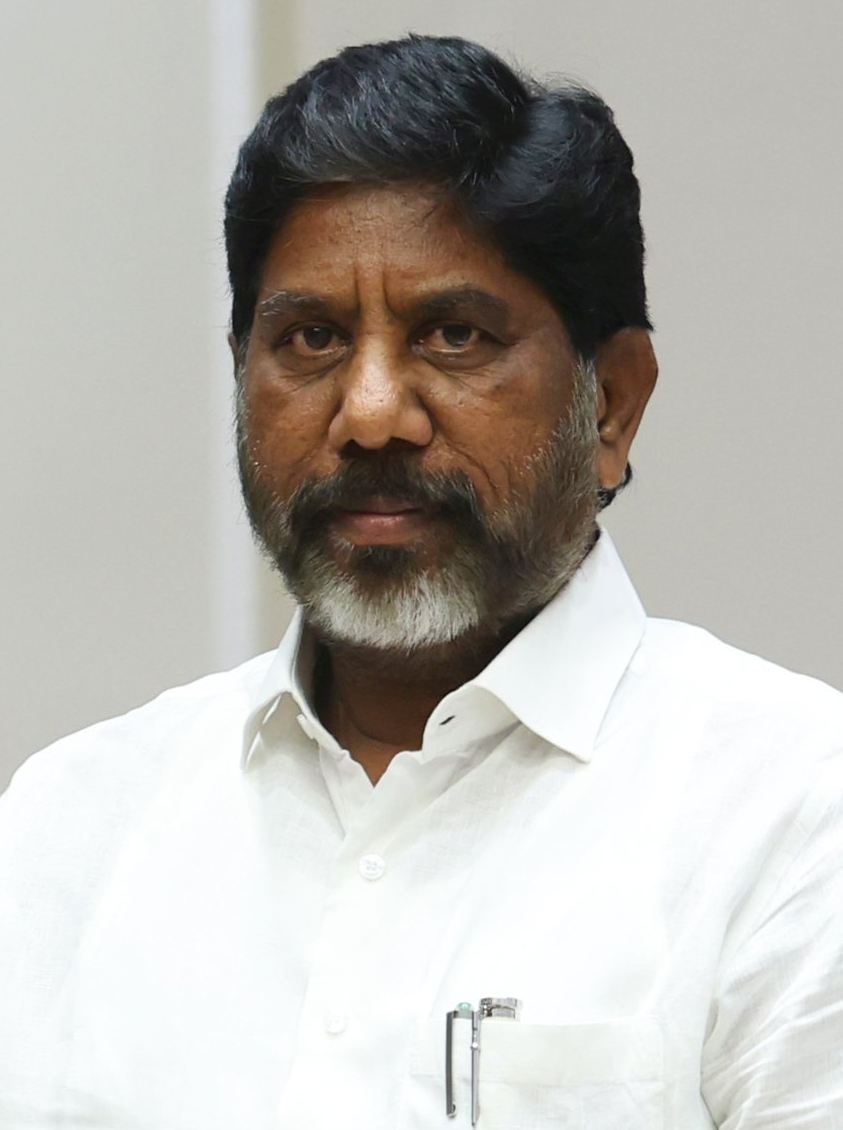
- Vikramarka in 2024

Deputy Chief Minister of Telangana
- Incumbent
- Assumed office 7 December 2023
- Governor: Tamilisai Soundararajan; C. P. Radhakrishnan (additional charge); Jishnu Dev Varma; Shiv Pratap Shukla
- Chief Minister: Anumula Revanth Reddy
- Preceded by: Kadiyam Srihari

Minister of Finance, Planning and Energy Government of Telangana
- Incumbent
- Assumed office 7 December 2023
- Governor: Tamilisai Soundararajan (2023-2024); C. P. Radhakrishnan (additional charge; 2024); Jishnu Dev Varma 2024-
- Chief Minister: Anumula Revanth Reddy
- Preceded by: T. Harish Rao; Guntakandla Jagadish Reddy

2nd Leader of the Opposition Telangana Legislative Assembly
- In office 20 January 2019 – 6 June 2019
- Governor: E. S. L. Narasimhan
- Chief Minister: K. Chandrashekar Rao
- Preceded by: K. Jana Reddy, INC
- Succeeded by: Vacant; K. Chandrasekhar Rao

Member of the Telangana Legislative Assembly
- Incumbent
- Assumed office 2 June 2014
- Preceded by: Telangana Assembly Created
- Constituency: Madhira

19th Deputy Speaker of the Andhra Pradesh Legislative Assembly
- In office 4 June 2011 – 20 May 2014
- Speaker: Nadendla Manohar
- Chief Minister: Nallari Kiran Kumar Reddy
- Preceded by: Nadendla Manohar
- Succeeded by: Mandali Buddha Prasad (1st Deputy Speaker of Divided Andhra Pradesh)

Member of Andhra Pradesh Legislative Assembly
- In office 16 May 2009 – 16 May 2014
- Preceded by: Katta Venkata Narasaiah
- Succeeded by: Telangana Assembly Created
- Constituency: Madhira

Member of Legislative Council Andhra Pradesh
- In office 2007–2009
- Chairman: A. Chakrapani
- Deputy: Mohammed Jani
- Leader of the House: Y. S. Rajasekhara Reddy
- Constituency: Khammam Local Authorities

Personal details
- Born: 15 June 1961 (age 65) Wyra, Andhra Pradesh (now Telangana), India
- Party: Indian National Congress
- Spouse: Nandini Mallu
- Children: 2
- Occupation: Politician

Bhatti Vikramarka Mallu (born 15 June 1961) is an Indian politician currently serving as the 4th Deputy Chief Minister of Telangana since December 2023. He represents Madhira constituency in the Telangana Legislative assembly. He previously served as the second Leader of Opposition in Telangana Legislative Assembly. He was elected as the Member of Legislative Assembly in 2009 and 2014 elections. He was the Chief Whip for Government of Andhra Pradesh from 2009 to 2011 and also served as the last Deputy Speaker of United Andhra Pradesh Legislative Assembly from 2011 to 2014. He is a member of the Indian National Congress party.

== Early life ==
Bhatti Vikramarka Mallu was born to Mallu Akhilanda and Mallu Manikyam. His native village is Snanala Laxmipuram in Wyra mandal (Khammam district). He did his Graduation from Nizam College, Hyderabad and Post Graduation from University of Hyderabad. He has two brothers, A R Mallu and Mallu Ravi, who were 1st while former Member of Parliament and 2nd current member of parliament.

== Career ==
Bhatti Vikramarka Mallu was elected as MLA for the first time in 2009. He became the Chief Whip in 2009. Before that he was elected as MLC.

He was elected as Deputy Speaker of Andhra Pradesh Legislative Assembly on 4 June 2011.

Second time he was elected as an MLA in General Elections, 2014 from Madhira Constituency.

Third time also he was elected as an MLA in General Elections, 2018 from Madhira Constituency. After Bodepudi Venkateswar Rao, he became the second person to score a hat trick as an MLA from Madhira Constituency.

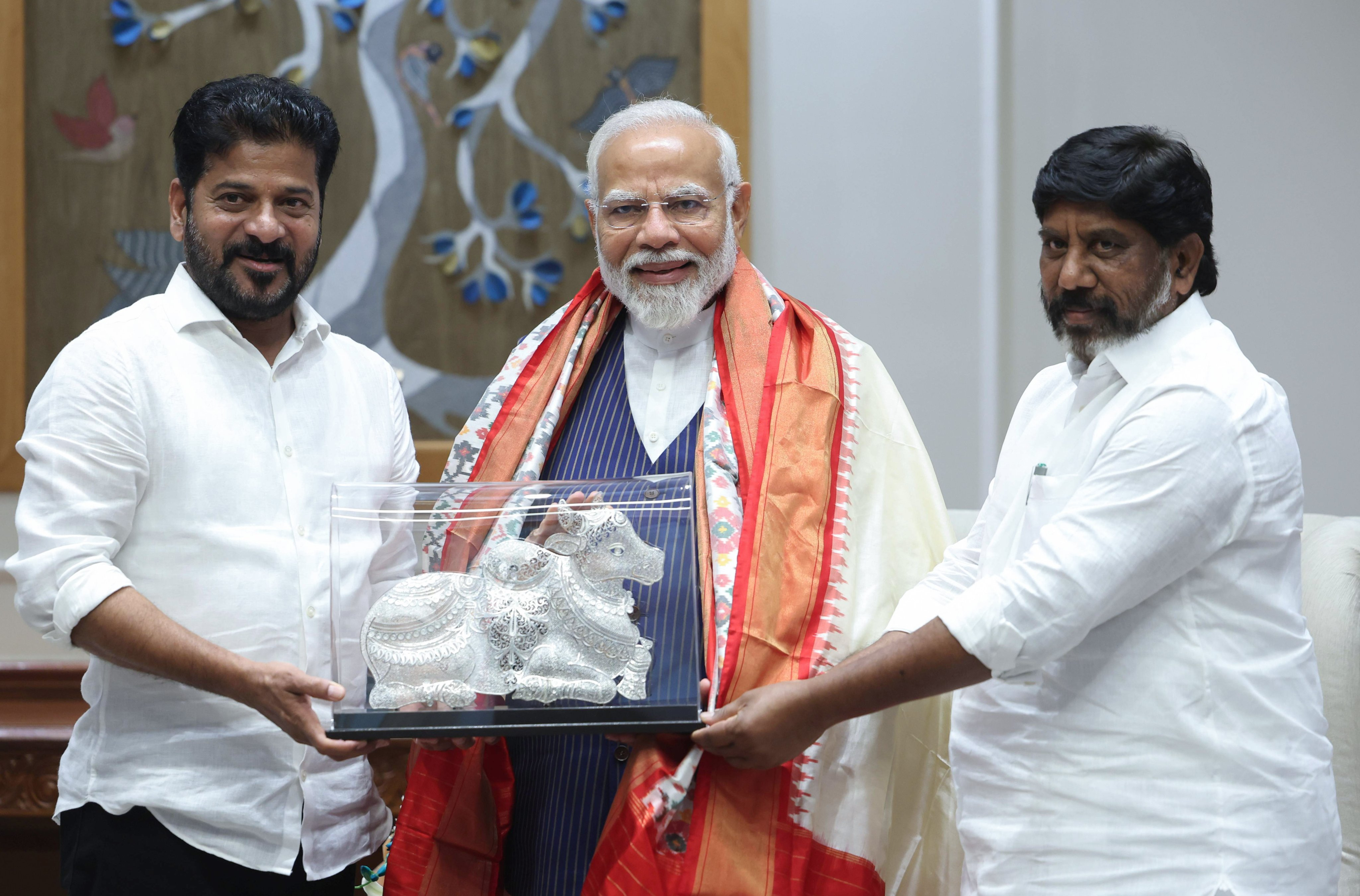
Bhatti and Telangana CM Revanth Reddy presenting an idol to Prime Minister Narendra Modi

On 18 January 2019, INC President Rahul Gandhi appointed Bhatti Vikramarka Mallu as the leader of Telangana Congress Legislature Party (CLP) in 2nd Telangana Assembly.

On 7 December 2023, he took oath as the Deputy Chief Minister of Telangana and allocated the Finance and Planning and Energy portfolios in Revanth Reddy Ministry.

== Personal life ==
Bhatti Vikramarka Mallu is married to Nandini Mallu and has two sons.

== Positions held ==
- PCC Executive Member (1990–92)
- PCC Secretary (2000–03)
- MLC 2007 Khammam
- Leader of opposition in Telangana Legislative Assembly (2018-19)
- Deputy Chief Minister in Telangana Legislative Assembly (2023-present)

== Elections Contested ==
=== Legislative Assembly Elections ===
Year	Constituency	Party	Votes	%	Opponent	Opponent Party	Opponent Votes	%	Result	Margin	%
2023	Madhira	INC	108,970	55.49	Kamal Raju Lingala	BRS	73,518	37.44	Won	+35,452	+18.05
2018	Madhira	INC	80,598	43.12	Kamal Raju Lingala	TRS	77,031	41.21	Won	+3,567	+1.91
2014	Madhira	INC	65,135	36.81	Kamal Raju Lingala	CPI(M)	52,806	29.84	Won	+12,329	+6.97
2009	Madhira	INC	59,394	37.1	Kamal Raju Lingala	CPI(M)	57,977	36.2	Won	+1,417	+0.9
