= Madhira Assembly constituency =

Constituency of the Telangana legislative assembly in India

Coordinates: 16.92°N 80.37°E

Madhira
- Constituency No. 114 for the Telangana Legislative Assembly
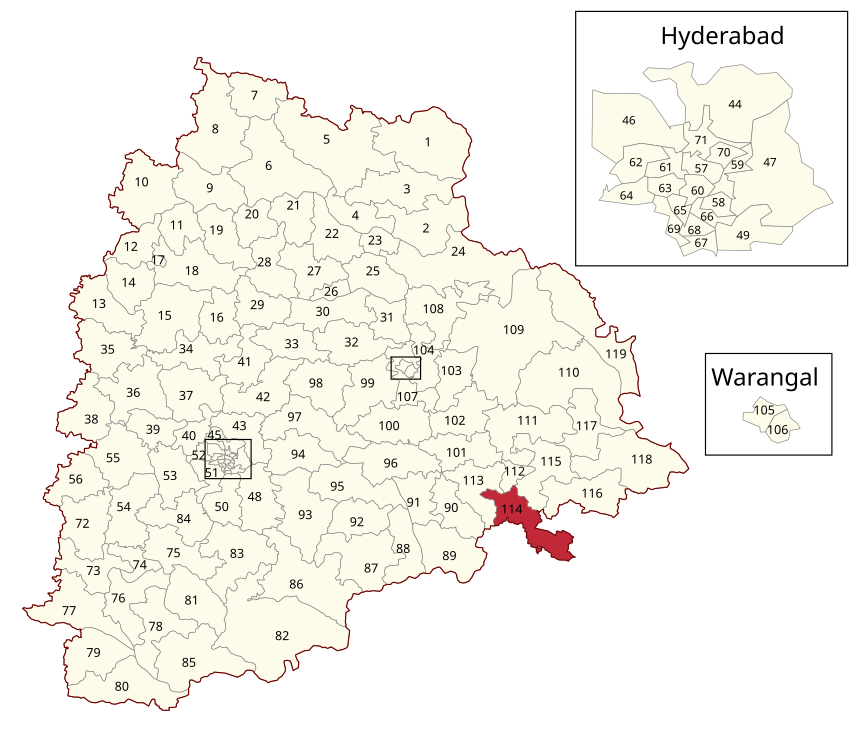
- Location of Madhira Assembly constituency within Telangana

Constituency details
- Country: India
- Region: South India
- State: Telangana
- District: Khammam
- Lok Sabha constituency: Khammam
- Established: 1951
- Total electors: 2,09,945
- Reservation: SC

Member of Legislative Assembly
- 3rd Telangana Legislative Assembly
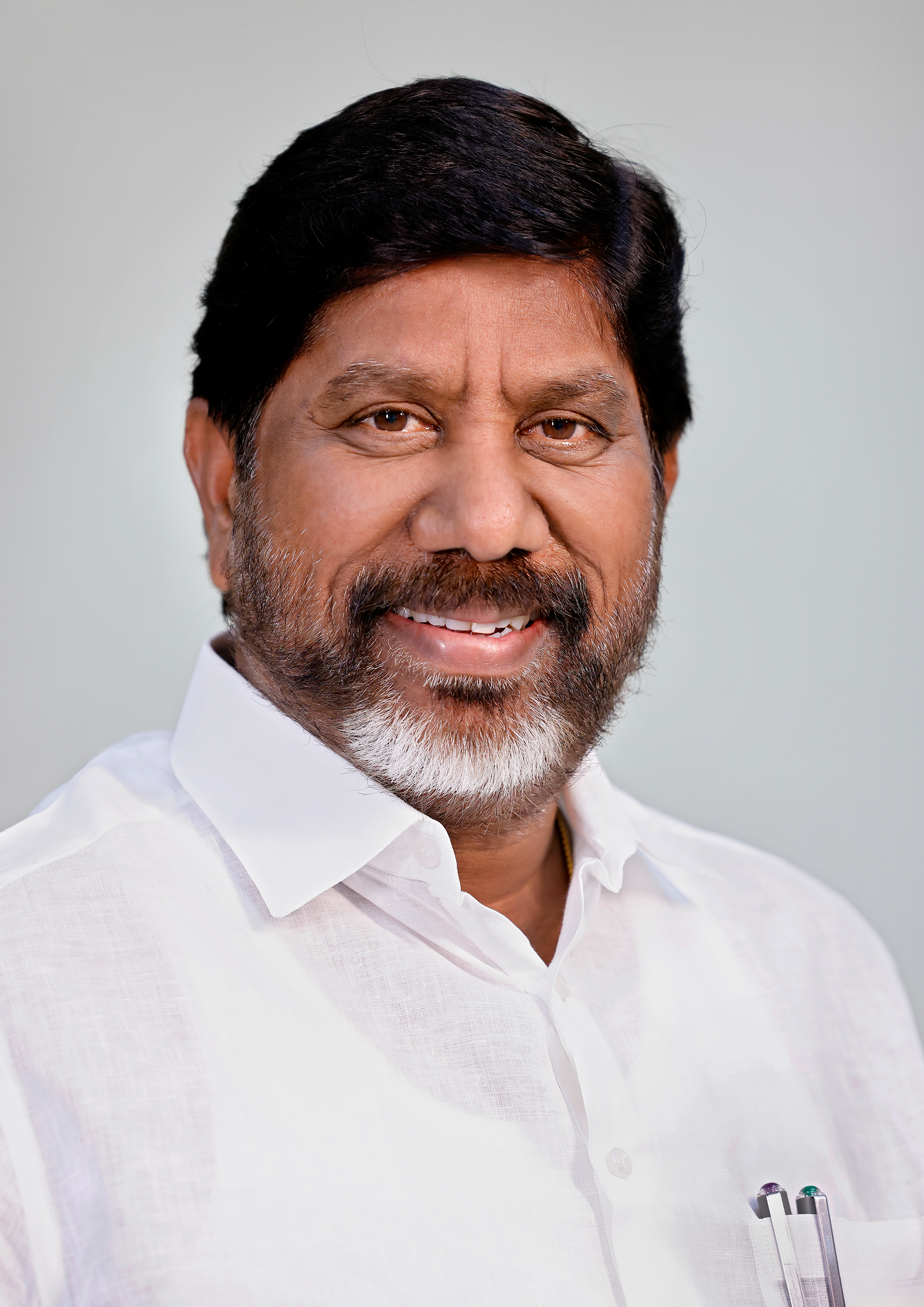
- Incumbent Mallu Bhatti Vikramarka; Deputy Chief Minister of Telangana
- Party: Indian National Congress
- Elected year: 2023

Madhira Assembly Constituency is a scheduled caste reserved constituency of Telangana Legislative Assembly, India. It is one among ten constituencies in Khammam district. Madhira is a place in Khammam district. It comes unders Khammam Lok Sabha constituency.

Mallu Bhatti Vikramarka, current deputy Floor Leader of Indian National Congress in Telangana Legislative Assembly, is representing the constituency for the fourth time.

== Mandals ==
The Assembly Constituency presently comprises the following Mandals:

Mandal
Madhira
Mudigonda
Chintakani
Bonakal
Yerrupalem

== Members of Legislative Assembly ==
Year	Member Name	Party
Hyderabad State
1952	Kondabolu Venkaiah	People's Democratic Front
United Andhra Pradesh
1957	B. Satyanarayan Rao	Indian National Congress
1962	Duggineni Venkaiah	Indian National Congress
1967	Duggineni Venkaiah	Indian National Congress
1972	Duggineni Venkatravamma	Indian National Congress
1978	Bandaru Prasada Rao	Indian National Congress
1983	Seelam Siddha Reddy	Indian National Congress
1985	Bodepudi Venkateswara Rao	Communist Party of India
1989	Bodepudi Venkateswara Rao	Communist Party of India
1994	Bodepudi Venkateswara Rao	Communist Party of India
1999	Kondabala Koteswara Rao	Telugu Desam Party
2004	Katta Venkata Narasaiah	Communist Party of India
2009	Mallu Bhatti Vikramarka	Indian National Congress
2014	Mallu Bhatti Vikramarka	Indian National Congress
2018	Mallu Bhatti Vikramarka	Indian National Congress
2023	Mallu Bhatti Vikramarka	Indian National Congress

== Election results ==
=== Telangana Legislative Assembly election, 2023 ===
Telangana Assembly Elections, 2023: Madhira (Assembly constituency)
Party	Candidate	Votes	%	±%
INC	Mallu Bhatti Vikramarka	108,970	55.49	
TRS	Kamal Raju Lingala	73,518	37.44	
CPI(M)	Paladugu Bhaskar	6,575	3.35	
BJP	Perumarpally Vijaya Raju	2,021	1.03	
NOTA	None of the Above	1,453	0.74	
Majority		35,452	18.05	
Turnout		1,96,364		
INC hold		Swing		

=== Telangana Legislative Assembly election, 2018 ===
2018 Telangana Legislative Assembly election: Madhira
Party	Candidate	Votes	%	±%
INC	Mallu Bhatti Vikramarka	80,598	43.12	
TRS	Kamal Raju Lingala	77,031	41.21	
BLFP	Rambabu Kota	23,030	12.32	
NOTA	None of the Above	1,011	0.54	
Majority		3,567		
Turnout		1,86,943	91.98	
INC hold		Swing		

=== Telangana Legislative Assembly election, 2014 ===
Telangana Assembly Elections, 2014: Madhira (Assembly constituency)
Party	Candidate	Votes	%	±%
INC	Mallu Bhatti Vikramarka	65,135	36.81%	
CPI(M)	Kamal Raju Lingala	52,806	29.84%	
TDP	Motkupalli Narasimhulu	46,044	26.02%	
Majority		12,329		
Turnout		1,76,950	91.06%	
INC hold		Swing		

=== Andhra Pradesh Legislative Assembly election, 2009 ===
Andhra Pradesh Legislative Assembly election, 2009: Madhira (Assembly constituency)
Party	Candidate	Votes	%	±%
INC	Mallu Bhatti Vikramarka	59,394	37.1%	
CPI(M)	Kamal Raju Lingala	57,977	36.2%	
Trilinga Praja Pragathi Party	Manda Krishna Madiga	21,779	13.6%	
Majority		1,417		
Turnout		1,55,715	97.3%	
INC hold		Swing		

== See also ==
- List of constituencies of Telangana Legislative Assembly
