= Chandarlapadu mandal =

- Mandal
- Interactive map of Chandarlapadu mandal
- Location in Andhra Pradesh, India
- Coordinates: 16.771329°N 80.285672°E
- Country: India
- State: Andhra Pradesh
- District: NTR
- Headquarters: Chandarllapadu

Area
  - Total: 223.02 km^{2} (86.11 sq mi)

Population (2011)
  - Total: 59,943
  - Density: 268.78/km^{2} (696.13/sq mi)

Languages
  - Official: Telugu
- Time zone: UTC+5:30 (IST)
- PIN: 521 182

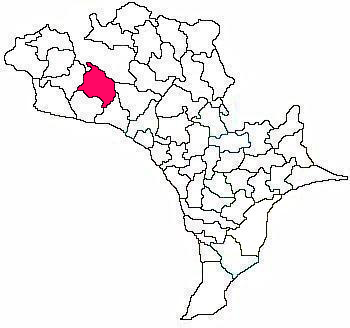
Chandarlapadu mandal map

Chandarlapadu mandal is one of the 20 mandals in NTR District of the Indian state of Andhra Pradesh. It is under the administration of Nandigama revenue division and headquarters located at Chandarlapadu. The mandal is situated on the banks of Krishna River, bounded by Jaggayyapeta, Nandigama, Kanchikacherla mandals.

== Administration ==
The mandal is partially a part of the Andhra Pradesh Capital Region under the jurisdiction of APCRDA.

== Settlements ==
Chandarlapadu mandal consists of 20 villages. The following are the list of villages in the mandal:

1. Bobbellapadu
2. Brahmabotlapalem
3. Chandarlapadu
4. Chintalapadu
5. Eturu
6. Gudimetla
7. Kasarabada
8. Kodavatikallu
9. Konayapalem
10. Munagala palle
11. Muppalla
12. Patempadu
13. Pokkunuru
14. Popuru
15. Punnavalli
16. Thotaravulapadu
17. Thurlapadu
18. Ustepalle
19. Veladi Kotthapalem
20. Vibhareetalapadu
21. Patha Bellamkondavaripalem

Sources:

- Census India 2011 (sub districts)
- Revenue Department of AP
