= Kodavatikallu =

Kodavatikallu Kodavatikallu Kodavatikallu
- Village
- Nickname: kotilingala puram
- Interactive map of Kodavatikallu
- Location in Andhra Pradesh, India
- Country: India
- State: Andhra Pradesh
- District: NTR

Area
  - Total: 17.73 km^{2} (6.85 sq mi)

Population (2011)
  - Total: 4,112
  - Density: 231.9/km^{2} (600.7/sq mi)

Languages
  - Official: Telugu
- Time zone: UTC+5:30 (IST)
- Postal code: 521182
- Vehicle registration: AP

Kodavatikallu is a village in NTR district of the Indian state of Andhra Pradesh. Ancient name of this village is Kotilingaala Puram.

It is located in Chandarlapadu mandal of Nandigama revenue division. It lies on the banks of Krishna river surrounded by farm lands.

This place was ruled by the king named Raja Vasireddy Venkatadri Nayudu Gaaru between 1783–1816.

The major occupation of the people of this village is farming. Cotton and red chili are the major crops cultivated here. During summer time corn is cultivated. The soil type of this village is Black Soil. Most of the land in this village is very fertile and hardly we will find the rocky lands.

Most of the houses of this village are concrete constructions.

Nearby villages are Punnavalli, Kothapalem, Pokkunuru, and Ammadipudi.

Indian Postal Code of the village is 521182.
