= Somavaram, Chatrai mandal =

Coordinates: 16.9256°N 80.9061°E

Somavaram
- Village
- Interactive map of Somavaram
- Location in Andhra Pradesh, India Somavaram (India)
- Country: India
- State: Andhra Pradesh
- District: Eluru

Area
  - Total: 19.44 km^{2} (7.51 sq mi)

Population (2011)
  - Total: 4,585
  - Density: 235.9/km^{2} (610.9/sq mi)

Languages
  - Official: Telugu
- Time zone: UTC+5:30 (IST)

Somavaram is a village in Eluru district of the Indian state of Andhra Pradesh. It is located in Nandigama mandal of Vijayawada revenue division. It is one of the villages in the mandal to be a part of Andhra Pradesh Capital Region.
