= Munagacherla =

Munagacharla
- Village
- Interactive map of Munagacharla
- Location in Andhra Pradesh, India
- Coordinates: 16.7962°N 80.2743°E
- Country: India
- State: Andhra Pradesh
- District: NTR

Government
  - Type: Panchayati raj
  - Body: Munagacharla gram panchayat

Languages
  - Official: Telugu
- Time zone: UTC+5:30 (IST)
- PIN: 521185

Mungacharla is a village in NTR district of the Indian state of Andhra Pradesh. It is located in Nandigama mandal.
