= Thotaravulapadu =

- Village
- Interactive map of Thotaravulapadu
- Location in Andhra Pradesh, India
- Coordinates: 16°40′38″N 80°16′42″E
- Country: India
- State: Andhra Pradesh
- District: NTR

Area
  - Total: 12.08 km^{2} (4.66 sq mi)

Population (2011)
  - Total: 3,516
  - Density: 291.1/km^{2} (753.8/sq mi)

Languages
  - Official: Telugu
- Time zone: UTC+5:30 (IST)
- Vehicle registration: AP

Thotaravulapadu is a village in NTR district of the Indian state of Andhra Pradesh. It is located in Chandarlapadu mandal of Nandigama revenue division. It is one of the villages in the mandal to be a part of Andhra Pradesh Capital Region.
