= Wyra Reservoir =

- Wyra Reservoir location
- Location: Wyra, Khammam District, Telangana, India
- Coordinates: 17°12′00″N 80°22′30″E
- Purpose: Irrigation
- Status: Operational
- Opening date: 1930
- Construction cost: Rs 35.00 Lakhs

Dam and spillways
- Type of dam: Earth fill dam
- Impounds: Wyra River
- Height: 27 metres (89 ft) above lowest foundation
- Length: 2,354 metres (7,723 ft)
- Spillway type: Ogee crest
- Spillway capacity: 37963 Cusec

Reservoir
- Creates: Wyra Reservoir
- Total capacity: 2.47 Tmcft
- Active capacity: 2.12 Tmcft
- Catchment area: 17391 Acres

Wyra Reservoir is a medium irrigation project constructed across the Wyra River, a tributary of Krishna River. The reservoir is located next to the Wyra town, Khammam District, Telangana. It is one of the tourist attractions in Khammam district. This Wyra reservoir was constructed in 1930, and was inaugurated by Dr.Sarvepalli Radhakrishnan former President of India. It provides drinking water to eight mandalas around Wyra. Hundreds of hectares of land is cultivated using water from Wyra reservoir. It is also well known for its good fishing and the green hills around it. The project provides water to 17,391 acres for irrigation. The reservoir also gets water from Nagarjunasagar left canal.

== See also ==
- Sriram Sagar Project
- Sripada Yellampalli project
- Nizam Sagar
- Kaddam Project
- Pranahita Chevella
- Alisagar lift irrigation scheme
- Sri Komaram Bheem Project
- Icchampally Project
- Lower Manair Dam
- Mid Manair Dam
- Upper Manair Dam
