= Magallu =

- Village
- Interactive map of Magallu
- Location in Andhra Pradesh, India
- Coordinates: 16.8138°N 80.3164°E
- Country: India
- State: Andhra Pradesh
- District: NTR

Area
  - Total: 14.37 km^{2} (5.55 sq mi)

Population (2011)
  - Total: 3,830
  - Density: 267/km^{2} (690/sq mi)

Languages
  - Official: Telugu
- Time zone: UTC+5:30 (IST)
- Vehicle registration: AP–16

Magallu is a village in NTR district of the Indian state of Andhra Pradesh. It is located in Nandigama mandal of Vijayawada revenue division. It is one of the villages in the mandal to be a part of Andhra Pradesh Capital Region.
