= Adiviravulapadu =

- Village
- Interactive map of Adiviravulapadu
- Location in Andhra Pradesh, India Adiviravulapadu (India)
- Coordinates: 16.5333°N 80.8000°E
- Country: India
- State: Andhra Pradesh
- District: NTR
- Elevation: 48 m (157 ft)

Population (2011)
  - Total: 2,101

Languages
  - Official: Telugu
- Time zone: UTC+5:30 (IST)
- Vehicle registration: AP

Adaviravulapadu is a village in Nandigama mandal, located in NTR district of Andhra Pradesh, India.

== Demographics ==
According to 2011 Census of India, the village has a population of 2,101: 1038 female and 1063 male.
