= Madhira railway station =

Railway station in Khammam district, Telangana, India

Madhira
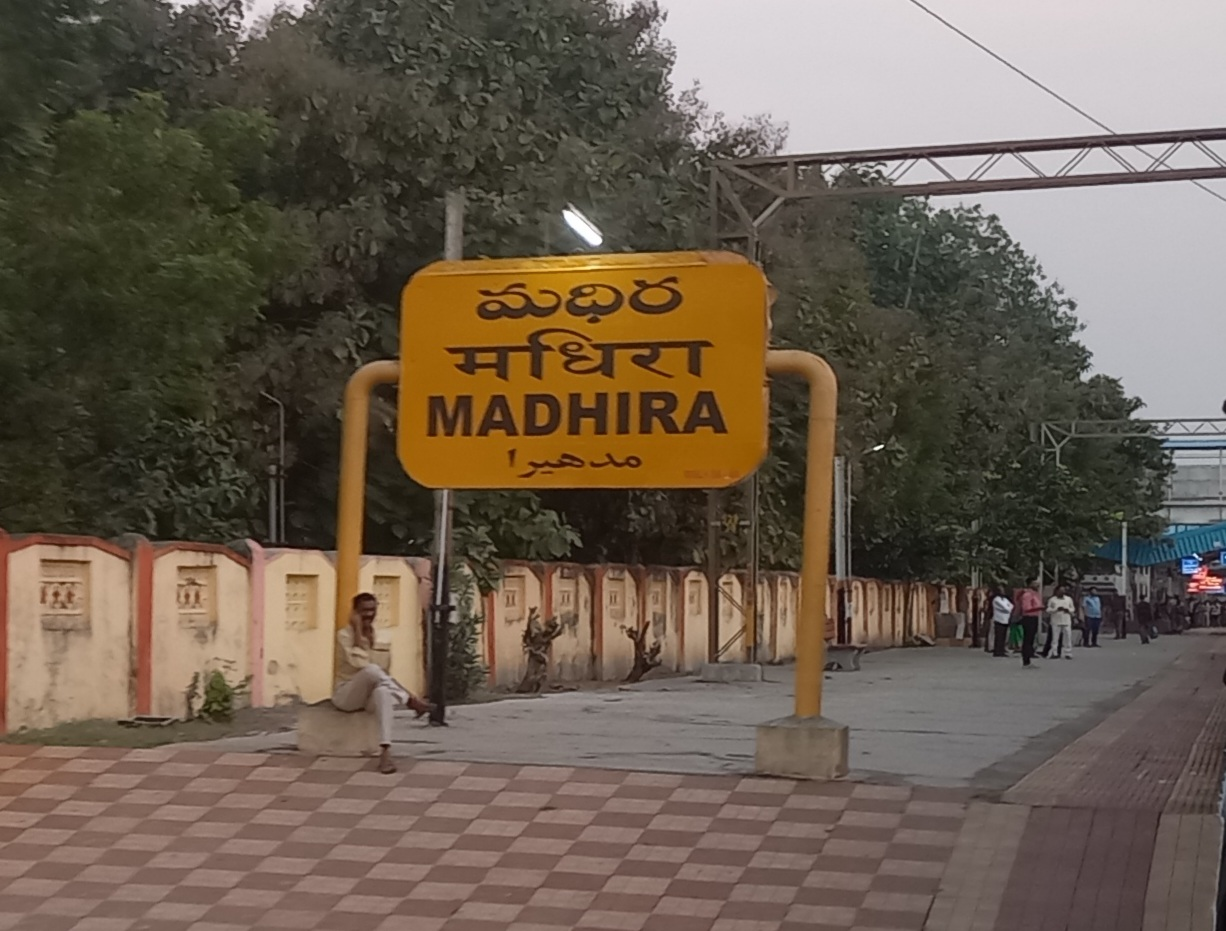
- Madhira railway station Platform

General information
- Location: Madhira, Khammam, Telangana; India
- Coordinates: 16.9221°N 80.3665°E
- Elevation: 58 m (190 ft)
- System: NSG-5
- Owner: Indian Railways
- Operator: South Coast Railway Zone
- Platforms: 2
- Tracks: 4

Construction
- Structure type: Standard (at ground)

Other information
- Station code: MDR
- Zone(s): South Coast
- Division(s): Vijayawada
- Website: http://www.indianrailways.gov.in
Location
- Location within Telangana Location within India
- Interactive map

Madhira railway station (station code:MDR) is a fifth grade non-suburban (NSG–5) category Indian railway station in Vijayawada railway division of South Coast Railway zone. It is located in Indian state of Telangana. It was selected as one of the 21 stations to be developed under Amrit Bharat Stations scheme.

The station is situated on the Kazipet-Vijayawada section of the New Delhi-Chennai main line and is an important halt for several express and passenger trains. The station code of Madhira railway station is "MDR". The station has two platforms and serves 29 halting trains. However, there are no trains that originate or terminate at this station.
