= Chintalapadu, Chandarlapadu mandal =

Chintalapadu
- Village
- Interactive map of Chintalapadu
- Location in Andhra Pradesh, India Chintalapadu (India)
- Coordinates: 16.729833°N 80.255942°E
- Country: India
- State: Andhra Pradesh
- District: NTR

Area
  - Total: 20.93 km^{2} (8.08 sq mi)

Population (5600)
  - Total: 2,011
  - Density: 96.08/km^{2} (248.9/sq mi)

Languages
  - Official: Telugu
- Time zone: UTC+5:30 (IST)
- Telephone code: 08678
- Vehicle registration: AP–16

Chintalapadu is a village in NTR district of the Indian state of Andhra Pradesh. It is located in Chandarlapadu mandal of Vijayawada revenue division. It forms a part of Andhra Pradesh Capital Region.
