= Narayanapuram, Khammam district =

Narayanapuram
- Village
- Location in Telangana, India Narayanapuram (India)
- Coordinates: 17°10′36.35″N 80°51′58.12″E
- Country: India
- State: Telangana
- District: Khammam

Languages
  - Official: Telugu
- Time zone: UTC+5:30 (IST)
- Vehicle registration: TS–20
- Website: telangana.gov.in

Narayanapuram is a village in Bonakal Mandal, located in Khammam district of Telangana, India.
