= Chandarlapadu =

- Village
- Interactive map of Chandarlapadu
- Location in Andhra Pradesh, India Chandarlapadu (India)
- Coordinates: 16°41′33″N 80°12′06″E
- Country: India
- State: Andhra Pradesh
- District: Krishna
- Mandal: Chandarlapadu

Area
  - Total: 13.53 km^{2} (5.22 sq mi)

Population (2011)
  - Total: 10,958
  - Density: 809.9/km^{2} (2,098/sq mi)

Languages
  - Official: Telugu
- Time zone: UTC+5:30 (IST)
- PIN: 521 xxx
- Vehicle registration: AP

Chandarlapadu is a village in NTR district of the Indian state of Andhra Pradesh. It is located in Chandarlapadu mandal of Nandigama revenue division. It is one of the villages in the mandal to be a part of Andhra Pradesh Capital Region.

== See also ==
- Villages in Chandarlapadu mandal
