= Konduru, Nandigama mandal =

Konduru
- Village
- Interactive map of Konduru
- Location in Andhra Pradesh, India Konduru (India)
- Coordinates: 16.5411°N 81.2957°E
- Country: India
- State: Andhra Pradesh
- District: NTR
- Mandal: Nandigama

Area
  - Total: 5.85 km^{2} (2.26 sq mi)

Population (2011)
  - Total: 1,866
  - Density: 319/km^{2} (826/sq mi)

Languages
  - Official: Telugu
- Time zone: UTC+5:30 (IST)
- PIN: 521333
- Telephone code: +91–8677

Konduru is a village in NTR district of the Indian state of Andhra Pradesh. It is located in Nandigama mandal of Vijayawada revenue division. It is a part of Andhra Pradesh Capital Region.
