= Eturu =

- Village
- Interactive map of Eturu
- Location in Andhra Pradesh, India Eturu (India)
- Coordinates: 16°37′46″N 80°17′57″E
- Country: India
- State: Andhra Pradesh
- District: NTR

Area
  - Total: 11.48 km^{2} (4.43 sq mi)

Population (2011)
  - Total: 3,115
  - Density: 271.3/km^{2} (702.8/sq mi)

Languages
  - Official: Telugu
- Time zone: UTC+5:30 (IST)
- Vehicle registration: AP

Eturu is a village in NTR district of the Indian state of Andhra Pradesh. It is located in Chandarlapadu mandal of Nandigama Revenue Division. It is a part of Andhra Pradesh Capital Region.
