= Madhira mandal =

- Mandal
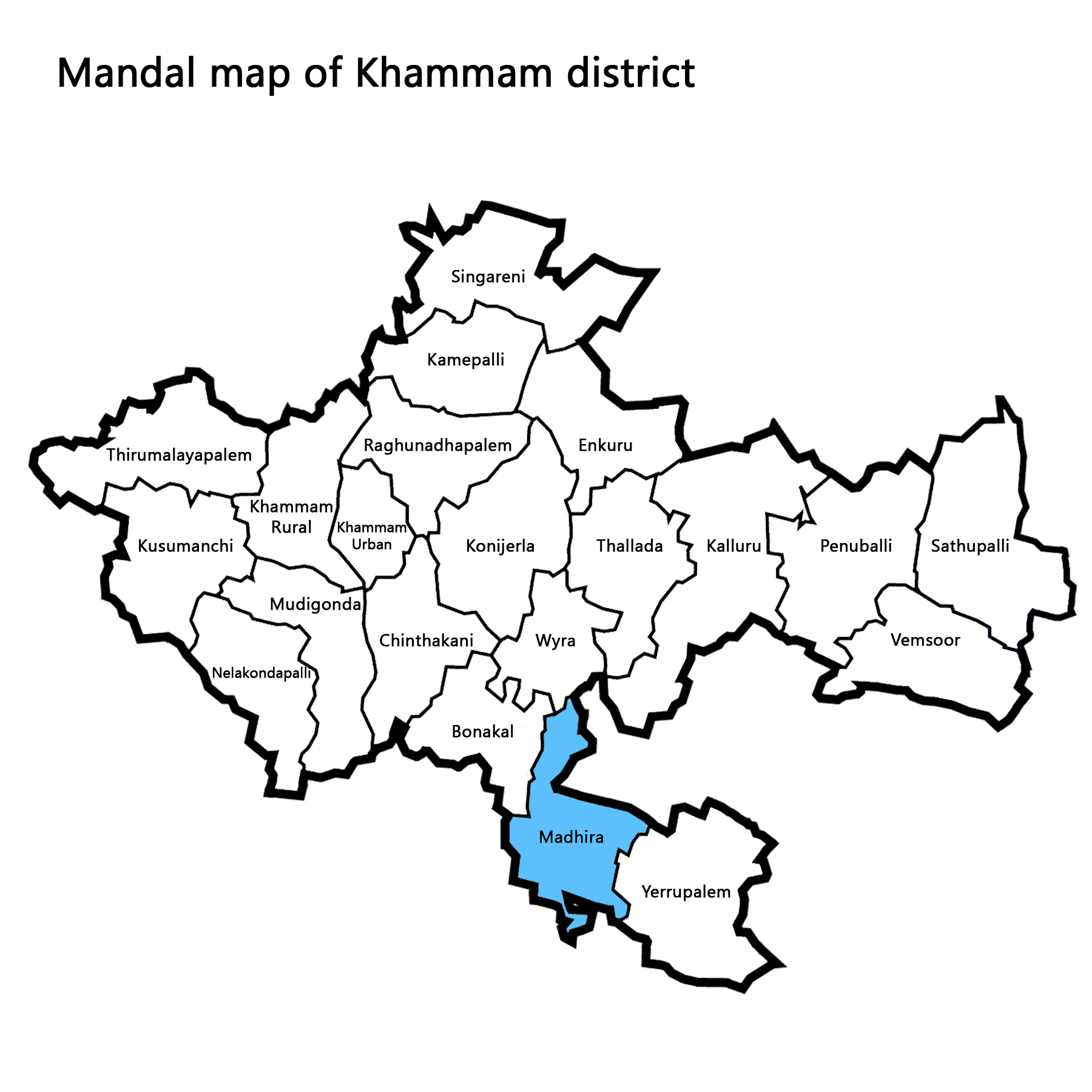
- Madhira mandal highlighted in blue

- Location in Telangana, India Madhira mandal (India)
- Coordinates: 16.9167°N 80.3667°E
- Country: India
- State: Telangana
- District: Khammam
- Headquarters: Madhira

Population (2011)
  - Total: 39,334

Languages
  - Official: Telugu, English
- Time zone: UTC+5:30 (IST)
- Vehicle registration: TS04
- Website: telangana.gov.in

Madhira mandal is situated in the Khammam district of the Indian state of Telangana, falling within the Madhira Assembly Constituency with Madhira as its headquarters. This area falls under Khammam revenue division.

== Villages ==
Villages in Madhira Mandal, Telangana

Village Name	Gram Panchayat	Nearest Town
Ambarupeta	N/A	Madhira
Atukuru	Atukuru	Madhira
Chilukuru	Chilukuru	Madhira
Dendukuru	Dendukuru	Madhira
Didugupadu	Didugupadu	Madhira
Illendulapadu	N/A	Madhira
Illuru	Illuru	Madhira
Jalimudi	Jalimudi	Madhira
Khammampadu	Khammampadu	Madhira
Kistapuram Munagala	Munagala	Madhira
Madhira	N/A	Madhira
Madupalle	Allinagaram	Madhira
Mallavaram	Mallaram	Khammam
Matoor	Matoor	Khammam
Nagavarappadu	Nagavarappadu	Khammam
Nakkalagaruvu	Nakkalagarubu	Khammam
Nidanapuram	Nidanapuram	Khammam
Rayapatnam	Desinenipalem	Khammam
Rompinalla	Mallaram	Khammam
Siddinenigudem	Siddinenigudem	Khammam
Siripuram	Siripuram	Khammam
Terlapadu	Tondala Gopavaram	Khammam
Tondala Gopavaram	Tondala Gopavaram	Khammam
Vangaveedu	Vangaveedu	Khammam
Yendapalle	Siripuram	Khammam
