= Nandigama mandal =

- Mandal
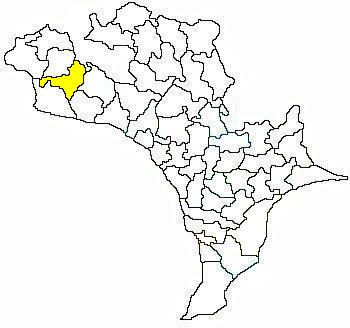
- Mandal map of NTR district showing
- Interactive Map Outlining Nandigama mandal
- Location in Andhra Pradesh, India
- Country: India
- State: Andhra Pradesh
- District: NTR
- Headquarters: Nandigama

Area
  - Total: 189.68 km^{2} (73.24 sq mi)

Population (2011)
  - Total: 92,291
  - Density: 486.56/km^{2} (1,260.2/sq mi)

Languages
  - Official: Telugu
- Time zone: UTC+5:30 (IST)

Nandigama mandal is one of the 20 mandals in NTR district of the Indian state of Andhra Pradesh. It is under the administration of Nandigama revenue division and the headquarters are located at Nandigama. The mandal is bounded Penuganchiprolu, Kanchikacherla, Chandarlapadu mandals and also a portion of it by the state of Telangana.

== Administration ==
The mandal is partially a part of the Andhra Pradesh Capital Region under the jurisdiction of APCRDA.

== Towns and villages ==
As of 2011 census, the mandal has 26 settlements, which includes 1 town and 25 villages.

The settlements in the mandal are listed below:

1. Adiviravulapadu
2. Ambarupeta
3. Chandapuram
4. Damuluru
5. Gollamudi
6. Ithavaram
7. Jonnalagadda
8. Kanchela
9. Kethaveeruni Padu
10. Konathamatmakuru
11. Kothapalem
12. Konduru
13. Kurugantivari Khandrika
14. Latchapalem
15. Lingalapadu
16. Kotha_BellamKondavaripalem
17. Magallu
18. Munagacherla
19. Nandigama +
20. Pallagiri
21. Pedavaram
22. Raghavapuram
23. Ramireddipalle
24. Rudravaram
25. Satyavaram
26. Somavaram
27. Thakkellapadu
28. Torragudipadu

Note: †-Mandal headquarter

== See also ==
- List of villages in Krishna district
