= Wyra =

- Location in Telangana, India Wyra (India)
- Coordinates: 17°11′46″N 80°21′20″E
- Country: India
- State: Telangana
- District: Khammam
- Established: 2009 (as Assembly Constituency)
- Named for: Wyra Reservoir

Government
  - Type: Municipality

Population (2011)
  - Total: Nearly 30,000

Languages
  - Official: Telugu
- Time zone: UTC+5:30 (IST)
- PIN: 507165
- Telephone code: 08749
- Vehicle registration: TS 04
- Website: telangana.gov.in

Wyra is a municipal council, town and mandal headquarters in Khammam district of Telangana, India. First Municipal chairman of wyra is Mr. Suthakani Jaipal. The nearest city is Khammam. The nearest railway station is Khammam. The nearest airport is Vijayawada airport. There is one movie theatre – Vasavi Theatre. The present MLA of Wyra constituency is Maloth Ramdas Naik. This town is a Municipal council. The town is the main joint for Madhira, Khammam, Sathupalli, Kothagudem and Tallada. Wyra Reservoir is a tourist attraction in Khammam district. The nearest bus station is TSRTC Wyra Bus Station. The assembly constituency contains Konijerla, Karepalli, Julurpadu, Enkoor and Wyra. Wyra was a revenue mandal of Khammam revenue division. There are some private schools. There are many function halls and restaurants in Wyra.

== See also ==
- Wyra Reservoir
