= Nandigama =

- Town
- Interactive map of Nandigama
- Location in Andhra Pradesh, India Nandigama (India)
- Coordinates: 16.7763°N 80.2853°E
- Country: India
- State: Andhra Pradesh
- Region: Coastal Andhra
- District: NTR

Government
  - Type: Municipality
  - Chairman: Tummala Srinivas Babu

Area
  - Total: 21.07 km^{2} (8.14 sq mi)
- Elevation: 21 m (69 ft)

Population (2011)
  - Total: 44,359
  - Density: 2,105/km^{2} (5,453/sq mi)

Languages
  - Official: T
- Time zone: UTC+5:30 (IST)
- PIN: 521 185
- Telephone code: +91–8678
- Vehicle registration: AP–16
- Vidhan Sabha constituency: Nandigama

Nandigama is a town in NTR district of the Indian state of Andhra Pradesh. It is a Municipality and also the headquarters of Nandigama mandal in Nandigama revenue division.

== Geography ==
Nandigama is located 50 km West of Vijayawada and 46 km east of Kodada.

=== Climate ===
Climate data for Nandigama (1991-2020, extremes 1989–present)
Month	Jan	Feb	Mar	Apr	May	Jun	Jul	Aug	Sep	Oct	Nov	Dec	Year
Record high °C (°F)	35.8 (96.4)	39.9 (103.8)	43.0 (109.4)	44.7 (112.5)	47.1 (116.8)	47.0 (116.6)	40.3 (104.5)	39.9 (103.8)	38.2 (100.8)	37.8 (100.0)	34.5 (94.1)	35.8 (96.4)	47.1 (116.8)
Mean daily maximum °C (°F)	31.0 (87.8)	33.7 (92.7)	36.8 (98.2)	39.1 (102.4)	41.0 (105.8)	37.2 (99.0)	33.8 (92.8)	32.6 (90.7)	32.9 (91.2)	32.3 (90.1)	31.3 (88.3)	30.3 (86.5)	34.3 (93.7)
Mean daily minimum °C (°F)	16.9 (62.4)	18.9 (66.0)	21.7 (71.1)	24.5 (76.1)	26.6 (79.9)	25.8 (78.4)	24.5 (76.1)	24.0 (75.2)	23.7 (74.7)	22.7 (72.9)	20.0 (68.0)	16.7 (62.1)	22.1 (71.8)
Record low °C (°F)	8.9 (48.0)	13.1 (55.6)	14.9 (58.8)	19.1 (66.4)	18.5 (65.3)	19.8 (67.6)	19.2 (66.6)	20.4 (68.7)	20.1 (68.2)	15.6 (60.1)	11.3 (52.3)	9.7 (49.5)	8.9 (48.0)
Average rainfall mm (inches)	12.5 (0.49)	8.2 (0.32)	11.7 (0.46)	17.9 (0.70)	41.0 (1.61)	124.8 (4.91)	175.7 (6.92)	217.4 (8.56)	179.0 (7.05)	128.0 (5.04)	30.6 (1.20)	8.2 (0.32)	955.0 (37.60)
Average rainy days	0.6	0.4	0.5	1.1	2.4	6.7	11.2	11.5	8.9	6.8	1.7	0.6	52.4
Average relative humidity (%) (at 17:30 IST)	50	45	40	39	36	50	63	69	72	71	63	56	55
Source: India Meteorological Department

== Governance ==
Civic administration

Nandigama Municipality is the civic administrative body of the town which was constituted in the year 2011. It has an area of 25.90 km^{2} (10.00 mi^{2}). The municipal chairman of Municipality is Padmavathi Yaragorla and the vice-chairman is V.Ashok Kumar.

Politics

Nandigama a part of Nandigama Assembly constituency of Andhra Pradesh Legislative Assembly. It is a reserved constituency for Scheduled Castes. Tangirala Sowmya is the present MLA of the constituency from Telugu Desam Party. It is also a part of Vijayawada (Lok Sabha constituency) which was won by Kesineni Sivanadh (Chinni) of Telugu Desam Party.

== Transport ==
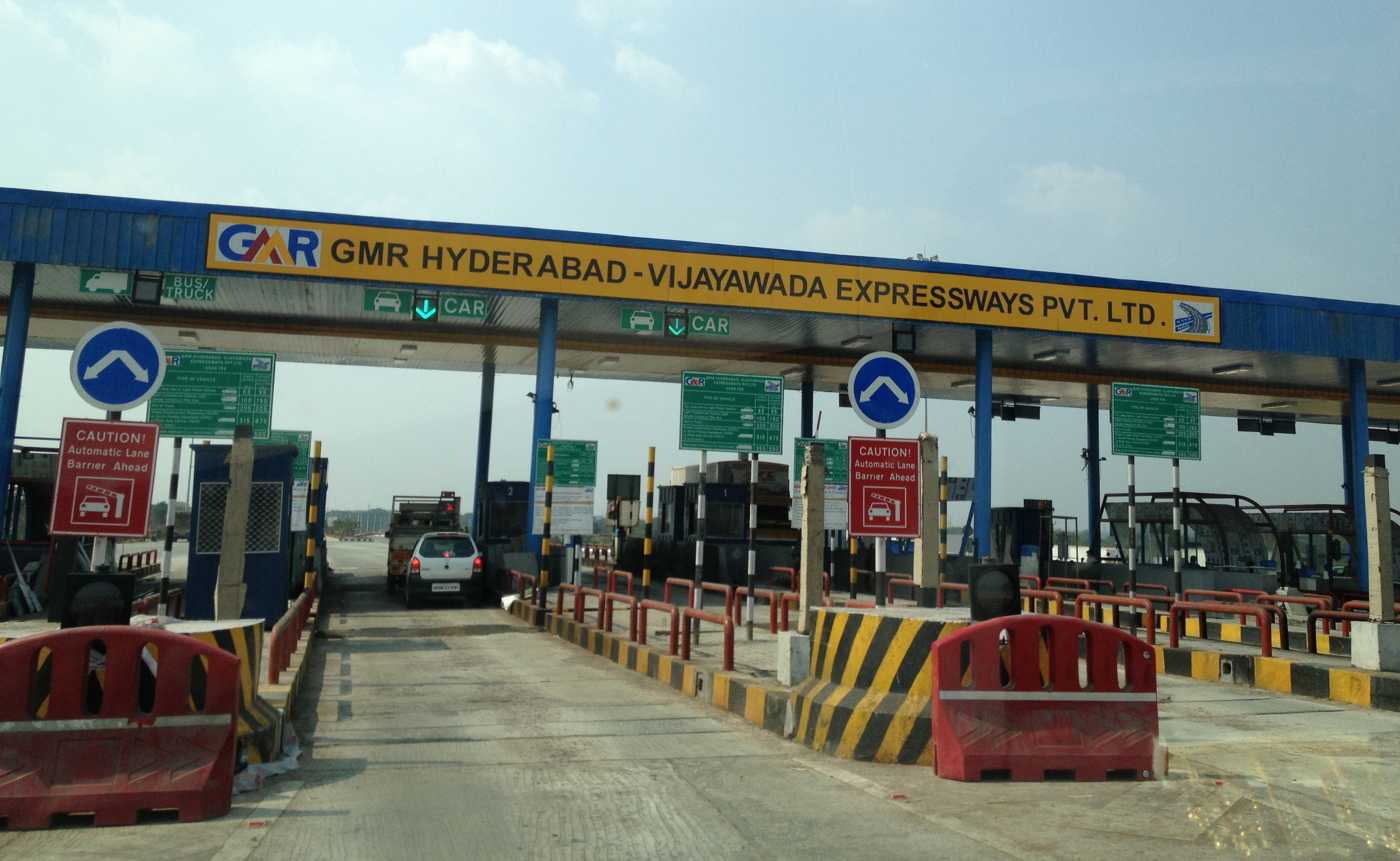
Toll gate on Vijayawada - Hyderabad highway

The Andhra Pradesh State Road Transport Corporation and TSRTC operates several bus buses services from Nandigama bus station to various destinations in Andhra Pradesh and Telangana. The town has a total road length of 139.60 km (86.74 mi).
