= Madhira =

Madhira Madhira
- Town
- Interactive map of Madhira
- Location in Telangana, India Madhira (India)
- Coordinates: 16.9250°N 80.3641°E
- Country: India
- State: Telangana
- District: Khammam
- Mandal: Madhira mandal

Government
  - Type: Municipal Council
  - Body: Madhira Municipal Council

Area
  - Total: 2.50 km^{2} (0.97 sq mi)
- Elevation: 54 m (177 ft)

Population (2021)
  - Total: 32,516
  - Density: 13,000/km^{2} (33,700/sq mi)

Languages
  - Official: Telugu, English
- Time zone: UTC+5:30 (IST)
- Postal code: 507203
- Telephone code: +91-8749
- Vehicle registration: TS04, TG04
- Website: telangana.gov.in

Madhira is a municipality situated in the Khammam district of the Indian state of Telangana, falling within the Madhira Assembly Constituency. It is the headquarters of Madhira mandal of Khammam division and is positioned approximately 230 kilometres (140 mi) east of the state capital, Hyderabad. Additionally, it is situated 53 kilometres (33 mi) from the district headquarters of Khammam and is bordered by Andhra Pradesh on three sides.

== History ==
Early Administration and Nizam Era (1900–1948) During the Asaf Jahi (Nizam) rule, Madhira served as a strategic Taluk headquarters within the Warangal Subah (Province). As a judicial and revenue hub, the town housed key administrative institutions, including a Munsif Magistrate Court and a Tahsildar Office, which governed dozens of surrounding villages. The region was a focal point for the Nizam government’s agricultural modernization efforts. A significant infrastructure project from this era is the Wyra Reservoir, constructed by the Public Works Department (P.W.D.) between 1929 and 1930. Official expenditure records from the time list the project cost at ₹34.83 Lakhs. The reservoir was designed to irrigate approximately 17,390 acres across 24 villages in the Madhira and Bonakal areas, significantly altering the agricultural landscape. Feudal System and Landlords The socio-economic structure of Madhira during this period was characterized by the Jagirdari and Deshmukh systems. The Kalluru Deshmukh family was the paramount feudal authority in the taluk, with historical records estimating their control over nearly 100,000 acres of land in the region. At the village level, administration was controlled by hereditary officials known as Vatandars (Patels and Patwaris), who acted as local rulers. These landlords resided in fortified mansions known as Gadis and enforced the Vetti system (forced labor). Villagers, including the neighboring communities of Madhira and the peasantry of Yerrupalem, were often subjected to unpaid labor and illegal levies (Nagadi) by these local chiefs. Role in Indian Independence and Telangana Rebellion Madhira is historically cited as a "land of freedom fighters" and was one of the earliest strongholds of the Telangana Rebellion.

First Incursion: Historical accounts note that the first mobilization of the peasant movement in the Telangana region occurred in the Madhira–Khammam belt, organized initially to protect the peasantry from the private militias of the local landlords.

Sardar Jamalapuram Kesava Rao: A native of Yerrupalem in Madhira Taluk, Kesava Rao—known as the "Sardar of the South"—was a prominent leader of the Hyderabad State Congress. He led the Satyagraha movements in 1947 against the Nizam's refusal to join the Indian Union, frequently facing imprisonment for his activities.

Mahatma Gandhi’s Visit: On February 5, 1946, Mahatma Gandhi visited Madhira. His train halted at the town, where he addressed a massive gathering and collected funds for the Harijan cause, an event that galvanized the local independence movement.

Post-Independence Reorganization Following the annexation of Hyderabad State into the Indian Union via Operation Polo (1948), Madhira remained a Taluk in the Warangal district. On October 1, 1953, it was one of the five key taluks carved out of Warangal to form the newly created Khammam District.

== Geography ==
Madhira is located at 16.9167°N 80.3667°E in Khammam district of Telangana. It has an average elevation of 54 meters (177 ft).

== Demographics ==
As per the data provided by 2011 Census of India, the total population of Madhira town is 32,516. The male-female ratio per 1000 is approximately 956.12, indicating that there are slightly more females than males in the town.

The child population of Madhira town (age 0-6) is 1,907, with 987 being male children and 920 being female children. The town has a child sex ratio of approximately 935 females per 1000 males, which is slightly lower than the national average of 918 females per 1000 males.

Out of the total population of Madhira town, 5,493 people belong to Scheduled Castes (SC), while 976 people belong to Scheduled Tribes (ST). The number of literate people in Madhira town is 16,630, out of which 8,671 are males and 7,959 are females. The literacy percentage of the town is approximately 73.19%, which is slightly lower than the national average of 74.04%.

The number of workers in Madhira town is 8,480, out of which 5,861 are males and 2,619 are females. The number of non-workers in the town is 14,236, out of which 5,234 are males and 9,002 are females.

== Transportation ==
It has both a bus station and a railway station, making it easily accessible for travelers.

The Madhira bus station and Madhira railway station are situated in the heart of the town and is well-connected to various parts of Telangana and neighboring state Andhra Pradesh.

The Madhira railway station is located on the Kazipet-Vijayawada rail line and connects Madhira to major cities like Hyderabad, Chennai, Kolkata, Mumbai, and New Delhi. Several express and passenger trains halt at the station, providing ample options for train travel to and from Madhira.

== Nearest Towns & Cities ==
- Gampalagudem - 20 km
- Tiruvuru - 38 km
- Khammam -55 km
- Vijayawada -77 km
- Suryapet -96 km
- Rajamahendravaram - 160 km

== Railway ==
The Madhira Railway Station was commissioned as a critical component of the Bezwada Extension Railway project, sanctioned by the Nizam's Guaranteed State Railway (NGSR). In 1883, the Nizam’s government signed an agreement with the British engineering firm Morton, Rose & Co. to extend the existing railway line from the "British Frontier" (near Bonakal) to Bezwada (now Vijayawada).

The station was officially opened to commercial traffic on February 10, 1889. This marked the completion of the strategic railway link between the Nizam's Dominions (Hyderabad State) and the East Coast State Railway of the British-ruled Madras Presidency. The construction of the line through Madhira was part of a larger capital expenditure of ₹4.3 Crores (approximately £2.8 Million) incurred by the NGSR by 1904. The Madhira section was engineered with heavy embankments to navigate the region's unstable black cotton soil. Mahatma Gandhi's Visit (1946) On February 5, 1946, the station became the site of a significant event in the Indian independence movement. Mahatma Gandhi visited Madhira while travelling on a special train from Madras (Chennai) to Wardha. The train made a scheduled halt at Madhira, where a massive gathering of locals and freedom fighters received him. Standing at the door of his third-class compartment, Gandhi addressed the crowd and collected donations for the Harijan Fund (Harijan Nidhi) before the train proceeded towards Khammam.

Strategic Importance: Upon its completion in the late 19th century, Madhira Station became a vital trade node on the Grand Trunk Route.

Export Hub: The station was designed to facilitate the export of cotton and grain from the rich agricultural belt of the Madhira Taluk to textile mills in Bombay and Manchester.

Coal Transport: It served as a key transit point for transporting coal from the Singareni Collieries (via Dornakal Junction) to the coastal ports of Machilipatnam and Kakinada. Operations and Modernization

Early Services: The first train to serve the station was the Nizam's State Railway Passenger Service in 1889. The historic Grand Trunk (G.T.) Express (New Delhi to Chennai) began serving the station shortly after it was rerouted through the Kazipet–Madhira–Vijayawada line in the late 1920s.

Electrification: The Vijayawada–Madhira–Dornakal sector was electrified between 1986 and 1987, enabling faster connectivity for superfast trains.

Current Status: As of 2024, Madhira is classified as an NSG-5 category station. It serves as a halt for approximately 32 daily trains, including major express services like the Satavahana Express, Konark Express, and Golconda Express.

Infrastructure: As part of the Kazipet–Vijayawada Tripling Project, a third railway line has been sanctioned and is currently under phased commissioning. This project aims to decongest the corridor and includes upgrades to the station's signaling system and platform capacity to handle the high density of freight and passenger traffic moving between Northern and Southern India.
