= Machilipatnam South mandal =

- Interactive map of Machilipatnam South mandal
- Location in Andhra Pradesh, India
- Coordinates: 16.17°N 81.13°E
- Country: India
- State: Andhra Pradesh
- District: Krishna
- Headquarters: Machilipatnam

Population (2011)
  - Total: 238,962

Languages
  - Official: Telugu
- Time zone: UTC+5:30 (IST)

Machilipatnam South mandal was formed by dividing Machilipatnam mandal on 8 May 2023.

== Towns and villages ==
The settlements in the mandal are listed below: Machilipatnam municipal corporation: Ward 20 to Ward 39

1. Bhogireddipalle
2. Gundupalem
3. Kona
4. Machilipatnam (R)
5. Nelakurru
6. Palletummalapalem
7. Pedayadara
8. Polatitippa
9. Rudravaram
10. Sultannagaram Gollapalem
