= Machilipatnam North mandal =

- Interactive map of Machilipatnam North mandal
- Location in Andhra Pradesh, India
- Coordinates: 16.17°N 81.13°E
- Country: India
- State: Andhra Pradesh
- District: Krishna
- Headquarters: Machilipatnam

Population (2011)
  - Total: 238,962

Languages
  - Official: Telugu
- Time zone: UTC+5:30 (IST)

Machilipatnam North mandal was formed by dividing Machilipatnam mandal on 8 May 2023.

== Towns and villages ==
The settlements in the mandal are listed below: Machilipatnam municipal corporation: Ward 1 to Ward 19, Ward 40 to Ward 50

1. Arisepalle
2. Borrapothupalem
3. Buddalapalem
4. Chilakalapudi (R)
5. Gokavaram
6. Gopuvanipalem
7. Hussainpalem
8. Kanuru
9. Karagraharam
10. Kothapudi
11. Machavaram (R)
12. Manginapudi
13. Pedapatnam
14. Pothepalle
15. Potlapalem
16. Tallapalem
17. Tavisipudi
