= Machilipatnam Urban Development Authority =

Agency overview
- Formed: 1 February 2016
- Type: Urban Planning Agency
- Jurisdiction: Government of Andhra Pradesh
- Headquarters: Machilipatnam; 16.17°N 81.13°E

The Machilipatnam Urban Development Authority (MUDA) is a special urban planning authority. It was constituted on 1 February 2016, under Andhra Pradesh Urban Areas (Development) Act 1975. The headquarters are located at Machilipatnam in the Krishna district of the Indian state of Andhra Pradesh.

== Jurisdiction ==
The MUDA covers a jurisdictional area of 426.16 km^{2} (164.54 sq mi) which includes, Machilipatnam Municipal Corporation, 27 villages from Machilipatnam mandal and a lone village from Pedana mandal.
