= Chinnapuram =

- Village
- Interactive map of Chinnapuram
- Location in Andhra Pradesh, India Chinnapuram (India)
- Coordinates: 16.1141°N 81.0506°E
- Country: India
- State: Andhra Pradesh
- District: Krishna

Area
  - Total: 11.96 km^{2} (4.62 sq mi)

Population (2011)
  - Total: 5,204
  - Density: 435.1/km^{2} (1,127/sq mi)

Languages
  - Official: Telugu
- Time zone: UTC+5:30 (IST)
- PIN: 521001
- Telephone code: +91–8672
- Vehicle registration: AP 16

Chinnapuram is a village in Krishna district of the Indian state of Andhra Pradesh. It is located in Machilipatnam mandal of Machilipatnam revenue division. It is 11 km from Machilipatnam, the district headquarters.

== Geography ==
The climate is tropical, with hot summers and moderate winters. The average warmest month is May.On average, the coolest month is January. The maximum average precipitation occurs in August. The peak temperature reaches 37 °C (99 °F) in May–June, while the winter temperature is 19-28 °C.

== See also ==
- List of villages in Krishna district
