= Werewolf (Dell Comics) =

- Cover to Werewolf #1.

Publication information
- Publisher: Dell Comics
- First appearance: Werewolf #1 (December 1966)

In-story information
- Alter ego: Major Wiley Wolf
- Team affiliations: formerly USAF, now CIA
- Abilities: master of disguise; surgically implanted miniature transmitter that allows him to secretly communicate with his highly trained pet wolf Thor; high-tech stealth suit is bulletproof and provides protection from chemicals and gases and allows him to breathe underwater and move at near-invisible speed.

Werewolf is a superhero/secret agent comic book series published by Dell Comics, loosely inspired by the 1941 film The Wolf Man. The book was part of a line of three superhero comics based on the Universal Monsters characters; the other two were Dracula and Frankenstein. Werewolf first appeared in Werewolf #1 (December 1966).

== Publication history ==
Werewolf lasted 3 issues from 1966 through 1967, numbering #1-3. Because "Wolfman" was a copyrighted name, Dell went with the more generic "Werewolf". Credit for the scripts is unclear, but they may have been written by Don Segall. Artwork for all three issues was provided by Bill Fracchio, with inks by Tony Tallarico.

== Fictional character biography ==
After crashing his experimental aircraft in the Arctic Circle, USAF pilot Major Wiley Wolf develops amnesia and goes feral, living with a group of wolves after saving one he names Thor, who from then on becomes his constant companion. Spending six months lost in the Canadian wilderness, he eventually gets his memory back, and after being rescued he resigns his Air Force commission, saying he has been changed by his experiences amongst his lupine friends and that he now realizes too many people are like the insane wolves who occasionally take over the pack and cause untold damage to the world around them and that he wants to help mankind somehow against these mad wolves in human form.

With most everyone who ever knew him believing him to be dead, he's recruited by the CIA along with the loyal Thor into the intelligence agency's Top Priority Unit One as its sole operative. Trained to the peak of physical perfection and instructed in the latest self defense and espionage techniques, he is given special hypnotic treatments that allow him to mentally alter his facial features to any number of preprogrammed "physiognomical disguises" with a minimum of make-up.

Then a miniaturized radio transmitter is surgically implanted in his throat that allows him to secretly communicate with the now highly trained Thor across great distances thanks to a similar receiver device implanted in the wolf's skull.

Finally, in addition to the usual James Bond-style gadgets, the CIA also provides Wolf with a one-of-a-kind high-tech stealth suit which is completely black and covers him from head to toe, making him resemble some eerie faceless shadow-like living silhouette. While the special polymer material it is made of is only a single molecule thick, the suit renders him virtually bulletproof and protects him from chemicals and gases with the mask containing a special oxygen extraction system that allows him to breathe underwater at any pressure depth. The suit's strangest feature, however, is its ability to make the soles of its feet friction-free, allowing him to "skate" across any surface at speeds so fast that, aided by the light absorptive qualities of his garb, he is virtually invisible (said soles can also take on adhesive qualities to aid in climbing).

Now code-named "Werewolf", the super-agent uses his special abilities to fight the enemies of freedom and democracy around the world, his top secret missions ranging from sabotaging missile bases in Cuba to battling the Red Chinese agent Sing Lo who has trained porpoises to spy on American submarines off the coast of Scotland.

When not on duty, Wiley relaxes with Thor in the secret solitude of his isolated mountaintop retreat which he leaves when summoned into action via a hidden underwater tunnel. His beautiful blond CIA contact is Judy Bowman.
