= Sal Trapani =

American comic book artist (1927–1999)

- Born: Salvatore A. Trapani; April 30, 1927 Brooklyn, New York, U.S.
- Died: July 14, 1999 (aged 72)
- Areas: Penciller, inker
- Notable works: Nukla

Detail by Trapani from Forbidden Worlds #144 (July 1967)

Salvatore A. "Sal" Trapani (April 30, 1927—July 14, 1999) was an American comic-book artist active from the 1940s Golden Age of comics through the 1960s Silver Age and into the 1980s. He is best known as a journeyman inker and occasional penciller for a variety of comics publishers.

== Biography ==
=== Early life and comics career ===
Sal Trapani was born in Brooklyn, New York City in 1927. He attended the School of Visual Arts and counted school co-founder Burne Hogarth among his early influences. His earliest recorded comic book credits include short filler pieces in Airboy Comics in 1949.

Through the following decades, Trapani racked up credits on hundreds of comic book stories for Gillmor, Charlton, Dell, Gold Key, ACG and others. His most notable credit is as co-creator of the character Nukla. Trapani replaced character co-creator Ramona Fradon for an extended run on the superhero title Metamorpho at DC Comics, beginning in 1966. Trapani also provided inks for many Steve Ditko-illustrated stories published by Charlton, ACG, and Dell, and regularly used Ditko as one of his many ghost artists.

Trapani was also a prolific inker for Marvel Comics in the 1970s, providing embellishments for The Incredible Hulk, The Defenders, Ghost Rider, Man-Thing, and many others. Trapani provided the inks on the Man-Thing story that first introduced Howard the Duck, in Adventure into Fear #19, written by Steve Gerber and pencilled by Val Mayerik.

=== Animation ===
Trapani also worked as a designer and storyboard artist for animated cartoons. In the 1960s he was employed by Cambria Productions in Los Angeles. From 1962 to 1964 he is credited as art director on 29 episodes of Cambria's Space Angel TV show. The famously low-budget animation process patented by Cambria was basically an animated comic strip with film of actors’ mouths speaking their lines superimposed over the still images. The images were largely created by cartoonist Alex Toth and inked by Trapani.

=== Involvement in Old Time Radio Fandom ===
Trapani was a lifelong enthusiast of the Golden Age of Radio and as a fan and collector of radio dramas he was instrumental in kickstarting the organized fandom for so-called Old Time Radio. He helped to organize one of the first OTR conventions and gifting 100 radio shows to convention organizer Jay Hickerson: "In 1970, at one of the parties, a guest told me of a friend, Sal Trapani, who had recordings of those radio shows, which intrigued me. I contacted Sal, and we subsequently met. After that initial meeting, Sal gave me 100 shows on 4-1/4 track reels. Thus, my collection of old-time radio shows began." According to brother-in-law Dick Giordano, Trapani also created a radio studio in his garage and produced programs with friends.
