= Dracula (Dell Comics) =

Superhero comic book series

- Cover to Issue #2.

Publication information
- Publisher: Dell Comics
- Format: Ongoing series
- Publication date: November 1966 – March 1967
- No. of issues: 3

Creative team
- Written by: Don Segall
- Artist: Tony Tallarico
- Penciller: Bill Fracchio

Dracula is a superhero comic book series published by Dell Comics, based on the literary and movie character Count Dracula. The book was part of a line of three superhero comics based on the Universal Monsters characters; the other two were Frankenstein and Werewolf.

== Publication history ==
Dracula lasted 3 issues from 1966 through 1967, numbered 2 through 4. (#1, published in 1962, was an adaptation of the 1931 film). In 1972–73, Dell reprinted the series, numbering them #6-8 (the reason for skipping issue #5 is unknown).

== Series background ==
Dracula is a modern-day direct descendant of the original Count Dracula now working as a medical researcher in the old family castle in Transylvania where, due to his experiments to develop a cure for brain damage using a serum developed from bat blood, he accidentally gains strange "vampire"-like powers, including the ability to turn into a bat and superhuman sight and hearing. He decides to embark on a superhero career in order to redeem his family name, developing his body through diet and exercise to the peak of physical perfection and designing himself his own distinctive crimson-cowled purple costume with a bat-shaped gold belt buckle, after which he vows to fight evil and superstition in all its forms.

Leaving for America after the local peasants burn down his castle, he adopts the secret identity of "Al U. Card" (a hastily chosen pseudonym short for "Aloyisius Ulysses Card"). In issue #4, his girlfriend and confidante, blond socialite B.B. Beebe, gains the same powers and became his blue-clad sidekick Fleeta (from "fledermaus", the German word for bat), bringing to the team not only a black belt in judo but also an abandoned hidden underground government radar installation/bomb shelter on her family's mountain estate that Dracula uses as his secret laboratory lair.

== Dracula's Oath ==
"I pledge by the strange powers which have become mine to fight against the injustice, corruption, evil and greed which fills this Earth in the hopes that somehow my example will be an example to all men."
