= Kona (surname) =

Kona is a Telugu surname. Notable people with the surname include:

- Neeraja Kona, South Indian costume designer
- Kona Prabhakar Rao (1916–1990), former governor of Maharashtra and Sikkim
- Kona Raghupathi, Indian politician
- Kona Venkat (born 1965), Indian film screenwriter, producer, director and actor
- Kona Srikar Bharat (born 1993), Indian cricketer

== See also ==
- Kona (disambiguation)
