= Perni Nani =

Indian politician

Minister of Transport, Information & Public Relations Government of Andhra Pradesh
- In office 8 June 2019 – 7 April 2022
- Governor: E. S. L. Narasimhan; Biswabhusan Harichandan
- Chief Minister: Y. S. Jagan Mohan Reddy
- Preceded by: Kinjarapu Atchannaidu (Transport); Kalava Srinivasulu (Information & Public Relations)
- Succeeded by: Pinipe Viswarup (Transport); C. S. Venugopala Krishna (Information & Public Relations)

Member of Legislative Assembly Andhra Pradesh
- In office 2019–2024
- Preceded by: Kollu Ravindra
- Succeeded by: Kollu Ravindra
- Constituency: Machilipatnam
- In office 2009–2014
- Preceded by: Constituency Established
- Succeeded by: Kollu Ravindra
- Constituency: Machilipatnam
- In office 2004–2008
- Preceded by: N. Narasimha Rao
- Succeeded by: Constituency Abolished
- Constituency: Bandar

Personal details
- Party: YSR Congress Party (2013–Present)
- Other political affiliations: Indian National Congress (1999 - 2013)
- Parent: Perni Krishnamurthy (father)

Perni Venkataramaiah, commonly known as Perni Nani, is an Indian politician from Krishna district, Andhra Pradesh. He is a former Member of the Legislative Assembly from Machilipatnam Assembly constituency to the Andhra Pradesh Legislative Assembly on behalf of YSR Congress Party. He is a former Minister for Transport, Information & Public Relations in the state of Andhra Pradesh.

== Early life ==
Perni Venkataramaiah was born to Perni Krishna Murthy and Nageswaramma. His father was a politician and former minister in the cabinet of N. Janardhana Reddy.

== Career ==
Perni Nani contested the 1999 elections on behalf of Indian National Congress. He was backed by N. Janardhana Reddy, former chief minister of Andhra Pradesh, but was opposed by Y. S. Rajasekhara Reddy, then leader of the Pradesh Congress Committee of the state. He lost the election to N. Narasimha Rao of Telugu Desam Party.

He later contested the 2004 elections and won against N. Narasimha Rao.

He contested the 2009 elections and won as an MLA. He served as the whip in Kiran Kumar Reddy's government. He aspired to serve in the cabinet as a minister of the state. However, it wasn't attained, neither during Rajasekhara Reddy's chief-ministership nor during N. Kiran Kumar Reddy's chief-ministership. Relented, he indicated at a public meeting held by Y. S. Jagan Mohan Reddy in August 2011 as part of Odarpu Yatra, that he might not be a member of Congress party by the time the next elections were due.

In January 2013, he quit Congress and joined Jagan Mohan Reddy's YSR Congress Party. In March, he voted against the government during a no-confidence motion, moved by Bharat Rashtra Samithi, thus defying the whip of Congress party. Subsequently, he was disqualified as the MLA on 8 June.

He unsuccessfully contested the 2014 elections on behalf of YSR Congress Party from Machilipatnam constituency and lost to Kollu Ravindra of Telugu Desam Party (TDP).

He contested the 2019 elections and won against the incumbent TDP MLA, Kollu Ravindra, from Machilipatnam Assembly constituency.

In June 2019, Chief Minister Y. S. Jagan Mohan Reddy inducted him into the cabinet ministry, assigning the ministries of Transport and Information & Public Relations. Perni Nani has served as the Minister for Transport and Information & Public Relations from June 2019 to 7 April 2022.
