= Rudravaram, Krishna district =

Rudravaram
- Village
- Interactive map of Rudravaram
- Location in Andhra Pradesh, India
- Country: India
- State: Andhra Pradesh
- District: Krishna district

Area
  - Total: 9.70 km^{2} (3.75 sq mi)

Population (2011)
  - Total: 1,779
  - Density: 183/km^{2} (475/sq mi)

Languages
  - Official: Telugu
- Time zone: UTC+5:30 (IST)
- Vehicle registration: AP

Rudravaram is a village in Machilipatnam mandal, Krishna district of the Indian state of Andhra Pradesh. The waste-to-energy plant was planned to be set up at the village for producing energy from the waste produce of Machilipatnam Municipality.

== See also ==
- List of villages in Krishna district
