= 1864 Machilipatnam cyclone =

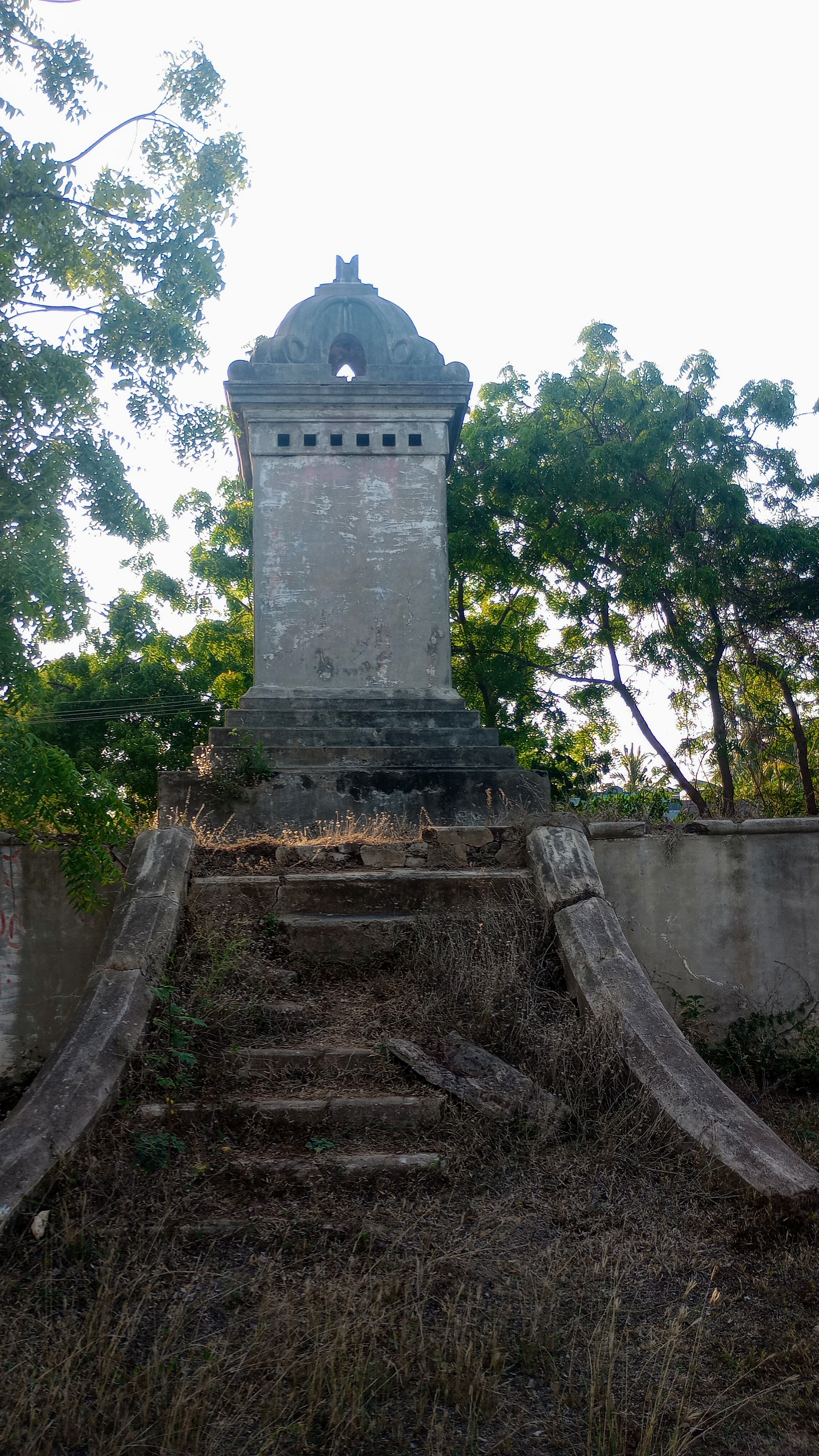
1864 Machilipatnam Cyclone Memorial

A tropical cyclone hit the coastal town of Machilipatnam (Masulipatam in old records) on 1 November 1864 causing heavy casualties and damaging properties. A memorial was erected in Machilipatnam to the memory of an estimated 30000 deaths.

== History ==
During October 1864, a tropical cyclone impacted Kolkata leading to loss of life and properties. Few weeks later on 1 November, another severe cyclone impacted Machilipatnam. The day started with overcast skies and by afternoon it started raining and wind picked speed. Coinciding with the high tides resulted in a 13-foot high storm surge that went 17 miles inland devastating everything on its path while receding as well. Eye-witness accounts of the night describe the cyclone impact in detail during and after the impact.

== Impact ==
The village of Gilakaladindi and the English/Dutch fort were heavily impacted that resulted in an estimated death of 30,000 people. The impact was felt up to Vijayawada and Guntur leading to loss of lives. After hearing the news of the disaster, the Madras presidency sent rescue boats with relief aid and medical personnel. A vessel named Arabia sent from Madras reached Masulipatam port on 17 November and returned with some of the surviving European and East Indian Company personnel.

The East India government started the 'Masulipatam Relief Fund' in order to aid the rescue and rehabilitation efforts of the people impacted by the cyclone. An official report from the health officer mentioned how the inroads of sea water contaminated fresh water wells that triggered diarrhea and fevers. Further the disaster made agriculture lands uncultivable for years and destroyed the vegetation. Queen of England in her parliament opening speech in 1865 made a mention about the cyclones.

This cyclone along with the 1864 Calcutta cyclone prompted the British East Indian Company to develop a cyclone warning system in India.

== Memorial ==
Manuel Fruvall who lost his brothers' family in the disaster and Thornhill, the then district magistrate of Machilipatnam built a memorial to commemorate the disaster and the loss of lives. This memorial is inside the Catholic burial ground close to Bandar kota in Machilipatnam and as of 2024, it is in dilapidated state.

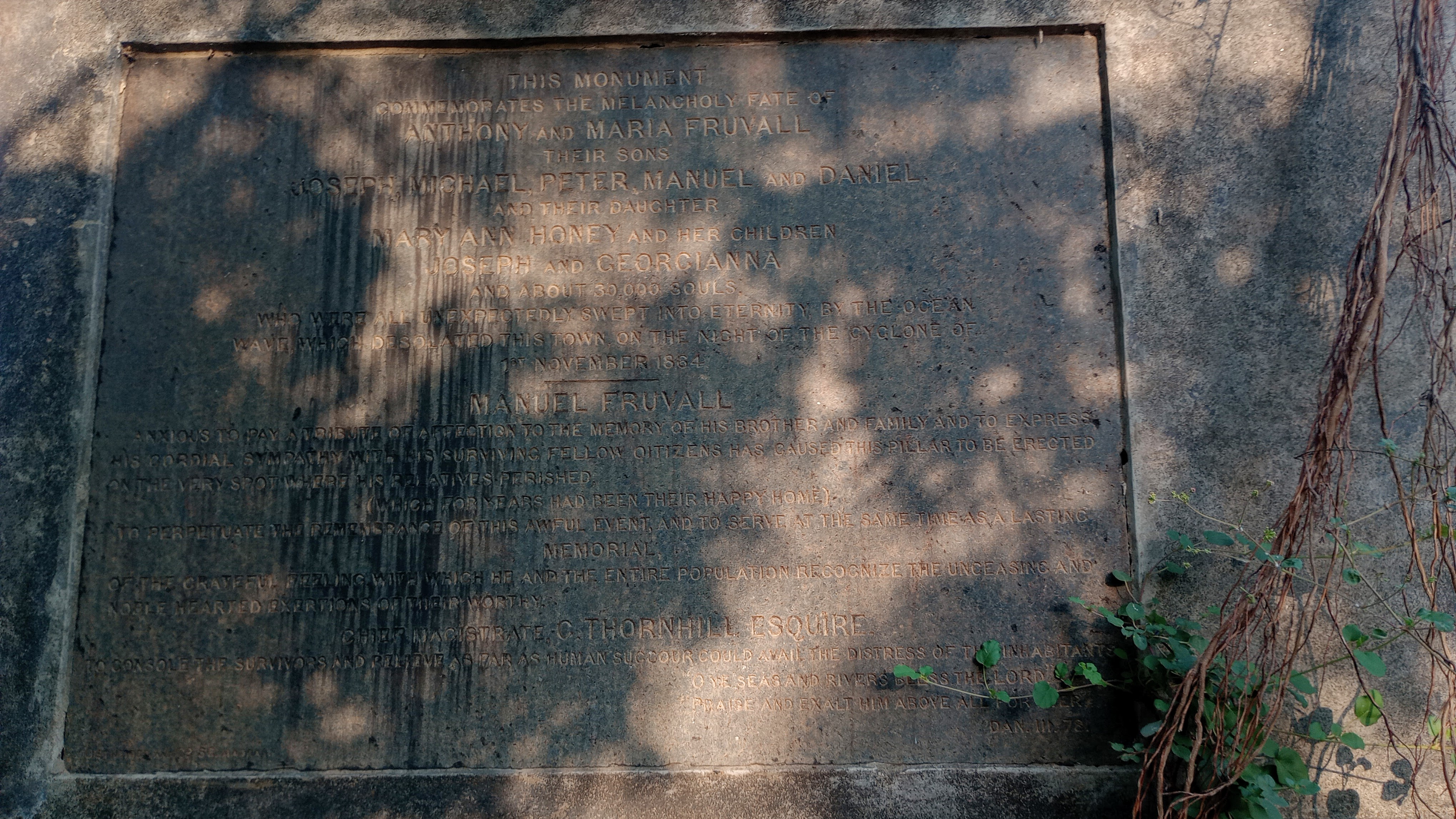
1864 Machilipatnam Cyclone Memorial Inscription
