= Pedapatnamlanka =

Pedapatnam Lanka
- Village
- Interactive map of Pedapatnam Lanka
- Location in Andhra Pradesh, India Pedapatnam Lanka (India)
- Coordinates: 16.546°N 81.934°E
- Country: India
- State: Andhra Pradesh
- District: Konaseema

Languages
  - Official: Telugu
- Time zone: UTC+5:30 (IST)

Pedapatnam lanka is a village in Mamidikuduru Mandal in Andhra Pradesh.

== See also ==
- Machilipatnam mandal
