= Helen Honig Meyer =

Helen H. Meyer
- Born: Helen Honig; 1907; New York City, U.S.
- Died: April 2003 (aged 95); Livingston, New Jersey, U.S.
- Occupation: Publisher
- Known for: Dell Publishing, Dell Comics

Helen Honig Meyer (1907–2003) was the president of Dell Publishing from the 1950s until 1976. Meyer began working at Dell Publishing only two years after its creation, and was influential in building up both the traditional book publishing arm and the popular Dell Comics imprint. As the first woman to head a major American publishing house, Meyer inspired many other women who were breaking into publishing in the forties and fifties, and more generally shaped American publishing through her leadership of Dell.

== Biography ==
=== Early life and career ===
Meyer was born Helen Honig in 1907 to a family in Brooklyn. After working at Popular Science and McCall's magazines, she joined Dell Publishing as a clerk in 1923, aged 16. While Dell Publishing initially focused on pulp magazines, Meyer pushed an expansion to paperbacks and comic books. Meyer then further expanded Dell Publishing into hardcover books with Delacorte Press, and signed authors such as Kurt Vonnegut and James Baldwin. Throughout her time at Dell Publishing, Meyer worked closely with its founder, George Delacorte. Referencing Meyer in a 1980s interview, Delacorte said, "I'm a great believer in hiring women. If you hire a capable man and your competitors know about it, they will start propositioning him. Women are more loyal."

=== Dell Comics ===
Meyer was asked to head the Dell Comics imprint by Delacorte, and became a driving force in the imprint's success. Through its use of licensed characters and family-friendly stories, Dell Comics became the world's largest comics publisher by 1953. In particular, Meyer spearheaded the licensing of Disney characters and directly selected material for publication, including Lobo, the first comic series with an African-American headlining character. In 1954, Meyer testified before the US Senate on juvenile delinquency and their relation to comics. At the time, Meyer claimed that Dell Comics was publishing 15% of America's comics, while making a third of America's comic sales. In her testimony, Meyer went strongly on the offensive against Dr. Fredric Wertham's accusation that comic book violence was corrupting America's youth. Besides questioning Wertham's agenda and fact-checking ability, Meyer also argued that Dell Comics were wholesome and family friendly; specifically, that "Dell comics are good comics." This became a slogan for Dell Comics, as well as part of their broader marketing strategy. Despite Dell Comics' association with 'wholesomeness,' Meyer refused association with the Comics Code, probably because it would have put Dell Comics in an alliance with its competitors. Instead, Dell Comics focused on a personalized campaign relying on Meyer's 'good comics' slogan.

=== Later life ===
Dell Publishing was sold to Doubleday & Co in 1976. After the sale, Meyer worked as a consultant for Doubleday until 1982, and then worked as a literary agent at Foreign Rights Inc. James Clavell was one of her most prominent clients, and in 1986 Meyer obtained a $5 million advance for Clavell. Meyer was inducted into the Publishers Hall of Fame in 1986. Meyer died in 2003, aged 95, in Livinston, New Jersey.

== Family ==
Helen Meyer was married to Abraham J. Meyer for 64 years, until his death in 1993. They had two children: Dr. Adele Brodkin and Robert Meyer. At the time of Meyer's death in 2003, she had six grandchildren and four great-grandchildren.
