= Brain Boy =

American superhero comic

Brain Boy was a short-lived superhero comic, created by Herb Castle and artist Gil Kane, published by Dell Comics in 1962 and 1963.

== Fictional character biography ==
Brain Boy was Matt Price. When his mother was still pregnant with him, a car accident with an electrical tower killed his father and gave Matt mental powers. These powers included telepathy, levitation, and the ability to control minds. After graduating from high school, Matt is recruited by another telepath to work for a secret government agency fighting against communists and other "enemies of freedom" using their own telepathic agents against the West. "Brain Boy" was just Matt's nickname, and he never wore a costume.

== Publication history ==
The first issue was Four Color Comics #1330 in 1962, followed by Brain Boy #2. The last issue was #6 in 1963. Frank Springer took over the artwork for the spin-off series.

== Other versions ==
Brain Boy was mentioned, along with other superheroes such as Black Cat and the Golden Age Crimson Avenger, in Alan Moore's The League of Extraordinary Gentlemen: Black Dossier.

Dark Horse Comics released a hardcover archive collection at the end of 2011. Dark Horse Comics rebooted the character for their superhero line, along with Captain Midnight, Catalyst, and X. The series is written by Fred Van Lente, with art by R. B. Silva, Rob Lean, Ego, and cover art by Ariel Olivetti. The first issue was published on September 11, 2013.
