= Manginapudi =

- Village
- Interactive map of Manginapudi
- Location in Andhra Pradesh, India Manginapudi (India)
- Coordinates: 16.2262°N 81.2044°E
- Country: India
- State: Andhra Pradesh
- District: Krishna
- Mandal: Machilipatnam

Area
  - Total: 6.03 km^{2} (2.33 sq mi)

Population (2011)
  - Total: 2,138
  - Density: 355/km^{2} (918/sq mi)

Languages
  - Official: Telugu
- Time zone: UTC+5:30 (IST)

Manginapudi is a village in Krishna district of the Indian state of Andhra Pradesh. It is located on the coast of Bay of Bengal in Machilipatnam mandal of Machilipatnam revenue division. Manginapudi Beach lies on the coast of the village which is a tourist destination and is maintained by the state tourism department, APTDC.
