= Manginapudi Beach =

Beach in Andhra Pradesh, India

- Beach
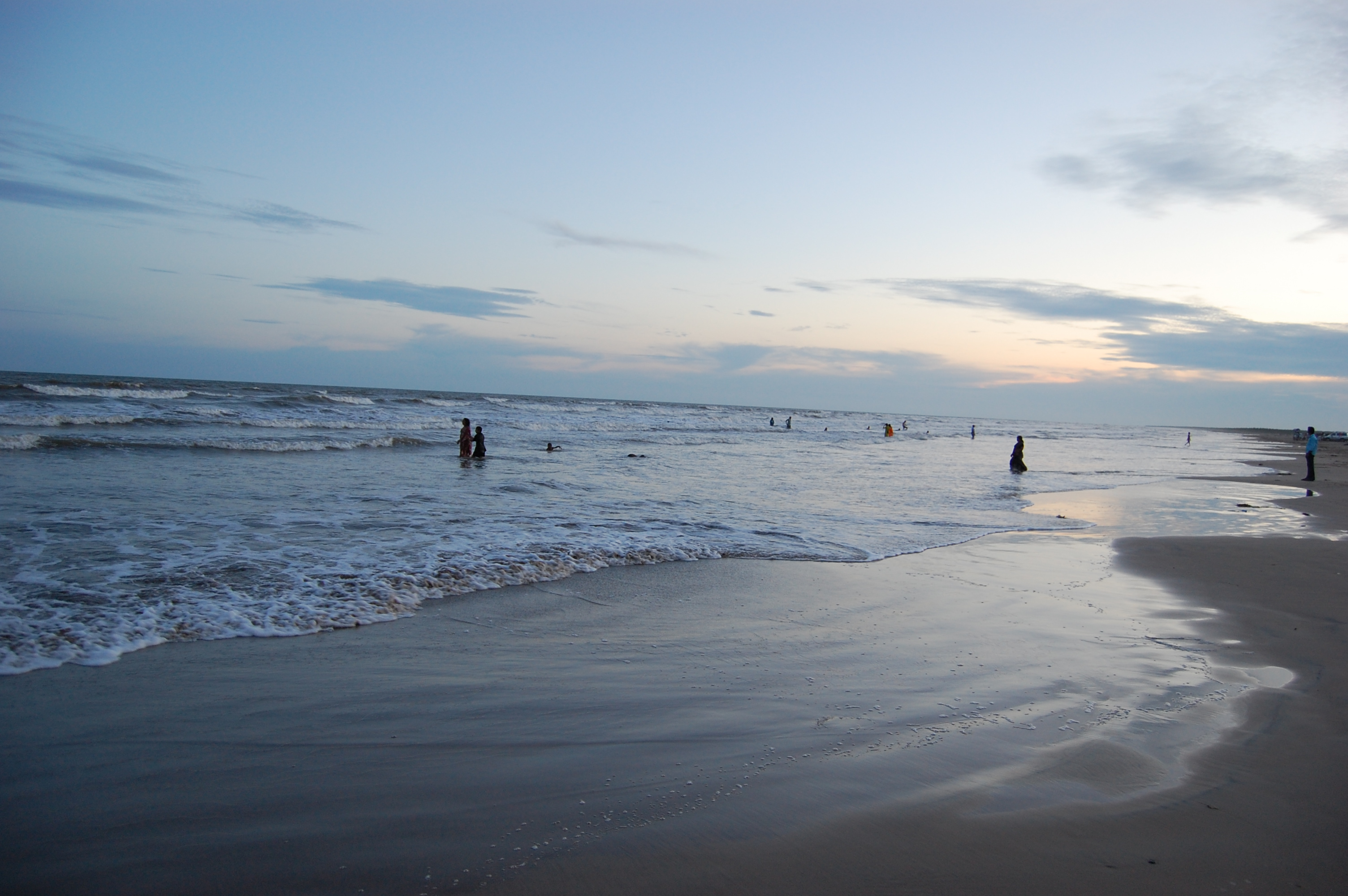
- Manginapudi beach near Machilipatnam

- Coordinates: 16.244829°N 81.2375879°E
- Location: Manginapudi, Krishna district, Andhra Pradesh, India

Manginapudi Beach is located on the coast of Bay of Bengal, at a distance of 11 km (6.8 mi) from Machilipatnam of the Indian state of Andhra Pradesh. The beach is maintained by the state tourism board, APTDC.

== See also ==
- List of beaches in India
