= Cona =

Cona may refer to:

== Places ==
- Cona, Veneto, a town and comune in Venice, Italy
- Cona (Teramo), a quarter of Teramo, Italy
- Cona Creek, Queensland, a locality and creek in Queensland, Australia
- Tsona, also known as Cona, a county-level city in Shannan Prefecture, Tibet, China
- Cona, a populated place in the Tibet Autonomous Region
- Cona Lake, Tibet

== People ==
- Fernandino Cona (1882–unknown), Italian general during World War II
- Pascual Coña (late 1840s–1927), Chilean man who narrated Mapuche customs

== Groups, companies, organizations ==
- College of the North Atlantic (CONA, CNA), Newfoundland and Labrador, Canada; a college network
- Conference on National Affairs, a program operated by the YMCA Youth and Government program
- Cultural Objects Name Authority, a project of the Getty Research Institute

== Other uses ==
- Cona, a vacuum coffee maker designed by Abram Games
- ConA, Concanavalin A, a lectin protein

== See also ==
- Conna
- Kona (disambiguation)
