= Lobo (Dell Comics) =

Dell Comics character

- Lobo #1 (Dec. 1965), the first comic book with an African-American star; cover art by Tony Tallarico.

Publication information
- Publisher: Dell Comics
- First appearance: Lobo #1 (Dec. 1965)
- Created by: Don "D. J." Arneson; Tony Tallarico

In-story information
- Abilities: Excellent marksman

Lobo is a fictional Western comic book hero who is the medium's first African-American character to headline his own series.

== Publication history ==
Lobo is recognized as the first African-American character to headline his own comic book series, but he was preceded by another Western hero in the comic strip medium : The Chisholm Kid, a newspaper strip illustrated by Carl Pfeufer. The strip was launched as part of a new color comics section for the Pittsburgh Courier, which debuted on August 19, 1950. This color comics section was produced by the Smith-Mann Syndicate and was published exclusively in the Pittsburgh Courier, one of the largest Black newspapers in the country at the time.. The Chisholm Kid ran in the Courier from August 19, 1950, to August 11, 1956.

Lobo starred in Dell Comics' little-known, two-issue series Lobo (Dec. 1965 & Sept. 1966), also listed as Dell Comics #12-439-512 and #12-439-610 in the company's quirky numbering system. Created by Dell editor and writer Don "D. J." Arneson and artist Tony Tallarico, it chronicled the Old West adventures of a wealthy, unnamed African-American gunslinger called "Lobo" by the first issue's antagonists. On the foreheads of vanquished criminals, Lobo would leave the calling card of a gold coin imprinted with the images of a wolf and the letter "L".

Tallarico in a 2006 interview said that he and Arneson co-created the character based on an idea and a plot by Tallarico, with Arneson scripting it:

I had an idea for Lobo. And I approached D. J. Arneson and he brought it in and showed it to [Dell editor-in-chief] Helen Meyer. ... She loved it. She really wanted to do it. Great, so we did it. We did the first issue. And in comics, you start the second issue as they're printing the first one, due to time limitations. ... All of the sudden, they stopped the wagon. They stopped production on the issue. They discovered that as they were sending out bundles of comics out to the distributors [that] they were being returned unopened. And I couldn't figure out why. So they sniffed around, scouted around and discovered [that many sellers] were opposed to Lobo, who was the first black Western hero. That was the end of the book. It sold nothing. They printed 200,000; that was the going print-rate. They sold, oh, 10–15 thousand.

Arneson, in a 2010 interview, disputed this version of Lobo's creation:

Tony Tallarico illustrated Lobo. He did not create the character, I did. He did not plot the storyline, I did. He did not write the script, I did. And he did not approach me with the original concept or idea. ... I developed the original premise for Lobo (originally Black Lobo, a title Helen Meyer rejected as inappropriate at the time...) from the book The Negro Cowboys by Philip Durham and Everett L. Jones.... On reading the book in 1965, I recognized the potential for a black comic book hero based on historical fact.... I added other elements to the original Black Lobo character concept, e.g.: Robin Hood, the Lone Ranger, etc., as well as the familiar adventurous spirit of the American cowboy of popular Western novels and cowboy movies of that time.... Tony illustrated a mock-up cover ... which was presented to Helen Meyer along with the proposal I wrote.... I then wrote the script and Tony Illustrated the comic book from my script. ... I have no idea on what information or source ... Tony based his explanation for the discontinuation of Lobo. Sales were the primary basis for the continuation or discontinuation of a series title. I neither have now nor did I have at that time any intimation or suggestion that Lobo was discontinued because anyone was somehow conspiratorially "opposed" to it.

== Later appearances ==
Lobo was revived in 2017 in InDELLible Comics’ All-New Popular Comics #1.

In 2018, a Lobo novella was published in a collection entitled, Fantastic 4N1, written by author, David Noe.

== Awards ==
In May 2006, Tallarico was bestowed the East Coast Black Age of Comics Convention's Pioneer Award for Lifetime Achievement, in recognition of his work on the first comic book to star an African-American. He was an honoree at the reception dinner at the African American Museum in Philadelphia, Pennsylvania.

== See also ==
- African characters in comics
- List of African-American firsts
