= Tony Tallarico =

American comic artist (1933–2022)

- Born: Anthony F. Tallarico; September 20, 1933 Brooklyn, New York, U.S.
- Died: January 6, 2022 (aged 88) South Setauket, New York, U.S.
- Areas: Cartoonist, Inker
- Pseudonyms: Tony Williamson; Tony Williamsune
- Notable works: Lobo
- Awards: East Coast Black Age of Comics Convention's Pioneer Award, 2006

Anthony F. Tallarico (September 20, 1933 – January 6, 2022) was an American comic book artist, and children's book illustrator and author. Often paired in a team with his generally uncredited penciler, Bill Fraccio, Tallarico drew primarily for Charlton Comics and Dell Comics, including, for the latter, the comic book Lobo, an early comic book starring an African-American.

== Biography ==
=== Early life and career ===
Tony Tallarico was born in Brooklyn, New York on September 20, 1933, and attended New York City's School of Industrial Art, the Brooklyn Museum Art School, and the School of Visual Arts. He got his start in comics in 1953, penciling and self-inking stories for such publishers as Charlton Comics, Trojan, and the David C. Cook Publishing Company, for which he contributed to a newspaper Sunday-supplement comic book similar to "The Spirit Section".

=== The Silver Age ===
In 1961, Tallarico illustrated the Gilberton Company's Classics Illustrated #160, its adaptation of H. G. Wells' The Food of the Gods; Classics Illustrated Junior #571, "How Fire Came to the Indians"; and Classics Illustrated Junior #574, the European folk tale "Brightboots". He also drew individual chapters in several issues in Gilberton's World Around Us series. At the end of the decade, Tallarico supplied second painted covers for reprints of Classics Illustrated #81, Homer's The Odyssey, and #96, historian John Bakeless' Daniel Boone: Master of the Wilderness.

Lobo #1 (Dec. 1965), the first known comic book to star an African-American. Art by Tallarico.

He drew the sole two issues of Lobo (Dec. 1965 & Sept. 1966) — also listed as Dell Comics #12-438-512 and #12-439-610 in publisher Dell Comics' quirky numbering system — the first known comic book to star an African-American. This Western series, scripted by Don Arneson, chronicled the adventures of a wealthy, unnamed African-American gunslinger hero, called "Lobo" by the first issue's antagonists. Tallarico and Arneson dispute who originally conceived the character.

A single-issue, small-press comic book in 1947, All-Negro Comics, was an omnibus featuring a black detective, a black adventurer and others in separate features. Likewise, while Marvel Comics' 1950s predecessor Atlas Comics had included the feature "Waku, Prince of the Bantu" — starring an African chieftain in Africa, with no regularly featured Caucasian characters — as one of four features in the omnibus series Jungle Tales (Sept. 1954 – Sept. 1955). On August 19, 1950, the Pittsburgh Courier launched a new color comic section, for which the Smith-Mann Syndicate supplied several strips featuring Black characters. These included Neil Knight, the first Black astronaut and space adventurer in a comic strip, illustrated by Carl Pfeufer; Guy Fortune, the first Black secret agent in a comic strip, written by Edd Ashe; Mark Hunt, the first Black private detective in a comic strip, also written by Edd Ashe; and the Western The Chisholm Kid, first Western comic strip with a Black cowboy as the protagonist, illustrated by Carl Pfeufer. Aside from Lobo, there would be no black title star of a comic until Luke Cage, Hero for Hire (June 1972), though black supporting characters such as the Black Panther and the Falcon were introduced in the interim.

Tallarico drew the one-shot "Great Society Comic Book" (1966), which portrayed President Lyndon B. Johnson and other Democrats as superheroes, fighting against evil conservatives. He was involved with the follow-up comic, "Bobman and Teddy", starring Robert and Ted Kennedy as a Batman-and-Robin-like dynamic duo.

Under the joint pseudonym Tony Williamson and, later, Tony Williamsune, Tallarico and his generally uncredited penciler, Bill Fraccio, collaborated on many stories for Warren Publishing's horror-comics magazines Creepy, Eerie and Vampirella.

Tallarico's work includes issues of the Charlton superhero comic Blue Beetle and its TV tie-in and teen idol comics Bewitched and Bobby Sherman. He also drew Dell's 1966–1967 Frankenstein and Dracula superhero series and Harvey Comics' short-lived superhero title Jigsaw. His last recorded work in the comic book field is the story "Double Occupancy" in Charlton's Ghost Manor #15 (Oct. 1973).

=== Later career ===
In the 1970s, Tallarico began writing/illustrating children's books for such publishers as Fitzgerald Publishing, Kidsbooks, Tuffy Books, Modern, Simon & Schuster, Price Stern Sloan, Treasure Books, Concordia Publishing House, Putnam, and Little Simon. Still active as of the mid-2000s, Tallarico by his counts has created more than 1,000 children's books, including the Where Are They? series.

== Personal life and death ==
Tallarico was married to a writer, Elvira, for over 44 years. They had two children, Nina Reyes and Tony John Tallarico. He died on January 6, 2022, at the age of 88.

== Awards ==
On May 19, 2006, Tallarico was bestowed the East Coast Black Age of Comics Convention's Pioneer Award for Lifetime Achievement, in recognition of his creating the first comic book to star an African-American. He was an honoree at the reception dinner at the African American Museum in Philadelphia, Pennsylvania.

== See also ==
- List of African-American firsts
