= Nukla =

Publication information
- Publisher: Dell Comics
- First appearance: Nukla #1 (October–December 1965)
- Created by: Joe Gill; Sal Trapani

In-story information
- Alter ego: Matthew Gibbs
- Place of origin: Earth
- Team affiliations: CIA
- Notable aliases: Leapfrog (code name)
- Abilities: Can will body to become invisible and immaterial and in phantom form fire energy bolts that cause nuclear explosions, fly at the speed of light and quickly regenerate from injuries

Nukla is a fictional character published by Dell Comics in the mid-1960s. He was created by writer Joe Gill and artist Sal Trapani (with uncredited assistance from others artists, including Dick Giordano). The character made his debut in Nukla #1 (October–December 1965).

== Fictional character background ==
Nukla is really Matthew Gibbs, a CIA spy and pilot. While flying his U-2 spy plane over Communist China, he is fired on by the Chinese Red Army. Unable to evade the missiles, he and his aircraft are vaporised in the resulting nuclear explosion. For an unexplained reason, he is able to maintain his human consciousness in this atomized state and reform himself through sheer force of will, now possessing incredible nuclear powers. His secret known only to his section chief Jim Clarke, Nukla used his atomic abilities to fight the enemies of the United States, like supervillains Baron Von Zee and Captain Whale.

== Powers and abilities ==
Nukla has nuclear-based powers, somewhat similar to those of Captain Atom. He can will himself into an invisible immaterial state and in said phantom form fire destructive bolts of pure "radiation-free" atomic energy from his hands and fly at the speed of light as well as quickly heal himself of any injuries received in his mortal flesh and blood form. He must be careful, though, not to deplete his energy and take time to recharge his "nuclear batteries" or he will not be able to transform, and extreme cold makes it impossible for him to dematerialize.

He is also able to dematerialize and rematerialize his U-2 when needed, flying it both to conserve his vast powers for when they are needed and also simply because he still enjoys being a pilot.

== Publication history ==
Nukla ran for only four issues. Steve Ditko, artist of Captain Atom, did the artwork for the last issue.

=== Issues ===
- Nukla #1 (October–December 1965)
- Nukla #2 (March 1966)
- Nukla #3 (June 1966)
- Nukla #4 (September 1966)
