= Frankenstein (Dell Comics) =

Fictional character by Dell Comics

The superhero Frankenstein makes his first appearance. From Frankenstein #2.

Frankenstein is a superhero comic book series published by Dell Comics, based on the literary and movie character Frankenstein's monster. The book was part of a line of three superhero comics based on the Universal Monsters characters; the other two were Dracula and Werewolf.

Frankenstein lasted three issues, numbered 2-4 (Sept. 1966- March 1967). Issue #1 was a 1964 adaptation of the 1931 film. Art was by Tony Tallarico and Bill Fracchio.

== Fictional biography ==
Created in 1866 by a reclusive scientist referred to only as "the Doctor" who endowed him with a superior intellect and the strength of fifty men, Frankenstein lay dormant for over a hundred years under the ruins of an abandoned castle near the large modern American metropolis of Metropole City. Upon awakening thanks to a convenient lightning bolt, he dons a lifelike rubber mask to hide the fact that his white-haired and black-browed head has pale green skin (the rest of his tall, muscular body has a Caucasian flesh tone) and takes the name "Frank Stone", a pseudonym inspired by a fallen chunk of masonry with the word "FRANK" engraved in it.

Befriending elderly millionaire philanthropist Henry Knickerbocker after rescuing him from a traffic accident (and who, by an amazing coincidence, is the son of a man who had been his long-dead creator's friend and business partner), when the old man dies from a heart attack he leaves his "nephew" Frank his vast fortune, allowing him the financial freedom to devotes his life to being a scarlet-suited superhero.

Only his butler William knows his secret, although neighboring blond busybody (and journalist) Miss Ann Thrope suspects that Frank Stone is really the secret identity of Frankenstein and is constantly trying to prove it. His archenemy is the "Mini-Me"-like mad scientist Mr. Freek who is seen riding on the shoulders of his pet gorilla Bruto. Another enemy was a sentient computer that brainwashed Frankenstein by turning him into a super-criminal. He only broke out of his trance when his butler William hit him over the head with a large spanner.

The series was lampooned by Big Bang Comics with their own superhero character, Super Frankenstein.
