= Divi Gopalacharlu =

Ayurvedic scholar

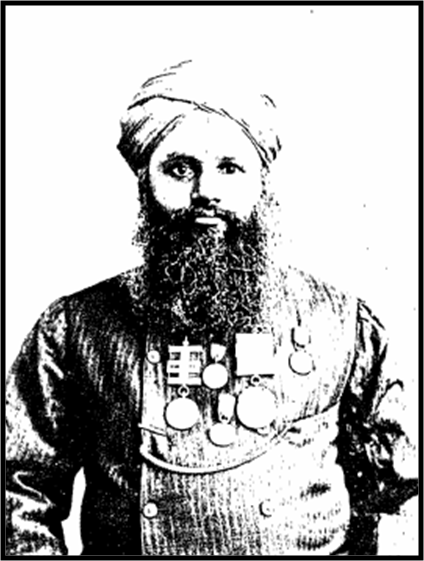
Divi Gopalacharlu (1872–1920)

Divi Gopalacharlu (October 10, 1872 - September 29, 1920) was a medical scientist, Hindu orthodox researcher, Ayurvedic scholar and president of the All India Ayurvedic Vidyapeeth. In medicine he was credited with the titles Vaidyaratna, Ayurveda Marthanda Bhishmagrani. He was known for Ayurvedic medicine and also preoccupied with propagating Ayurveda across the country and striving for extensive surveillance. He addressed various national conferences and activities.

He was a Vaishnava Brahmin of an ancient and highly successful family of physicians, both on the maternal and paternal sides. He was born in 1872 in Machilipatnam in Andhra Pradesh. In the 1890s, he studied at the Maharajah's Ayurveda Oriental School at Mysore. Soon after his formal training, he was appointed as Physician in-charge at the Theosophical Society's Vaidyasala in Bangalore. Gopalacharulu pioneered the modernization of Ayurveda in South India by concentrating on the systematization of knowledge as contained in the ancient works on Ayurveda and also on institutionalizing this ancient practice of medicine. His major achievements include the creation and manufacture of two botanical remedies, Haimadi Panakam and Satadhouta Ghritam' - the cure for the plague in Mysore.

He started his career as the Chief Physician of the Kanyaka Parameswari Charities free dispensary and was instrumental in starting the Madras Ayurveda Laboratories and the Ayurvedic College at Madras. Despite the deep-rooted hatred of the British against the oriental medical systems, Gopalcharlu practiced Ayurveda. He earned laurels from home and abroad for his outstanding contributions to the Ayurvedic medicine.

Goplacharlu donated large sums of money to promote Ayurveda at Government Ayurveda Colleges in Mysore and Madras.

== Awards ==
He has won gold medals and first-class certificates at the exhibitions held in Bombay, Calcutta, madras and several other places. The title of "Bhishangmani" was conferred on him by an Assembly of Ayurvedic physicians of Calcutta, 1907; the title of “Ayurveda Marthanda”, by the Skhila Bharata Varshiva Sri Savaji Ayurvedic Vidya Bitta of Nasik, 1907. He is a Fellow of the Ayurvedic University of Nasik; Examiner of Mysore Ayurvedic Vidwat Examinations, Commentator of Susrutha Samhita and Madhana Nihana. Address: No. 44, Acharappan Street, Georgetown, Madras, India.

== Books ==
- Ayurvedic Medicines Prepared by Ayurveda Marthanda Bhishangmani Pandit D. Gopalacharlu at the Madras Ayurvedic Laboratory, with an Historical Sketch of Ayurveda.
- Ayurvedanga Salya tantramu (1914).
- HINDU MEDICINE AN ADDRESS Delivered at the Hindu University Foundation Ceremony at Benares. (Translation in Telugu) - 1916
- BESHAJAKALPA Treatise on the Technology of the Ayurvedic Science BY VENKATACHARYULU - Telugu translation.
