= Kona =

Kona or KONA may refer to:

== People ==
- Kona (surname)
- Dilshad Nahar Kona, Bangladeshi singer also known as Kona

=== Fictional characters ===
- Kona, Monarch of Monster Isle, a 1960s comic book character

== Places ==
- Kona District, Hawaii, US; on the western coast of the island of Hawaiʻi. Kona means "Leeward" in Hawaiian. In Ancient Hawaii each island had a "Kona" district.
- Kailua-Kona, Hawaii, US; sometimes called Kona Town
- Kona, Kentucky, US
- Kona, North Carolina, US
- Kona Department, a department in Mouhoun Province, Burkina Faso
- Kona, Ashanti, a small town in the Sekyere South District, Ghana
- Alternative spelling of Konah, a town in Guinea
- Kona, a city of Howrah district in West Bengal, India
- Colossae or Kona, an ancient city of Phrygia

=== Facilities and structures ===
- Kona International Airport in Kailua-Kona, Hawaiʻi, US
- Kona Skatepark in Jacksonville, Florida, US
- Winona Municipal Airport (ICAO airport code KONA), Minnesota, US

== Broadcast callsigns ==
- KONA (AM), a radio station in Kennewick, Washington
- KONA-FM, a radio station in Kennewick, Washington
- KONA-LP, a low-power radio station (100.5 FM) licensed to serve Kailua-Kona, Hawaii, United States

== Arts and entertainment ==
- Kona (TV series), a Kenyan telenovela that premiered in 2013
- Kona (video game), a 2017 video game developed by Parabole

=== Music ===
- Kona (lit. woman in Icelandic) a 1985 solo album by Icelandic singer Bubbi
- "Kona", 2018 single from the album Limpopo Champions League by South African musician Sho Madjozi
- "So Kona", a 2007 song by Moka Only from the album Vermilion

== Groups, organizations, companies ==
- Signal Intelligence Regiment (KONA), German Signal intelligence regiment (abbr. KONA), during World War II
- Kona Brewing Company
- Kona Grill, a restaurant chain based in Scottsdale, Arizona
- Kona Bicycle Company

== Brands, products ==
- An open-source implementation of the K programming language
- Kyocera Kona, a flip phone manufactured by Kyocera
- Hyundai Kona, a crossover SUV automotive vehicle
- Kona Ice, mobile shaved ice company

== Other ==
- Kona coffee, a product of the Kona District in Hawaiʻi
- Kona storm, a weather event in Hawaiʻi

== See also ==
- Cona (disambiguation)
- Ironman World Championship, a triathlon held in the Kona District of Hawaiʻi
- Kona Town, an album by the band Pepper
- Konna, a town in Mali
