= Kollu Ravindra =

Indian politician

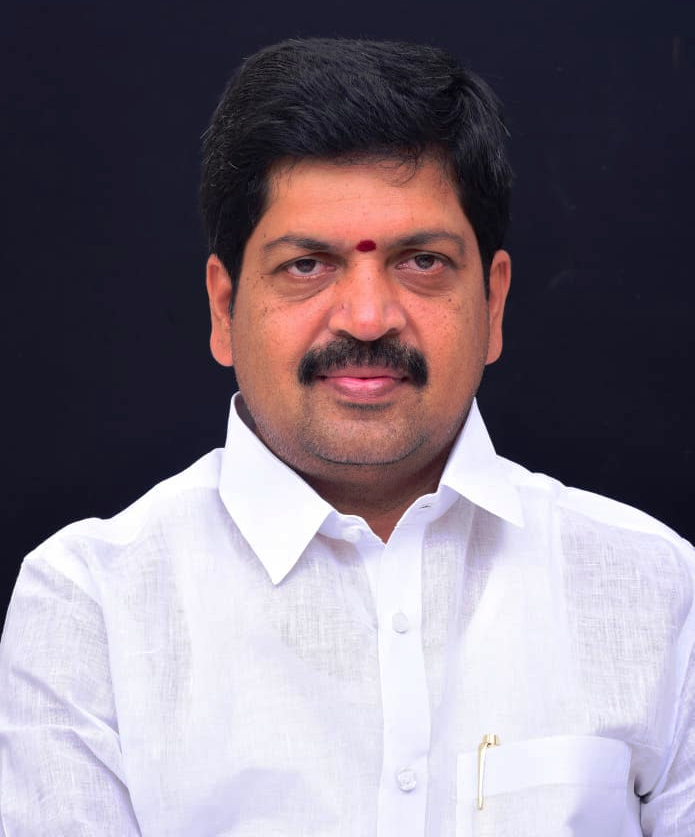

Minister of Mines and Geology Government of Andhra Pradesh
- Incumbent
- Assumed office 12 June 2024
- Governor: S. Abdul Nazeer
- Chief Minister: Nara Chandrababu Naidu
- Preceded by: Peddireddy Ramachandra Reddy

Minister of Excise Government of Andhra Pradesh
- Incumbent
- Assumed office 12 June 2024
- Governor: S. Abdul Nazeer
- Chief Minister: Nara Chandrababu Naidu
- Preceded by: Kalattur Narayana Swamy

Minister for Law & Justice Government of Andhra Pradesh
- In office 8 June 2014 – 29 May 2019
- Governor: E. S. L. Narasimhan
- Chief Minister: Nara Chandrababu Naidu
- Preceded by: Palle Raghunatha Reddy
- Succeeded by: Buggana Rajendranath Reddy

Minister for Skill development, Youth & Sports Government of Andhra Pradesh
- In office 8 June 2014 – 29 May 2019
- Governor: E. S. L. Narasimhan
- Chief Minister: N. Chandrababu Naidu
- Preceded by: President's Rule
- Succeeded by: Buggana Rajendranath Reddy (Skill Development); Muttamsetti Srinivasa Rao (Youth & Sports)

Minister for Employment, NRI Empowerment and Relations Government of Andhra Pradesh
- In office 8 June 2014 – 29 May 2019
- Governor: E. S. L. Narasimhan
- Chief Minister: N. Chandrababu Naidu
- Preceded by: President's Rule
- Succeeded by: Gummanur Jayaram

Member of Legislative Assembly Andhra Pradesh
- Incumbent
- Assumed office 2024
- Preceded by: Perni Venkataramaiah
- Constituency: Machilipatnam
- In office 2014–2019
- Preceded by: Perni Venkataramaiah
- Succeeded by: Perni Venkataramaiah
- Constituency: Machilipatnam

Personal details
- Born: Machilipatnam, Krishna District, Andhra Pradesh, India
- Party: Telugu Desam Party
- Children: 2
- Education: B.A (Ambedkar open University), B.L.Hindu college (Nagarjuna University)
- Profession: Politician

Kollu Ravindra is an Indian politician from Andhra Pradesh currently serving as the Minister for Mines and Geology in the Government of Andhra Pradesh. He is a Member of the Legislative Assembly (MLA) representing Machilipatnam assembly constituency.

== Early life ==
Kollu Ravindra was born in Machilipatnam, Krishna District. He belongs to the Agnikula Kshatriya community. He entered into politics in 1998 and became Telugu Desam Party youth president of Machilipatnam.

== Political life ==
Kollu Ravindra entered politics in 1998 as Youth President of the Telugu Desam Party (TDP) in Machilipatnam, a position he held for ten years. He was then given the TDP ticket in Machilipatnam for the May 2009 Andhra Pradesh Assembly elections. He lost that election by 9,300 votes to the Congress candidate Perni Venkataramaiah. Five years later, in 2014, he defeated the same Perni Venkataramaiah by 15,800 votes. He then entered the Andhra Pradesh Cabinet with two portfolios: Handlooms & Excise and BC Welfare and Empowerment.

In March 2015, Kollu Ravindra started Sparsha, a charity dedicated to the education of poor people in Machilipatnam.

Following a cabinet reshuffle in April 2017, he was appointed Minister for Law & Justice, Skill Development, Youth, Sports, Unemployment Benefits, NRI Empowerment and Relations.

== Personal life ==
Kollu Ravindra is married to Neelima and the couple has two sons. His father-in-law is former Andhra Pradesh Cabinet Minister Nadakuditi Narasimha Rao.

== Notable acts as Minister ==
- In February 2017 Kollu Ravindra inaugurated National Handloom Exhibition in Guntur.
- In May 2018, Kollu Ravindra inaugurated naipunya at Mangalagiri.
- In June 2018, Kollu Ravindra inaugurated Cargo services at the Gannavaram international airport.
- In July 2018, Kollu Ravindra inaugurated the APNRT Migrant Resource building in the Guntur district.
- In February 2019, Kollu Ravindra launched the Youth for Andhra mobile app.

Political offices
Preceded by Office established	Cabinet Minister; 8 April 2014 – 29 May 2019	Succeeded by M. Srinivasarao
