= Bhogireddipalli =

Bhogireddipalli Bhogireddypalle
- Village
- Interactive map of Bhogireddipalli
- Location in Andhra Pradesh, India
- Coordinates: 16.114°N 81.021°E
- Country: India
- State: Andhra Pradesh
- Districts: Krishna

Area
  - Total: 9.21 km^{2} (3.56 sq mi)

Population (2011)
  - Total: 2,350
  - Density: 255/km^{2} (661/sq mi)

Languages
  - Official: Telugu
- Time zone: UTC+5:30 (IST)
- PIN: 521131

Bhogireddipalli (also spelled as Bhogireddypalle) is a village in Krishna district of India in the state of Andhra Pradesh. It is located in Machilipatnam mandal of Machilipatnam revenue division.
