= Kona, Monarch of Monster Isle =

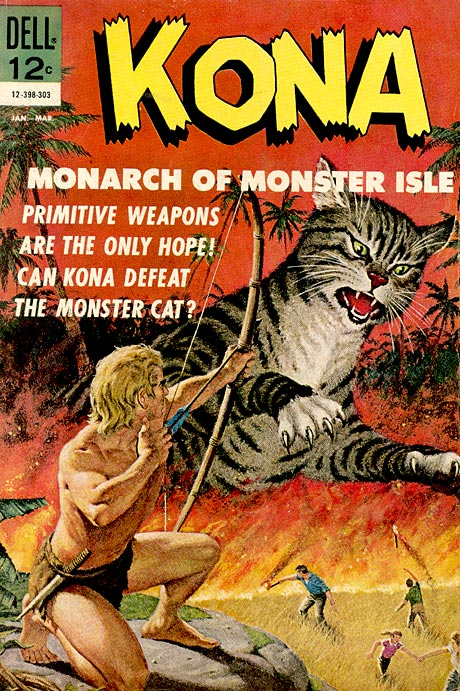
Cover to Kona, Monarch of Monster Isle #5, art by unknown.

Kona, Monarch of Monster Isle is a fictional American comic book character who was featured in his own self-titled series, published by Dell Comics in the 1960s.

== Publication history ==
Kona debuted in Four Color Comics #1256 (dated February 1962) before his own self-titled series started a few months later with issue #2 (dated June 1962). Kona, Monarch of Monster Isle would run to issue #21 (dated June 1964). The series was plotted by Don Segall, scripted and drawn by Sam Glanzman. Later stories were scripted by Paul S. Newman.

== Fictional character biography ==
Kona saves the lives of Dr. Henry Dodd, his daughter Mary and his grandchildren Mason and Lily after this group crashes their army surplus blimp on the prehistoric Pacific island that Kona calls home. Befriending them, Kona becomes their protector and saves them from many huge animals and monsters.

Dr. Dodd and his family eventually escape from the island, but later return to get Kona. After this Kona travels the world with them as their protector from the many huge monsters they encounter.

== Reception ==
Comparing "Monster Isle" to another, more famous fictional land of monsters, Robert Michael Carter writes in The Great Monster Magazines that "Kona, Monarch of Monster Isle ripped off Burroughs and Pellucidar for 21 issues".
