= Machilipatnam Assembly constituency =

Constituency of the Andhra Pradesh Legislative Assembly, India

Coordinates: 16.18°N 81.13°E

Machilipatnam
- Constituency No. 75 for the Andhra Pradesh Legislative Assembly
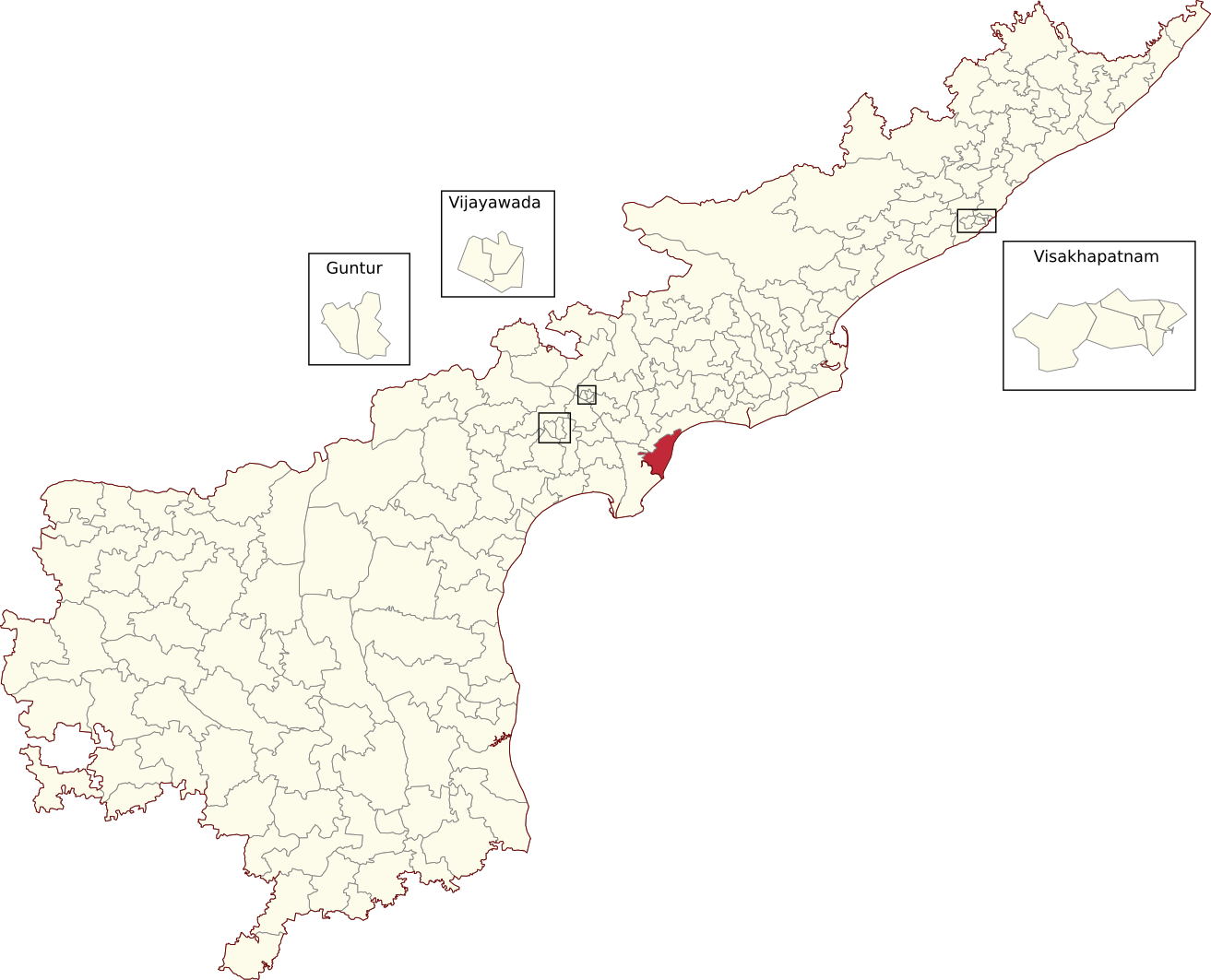
- Location of Machilipatnam Assembly constituency within Andhra Pradesh

Constituency details
- Country: India
- Region: South India
- State: Andhra Pradesh
- District: Krishna
- Lok Sabha constituency: Machilipatnam
- Established: 2008
- Total electors: 184,506
- Reservation: None

Member of Legislative Assembly
- 16th Andhra Pradesh Legislative Assembly
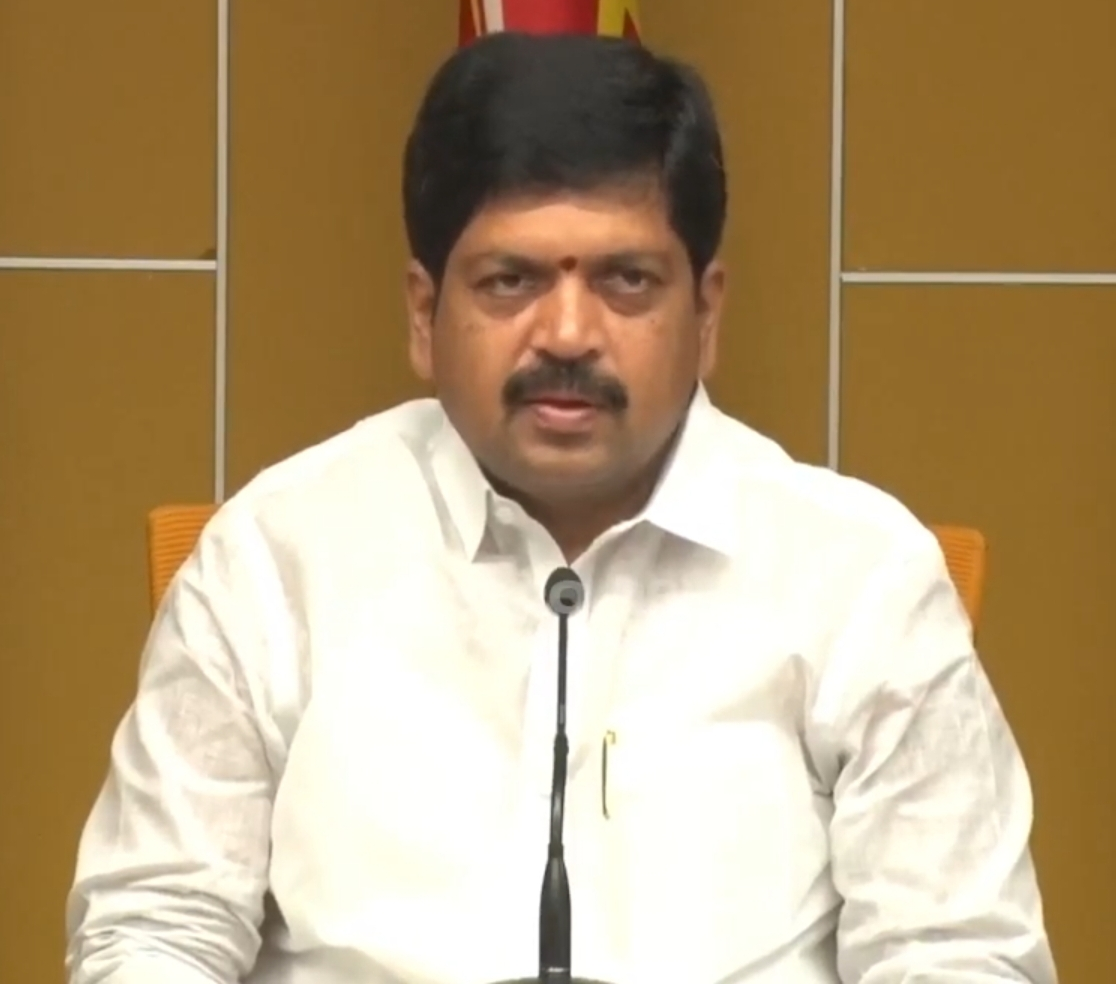
- Incumbent Kollu Ravindra
- Party: TDP
- Alliance: NDA
- Elected year: 2024

Machilipatnam Assembly constituency is a constituency in Krishna district of Andhra Pradesh that elects representatives to the Andhra Pradesh Legislative Assembly in India. It is one of the seven assembly segments of Machilipatnam Lok Sabha constituency.

Kollu Ravindra is the current MLA of the constituency, having won the 2024 Andhra Pradesh Legislative Assembly election from Telugu Desam Party. As of 2019, there are a total of 184,506 electors in the constituency. The constituency was established in 2008, as per the Delimitation Orders (2008).

== Mandals ==
Machilipatnam Assembly Constituency

Machilipatnam mandal is the only mandal that forms the assembly constituency.

== Members of the Legislative Assembly ==
Year	Member	Political party
2009	Perni Venkataramaiah (Nani)	Indian National Congress
2014	Kollu Ravindra	Telugu Desam Party
2019	Perni Venkataramaiah (Nani)	YSR Congress Party
2024	Kollu Ravindra	Telugu Desam Party

== Election results ==
=== 2024 ===
2024 Andhra Pradesh Legislative Assembly election: Machilipatnam
Party	Candidate	Votes	%	±%
TDP	Kollu Ravindra	105,044	63.73	
YSRCP	Perni Vaka Sai Krishna Murthy (Kittu)	54,802	33.25	
INC	Abdul Mateen	1443	0.88	
NOTA	None Of The Above	1027	0.62	
Majority		50,242	30.47	
Turnout		1,64,839		
TDP hold		Swing		

=== 2019 ===
2019 Andhra Pradesh Legislative Assembly election: Machilipatnam
Party	Candidate	Votes	%	±%
YSRCP	Perni Venkataramaiah	66,141	44.36	
TDP	Kollu Ravindra	60,290	40.44	
JSP	Bandi Rama Krishna	18,807	12.61	
Majority		5,851	3.92	
Turnout		147,180	79.77	
YSRCP gain from TDP		Swing		

=== 2014 ===
2014 Andhra Pradesh Legislative Assembly election: Machilipatnam
Party	Candidate	Votes	%	±%
TDP	Kollu Ravindra	75,209	53.43	
YSRCP	Perni Venkataramaiah	59,403	42.2	
Majority		15,806	11.2	
Turnout				
TDP gain from INC		Swing		

=== 2009 ===
2009 Andhra Pradesh Legislative Assembly election: Machilipatnam
Party	Candidate	Votes	%	±%
INC	Perni Venkataramaiah	48,580	37.87	
TDP	Kollu Ravindra	37,181	28.98	
PRP	Vedavyas Buragadda	34,124	27.38	
Majority		11,499	8.09	
Turnout				
INC win (new seat)				

== See also ==
- List of constituencies of the Andhra Pradesh Legislative Assembly
