= Machilipatnam mandal =

- Former mandal of Andhra Pradesh
- 2023
- Capital: Machilipatnam
- Population
  - 2011 Census: 238,962
Succeeded by
Machilipatnam North mandal; Machilipatnam South mandal

Machilipatnam mandal was one of the 25 mandals in Krishna district of the Indian state of Andhra Pradesh. It is under the administration of Machilipatnam revenue division, and the headquarters are located in Machilipatnam town. The mandal is bounded by Bantumilli, Pedana, Gudur, Ghantasala, Challapalli, and Koduru mandals.

It was divided into Machilipatnam North mandal and Machilipatnam South mandal on 8 May 2023 .

== Demographics ==
As of 2011 census, the mandal had a population of 238,962. The total population constitute, 118,820 males and 120,142 females —a sex ratio of 1011 females per 1000 males. 21,272 children are in the age group of 0–6 years, of which 11,037 are boys and 10,235 are girls. The average literacy rate stands at 78.62% with 171,144 literates.

== Towns and villages ==
As of 2011 census, the mandal has 29 settlements. It includes 1 town and 28 villages in the mandal. Chinnapuram is the most populated village and Potlapalem is the least populated village in the mandal.

The settlements in the mandal are listed below:

1. Arisepalli [N]
2. Bandar [S]
3. Bhogireddipalle [S]
4. Borrapothupalem [N]
5. Buddalapalem [N]
6. Chilakalapudi (rural) [N]
7. Chinnapuram [S]
8. Gokavaram [N]
9. Gopuvanipalem [N]
10. Gundupalem [S]
11. Hussainpalem [N]
12. Kanuru [N]
13. Karagraharam [N]
14. Kona [S]
15. Kottapudi [N]
16. Machavaram (rural) [N]
17. Machilipatnam (M - Ward 1 to 19, 40 to 50) [N]
18. Machilipatnam (M - Ward 20 to 39) [S]
19. Manginapudi [N]
20. Nelakuru [S]
21. Palletummalapalem [S]
22. Pedapatnam [N]
23. Pedayadara [S]
24. Polatitippa [S]
25. Pothepalli [N]
26. Potlapalem [N]
27. Rudravaram [S]
28. Sultannagaram Gollapalem [S]
29. Tallapalem [N]
30. Tavisipudi [N]

Note: M-Municipality

== Government and politics ==
Machilipatnam mandal is under Machilipatnam (Assembly constituency), which in turn represents Machilipatnam (Lok Sabha constituency) of Andhra Pradesh. The present MLA representing Machilipatnam (Assembly constituency) is Kollu Ravindra of Telugu Desam Party.

== See also ==
- List of villages in Krishna district
