= Machilipatnam Municipal Corporation =

Local civic body in Machilipatnam, Andhra Pradesh, India

Machilipatnam Municipal Corporation Macilīpaṭnaṁ nagara pālaka Sanstha
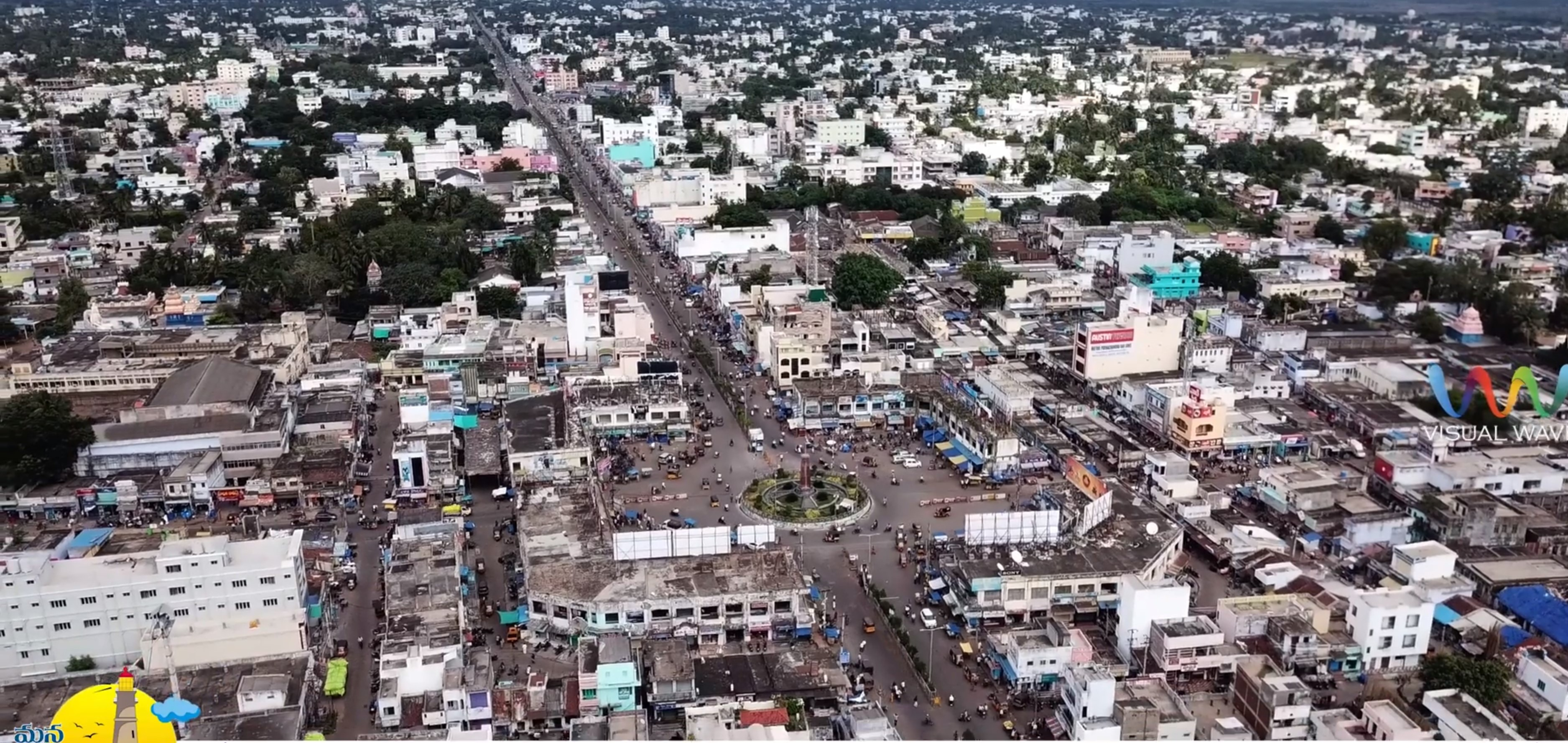

Type
- Type: Municipal corporation of the Machilipatnam

History
- Founded: 2015

Leadership
- Mayor: Shaik Abdul Abida, TDP
- Deputy Mayor: Vacant
- Municipal Commissioner: Ch.V.V.S.Bapi Raju

Structure
- Political groups: Government (48) Kutami (48): TDP (34); JSP (13); BJP (1); Opposition (12): YSRCP (09); IND (3)

Elections
- Last election: 01 November 2026
- Next election: 2031

Website
- Machilipatnam Municipal Corporation

Machilipatnam Municipal Corporation is the civic body that governs the city of Machilipatnam in the Indian state of Andhra Pradesh. Machilipatnam was upgraded to corporation, but it continues to be a municipality till the expiry of its present elected council. Municipal Corporation mechanism in India was introduced during British Rule with formation of municipal corporation in Madras (Chennai) in 1688, later followed by municipal corporations in Bombay (Mumbai) and Calcutta (Kolkata) by 1762. Machilipatnam Municipal Corporation is headed by Mayor of city and governed by Commissioner.

== Jurisdiction ==
The corporation is spread over an area of 26.67 km^{2} (10.30 sq mi). It was constituted as a municipality in the year 1866 and was upgraded to corporation from special grade municipality on 9 December 2015.

== List of Mayors ==
Machilipatnam Municipal Corporation (MMC)
Sno.	Mayor	DY Mayor	Term start	Term end	Party	Notes
1.	M.Venkateswaramma	T.Kavitha; L.Suribabu	2021	2023	YSR Congress Party	First Mayor of MMC
2.	C.Venkateswaramma	T.Kavitha; L.Suribabu	2023	2026	YSR Congress Party	

Party name	Symbol	Won	Change
YSR Congress Party		44	Steady
Telugu Desam Party		5	Steady
Jana Sena Party		1	Steady

== Administration ==
The corporation is administered by an elected body, headed by the Mayor. The corporation population as per the 2011 Census of India was 169,892. The present commissioner of the corporation is Chandraiah and the municipal chair person is Moka venkateswaramma.

== Functions ==
Machilipatnam Municipal Corporation is created for the following functions:

- Planning for the town including its surroundings which are covered under its Department's Urban Planning Authority .
- Approving construction of new buildings and authorising use of land for various purposes.
- Improvement of the town's economic and Social status.
- Arrangements of water supply towards commercial, residential and industrial purposes.
- Planning for fire contingencies through Fire Service Departments.
- Creation of solid waste management, public health system and sanitary services.
- Working for the development of ecological aspect like development of Urban Forestry and making guidelines for environmental protection.
- Working for the development of weaker sections of the society like mentally and physically handicapped, old age and gender biased people.
- Making efforts for improvement of slums and poverty removal in the town.

== Revenue sources ==
The following are the Income sources for the corporation from the Central and State Government.

=== Revenue from taxes ===
Following is the Tax related revenue for the corporation.

- Property tax.
- Profession tax.
- Entertainment tax.
- Grants from Central and State Government like Goods and Services Tax.
- Advertisement tax.

=== Revenue from non-tax sources ===
Following is the Non Tax related revenue for the corporation.

- Water usage charges.
- Fees from Documentation services.
- Rent received from municipal property.
- Funds from municipal bonds.

=== Revenue from taxes ===
Following is the Tax related revenue for the corporation.

- Property tax.
- Profession tax.
- Entertainment tax.
- Grants from Central and State Government like Goods and Services Tax.
- Advertisement tax.

=== Revenue from non-tax sources ===
Following is the Non Tax related revenue for the corporation.

- Water usage charges.
- Fees from Documentation services.
- Rent received from municipal property.
- Funds from municipal bonds.

== Awards and achievements ==
In 2015, as per the Swachh Bharat Abhiyan of the Ministry of Urban Development, Machilipatnam Municipal Corporation was ranked 301st in the country.
