= Machilipatnam =

Machilipatnam Masulipatnam Masulipatam Bandar
- City
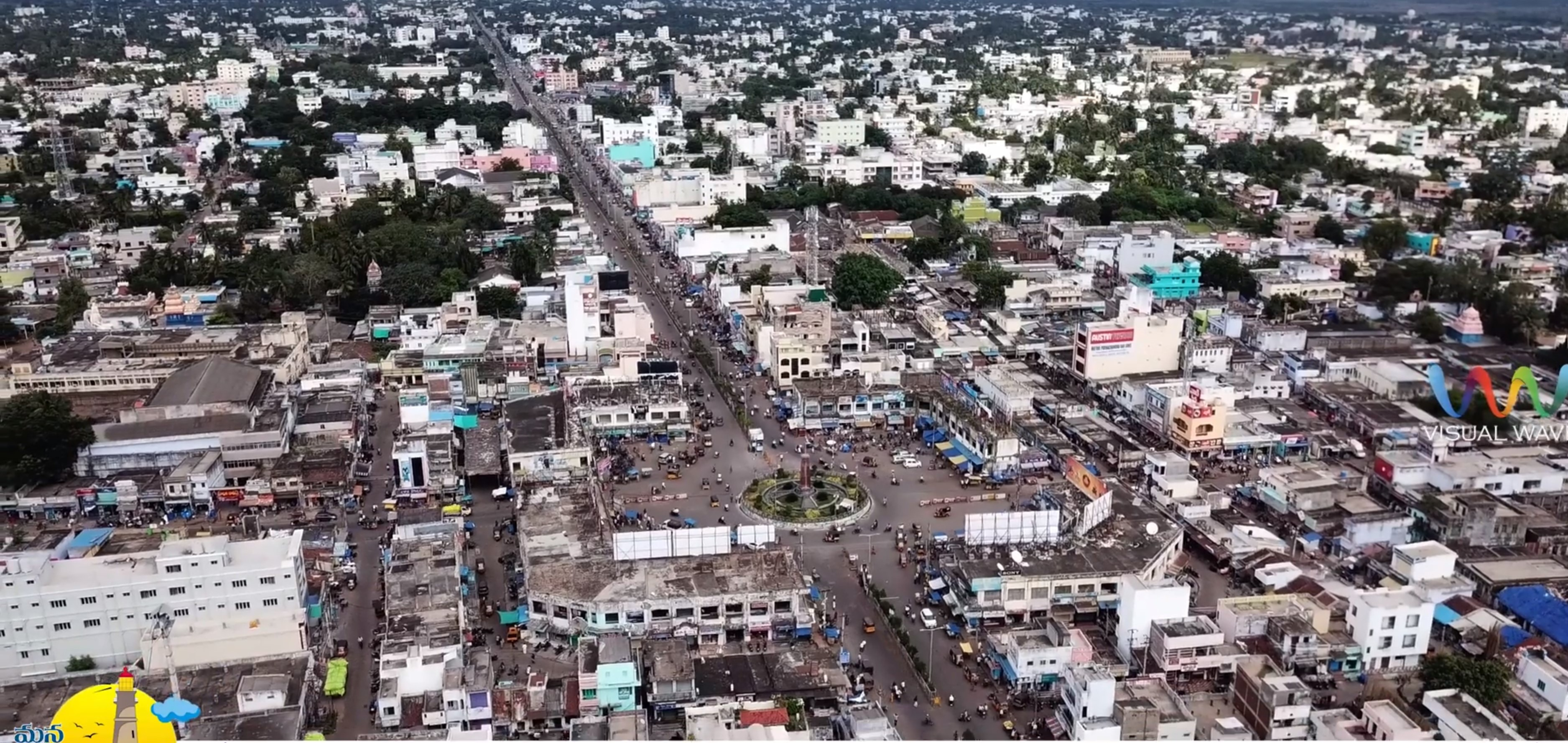
- Koneru Centre

- Location in Andhra Pradesh, India Machilipatnam (India)
- Coordinates: 16.17°N 81.13°E
- Country: India
- State: Andhra Pradesh
- District: Krishna district
- Founded: 14th century

Government
  - Type: Municipal Corporation
  - Body: Machilipatnam Municipal Corporation, MUDA
  - MLA: Kollu Ravindra (Telugu Desam Party)
  - Municipal commissioner: Chandraiah

Area
  - City: 126.67 km^{2} (48.91 sq mi)
- Elevation: 14 m (46 ft)

Population (2011)
  - Density: 6,875/km^{2} (17,810/sq mi)
  - Urban: 232,000

Languages
  - Official: Telugu
- Time zone: UTC+5:30 (IST)
- PIN: 521001,002,003,004
- Telephone code: 91-08672
- Vehicle registration: AP-39, AP-40
- Website: machilipatnam.cdma.ap.gov.in

Machilipatnam (Telugu: [mɐt͡ʃiliːpɐʈnɐm]), also known as Masulipatnam, Masulipatam, or Bandar (Telugu: [bɐn̪d̪ɐɾu]), is a city in Krishna district of the Indian state of Andhra Pradesh, located 60 kilometres (37 mi) from Vijayawada. It is a municipal corporation and the administrative headquarters of Krishna district. It is also the mandal headquarters of Machilipatnam mandal in Machilipatnam revenue division of the district. The ancient port town served as the settlement of European traders from the 16th century, and it was a major trading port for the Portuguese, British, Dutch and French in the 17th century.

== Etymology ==
During the 17th century, it was known by the names Masulipatnam, Masulipatam, Masula, and Bandar (bandar translates to 'port' in Persian). The port town in the ancient times was also referred with the name Maesolia.

== History ==
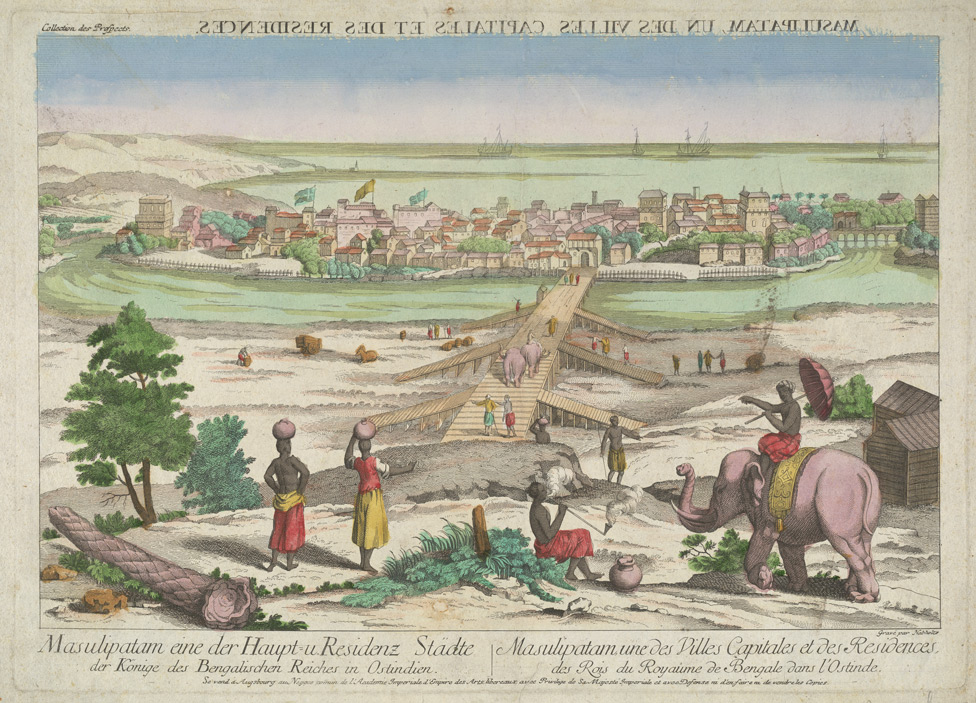
View of Masulipatam in 1676

The town has existed since at least the 3rd century BCE (Satavahana period) when, according to Ptolemy, it was known as Maisolos. The Periplus of the Erythraean Sea calls it Masalia in the 1st-century BCE. The port is on the southeastern, or Coromandel Coast, of India. At the mouth of the River Krishna on the Bay of Bengal, the Masula port saw flourishing sea trade.

The word muslin derived from the name Maisolos. Muslin was a significant source of income for the town, being a favourite of Roman traders for domestic consumption. Several Roman coins were found during excavations of Buddhist towns near Machilipatnam.

The town served as the primary sea port for the Kingdom of Golkonda. It was an outlet for textiles produced in the Godavari Delta. It was a major source of income for the kingdom, and contributed to its immense prosperity in the 1620s and 1630s.

By the end of the 17th century, the port city had fallen into decline. This coincided with the Mughal conquest of Golkonda. However, mismanagement prior to the conquest may have also been a factor in the city's decline.

Salabat Jung, the son of Nizam-ul-Mulk Asaf Jah I, who was indebted for his elevation to the throne to the French East India Company, granted them in return for their services the district of Kondavid or Guntur, and soon afterwards the remainder of the Circars. The Circars were captured by the British from the French in 1759 and were returned to the Nizam. However Masulipatnam captured by the British during the Siege of Masulipatam was retained by the East India Company.

The town was the district headquarters of the then, Masulipatnam district and now to the Krishna district, which was formed in 1859 in the composite Madras state.

== Geographical area ==
Machilipatnam city is at 16.17°N 81.13°E on the southeast coast of India and in the east coast of Andhra Pradesh. The city has an average elevation of 14 metres (46 ft).

=== Climate ===
Machilipatnam (city) gets most of its annual rainfall due to the southwest monsoon. It has a tropical savanna climate (Köppen climate classification Aw) with hot summers and moderate winters. The hottest months are between April and June. The average normal rainfall in the district is 959 millimetres (37.8 in) and Machilipatnam is vulnerable to high surges of the sea due to cyclones. The 1864 Machilipatnam Cyclone claimed to have killed at least 30,000 people. The 1977 Andhra Pradesh cyclone crossed the coast near Nizampatnam and took approximately 10,000 lives. As the storm approached the coast, gale winds reaching 200 km/h (120 mph) lashed Prakasam, Guntur, Krishna, East Godavari and West Godavari districts. A 5-metre-high (16 ft) storm surge inundated the Krishna estuary and the coast south of the city (Bandar).

On 8 December 2004, a high capacity S-Band Doppler cyclone warning radar was installed, commissioned and made operational at the city by the German manufacturer Gematronik. With the installation of the radar, it is hoped the state will be better equipped to track cyclones. The facility will monitor the 960 km (600 mi) long coastline of the state.

Climate data for Machilipatnam (1991–2020, extremes 1901–2020)
Month	Jan	Feb	Mar	Apr	May	Jun	Jul	Aug	Sep	Oct	Nov	Dec	Year
Record high °C (°F)	34.5 (94.1)	37.4 (99.3)	42.2 (108.0)	44.4 (111.9)	47.8 (118.0)	47.0 (116.6)	42.8 (109.0)	39.8 (103.6)	38.2 (100.8)	37.8 (100.0)	35.4 (95.7)	34.6 (94.3)	47.8 (118.0)
Mean daily maximum °C (°F)	29.5 (85.1)	31.3 (88.3)	33.5 (92.3)	35.4 (95.7)	37.8 (100.0)	36.8 (98.2)	34.2 (93.6)	33.3 (91.9)	33.3 (91.9)	32.2 (90.0)	30.8 (87.4)	29.6 (85.3)	33.1 (91.6)
Daily mean °C (°F)	24.9 (76.8)	26.3 (79.3)	28.5 (83.3)	30.8 (87.4)	32.9 (91.2)	32.1 (89.8)	30.3 (86.5)	29.8 (85.6)	29.7 (85.5)	28.5 (83.3)	26.8 (80.2)	25.0 (77.0)	28.8 (83.8)
Mean daily minimum °C (°F)	20.2 (68.4)	21.4 (70.5)	23.6 (74.5)	26.2 (79.2)	28.2 (82.8)	27.7 (81.9)	26.4 (79.5)	26.1 (79.0)	26.1 (79.0)	25.0 (77.0)	22.8 (73.0)	20.5 (68.9)	24.5 (76.1)
Record low °C (°F)	13.4 (56.1)	14.4 (57.9)	16.1 (61.0)	18.0 (64.4)	17.8 (64.0)	20.0 (68.0)	19.0 (66.2)	19.0 (66.2)	18.3 (64.9)	18.0 (64.4)	13.9 (57.0)	13.2 (55.8)	13.2 (55.8)
Average rainfall mm (inches)	6.9 (0.27)	12.4 (0.49)	0.9 (0.04)	9.3 (0.37)	43.3 (1.70)	124.4 (4.90)	182.9 (7.20)	173.4 (6.83)	183.7 (7.23)	208.1 (8.19)	114.4 (4.50)	15.3 (0.60)	1,074.9 (42.32)
Average rainy days	0.6	0.6	0.2	0.6	1.9	6.5	10.5	10.4	8.7	8.6	3.7	0.9	53.1
Average relative humidity (%) (at 17:30 IST)	68	66	67	68	64	61	67	70	73	76	74	70	69
Source 1: India Meteorological Department
Source 2: Tokyo Climate Center (mean temperatures 1991–2020)

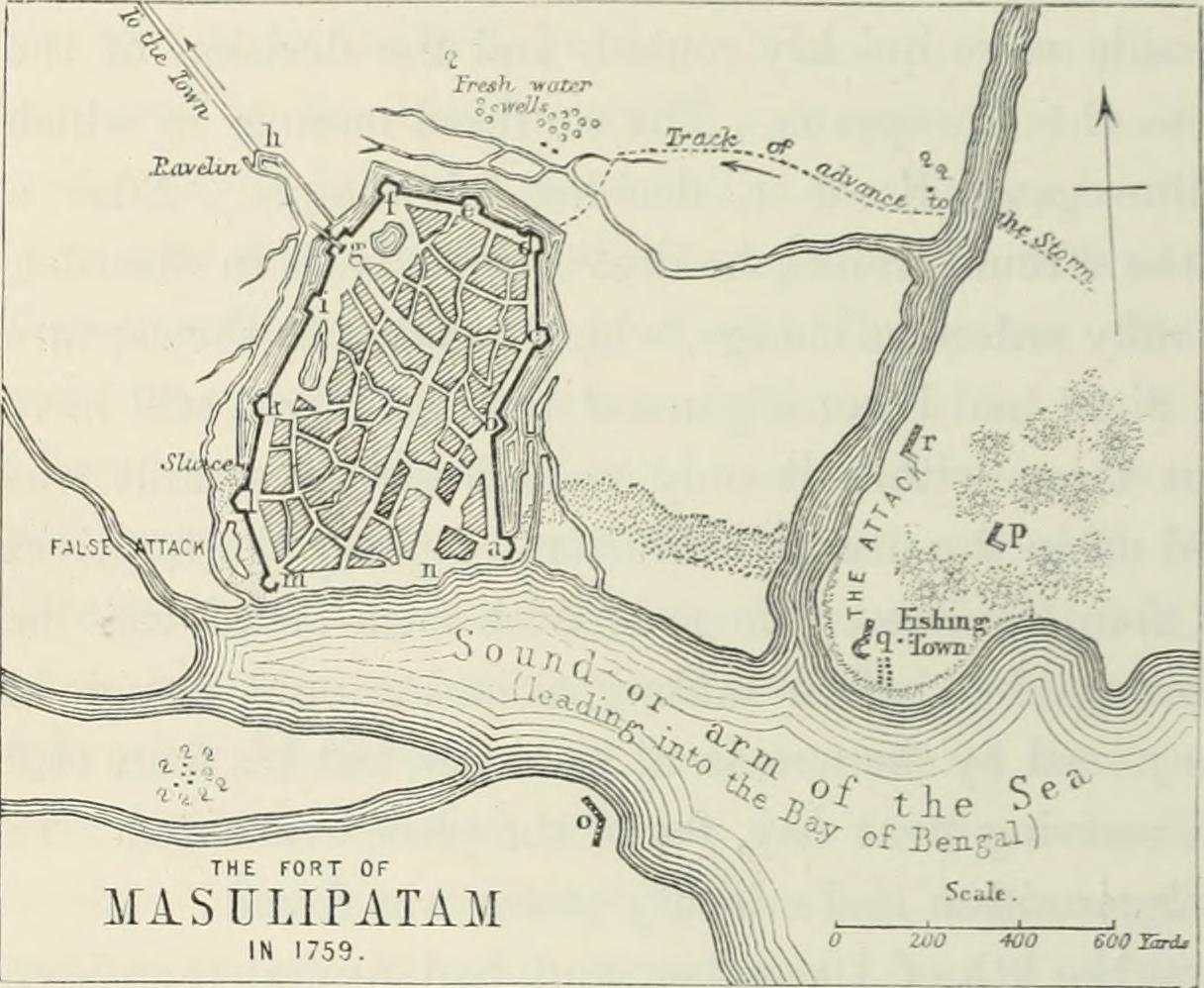
Masulipatam port in 1759

Historical population
Year	Pop.	±%
1871	36,188	—
1881	35,056	−3.1%
1891	38,809	+10.7%
1901	39,507	+1.8%
1911	42,123	+6.6%
1921	43,940	+4.3%
1931	56,928	+29.6%
1941	59,146	+3.9%
1951	77,953	+31.8%
1961	101,417	+30.1%
1971	112,612	+11.0%
1981	138,525	+23.0%
1991	159,110	+14.9%
2001	179,353	+12.7%
2011	169,892	−5.3%

== Demographics ==
As of 2011 census, Machilipatnam had a population of 232,000. The total population constitutes 113,286 males and 118,714 females — a sex ratio of 1047 females per 1000 males. 13,778 children are in the age group of 0–6 years, of which 7,076 are boys and 6,702 are girls. The average literacy rate stands at 83.32% with 130,173 literates, significantly higher than the state average of 67.41%.

== Governance ==
=== Civic administration ===
Machilipatnam Municipal Corporation is the civic body of the city. It was constituted as a municipality in 1866 and was upgraded to corporation from special grade municipality on 9 December 2015. It covers an area of 26.67 km^{2} (10.30 sq mi) under its jurisdiction. The present commissioner of the corporation is Sampath and the municipal chairperson is Motamarri Venkata Baba Prasad.

Machilipatnam Urban Development Authority is the urban planning authority, headquartered at Machilipatnam.

=== Politics ===
Machilipatnam is a part of Machilipatnam assembly constituency for Andhra Pradesh Legislative Assembly. Kollu Ravindra is the present MLA of the constituency from the Telugu Desam Party. The assembly segment is also a part of Machilipatnam (Lok Sabha constituency), which was won by Balashowry Vallabhaneni of Janasena Party.

== Economy ==
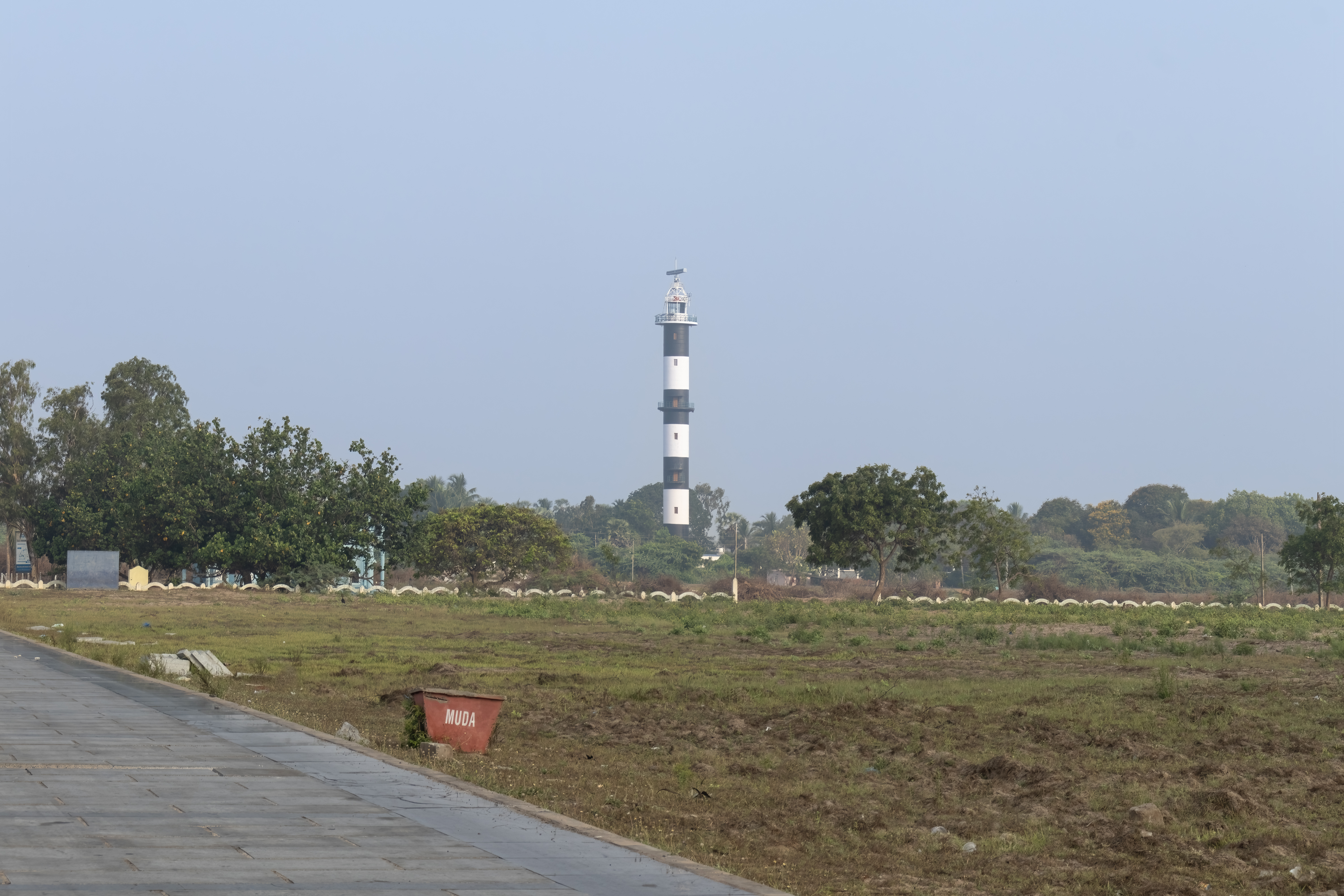
Lighthouse near Manginapudi Beach

Machilipatnam is known for its handloom industry, which produces Kalamkari textiles exported to the United States as well as to Asian countries.

Other notable local industries are boat building and fishing. Machilipatnam was a trading base for the Europeans in the 17th century and known for minting copper coins, exporting diamonds, textiles etc., through the port.

The Andhra Pradesh state government is taking measures to bring back the glory of the former port city. On 7 February 2019, it started construction of a deep seaport and associated industrial corridor under the Machilipatnam Area Development Authority.

== Culture ==
=== Art and handicrafts ===
Machilipatnam Kalamkari is a handcrafted dyed block-painting of a fabric. It is performed at the nearby town of Pedana and was registered with geographical indication from Andhra Pradesh. Machilipatnam and Srikalahasti styles are the only existing Kalamkari style works present in India.

=== Dance ===
Kuchipudi, a popular Indian Classical Dance form, originated at Kuchipudi, 25 kilometres (16 mi) from Machilipatnam.

=== Cuisine ===
The city is well known for a sweet known as Bandar Laddu and Bandar Halwa. Almond Milkshake is also largely famous in Machilipatanam which are Mostly centred in Koneru Centre. Bandar Biryani is delicious, which is made by Shia Muslims in Moharram rituals .

=== Religious worship ===
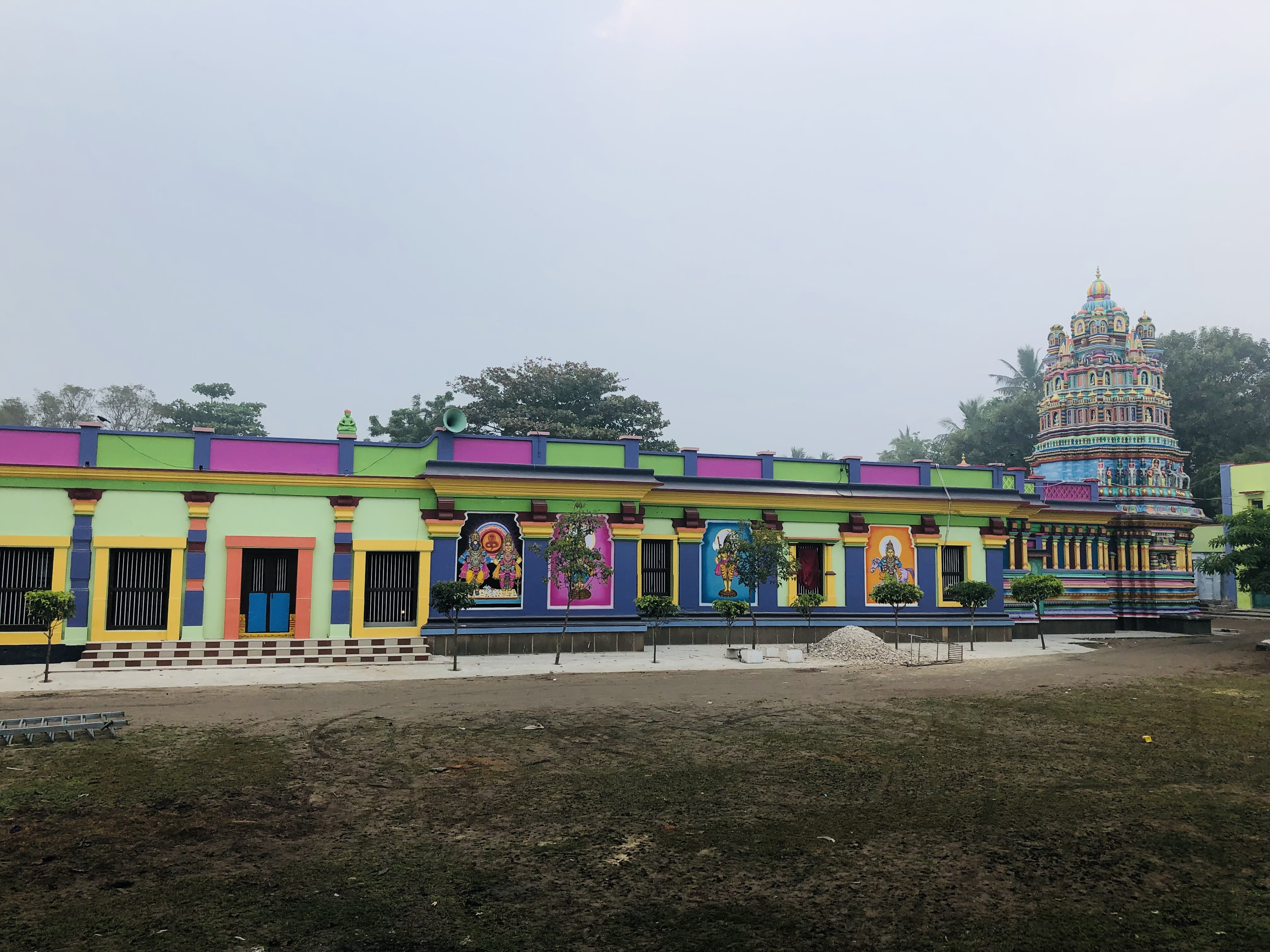
Panduranga Swami Temple, located in Chilakalapudi, Machilipatnam

There are many religions with worship centers in and around the city, such as Panduranga Temple at Chilakalapudi, Agastheeswara Temple etc. Dattashram is a pilgrimage site on the coast and home to ancient Shiva and Datta temples. Manginapudi is popularly known as "Datta Rameswaram" due to the consecration of 12 wells for bathing (recalling those at Rameswaram).

=== Shia Muslims ===
Machilipatnam is home to the largest Shia Muslim population in the entire state of Andhra Pradesh. The city hosts more than a hundred Astanas/Imambargahs (which are places for Moharram rituals). The famous chest beating ceremonies happen on Ashura in the Koneru Centre circle, attracting thousands of mourners and visitors from other religions. There are Imambargahs that are more than 600 years old, such as the Zari Astana, Baraimam Astana, Naqla Astana, and others. The Baraimam Alam is taken out for procession through the streets of Machilipatnam, a night before Ashura. and the Krishna district police offers a dhati (cloth) to the Alam. Hundreds of Shia Muslims from Hyderabad, Chennai, Bangalore, and Visakhapatnam visit the Chehlum Astana for the 17th Safar of the Islamic calendar, where Hazrat Abbas's Arabaeen attracts thousands of mourners from across South Asia.

== Tourism ==
Manginapudi Beach is on the coast of the city. Machilipatnam also has the ruined buildings built by the Europeans who settled here.

== Transport ==
The city has a total road length of 359.09 km (223.13 mi). The National Highway 65 connects Machilipatnam to Pune via Hyderabad, Suryapet and Vijayawada. NH 216 from Kattipudi to Ongole, passes through the city.

The city's bus station is owned and operated by Andhra Pradesh State Road Transport Corporation. The station is equipped with a bus depot for storage and maintenance of buses.

Machilipatnam railway station is a 'B–Category' and 'Adarsh station' under the jurisdiction of Vijayawada railway division. It is the terminal station of Vijayawada-Machilipatnam branch line that connects Howrah-Chennai main line at Vijayawada.

Machilipatnam port was damaged by a giant ocean wave on 1 November 1864. Since then, there were many efforts to build a new port. Navayuga Engineering Company Limited is in the process of building a deep water port at Gilakaladinne of the city.

The nearest international airport is Vijayawada Airport, which is 63 km (39 mi) away.

== Education ==
The primary and secondary school education is imparted by government, aided, and private schools of the School Education Department of the state. Krishna University is located in Machilipatnam.

== Notable natives ==
- Muhammad Taqi Khan, Nawab of Machilipatnam
- N. Madhava Rao 23rd Dewan of Mysore
- Divi Gopalacharlu - Ayurvedic scholar
- Timmarusu - Prime Minister of Raja Krishnadevaraya, the emperor of Vijayanagara Empire
- Pingali Venkayya - Independence activist; designer of the national flag
- Chitrapu Narayana Murthy - Indian director known for films like AVM's Bhaktha Prahlada (1967)
- Mutnuri Krishna Rao - Independence activist and journalist
- U. G. Krishnamurthy - Philosopher
- Bhogaraju Pattabhisitaramayya - Indian independence activist and political leader
- Raghupathi Venkaiah Naidu - father of Telugu cinema, Indian artiste and film maker
- C. K. Nayudu - Indian cricketer
- Poornima - Indian actress who starred in many Telugu, Tamil, Kannada and Malayalam films.
- Jagapathi Babu - Telugu actor.
- B. Vasantha - South Indian playback singer.
- Master Venu - Music composer of the Telugu and Tamil cinemas.
- C. S. R. Anjaneyulu - C. S. R., was an Indian film method actor, and thespian best known for his works in Telugu cinema and Telugu theater.
- Nirmalamma - Telugu actress known for her grandmother roles in old films.
- Maruthi - Indian director, screenwriter, producer who works primarily in Telugu cinema.
- Mani Sharma - Indian composer, singer, arranger, multi-instrumentalist and music producer known for his works primarily in the Telugu and Tamil cinema along with Hindi and Kannada films.
- Achyuth - Indian actor
- Srikanth Bolla - First Indian blind boy to study at Massachusetts Institute of Technology and an entrepreneur and founder of Bollant Industries.
- Turaga Desiraju - neurophysiologist and a professor at National Institute of Mental Health and Neurosciences

== See also ==
- List of cities in Andhra Pradesh
- List of municipal corporations in Andhra Pradesh
- Largest Indian cities by GDP
