= Dell Comics =

American comic book publisher

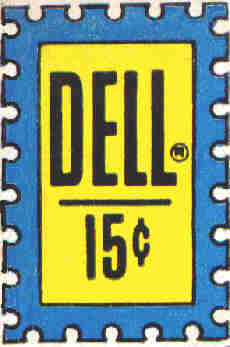
- Parent company: Dell Publishing
- Founded: 1929; 97 years ago
- Founder: George T. Delacorte, Jr.
- Defunct: 1973; 53 years ago
- Country of origin: United States
- Headquarters location: New York City
- Key people: Helen Meyer
- Publication types: Comic books
- Fiction genres: Licensed material

Dell Comics was the comic book publishing arm of Dell Publishing, which got its start in pulp magazines. It published comics from 1929 to 1973. At its peak, it was the most prominent and successful American company in the medium. In 1953, Dell claimed to be the world's largest comics publisher, selling 26 million copies each month.

== History ==
=== Origins ===
Its first title was The Funnies (1929), described by the Library of Congress as "a short-lived newspaper tabloid insert" rather than a comic book. Comics historian Ron Goulart describes the 16-page, four-color, newsprint periodical as "more a Sunday comic section without the rest of the newspaper than a true comic book. But it did offer all original material and was sold on newsstands". It ran 36 weekly issues, published Saturdays from January 16, 1929, to October 16, 1930. The cover price rose from 10¢ to 30¢ with issue #3. This was reduced to a nickel from issue #22 to the end.

In 1933, Dell collaborated with Eastern Color Printing to publish the 36-page Famous Funnies: A Carnival of Comics, considered by historians the first true American comic book; Goulart, for example, calls it "the cornerstone for one of the most lucrative branches of magazine publishing". It was distributed through the Woolworth's department store chain, though it is unclear whether it was sold or given away; the cover displays no price, but Goulart refers, either metaphorically or literally, to the publisher "sticking a ten-cent pricetag [sic] on the comic books".

In early 1934, Dell published the single-issue Famous Funnies: Series 1, also printed by Eastern Color. Unlike its predecessor, it was intended from the start to be sold rather than given away.

In 1936, the company partnered with McClure Syndicate in which Dell would finance and distribute publications that McClure would produce and edit on behalf of then-company executive Max Gaines and editor Sheldon Mayer. Among the titles Gaines oversaw were The Comics, Popular Comics and The Funnies. Gaines would leave McClure, and by extension, Dell in 1939, in order to set up All-American Publications with a distribution/partnership agreement at DC.

=== Western Publishing ===
The company formed a partnership in 1938 with Western Publishing, in which Dell would finance and distribute publications that Western would produce. While this diverged from the regular practice in the medium of one company handling finance and production and outsourcing distribution, it was a highly successful enterprise with titles selling in the millions. Most of the Dell-produced comics done for Western Publishing during this period were under the Whitman Comics banner (later also used by Gold Key Comics); notable titles included Crackajack Funnies (1938–1942) and Super Comics (1938–1949).

Comic book historian Mark Carlson has stated that at its peak in the mid-1950s, "while Dell's total number of comic book titles [was] only 15% of those published, it control[ed] nearly a third of the total market. Dell [had] more million-plus sellers than any other company before or since".

In 1957, Dell ended its distribution deal with American News Company, which went out of business that year.

=== Western partnership ends, Dell declines ===
In 1961, Dell became the first comic book company to increase its cover prices, raising the prices to fifteen cents; this was soon lowered to twelve cents. In 1962 the partnership with Western ended, with Western taking most of its licensed properties and its original material and creating its own imprint, Gold Key Comics.

While most of the talent who had worked on the Dell line continued at Gold Key, a few creators like John Stanley stuck with Dell and its new line. Dell also drew new talent to its fold, such as Frank Springer, Don Arneson, and Lionel Ziprin.

Dell Comics continued for another 11 years with licensed television and motion picture adaptations (including Mission: Impossible, Ben Casey, Burke's Law, Dr. Kildare, Beach Blanket Bingo) and a few generally poorly received original titles. Among the few long lasting series from this time include the teen-comic Thirteen Going on Eighteen (29 issues, written by John Stanley), Ghost Stories (37 issues, #1 only written by John Stanley), Combat (40 issues), Ponytail (20 issues), Kona Monarch of Monster Isle (20 issues), Toka the Jungle King (10 issues), and Naza Stone Age Warrior (9 issues). Dell additionally attempted to do superhero titles, including Nukla, Superheroes (starring the Fab 4, as the group's name was spelled on covers), Brain Boy, and a critically ridiculed trio of titles based on the Universal Pictures monsters Frankenstein, Dracula and Werewolf that recast the characters as superheroes.

Dell Comics ceased publication in 1973, with a few of its former titles moving to Gold Key Comics.

== Materials ==
=== Licensed material ===
Dell Comics acquired the rights to make comics based on the characters of Walt Disney Productions in 1940. It later gained the rights to Warner Bros., Metro-Goldwyn-Mayer, and Walter Lantz Studio, along with many movie and television properties such as the Lone Ranger, Tarzan, Felix the Cat, Howdy Doody, Yogi Bear and other Hanna-Barbera characters.

The comics industry financially declined in the 1950s, but Dell benefited from its licensed comics. One-third of all comic sales in 1957 were from Dell.

=== Four Color ===
From 1938 to 1962, Dell's most notable and prolific title was the anthology Four Color. Published several times a month, the title (which primarily consisted of standalone issues featuring various licensed properties) saw more than 1,300 issues published in its 23-year history. It often served as a try-out title (much like DC's Showcase) and thus the launching pad for many long-running series, a number of which (such as The Twilight Zone) were continued not by Dell, but Gold Key Comics, the competing company formed when Western ended its partnership (see below).

=== Lil' Eightball ===
Responding to pressure from the African-American community, the character Lil' Eightball (who appeared in a handful of Walter Lantz cartoons in the late 1930s and in those initial appearances constituted what animation and comics historian Michael Barrier described as being a "grotesquely stereotypical black boy") was discontinued as one of the featured characters in the Lantz anthology comic book New Funnies; the last appearance of the character was in the August 1947 issue.

=== Fredric Wertham ===
In 1948, Dell refused an invitation of membership in the nascent Association of Comics Magazine Publishers. The association had been formed to pre-empt government intervention in the face of mounting public criticism of comic books. Dell vice-president Helen Meyer told Congress that Dell had opted out of the association because they didn't want their less controversial offerings to serve as "an umbrella for the crime comic publishers". When the Comics Code was formed in 1954 in reaction to Wertham's Seduction of the Innocent, Dell again refused to join and instead began publishing in its comics a "Pledge to Parents" that promised their editorial process "eliminates, rather than regulates, objectional [sic] material" and concluded with the now classic credo "Dell Comics Are Good Comics."

Bart Beaty in his book Fredric Wertham and the Critique of Mass Culture describes a concerted campaign by Dell against publication of Wertham's Seduction of the Innocent to the extent of recruiting several of the companies that it licensed characters from (including Warner Brother Cartoons, the Lone Ranger Inc. and Edgar Rice Burroughs Inc.) to send letters of protest to Wertham's publisher Stanley Rinehart.

Dell in this period even burnished its image by taking out full-page ads in the Saturday Evening Post in late 1952 and early 1953 that emphasized the wholesomeness of its comics.

=== Dell Comics Club and subscription promotions ===
From mid-1950 to Spring 1959 Dell promoted subscriptions to its non-Disney titles with what it called the Dell Comics Club. Membership was automatic with any one year subscription to such titles and came with a certificate of membership plus a group portrait of the most prominent non-Disney characters published by Dell. Dell also offered various subscription premiums during the 1940s and 1950s (in some cases these were prints of covers or other character artwork and in one instance a cel from a Warner Brothers cartoon) in what Mark Evanier has dubbed a coordinated concerted "aggressive subscription push" and offered the option of an illustrated note or card be sent to the recipients of a gift subscription for birthdays or Christmas.

Multi-year subscriptions were also available (in the case of Walt Disney's Comics and Stories, at one point in the 1940s subscriptions for up to five years were offered).

=== Alternate format ===
In 1961, Dell issued two atypical, comic-book like paperbacks without coloring, with cardboard covers and heavier-weight paper than standard comics, and selling for one dollar when most comic books were 12 cents: the 116-page The Flintstones on the Rocks and the 117-page Huck & Yogi Jamboree One historian describes the latter as "a collection of drawings with text (there's not a word balloon to be found). But there are drawings that are sequential which tell stories.... [T]his was intended for Huck and Yogi's adult fans. Of which there apparently were more than a few, given the format and high price — $1!"

== Corporate acquisitions ==
Dell was acquired by Doubleday in 1976. Doubleday was acquired by Bertelsmann in 1986, who formed Bantam Doubleday Dell as its US subsidiary. Bertelsmann acquired Random House in 1998 and renamed its US business after the acquisition. After the merger, Bantam was merged with Dell Publishing. In 2001, Random House purchased Golden Books' book publishing properties effectively reuniting the remnants of Dell and Western Publishing. Bantam Dell became part of the Random House publishing group in 2008. Ballantine Books was merged with Bantam Dell in 2010. In 2013, Random House merged with Penguin to form Penguin Random House.

== Fan revivals ==
After Dell ceased publication, a number of its obscure characters were brought back in independent comics. In August 2016, InDELLible Comics was formed in tribute to the public domain characters orphaned by Dell. In July 2017, All-New Popular Comics #1 was published, and was #1 in its category on Amazon upon release. Founded and edited by the team of Jim Ludwig, David Noe and Dærick Gröss Sr., the first issue featured some original characters as well as stories and cameos with many Dell characters.

== Publications ==
=== # ===
- 1000 Jokes #14—129 (1938–May 1969)
- 12 O'Clock High #1–2 (March–April 1965)
- 6 Black Horses (January 1963)
- 87th Precinct #2 (July-September 1962)

=== A ===
- Abraham Lincoln Life Story #1 (March 1958)
- Adlai Stevenson (1900–1965) (December 1966)
- Adventures of Mighty Mouse #144–155 (October–December 1959–July-September 1962)
- Air War Stories #1–8 (November 1964–August 1966)
- Alley Oop #1–2 (December 1962-February 1963–September-November 1963)
- Alvin #1–28 (October 1962–October 1973)
- Alvin and His Pals in Merry Christmas with Clyde Crashup and Leonardo (December 1963-February 1964)
- Alvin for President #1 (August-October 1964)
- America in Action #1 (Winter 1945)
- Animal Comics #1–30 (1942–December 1947)
- Around the Block with Dunc and Loo #1–3 (October-December 1961–April-June 1962) (Note: Continued from #4 as Dunc and Loo.)
- Around the World Under the Sea (December 1966)

=== B ===
- Bachelor Father #2 (September-November 1962)
- Barbie and Ken #1–5 (May 1962–November 1963)
- Barry M. Goldwater (March 1965)
- Bat Masterson #2—9 (February 1960–January 1962)
- Battle of the Bulge (June 1966)
- Beach Blanket Bingo (September 1965)
- Beany and Cecil #1–5 (July 1962–September 1963)
- The Beatles (September-November 1964)
- Beep Beep – The Road Runner #4–14 (February-April 1960–August-October 1962) (Note: Later continued by Gold Key.)
- Ben Casey #1–10 (July 1962–August 1965)
- Beetle Bailey #5–38 (February-April 1956–May-July 1962) (Note: Continued by Gold Key from #39.)
- The Beverly Hillbillies #1–21 (April 1963–October 1971)
- Bewitched #1–14 (April 1965–October 1969)
- The Big Valley #1–6 (June 1966–October 1969)
- The Blue Phantom (June-August 1962)
- Bon Voyage! (December 1962)
- Bonanza (2 issues, May-July 1962–August-October 1962)
- Bozo the Clown #2–7 (July-September 1951–October–December 1962)
- Bozo: The World's Most Famous Clown #1–4 (May-July 1962–October-December 1963)
- The Brady Bunch #1–2 (February–May 1970)
- Brain Boy #2–6 (September 1962–November 1963)
- Brenda Starr, Reporter #1 (October 1963)
- Buck Jones #2–8 (April-June 1951–October-December 1952)
- Buffalo Bill, Jr. #7–13 (April 1958–October 1959)
- Bugs Bunny #28–85 (December 1952-January 1953–July-September 1962) (Note: Continued by Gold Key from #86.)
- Bugs Bunny's Christmas Funnies #1–9 (November 1950–December 1958)
- Bugs Bunny's Christmas Party #6 (November 1955)
- Bugs Bunny's County Fair #1 (September 1957)
- Bugs Bunny's Halloween Parade #1–2 (October 1953–October 1954)
- Bugs Bunny's Trick 'N' Treat Halloween Fun #3–4 (October 1955–October 1956)
- Bugs Bunny's Vacation Funnies #1–9 (July 1951–1959)
- Bullwinkle (July-September 1962)
- The Bullwinkle Mother Moose Nursery Pomes (May-July 1962)
- Burke's Law #1–3 (May 1964–March 1965)

=== C ===
- Cadet Gray of West Point #1 (April 1958)
- Cain's Hundred #1–2 (May–September 1962)
- Calvin and the Colonel #2 (July–September 1962)
- Camp Runamuck #1 (April 1966)
- Car 54, Where Are You? #2–7 (August 1962–November 1963)
- The Castilian (January 1964)
- The Cat (December 1966)
- Charlie Chan #1–2 (October-December 1965–March 1966)
- Charlie McCarthy #1–9 (March-May 1949–July 1952)
- Cheyenne #4–25 (October 1957–January 1962)
- Cheyenne Autumn (June 1965)
- The Chief #2 (April-June 1951) (Note: Continued from #3 as Indian Chief.)
- Chip 'n' Dale #4–30 (December 1955-February 1956–June-August 1962)
- Christmas in Disneyland #1 (December 1957)
- A Christmas Treasury #1 (November 1954)
- Cicero's Cat #1–2 (July-August 1959–September-October 1959)
- Cimarron Strip #1 (January 1968)
- Circus World (September 1964)
- The Cisco Kid #2–41 (January 1951–October 1958)
- Clyde Crashcup #1–5 (August 1963–November 1964)
- Colt .45 #4–9 (February 1963–June 1961)
- Combat #1–40 (October-November 1961–October 1973)
- Comic Album #1–18 (March-May 1958–June-August 1962)
- The Comics #1–11 (March 1937–November 1938)
- Countdown (October 1967)
- The Courtship of Eddie's Father #1–2 (January–May 1970)
- Crackajack Funnies #1–43 (June 1938–January 1942)
- The Creature (February 1963)

=== D ===
- Daffy Duck #4–30 (January-March 1956–July-September 1962) (Note: Continued by Gold Key from #31.)
- Daktari #1–4 (July 1967–October 1969)
- David Ladd's Life Story (October-December 1962)
- Davy Crockett: King of the Wild Frontier #1 (September 1955)
- Dazey's Diary #1 (June-August 1962)
- The Defenders #1–2 (November 1962–April 1963)
- Dell Giant #21–55 (September 1959–September 1962)
- Dell Junior Treasury #1–10 (January 1955–October 1957)
- Die, Monster, Die! (March 1966)
- The Dirty Dozen (October 1967)
- Disneyland Birthday Party #1 (October 1958)
- Diver Dan #2 (June–August 1962)
- Donald and Mickey in Disneyland #1 (May 1958)
- Donald Duck #26–84 (November 1952–September-November 1962) (Note: Continued by Gold Key from #85.)
- Donald Duck Album #1 (May-July 1962)
- Donald Duck Beach Party #1–6 (July 1954–August 1959)
- Donald Duck Fun Book (1953–October 1954)
- Donald Duck in Disneyland #1 (September 1955)
- Dr. Kildare #2—9 (July-September 1962—April-June 1965)
- Dr. Who and the Daleks (December 1966)
- Dracula (October-December 1962)
- Dracula #2–4 (November 1966–March 1967)
- Drift Marlo #1–2 (June–December 1962)
- Dunc and Loo #4–8 (July-August 1962–October-December 1963)
- Dwight D. Eisenhower #1 (December 1969)

=== E ===
- El Dorado (October 1967)
- Ensign O'Toole #1–2 (August-October 1963–1964)
- Ensign Pulver (October 1964)
- Espionage #1–2 (May-July 1964–October 1964)

=== F ===
- F-Troop #1–7 (August 1966—August 1967)
- The F.B.I. (April-June 1965)
- Fairy Tale Parade #1–9 (June-July 1942–November 1943-January 1944)
- Famous Feature Stories #1 (1938)
- Famous Indian Tribes #1–2 (September 1962–July 1972)
- Famous Stories #1–2 (1942)
- Felix the Cat (series 1) #1–19 (February-March 1948–February-March 1951) (Note: Continued by Toby Press from #20.)
- Felix the Cat (series 2) #1–12 (September-November 1962–July-September 1965)
- Flash Gordon #2 (May-July 1953)
- The Flintstones #2–6 (December 1961–July 1962) (Note: Continued by Gold Key from #7.)
- The Flintstones on the Rocks (1961)
- The Flying A's Range Rider #2–24 (June 1953–December 1958)
- The Flying Nun #1–4 (February–November 1968)
- Flying Saucers Comics #1–5 (April 1967–October 1969)
- Follow the Sun #1–2 (July–November 1962)
- Four Color (series 1) #1–25 (July–September 1939–1942)
- Four Color (series 2) #1–1354 (June 1942–April–June 1962)
- Frankenstein (March-May 1963)
- Frankenstein 2—4 (September 1966–March 1967)
- Freddy #1–3 (May-July 1963–October–December 1964)
- Friday Foster #1 (October 1972)
- The Frogmen #2–11 (May-July 1962–November 1964-January 1965)
- The Funnies (series 1) #1–36 (April 1929–October 1930)
- The Funnies (series 2) #1–64 (October 1936–May 1942)
- Fury (June–August 1962)

=== G ===
- Gang Busters #10, #17 (1939–1941)
- Garrison's Gorillas #1–5 (January 1968–October 1969)
- Gene Autry Comics #1–121 issues (May 1946–March 1959) (Note: Continued from #102 as Gene Autry and Champion.)
- Gene Autry's Champion #3–19 (October 1951–October 1955)
- Gentle Ben #1–5 (February 1968–October 1969)
- Gerald McBoing Boing and the Nearsighted Mr. Magoo #1–6 (5 issues, October 1952-October 1953) (Note: Continued from #6 as Mr. Magoo and Gerald McBoing Boing.)
- Get Smart #1–8 (June 1966-September 1967)
- Ghost Stories #1–37 (November 1962–October 1973) (Note: Issue #1 only written by John Stanley.)
- Gidget #1–2 (April–December 1966)
- Gil Thorp #1 (May-July 1963)
- Golden West Rodeo Treasury #1 (October 1957)
- Goofy (September-November 1962)
- The Great Race (March 1966)
- Guerrilla War #12–14 (July-December 1965–March 1966)
- Gulliver's Travels #1 (September-November 1965)
- Gunsmoke #6–27 (November 1957-January 1958–June-July 1961)
- Gyro Gearloose #1 (May–July 1962)

=== H ===
- The Hallelujah Trail (February 1966)
- Hatari! (January 1963)
- Have Gun, Will Travel #4–14 (January 1960–September 1962)
- Heckle and Jeckle #1–3 (May–November 1966)
- Henry #1–65 (January-March 1948–June 1961)
- Henry Aldrich #1–22 (August 1950–September-November 1954)
- Hogan's Heroes #1–9 (June 1966–October 1969)
- Hope Ship (June-August 1963)
- The Horizontal Lieutenant (October 1962)
- Howdy Doody #1–38 (January 1950—July-September 1956)
- Huck and Yogi Jamboree (March 1961)
- Huckleberry Hound #3–17 (January-February 1960–June-August 1962) (Note: Continued by Gold Key from #18.)
- Huey, Dewey and Louie Back to School #1 (September 1958)

=== I ===
- I Dream of Jeannie #1–2 (April–December 1966)
- I Love Lucy #3—35 (August 1954–April 1962)
- I'm Dickens, He's Fenster #1–2 (July–October 1963)
- Idaho #1–8 (July 1963–September 1965)
- The Incredible Mr. Limpet (August 1964)
- Indian Chief #3–33 (September 1951–January 1959)
- Iron Horse #1–2 (March–June 1967)
- Ivanhoe #1 (September 1963)

=== J ===
- Jace Pearson of the Texas Rangers #2–9 (July 1953-April 1955)
- Jace Pearson's Tales of the Texas Rangers #11–20 (May 1956-August 1958)
- Jack the Giant Killer (January 1963)
- Jason and the Argonauts (October 1963)
- John F. Kennedy (1917–1963) (August-October 1964)
- Johnny Jason, Teen Reporter (June-August 1962)
- Johnny Mack Brown #2–10 (December 1950-November 1952)
- Jungle Jim #3–19 (December 1954–March 1959)
- Jungle War Stories #1–11 (September 1962–August 1965) (Note: Continued from #12 as Guerilla War.)

=== K ===
- King Leonardo and His Short Subjects (May-June 1962)
- King of Diamonds #1 (July-September 1962)
- King of the Royal Mounted #8–28 (June-August 1952–March-May 1958)
- Kit Karter #1 (May-July 1962)
- Knights of the Round Table #1 (November 1963-January 1964)
- Kona, Monarch of Monster Isle #2–21 (July 1962–March 1967)
- Kookie #1–2 (February-April 1962–May-July 1962)
- Krazy Kat #1–5 (May-June 1951–August-October 1952)

=== L ===
- Lady and the Tramp #1 (June 1955)
- Lancelot and Guinevere (October 1963)
- Large Feature Comics #1–27 (March 1942–1943)
- Lassie #1–58 (October 1950—July 1962)
- Laurel and Hardy (August-October 1962)
- Laurel and Hardy #2–4 (March-May 1963–September-November 1963)
- Lawman #3–11 (February 1960–April 1962)
- Lawrence of Arabia (August 1963)
- Leave It to Beaver (May-July 1962)
- The Legend of Custer #1 (January 1968)
- The Lieutenant #1 (April-June 1964)
- Life Stories of American Presidents #1 (November 1957)
- Linda Lark #1–8 (October-December 1961–August-October 1963)
- Lion of Sparta (January 1963)
- Little Beaver #3–8 (October-December 1951–January-March 1953)
- Little Iodine #1–50 (March-May 1950–October-December 1960)
- Little Lulu #1–164 (January-February 1948–July-September 1962) — later continued by Western, et al.
- Little Lulu and Her Friends #4 (March 1956)
- Little Lulu and Her Special Friends #3 (March 1955)
- Little Lulu and Tubby at Summer Camp #2, #5 (October 1957 October 1958)
- Little Lulu on Vacation #1 (July 1954)
- Little Lulu Tubby Annual #1–2 (March 1953–March 1954)
- Little Orphan Annie #1–3 (March-May 1948–September-November 1948)
- The Little Scouts #2–6 (October-December 1951–October-December 1952)
- The Littlest Snowman (December 1963-February 1964)
- Lobo #1–2 (December 1965–October 1966)
- Lolly and Pepper #1 (May-July 1962)
- The Lone Ranger #1–145 (January-February 1948–May-July 1962)
- The Lone Ranger Movie Story (March 1956)
- The Lone Ranger's Companion Tonto #1–33 (August-October 1951–November 1958-January 1959)
- The Lone Ranger's Famous Horse Hi-Yo Silver #3–36 (July 1952–October-December 1960)
- The Lone Ranger's Golden West #3 (August 1955)
- The Lone Ranger's Western Treasury #1–2 (September 1953–August 1954) (Note: Continued from #3 as The Lone Ranger's Golden West.)
- Looney Tunes #166–246 (August 1955–July-September 1962) (Note: Continued by Western, et al.)
- Looney Tunes and Merrie Melodies Comics #1–165 (1941–July 1955) (Note: Continued from #166 as Looney Tunes.)
- Ludwig Von Drake #1–4 (November 1963-June 1962)
- Lulu and Alvin Storytelling Time #1 (March 1959)
- Lulu and Tubby Halloween Fun #2, #6 (October 1957–October 1958)
- Lulu and Tubby in Alaska #1 (July 1959)
- Lulu and Tubby in Japan (May-July 1962)
- Lyndon B. Johnson #1 (March 1965)

=== M ===
- Mad Monster Party? (September 1967)
- The Magic Sword (September 1962)
- Man from Wells Fargo (May-July 1962)
- Margie #2 (July-September 1962)
- The Masque of the Red Death (October 1964)
- Maverick #7–19 (October 1959-June 1962)
- Maya (December 1966)
- McHale's Navy #1–3 (May 1963–November 1963)
- McHale's Navy (film adaptation) (October 1964)
- McKeever and the Colonel #1–3 (February–October 1963)
- Melvin Monster #1–10 (April 1963–October 1969)
- Merrill's Marauders (January 1963)
- Mickey Mouse #28–84 (December 1952–July-September 1962) (Note: Continued by Gold Key from #85.)
- Mickey Mouse Album (August-October 1962)
- Mickey Mouse Almanac #1 (December 1957)
- Mickey Mouse Birthday Party #1 (September 1953)
- Mickey Mouse Club Parade #1 (December 1955)
- Mickey Mouse in Fantasyland #1 (May 1957)
- Mickey Mouse Summer Fun #1 (August 1958) (Note: Continued from #2 as Walt Disney's Summer Fun.)
- Mike Shayne, Private Eye #1–3 (November 1962–May 1963)
- The Mighty Heroes #1–4 (March–July 1967)
- Mighty Mouse #161–172 (March 1966–October 1968)
- Miss Peach #1 (October-December 1963)
- Mission: Impossible #1–5 (May 1967–October 1969)
- Millie the Lovable Monster #1–6 (September-November 1962–January 1973)
- Mister Magoo #3–5 (March–September 1963)
- The Mod Squad #1–8 (January 1969–April 1971)
- The Monkees #1–17 (March 1967–October 1969)
- The Monroes #1 (April 1967)
- Monsterville #1 (1962)
- Moon Mullins #29 (1942)
- Moses and the Ten Commandments (August 1957)
- Mouse Musketeers #8–21 (June 1957–May 1960)
- The Mouse on the Moon (October 1963)
- Mr. Magoo and Gerald McBoing Boing #6 (June 1954)
- The Mummy (November 1962)
- The Music Man (January 1963)
- Mysterious Isle #1 (November 1963-January 1964)

=== N ===
- The Naked Prey (December 1966)
- Nancy and Sluggo #146–187 (September 1957–April 1962) (Note: Continued from St. John Publications from #145; continued by Gold Key from #188.)
- Nancy and Sluggo Travel Time #1 (September 1958)
- Nanny and the Professor #1–2 (August–October 1970)
- National Velvet (2 issues, May-July 1962–August-October 1962)
- Naza, Stone Age Warrior #1–9 (November 1963–March 1966)
- Neutro #1 (January 1967)
- New Funnies #65–288 (July 1942–April 1962)
- The New People #1–2 (January–May 1970)
- New Terrytoons #1–8 (August 1960–May 1962)
- Nickel Comics #1 (1938)
- The Night of the Grizzly (December 1966)
- No Time for Sergeants #1–3 (February-April 1965–August-October 1965)
- None but the Brave (June 1965)
- Nukla #1–4 (October 1965–September 1966)

=== O ===
- Operation Bikini (October 1963)
- Operation Crossbow (December 1965)
- Our Gang Comics #1–59 (October 1942–June 1949)
- The Outer Limits #1–18 (March 1963–October 1969)

=== P ===
- Peanuts #4—13 (February 1960–May 1962)
- Perry Mason #1–2 (June-August 1964–October-December 1964)
- Peter Pan Treasure Chest #1 (January 1953)
- Petticoat Junction #1–5 (December 1964–October 1965)
- Pixie and Dixie and Mr. Jinks #1 (May-July 1962)
- Pogo Possum #1–16 (December 1949–June 1954)
- Pogo Parade #1 (September 1953)
- Ponytail #1–12 (September 1962–December 1965) (Note: Continued by Charlton from #13.)
- Popeye #1–65 (February-April 1948–July-September 1962) (Note: Continued by Gold Key from #66.)
- Popular Comics #1–145 (February 1936–September 1948)
- Porky Pig #25–81 (December 1952–April 1962)
- The Prince and the Pauper (May-July 1962)
- Private Secretary #1–2 (December-February 1963–March-May 1963)

=== Q ===
- Queen of the West — Dale Evans #3–22 (July 1954–March 1959)
- Quick Draw McGraw #2–11 (April-June 1960—July 1962) (Note: Continued by Gold Key from #12.)

=== R ===
- Raggedy Ann and Andy (series 1) #1–39 (June 1946–August 1949)
- Raggedy Ann and Andy (series 2) #1–4 (December 1964–March 1966)
- Raggedy Ann and Andy #1 (February 1955)
- Rango #1 (August 1967)
- The Rat Patrol #1–6 (March 1967–October 1969)
- The Raven (September 1963)
- Rawhide (June-August 1962)
- The Real McCoys (May 1962)
- Red Ryder #1–151 (September 1940–June 1957)
- Rex Allen #2–31 (September-November 1951–December 1958-February 1959)
- The Rifleman #2–12 (January 1960–July 1962) (Note: Continued by Gold Key from #13.)
- Rin Tin Tin #4–38 (May 1953–July 1961)
- Ring of Bright Water (October 1969)
- Robin Hood #1 (May-July 1963)
- Robinson Crusoe #1 (November 1963-January 1964)
- Room 222 #1–4 (January 1970-January 1971)
- Rootie Kazootie #4–6 (June–December 1954)
- Roy Rogers and Trigger #92–145 (August 1955–September-October 1961)
- Roy Rogers Comics #1–91 (January 1948–July 1955) (Note: Continued from #92 as Roy Rogers and Trigger.)
- Roy Rogers' Trigger #2–17 (September-November 1951–June-August 1955)
- Ruff and Reddy #4–12 (January-March 1960–January-March 1962)
- The Runaway (December 1964)

=== S ===
- Santa Claus Conquers the Martians (March 1966)
- Santa Claus Funnies #1 (November 1952)
- Scamp #5–16 (March-May 1958–December 1960-February 1961)
- Sea Hunt #4–13 (March 1960–June 1962)
- Sergeant Preston of the Yukon #5–29 (January 1953–January 1959)
- Silly Symphonies #1–9 (September 1952–February 1959)
- Sinbad Jr. #1–3 (September 1965–May 1966)
- Ski Party (November 1965)
- Sleeping Beauty #1 (April 1959)
- Smilin' Jack #1–8 (March 1938-December 1949)
- Smitty #1–7 (April 1948-October 1949)
- Smoky (February 1967)
- The Sons of Katie Elder (November 1965)
- Space Man #2–10 (May 1962-October 1972)
- Spike and Tyke #4–24 (February 1956–February 1961)
- Spin and Marty #5–9 (May 1958–August 1959)
- Stoney Burke #1–2 (August–November 1963)
- Super Comics #1–121 (May 1938–February 1949)
- Super Heroes #1–4 (1967) (Note: Featuring the "Fab 4", a superhero team unrelated to the Beatles.)

=== T ===
- Tales from the Tomb #1 (October 1962)
- Tales of Terror (February 1963)
- Tales of the Green Beret #1–5 (5 issues, January 1966-October 1969)
- Target: The Corruptors! #2–3 (June-August 1962–October-December 1962)
- Tarzan #1–131 (January 1948–September 1962)
- Tarzan's Jungle Annual #1–7 (1952–September 1958)
- T.H.E. Cat #1–4 (March–October 1997)
- Thirteen Going on Eighteen #1–29 (1961–1971) — written by John Stanley
- The Three Stooges #6–9 (November 1961–August 1962) (Note: Continued by Gold Key from #10.)
- The Three Stooges Meet Hercules (August 1962)
- Tiny Tots Comics #1 (1943)
- Toka, Jungle King #1–10 (October 1964–January 1967)
- Tom and Jerry Comics #60–212 (July 1949–July 1962) (Note: Continued by Gold Key from #213.)
- Tom and Jerry Picnic Time #1 (July 1958)
- Tom and Jerry Summer Fun #1–2 (July 1954–July 1955) (Note: Continued from #3 as Tom and Jerry's Summer Fun.)
- Tom and Jerry Winter Carnival #1–2 (December 1952–December 1953) (Note: Continued from #3 as Tom and Jerry's Winter Fun.)
- Tom and Jerry's Back to School #1 (September 1956)
- Tom and Jerry's Summer Fun #3–4 (July 1956–July 1957)
- Tom and Jerry's Toy Fair #1 (June 1958)
- Tom and Jerry's Winter Fun #3–7 (December 1954–November 1958)
- Tom Corbett, Space Cadet #4–11 (November 1953-September 1954)
- The Tomb of Ligeia (June 1965)
- Top Cat #1–3 (December 1961–June 1962) (Note: Continued by Gold Key from #4.)
- Treasure Island (July-September 1962)
- A Treasury of Dogs #1 (October 1956)
- A Treasury of Horses #1 (September 1955)
- Tubby #5–49 (July 1953–December 1961-February 1962)
- Tubby and His Clubhouse Pals #1 (October 1956)
- Turok, Son of Stone #3–29 (March-May 1956–September-November 1962) (Note: Continued by Gold Key from #30.)
- TV's New Adventures of Pinocchio #1–3 (October 1962–1963)
- Tweety and Sylvester #4–37 (March 1954-June 1962)
- Twice-Told Tales (January 1964)
- The Twist (September 1962)
- Two on a Guillotine (June 1965)

=== U ===
- Uncle Scrooge #4–39 (February 1954–November 1962)
- Uncle Scrooge Goes to Disneyland #1 (August 1957)
- Universal Pictures Presents Dracula, The Mummy Plus Other Stories (September-November 1963)
- The Untouchables (July–August 1962)
- U.S.A. ..is Ready! (1941)

=== V ===
- The Valley of Gwangi (December 1969)
- Voyage to the Deep #1–4 (September 1966-January 1964)

=== W ===
- Wagon Train #4–13 (March 1966-April 1962)
- Walt Disney Presents #2–6 (February 1960–December 1961)
- Walt Disney's Christmas Parade #1–9 (November 1949–December 1958)
- Walt Disney's Comics and Stories #1–263 (October 1940–July 1962)
- Walt Disney's Picnic Party #6–8 (July 1955–July 1957)
- Walt Disney's Summer Fun #2 (August 1959)
- Walt Disney's Vacation Parade #1–5 (July 1950–July 1954)
- Walt Disney's Zorro #8–15 (December 1959–September 1961)
- War Comics #1–4 (1940-1941)
- War Heroes #1–10 (September 1942-December 1944)
- The War Wagon (September 1967)
- War-Gods of the Deep (September 1965)
- Werewolf #1–3 (December 1966–April 1967)
- Western Action Thrillers #1 (April 1937)
- Western Roundup #1–25 (June 1952–January-March 1959)
- Who's Minding the Mint? (August 1967)
- Wild Bill Elliott Comics #2–17 (November 1950-June 1955)
- Winnie Winkle #1–7 (May 1948–November 1949)
- The Wolf Man (August 1963)
- Woody Woodpecker #16–72 (December 1952–May-July 1962) (Note: Continued by Gold Key from #73.)
- Woody Woodpecker's Back to School #1–6 (October 1952–October 1957)
- Woody Woodpecker's County Fair #2–5 (November 1958–September 1956)
- World War Stories #1–3 (April–December 1965)
- Wyatt Earp #4–13 (September 1958–December 1960)

=== Y ===
- Yogi Bear #4–9 (September 1961–June-September 1962) (Note: Continued by Gold Key from #10.)
- The Young Lawyers #1–2 (January–April 1971)
- The Young Rebels #1 (January 1971)

=== Z ===
- Zane Grey's Stories of the West #27–39 (September 1955–November 1958)
- Zulu (August 1964)

== Works cited ==
- Kidman, Shawna (2019). Comic Books Incorporated: How the Business of Comics Became the Business of Hollywood. University of California Press. ISBN 9780520297562.
