= Chintaman Ganesh Temple, Ujjain =

Hindu temple in Madhya Pradesh, India

Coordinates: 23.1467°N 75.7391°E

Chintaman Ganesh Temple

Religion
- Affiliation: Hinduism
- District: Ujjain
- Deity: Lord Ganesha

Location
- Location: Fatehabad
- State: Madhya Pradesh
- Country: India
- Interactive map of Chintaman Ganesh Temple

Chintaman Ganesh is the biggest temple of Lord Ganesha in Ujjain of Madhya Pradesh, India. This temple is built across the Kshipra river on the Fatehabad railway line, and is located about 7 km far south-westerly to the Ujjain town. The temple is located now in the middle of the town's market.

The Ganesha idol enshrined in this temple is supposed to be swayamabhu (self manifested). Locally, Ganesha is also referred to as Chintaman. His consorts, Ridhhi and Siddhi, flank Chintaman, the assuager of all worries.

== Religious significance ==
The temple deity Lord Ganesha is regarded as the Lord of beginnings as per the Hindu beliefs. In the traditional times, the Lord is known as Chintaharan which literally means remover of all worries and tensions. The temple is thronged by crowds of people that come to do away with all their worries at the shrine of the Lord. The term Chintamani is another name used for Lord Vishnu, who is considered as the preserver of the Universe as per Hindu Mythology. Also called Vighneshwara, the moderator of grief, Ganesha is always the first to be worshipped in the Hindu pantheon, lest he decide to sow obstacles in the devotees' path.

== History ==
The temple dates back to 11th and 12th centuries when the Paramaras ruled over Malwa. It is also believed that the original temple dates back to the Ramayan age and the temple is stablished by Sita.

== Architecture ==
The finely carved stone pillars in the assembly hall and the white shrine define the age-old sanctity of the temple.

== See also ==
- Ancient monuments in Ujjain
- Ujjain
- Mangalnath Temple
- Kal Bhairav Temple, Ujjain
- Mahakaleshwar Jyotirlinga
