= Mangalnath Temple =

Hindu temple in Madhya Pradesh, India

The Mangalnath Temple is a Hindu temple located in the Ujjain city of Madhya Pradesh. It is dedicated to Mahadeva, the guardian deity of the city. Located on the banks of the Shipra River, it is one of the most active temples in the city, visited by hundreds of devotees daily. It is regarded as the birthplace of Mars (mangala in Hindi), according to the Matsya Purana. Famous for a clear view of the planet and hence suitable for astronomical studies. It is believed to be situated at the center of the Earth according to the Matsya Purana. Mahant Rajendra Bharti is the official of the Mangalnath Temple. This temple is famous for magal dosh nivaran Bhaat Puja.

== Connectivity ==
By Air - The nearest air port is Devi Ahilyabai Holkar Airport, Indore which is at a distance of 53 kilometer from the temple. The airport receives flights from many major city of the country.

By road - There are regular bus services which connects Ujjain with many cities of the state and country.

By train - Ujjain has a railway station as a part of Western Railway Zone. The code of the station is UJN. Trains are easily available here for many big cities.

== See also ==
- Ujjain
- Chintaman Ganesh Temple, Ujjain
- Mahakaleshwar Jyotirlinga
- Kal Bhairav Temple, Ujjain
