= Ancient monuments in Ujjain =

Ujjain is an ancient city of central India, in the Malwa region of the Indian state of Madhya Pradesh, on the eastern bank of the Kshipra River.

Following is a list of ancient monuments in Ujjain.

== The Temples ==
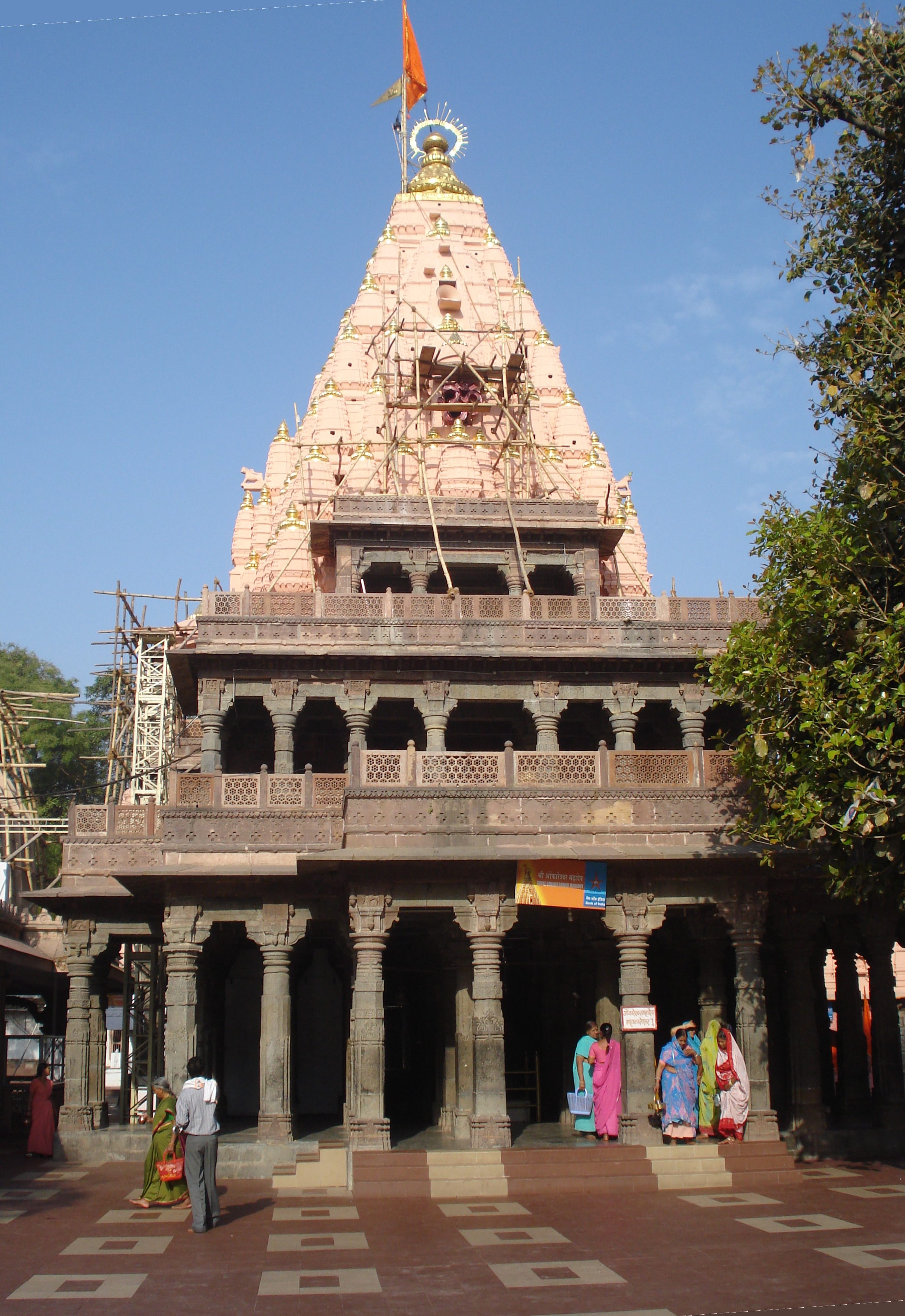
Mahakal Temple Ujjain

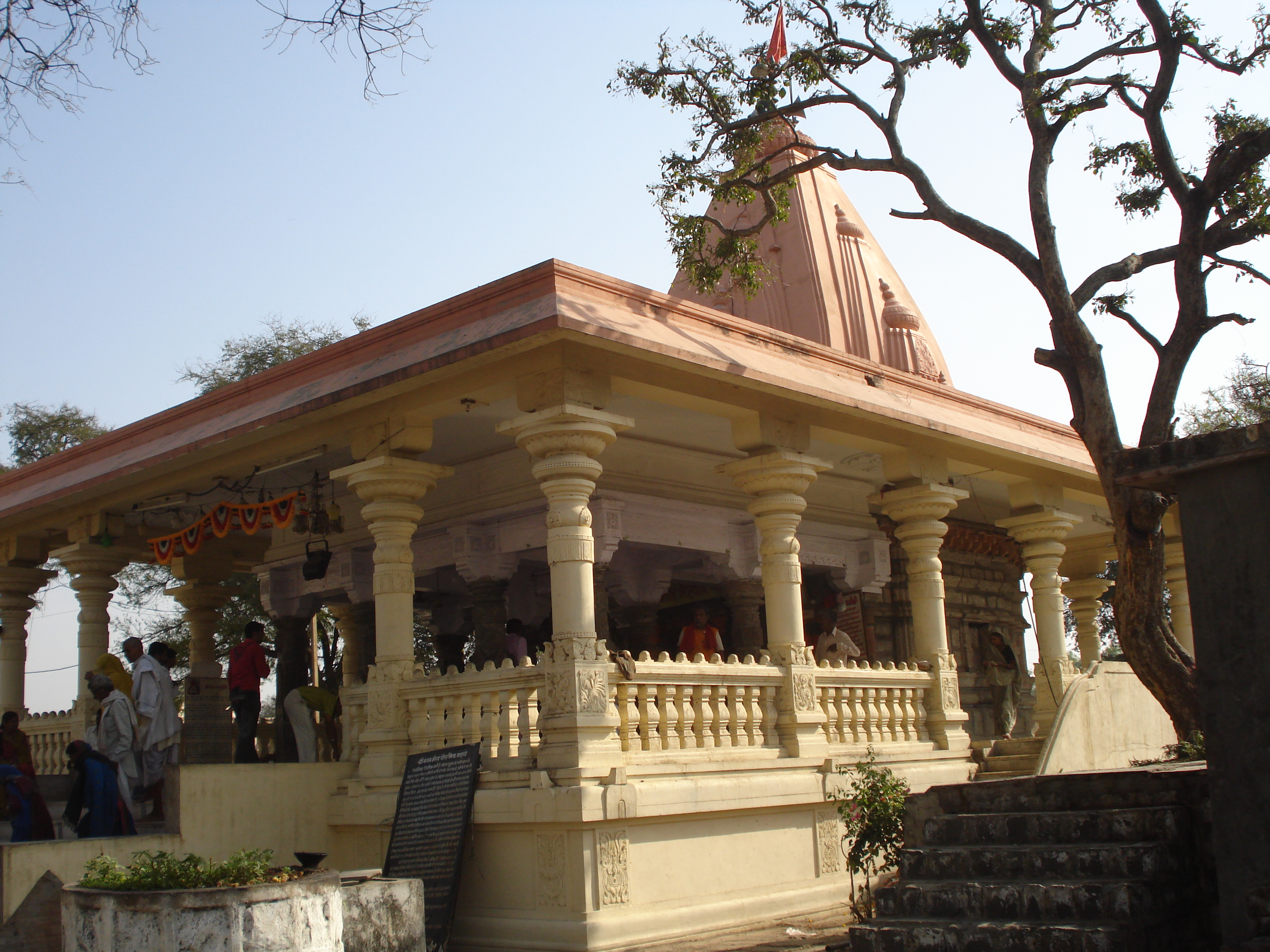
Kalabhairava Temple Ujjain

=== Mahakaleshwar Jyotirlinga Temple ===
Mahakaleshwar Jyotirlinga is a famous Hindu temple dedicated to Shiva.

Shrimant Ranojirao Shinde the founder of Scindia dynasty in northern India, renovated the Famous jyotirling temple of Shri Mahakaaleshwar, Harsidhdhi Mandir, Sidhdhha Vat ghat, Ram ghat, Mangalnath and many more in the city, which was capital of his Kingdom. Mahadji Shinde constructed Gopal Mandir, which was later on reconstructed by Maharani Bayzabai Raje Shinde. Shrimant Bayzabai also developed the city by developing Daulatganj. Maharajah Shrimant Jayaajirao Saheb Shinde (II) (1843 - 1886 CE) also developed Ujjain by developing Nai Sadak, Sarafa Bazar, Ghasmandi and other areas of the city. The last ruler of Scindia Dynasty Maharaja Jiwajirao Shinde constructed Chhatri Chowk, Madhav College, and Achyutanand Vyayamshala (with Pustake and Dingre). Jiwaji Rao Shinde also reconstructed Maharaj Vada in 1940 CE near Shri Mahakaaleshwar Temple which was originally built by Ranojirao Shinde in 1732 CE and further developments were made by Shreenath Mahadji Shinde from 1764 to 1794 CE.

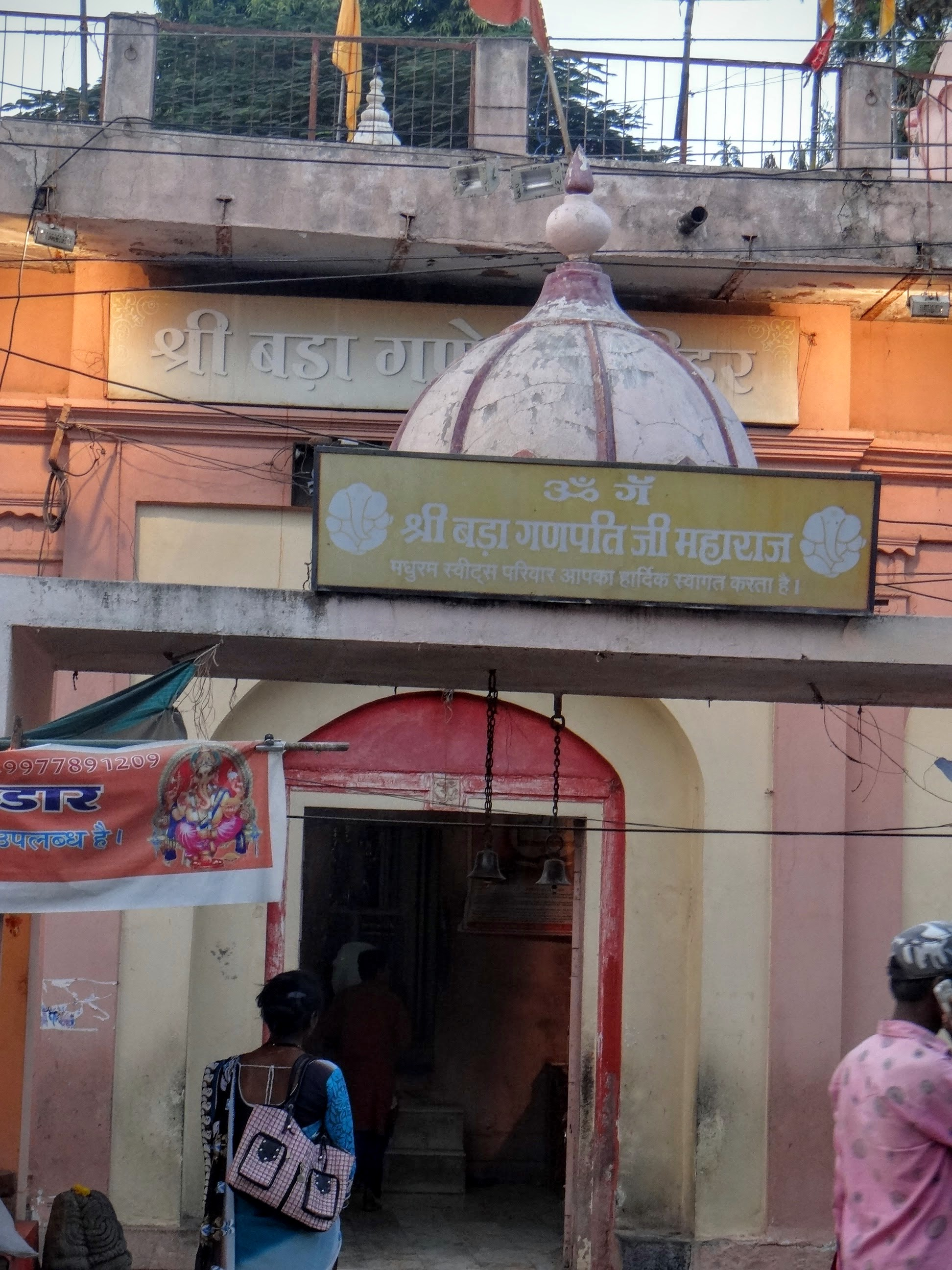
Bade Ganeshji

=== Chintaman Ganesh temple ===
Chintaman Ganesh Ujjain.

Chintaman means "the assurer of freedom from worldly anxieties". This temple is built across the Shipra(Kshipra) river on the Fatehabad railway line. The Ganesh idol in this temple is supposed to be swayambhu - born of itself. Riddhi and Siddhi, the consorts of Ganesha, are seated on either side of Ganesha. The temple is considered to be of considerable antiquity. The artistically carved pillars in the assembly hall date back to the Paramara period. The temple is about 15 km from the main city. Every Wednesday people come for special darshana.

=== Harsidhhi Temple ===
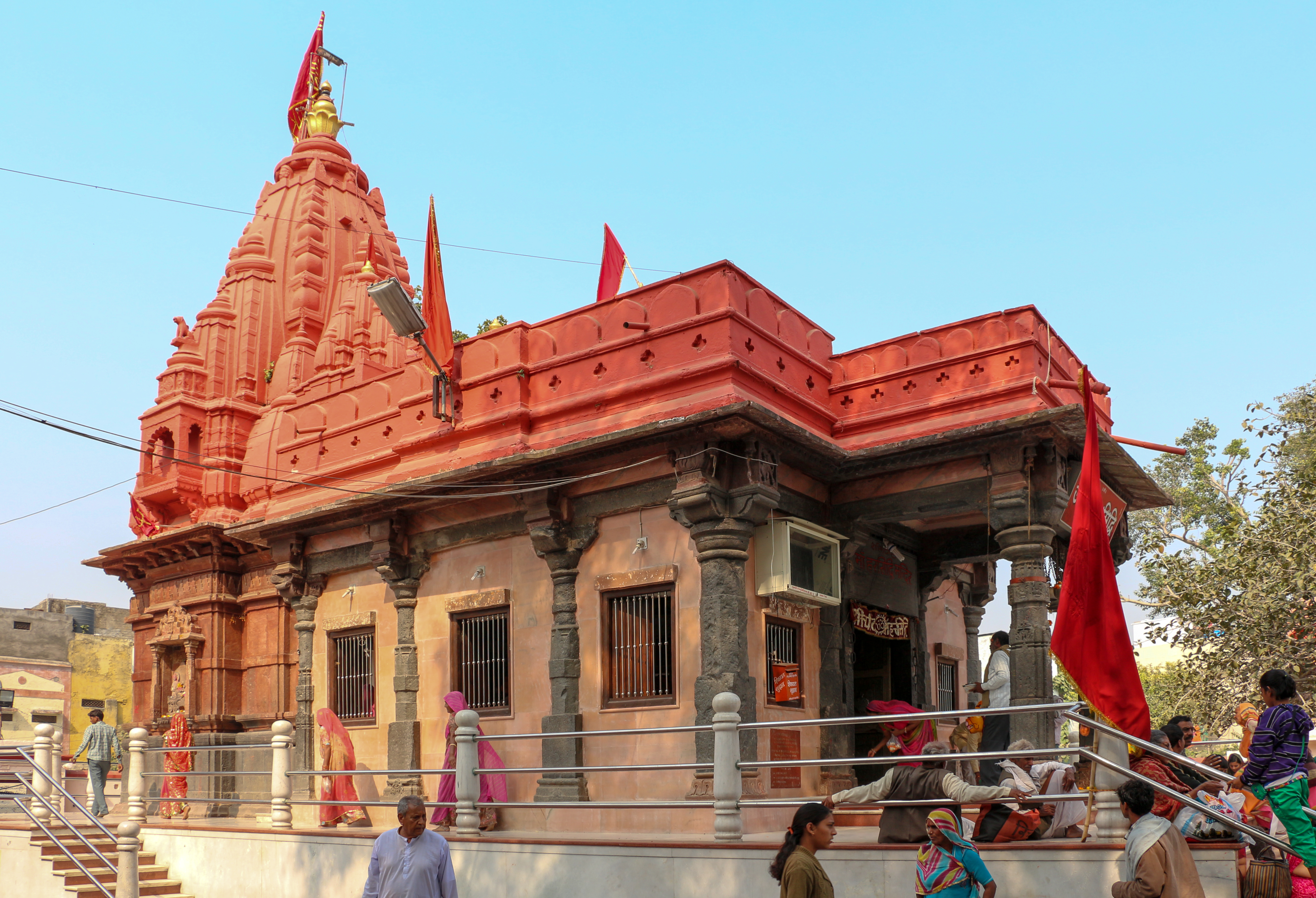
Harsiddhi Temple

This famous temple is said to have been built by famous King Vikramāditya. Vikramaditya is said to have visited Miyani, then known as Minalpur, a port city ruled by Prabhatsen Chavda of Chawda dynasty. Vikramadiya was blessed by the Devi. He requested Harsidhhi Mata, to come to his kingdom at Ujjain, where he would worship her daily. She is also known as Vahanvati Mata.

The temple was reconstructed during the Maratha period and has two pillars adorned with lamps, that are special features of Maratha art. There is an ancient well on the premises, and an artistic pillar adorns the top of it.

=== Kal Bhairava temple ===
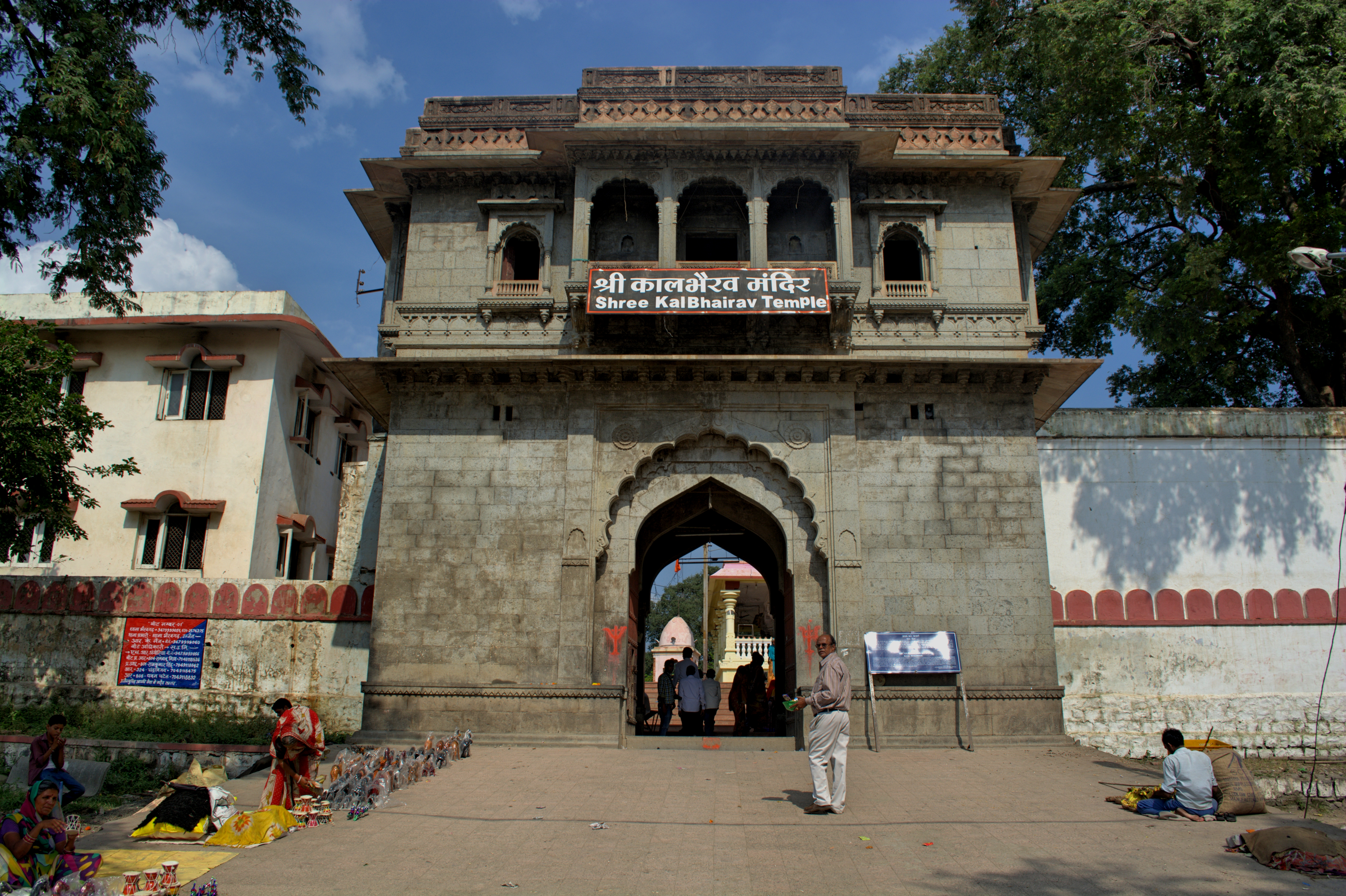
Kal Bhairav Mandir entrance

The worship of the eight Bhairavas is a part of Saivite tradition, and the chief among them is Kala Bhairava. The Kal Bhairava temple is believed to have been built by King Bhadrasen, on the banks of the Shipra. Mentioned in the Avanti Khanda of the Skanda Purana. Important for the Tantric Kapalika and Aghora sects, of which Ujjain was a prominent centre. Beautiful paintings in the Malwa style once decorated the temple walls, only traces of which are visible. The village of Bhairogarh, famous for its printing, takes its name from the temple, and is located very near.

=== Mangalnath temple ===
Shiva or Mahadeva is the deity which is worshipped in Mangalnath temple.

=== Gopal Mandir ===
Constructed by Bayajibai Shinde, the queen of Maharajah Daulat Rao Shinde, in the 19th century. The door in the inner sanctum is believed to have been carried to Ghazni from the Somnath temple and from thence by Mahmud Shah Abdali to Lahore, from where it was rescued by Mahadji Scindia.

=== Other temples ===
- Navagraha Mandir (Triveni) - A temple dedicated to the nine planets.
- Ram Janardhan Temple.
- Harihara Tirtha.
- Mallikarjuna Tirtha.

== Matsyendranath ==
This is very attractive spot on the banks of Shipra River, quite close to the Bhartrihari Caves and the Gadkalika temple. The Gadkalika temple is where poet Kalidas is believed to have obtained the grace of Kali. The shrine is dedicated to a leader of the Natha sect of Shaivism- Matsyendranath. It is also venerated by Muslims. Excavations here have yielded artifacts dating to the 6th and 7th century BC.

== Bhartrihari Caves ==
Bhartrihari, the step brother of Vikramaditya, is believed to have lived and meditated here after renouncing worldly life. His famous works, Shringarshataka, Vairagyashataka, and Nitishataka, were possibly written here

== Other places ==
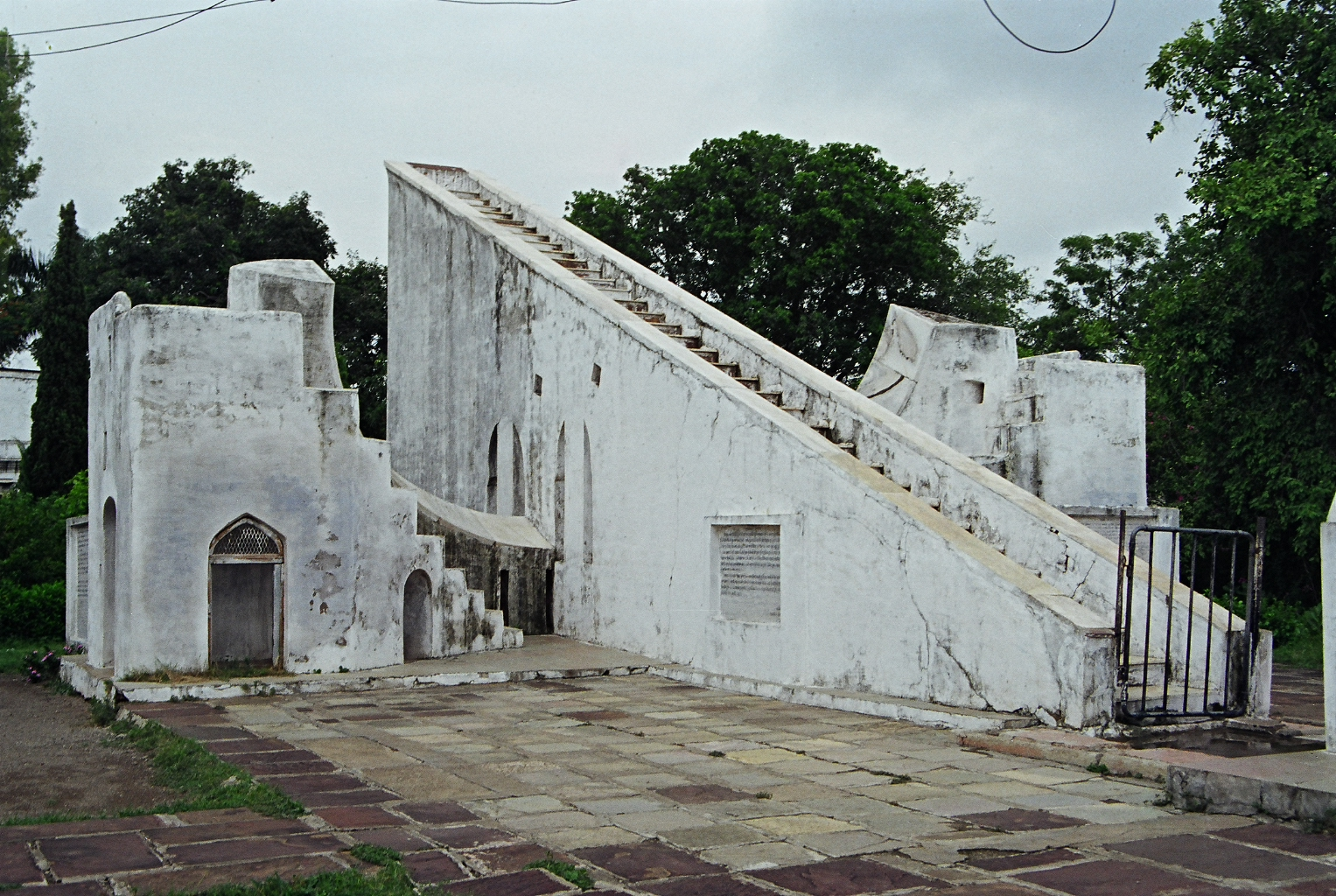
Sun Dial at the Ved Shala

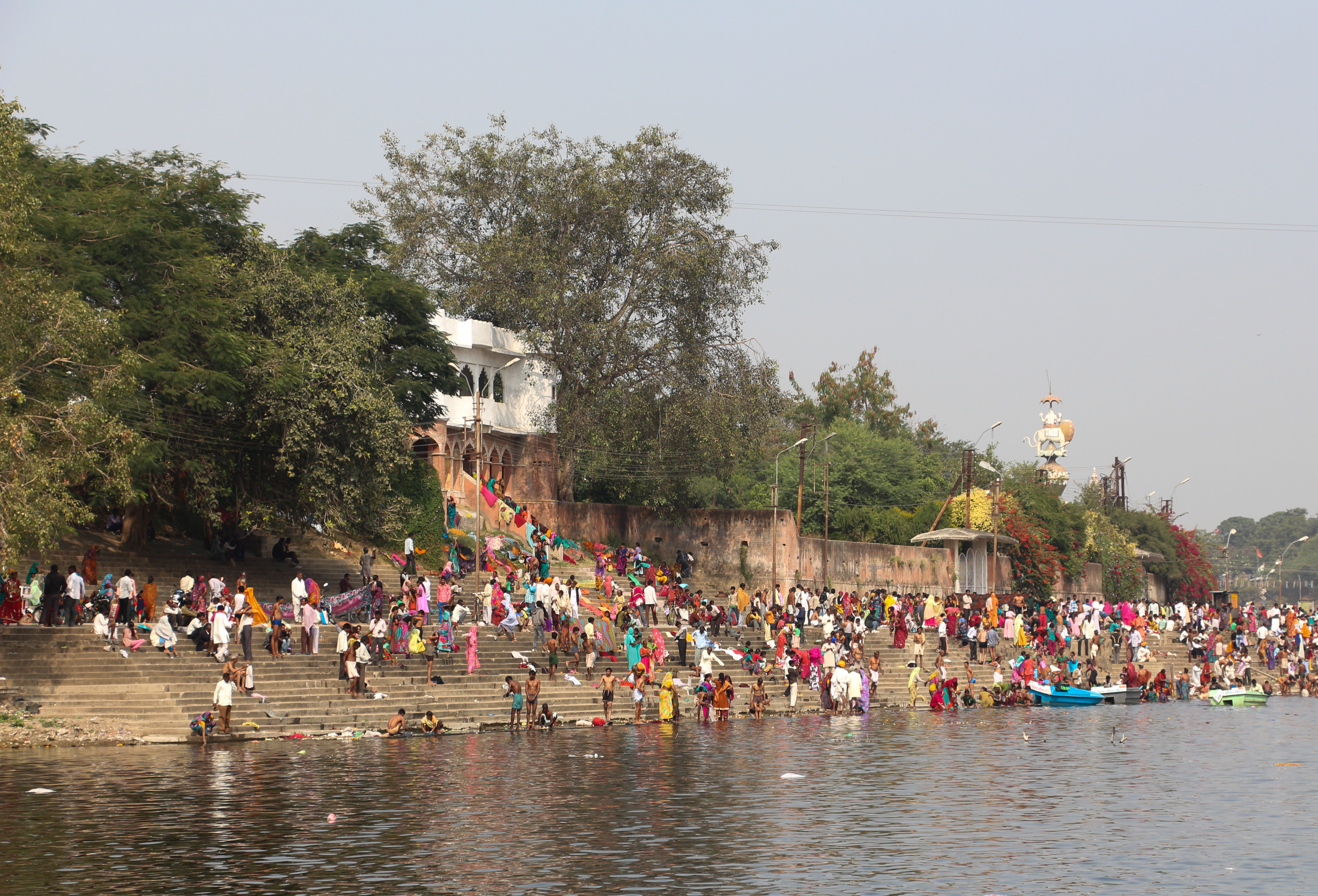
The Ram Ghat

- Vedh Shala - An observatory built by Maharaja Jai Singh II in 1725. It is located at 23°10′16.5″N 75°46′0″E. It is still in use, and is one of the five the built (the others include the Jantar Mantar (Jaipur) and the Jantar Mantar (Delhi).
- Ram Ghat.
- Ganga Ghat.
- Simhasan Battisi Mandir.
- Bada Ganpati & Pancha Mukhi Hanuman
