= Fatehabad Chandrawatiganj =

Coordinates: 23°02′N 75°40′E

Fatehabad Chandrawatiganj is a small town in Madhya Pradesh in Central India. It lies on the border of Ujjain district and Indore district.

Fatehabad and Chandrawatiganj are two villages are next to each other, but Fatehabad is under the jurisdiction of the Ujjain district and Chandrawatiganj is under the Indore district.

It has its own railway station. Fatehabad Chandrawatiganj has its railway junction on the Ratlam–Indore line with a link line going to Ujjain Junction.

A cenotaph of Maharaja Ratan Singh of Ratlam was made here. He died fighting against Aurangzeb.
