= Ujjain Simhastha =

Hindu religious mela held every 12 years

Ujjain Simhastha उज्‍जैन सिंहस्‍थ
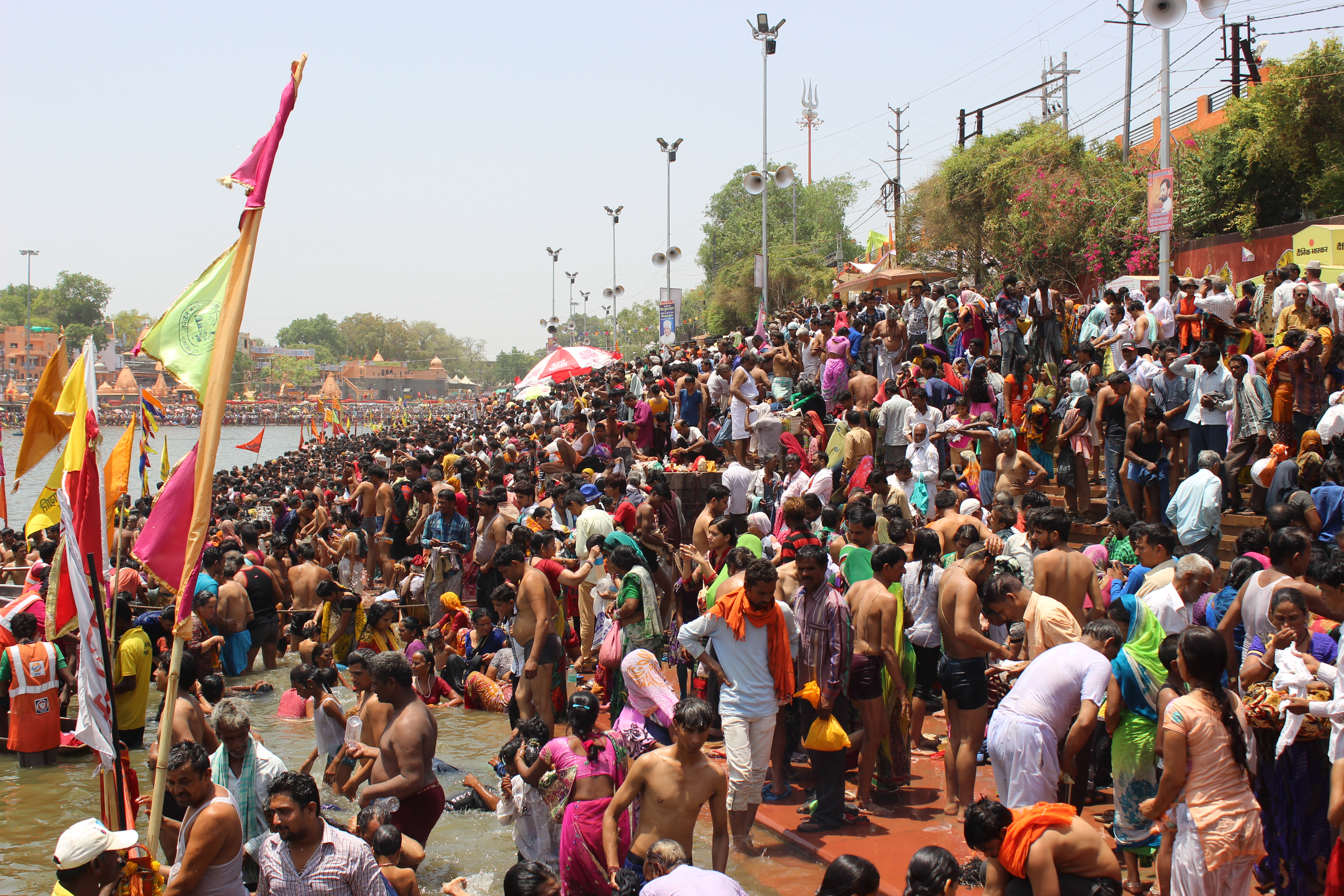
- Ujjain Simhasth 2016 (उज्‍जैन सिंहस्‍थ)
- Status: active
- Genre: Fair
- Frequency: Every 12 years
- Venue: Banks of Shipra river
- Location: Ujjain
- Country: India
- Previous event: 2016
- Next event: 2028
- Participants: Akharas, pilgrims and merchants
- Website: simhasthujjain.in

Ujjain Simhastha is a Hindu religious mela held every 12 years in the Ujjain city of Madhya Pradesh, India. The name is also transliterated as Sinhastha or Singhastha. In Hindi, the fair is also called Simhasth or Sinhasth (due to schwa deletion). The name derives from the fact that it is held when the Jupiter is in Leo (Simha in Hindu astrology).

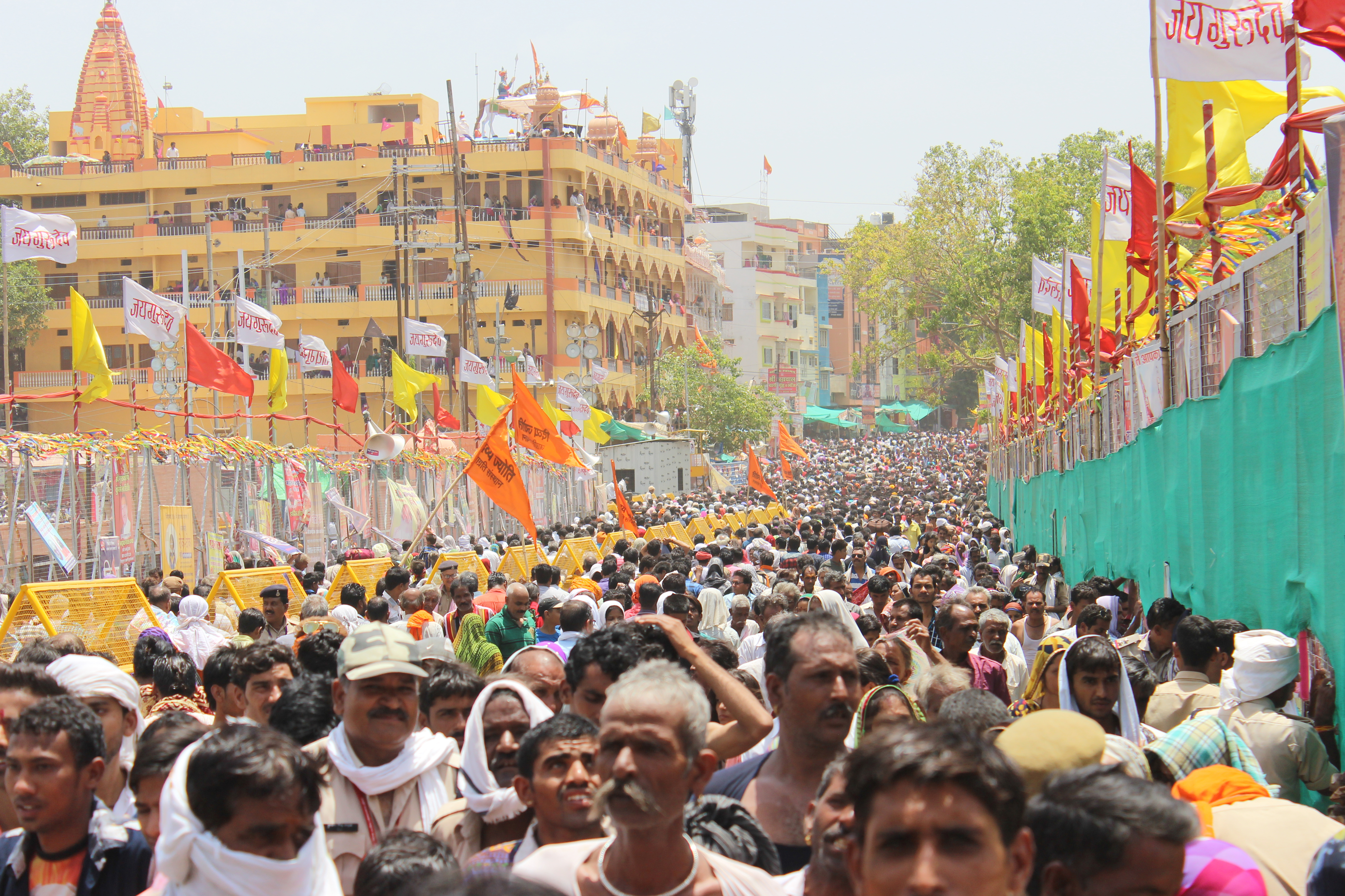
Simhasth 2016 Ujjain pilgrims

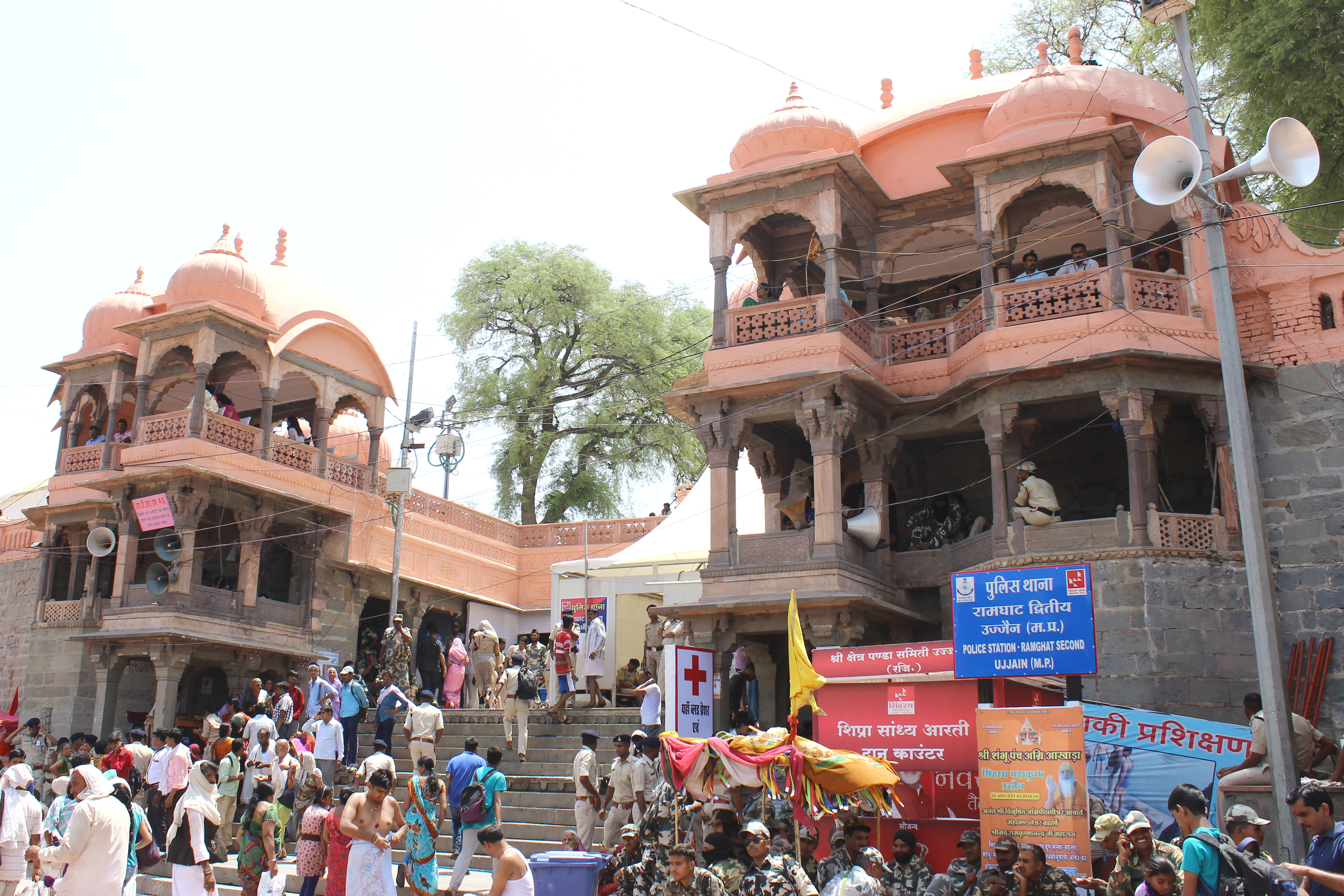
Simhasth2016 Ujjain Ram Ghat

It is one of the four fairs traditionally recognized as Kumbha Melas, and is also known as Ujjain Kumbh Mela. According to Hindu mythology, Garuda dropped drops of amrita (the drink of immortality) at four places, while transporting it in a kumbha (pot). These four places, including Ujjain, are identified as the present-day sites of the Kumbh Mela."Kumbh" in its literal English translation means "Pot", which emerged from "Samudra Manthan"(Churning of the Ocean) between Gods and Demons. The term ‘Mela‘ signifies’Fair‘.

The Simhastha at Ujjain is an adaptation of the Nashik-Trimbak Simhastha fair to a local festival of uncertain origin. In its current form, it began in the 18th century when the Maratha ruler Ranoji Shinde invited ascetics from Nashik to Ujjain's local festival. Both Ujjain and Nashik fairs adopted the Kumbha myth from the Haridwar Kumbh Mela. The Simhastha at Ujjayini pays special reverence to the temple of Mahakaleshwar Jyotirlinga, which is the abode of Lord Shiva's Swayambhu lingam. A river-side festival, it is celebrated on the banks of Shipra river. The fair attracts millions of pilgrims.

== Date ==
The Ujjain Simhastha is held once in 12 years, when the Jupiter is in Leo (Simha in Hindu astrology). The main snana (bathing ritual) happens on the full moon day in Vaisakha month of the Hindu calendar (April–May).

== History ==
The Ujjain Simhastha started in the 18th century as an adaptation of the Nashik-Trimbakeshwar Simhastha. The Khulasat-ut-Tawarikh (1695 CE) is the earliest extant text that mentions the term "Kumbh Mela". The book mentions Ujjain as a very sacred place in its description of the Malwa Subah. However, it does not mention any fair at Ujjain, although it mentions the melas at Haridwar (an annual mela and a Kumbh Mela every 12 years), Prayag (an annual mela in Magh) and Trimbak (a mela held every 12 years when Jupiter enters Leo). Like the fairs at Prayag (Allahabad) and Nashik, the Ujjain mela was not called a "Kumbh Mela" until the 19th century: that term was originally used only for the Haridwar fair.

=== Maratha era ===
According to the Vikrama-Smrti-Grantha published by the Vikram University, the Ujjain Simhastha began when the Maratha ruler Ranoji Shinde (died 1745) invited akharas from Nashik to Ujjain for a local festival of uncertain origin. This explains why the Ujjain and the Nashik fairs occur within one year of each other, when Jupiter enters Leo. The Ujjain fair happens first if the Jupiter enters Leo before spring; the Nashik fair happens first if the Jupiter enters Leo between spring and late summer.

In 1789, after a clash between Shaivite sanyasis and Vaishnavite bairagis at Trimbak, the Maratha Peshwa ordered the two groups to bathe at separate places. The Peshwa also imposed this rule on the next Ujjain Simhastha: the sanyasis would bathe on the one side of the Shipra river, the bairagis on the other.

=== British era ===
During the British rule, the Ujjain Simhastha was the only Kumbh Mela organized in a princely state. While Haridwar, Prayag and Trimbak-Nashik were part of the territories directly ruled by the British, Ujjain was part of the Gwalior State ruled by the Scindia (Shinde) dynasty. During this time, the Scindias financed half of the event's expenses.

At the 1826 fair in Ujjain, a sectarian conflict took place between the Saivite Gosains and the Vaishnavite Bairagis. The Gosains, who started the clash, were defeated. Their monasteries and temples were plundered by the Bairagis, who were assisted by the local Marathas.

The militarized sadhus were disarmed during the British era. An 1850 British account mentions that the administrators of Ujjain sought British military help to prevent violence between Gosains and Bairagis. In response, two companies of the Gwalior Infantry were deployed in Ujjain under the command of Captain Macpherson. A fenced barrier was constructed in the middle of the shallow river so that the two groups could bathe independently of each other instead of fighting over ceremonial precedence. One hundred Brahmins were positioned along to fence to assist the sadhus in their ablutions. Macpherson deployed his troops throughout the city, on the bathing ghats and in the temple balconies. He convinced the Saivites to conclude their bathing rituals in the morning, before the arrival of much larger and more powerful Vaishanavite group. As a precaution, he also deployed heavy guns along the river to curb any potential violence. There was a dispute between two Vaishnavite sub-groups, which was resolved by Macpherson without violence.

The 1921 Simhastha is notable for a historic debate in which the Ramanandi Sampradaya defeated the Ramanuja sampradaya (Shri Vaishnavas). The debate was to address the question whether the Shri Vaishnava literature offended Ramachandra. The Ramanuja sampradaya was defended by Swami Ramprapann Ramanujadas of the Totadri math. The Ramanandis were represented by Bhagavadacharya (alias Bhagvad Das). The jury declared Bhagavadacharya as the winner of the debate, and Ramanandis became independent of the Ramanuja sampradaya. However, some Ramanandis continued to regard themselves as part of the Ramanuja sampradaya, alleging that Bhagavadacharya forged evidence used to win the debate and that the jury was biased. The Ramanujis were prohibited from participating in the subsequent 1932 Kumbh Mela at Ujjain.

=== Independent India ===
The 1992 Simhastha, which preceded the demolition of the Babri Masjid, is noted for Ram Janmabhoomi campaign. Bharatiya Janata Party (BJP) leader Vijaya Raje Scindia was President of the fair's organizing committee. Around 10 million pilgrims visited Ujjain during 17 April - 16 May. During this time, annual sessions of Bajrang Dal and Durga Vahini's Madhya Bharat branch were held in Ujjain. Satyamitranand Giri "re-converted" some 100 tribals to Hinduism at the Durga Vahini session. A Sanskrit Sammelan presided over by Karan Singh attracted several Hindu nationalists. Avaidyanath presided over a Sant Sammelan ("gathering of sants"), in which he declared that his movement was committed to the construction of a temple in Ayodhya. Vishwa Hindu Parishad (VHP) leader Ashok Singhal requested all sadhus to spend the chaturmas (July–October) in Ayodhya in order to exert pressure on the Government. Some individuals, such as Swami Yogeshwar Videhi Hariji, objected to the politicization of the Mela, but were isolated.

The 2016 Ujjain Simhastha was organized between 22 April and 21 May. According to the state's Transport Minister Bhoopendra Singh, nearly 75 million people visited the fair during this one-month period.

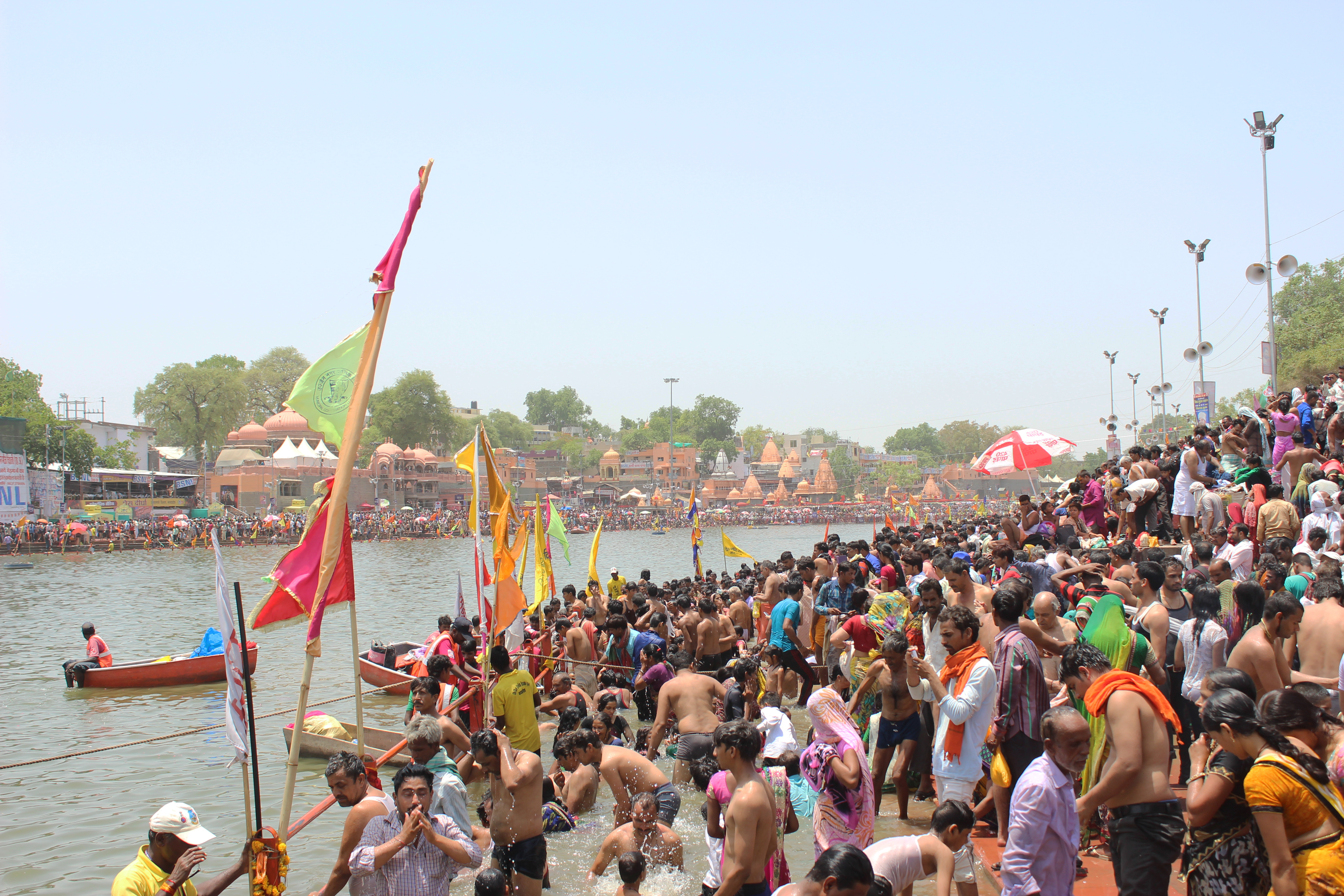
Simhasth 2016 Ujjain Snan

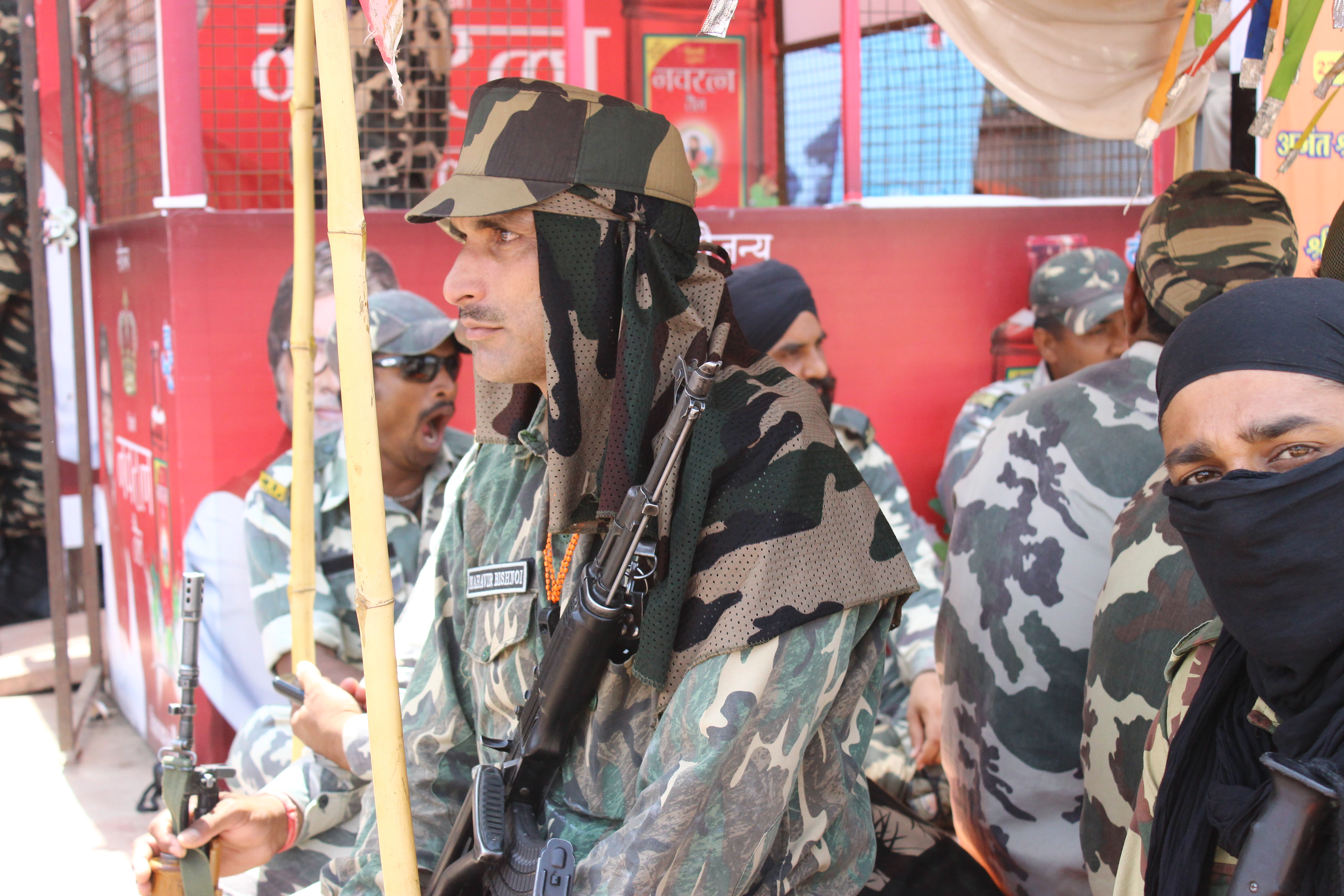
Simhasth 2016 Ujjain Security

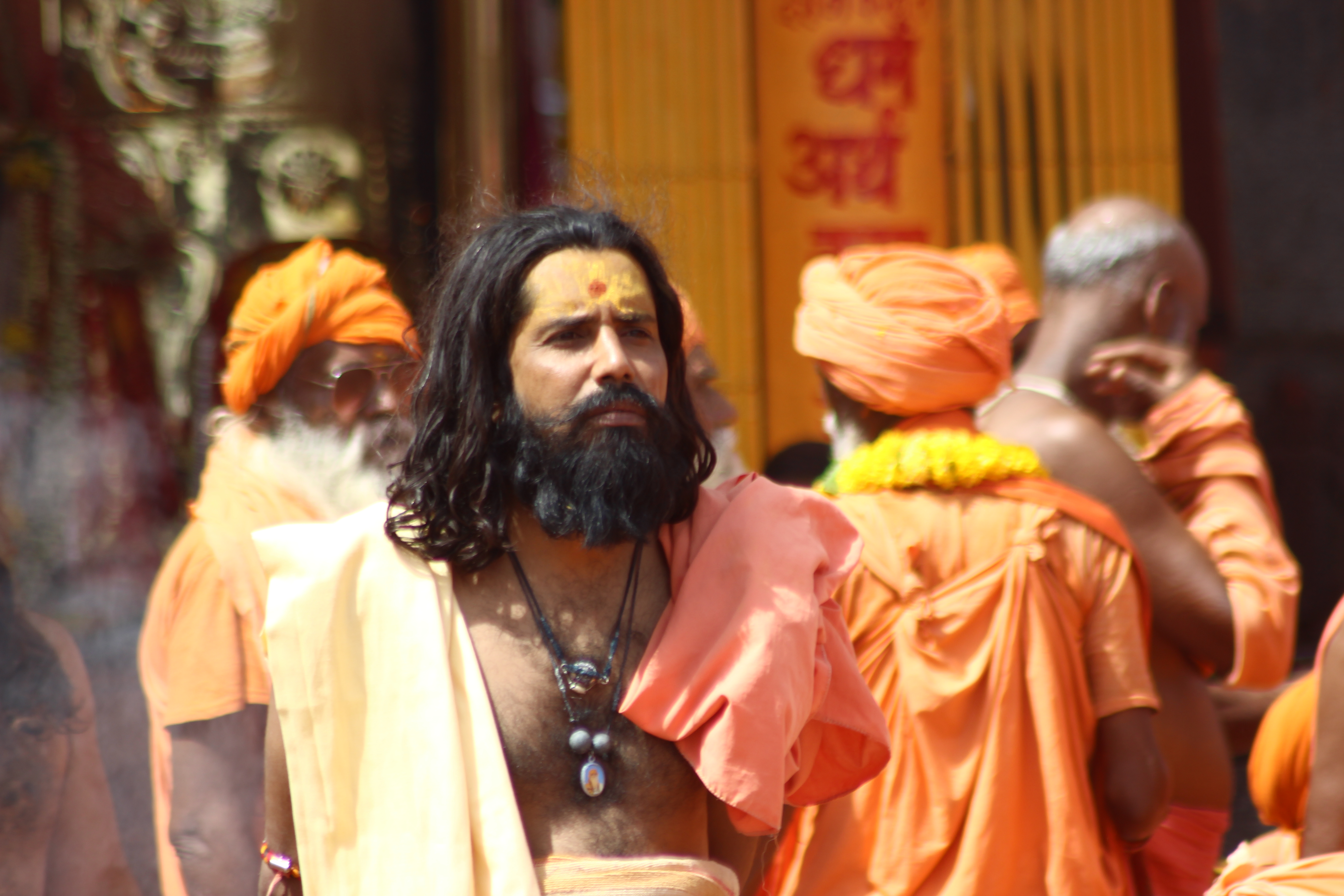
Simhasth 2016 Ujjain Saadhu

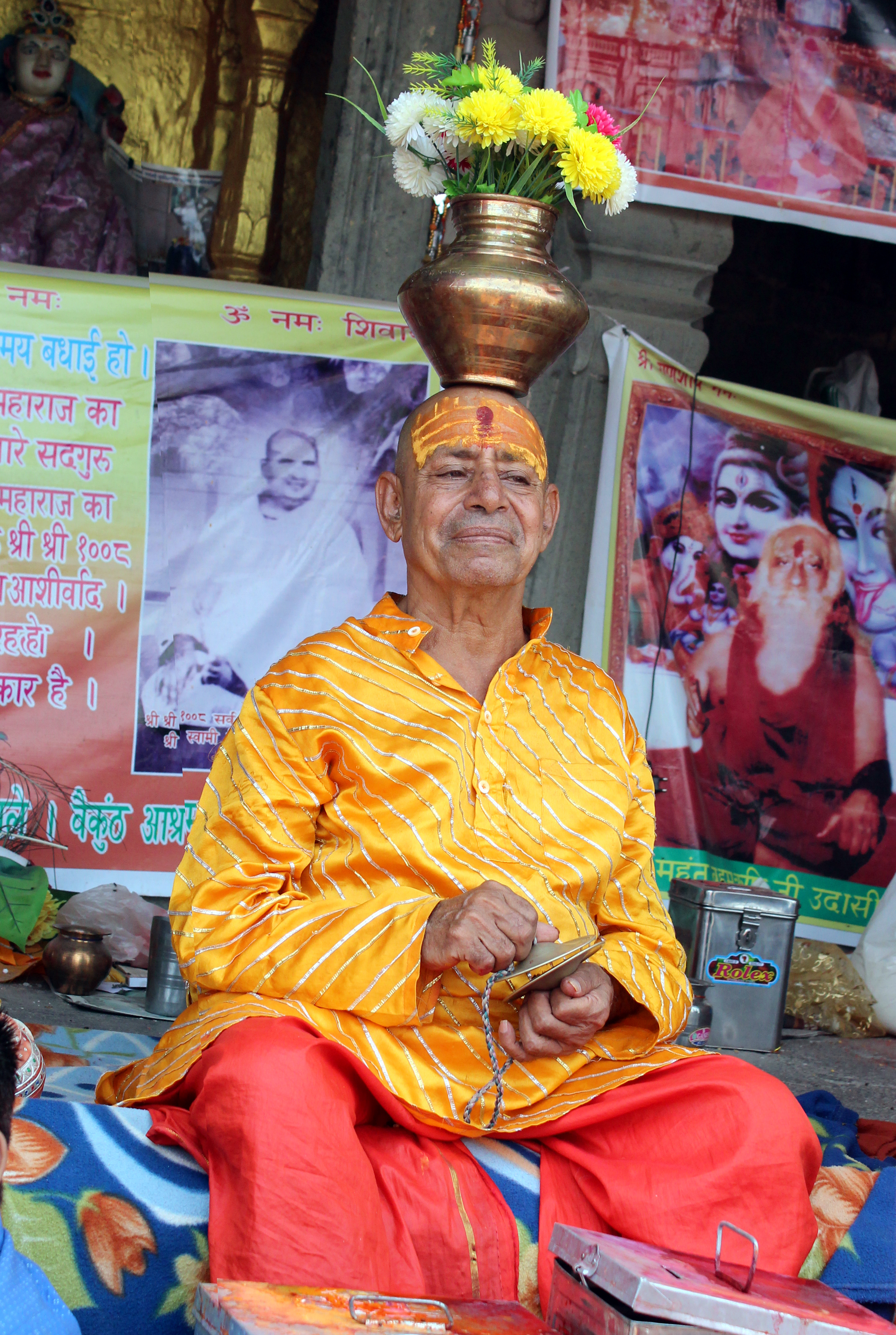
Simhasth 2016 Ujjain Saadhu

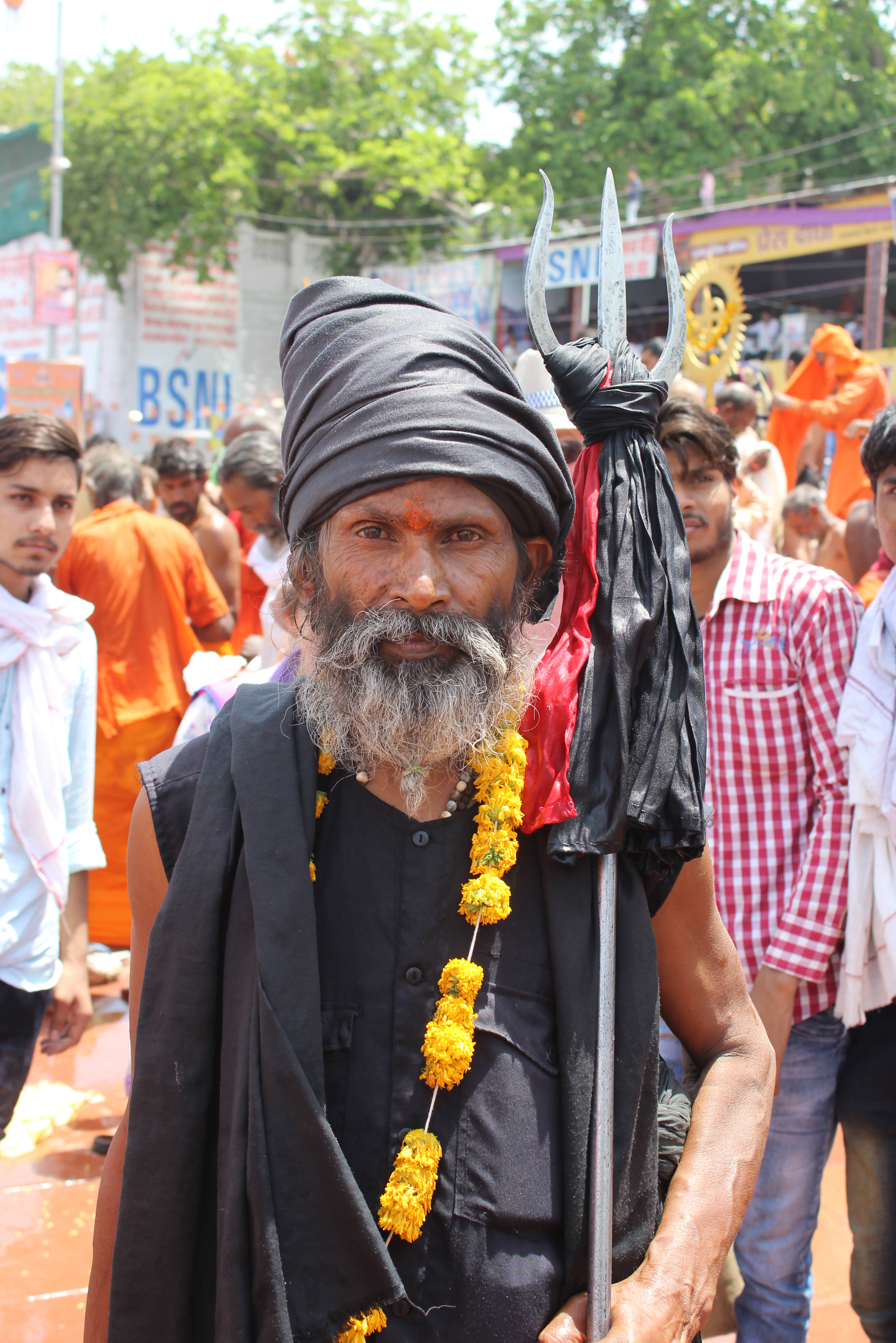
Simhasth 2016 Ujjain Saadhu

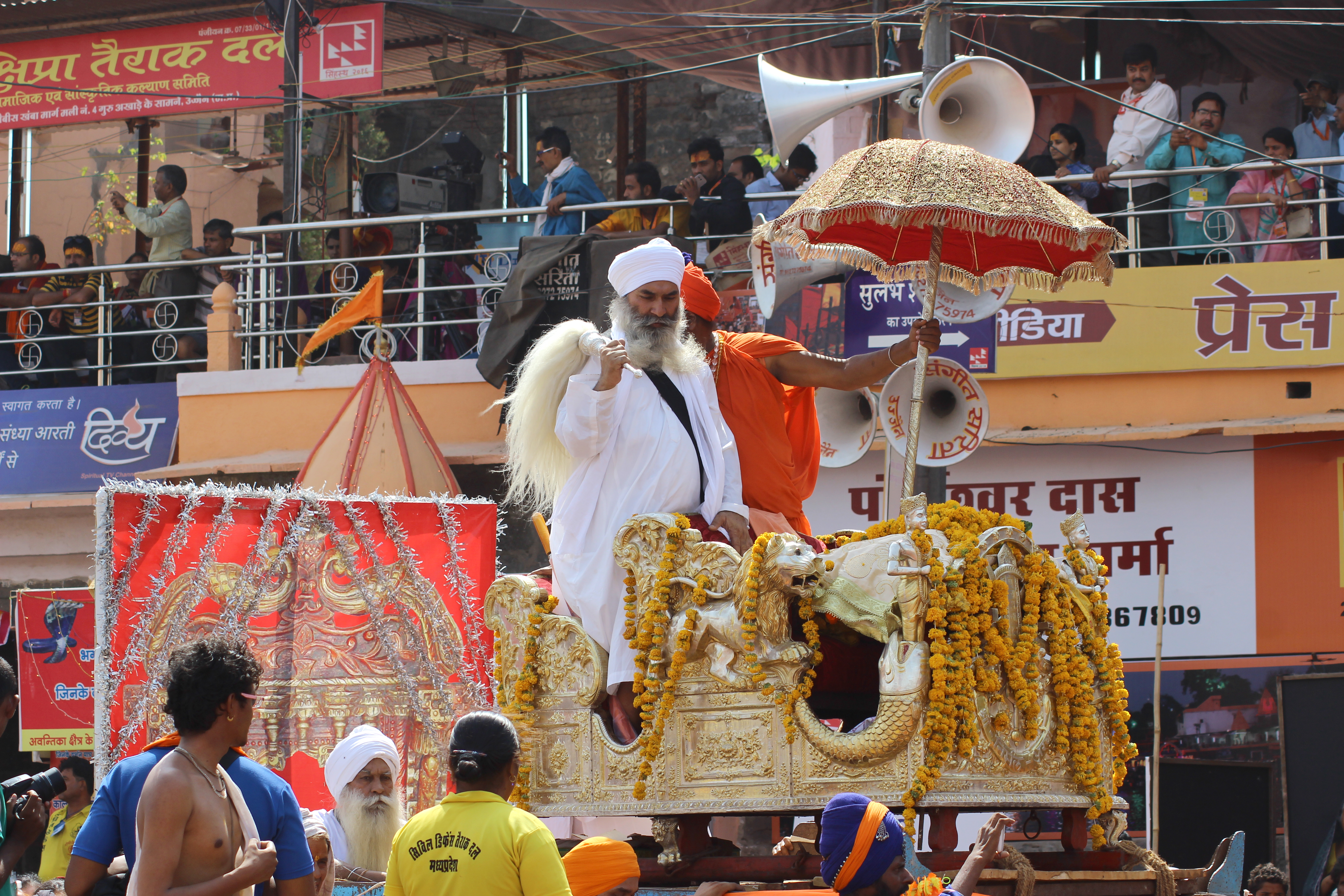
Simhasth 2016 Panchayati akhada nirmal Shahi Snan sawari

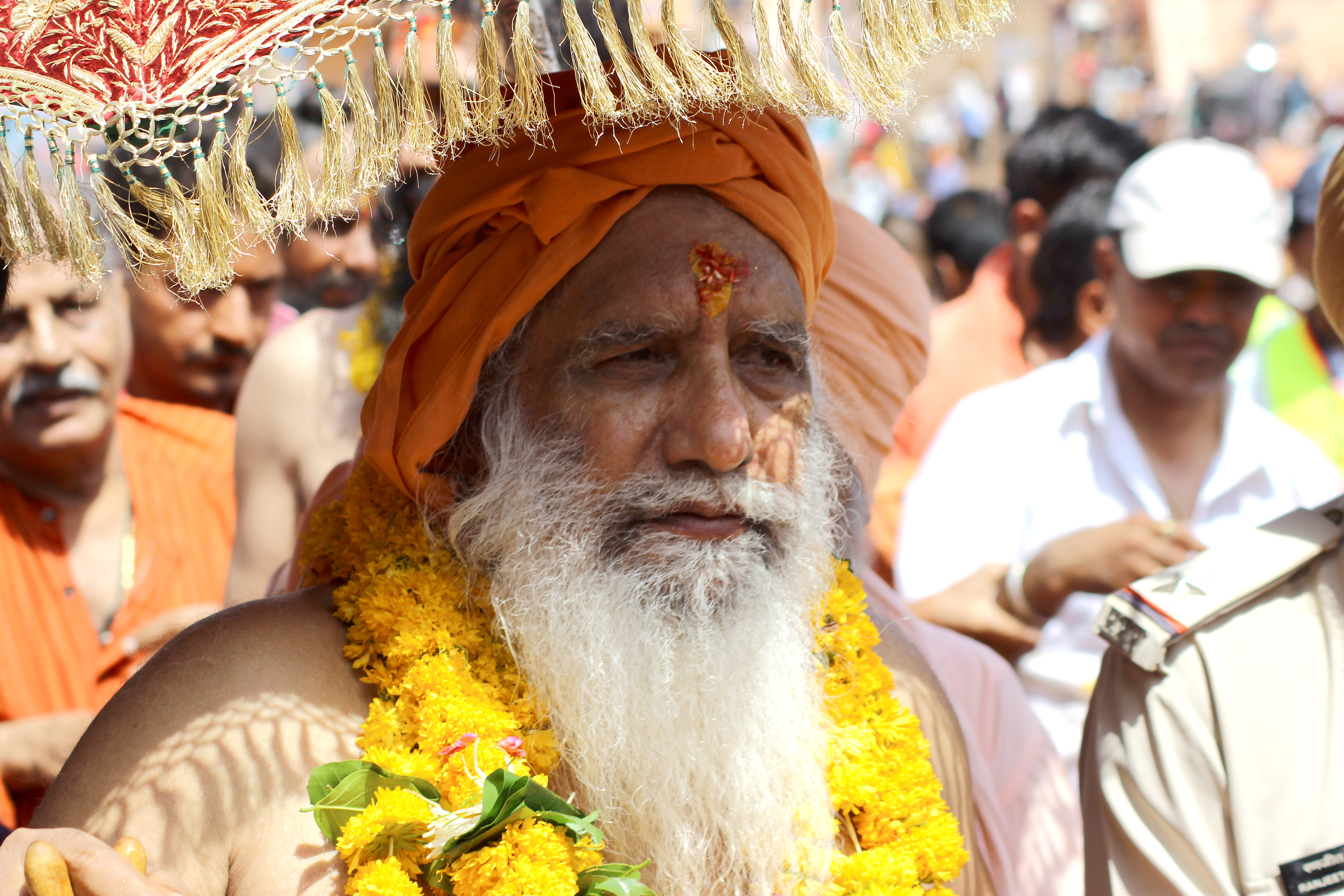
Simhasth 2016 Panchayati akhada nirmal Shahi Snan Leading

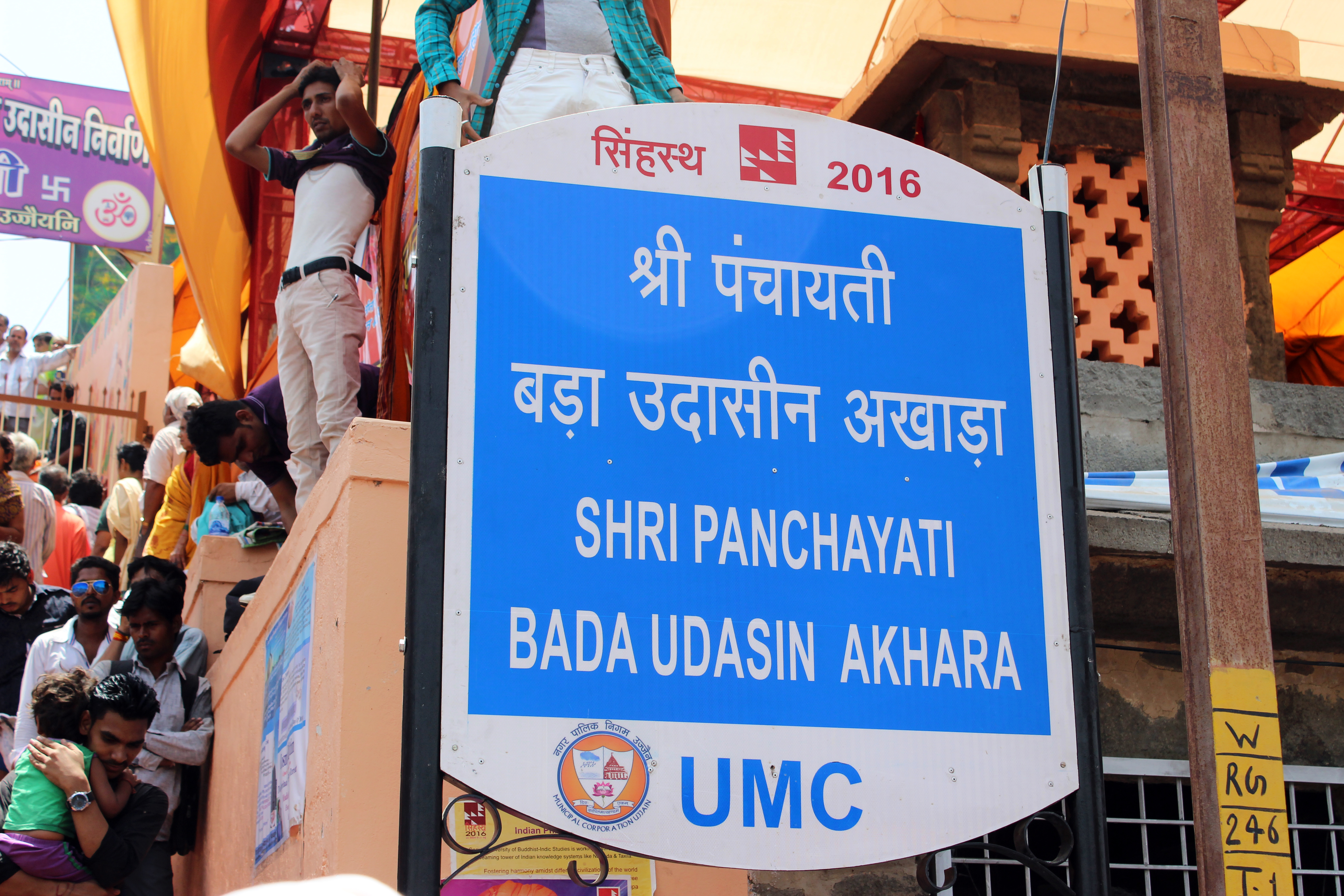
Simhasth 2016 Shree Panchayati Bada Udaseen Akhada

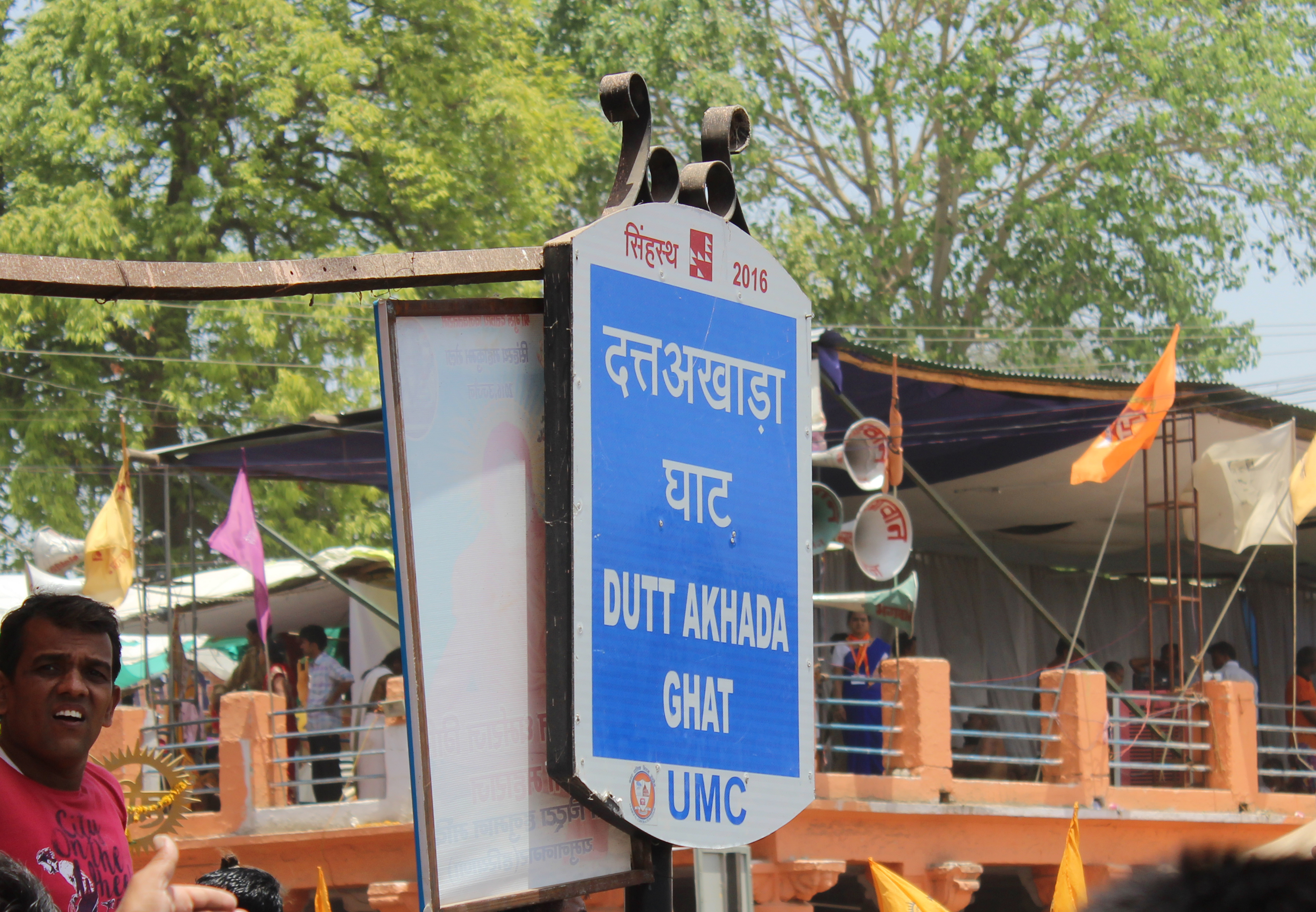
Simhasth 2016 Ujjain Dutt Akhada Ghaat

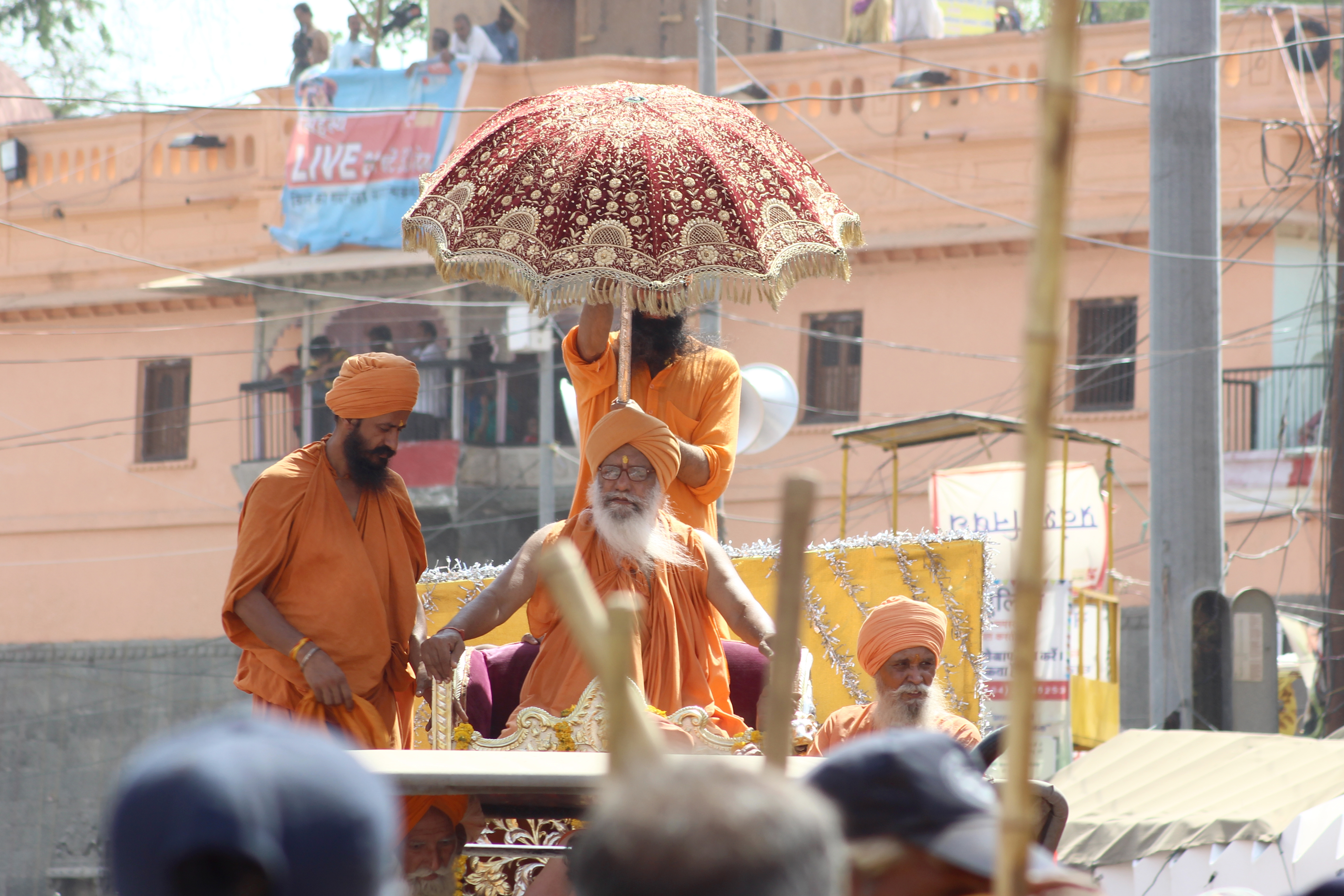
Simhasth 2016 Panchayati akhada nirmal Shahi Snan
