= Shipra River =

River in Madhya Pradesh, India

Coordinates: 22.900°N 75.983°E

क्षिप्रा Shipra
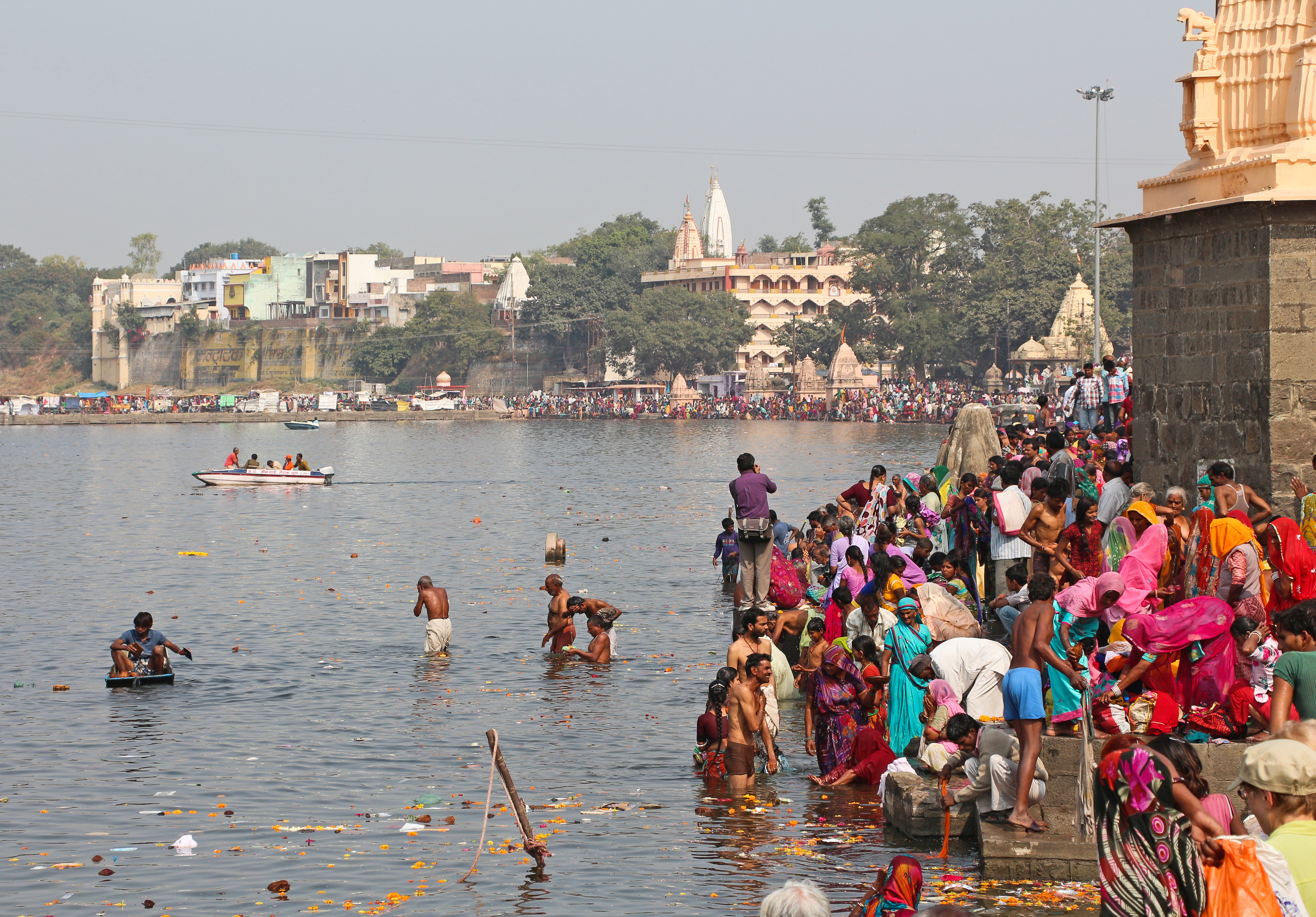
- The Shri Ram Ghat on the Shipra River in Ujjain

Location
- Country: India
- State: Madhya Pradesh

Physical characteristics
- Source: Kakri Bardi Hills
  - location: Indore, India
- Mouth: Chambal river
  - location: Ekalgarh Madhya Pradesh, India
- Length: 195 km (121 mi)

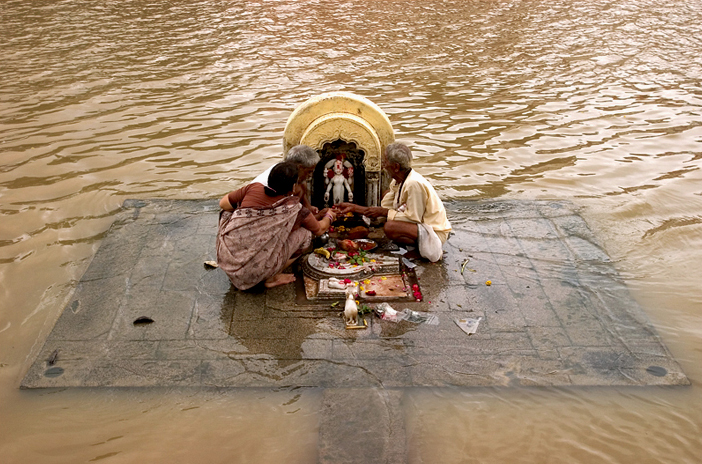
A puja performed on the banks of the overflowing Shipra River in Ujjain during the summer monsoon.

Shipra (from Sanskrit Kshipra) is a river in Madhya Pradesh state of Central India. The river rises in the eastern part of Indore district and flows north across the Malwa Plateau to join the Chambal River at the MP-Rajasthan boundary in Mandsaur district.

It is one of the sacred rivers in Hinduism. The holy city of Ujjain is situated on its east bank. Every 12 years, the Ujjain Simhastha takes place on the city's elaborate riverside ghats, as do yearly celebrations of Kshipra, the river goddess in Hinduism. There are hundreds of Hindu shrines along the banks of the river Shipra. With this reference, the word Shipra is used as a symbol of "purity" (of soul, emotions, body, etc.) or "chastity" or "clarity". The Puranas, or ancient Hindu texts, also suggest that the Shipra originated from the heart of Varaha, Lord Vishnu's incarnation as a boar. Also on the banks of the Shipra is Sage Sandipani’s ashram or hermitage where according to Hindu beliefs the main Hinduism deity Lord Krishna, Lord Vishnu's eighth incarnation, had studied.

== Hydrology ==
Shipra is a perennial river. Earlier there used to be plenty of water in the river. Now the river stops flowing a couple of months after the monsoon.

Narmada Shipra Sihastha Link Pariyojana, Mundla Dosdar - a project linking Shipra River to River Narmada was commenced in 2012 and completed in 2015. The project lifts water from the Narmada river using electricity, and then transports it to the source of Kshipra river through pipes. The link project is the first phase of the Rs 8000-crore Narmada-Malwa Link project. Under the project, Narmada would be connected to the Kshipra, Gambhir, Kalisindh, and Parwati rivers.
