= List of planning agencies in India =

This article lists metropolitan or district level planning agencies in India grouped by their home state or union territory. Planning agencies are different from Municipal Authorities in their mandate and functions. They are responsible for infrastructure development, slum rehabilitation, preparation and implementation of master plans, eco-friendly schemes, transportation etc. Note that a metropolitan area may have more than one such agency.

== Andhra Pradesh ==
Urban Development Authorities (UDAs) include

Visakhapatnam

- Visakhapatnam Metropolitan Region Development Authority (VMRDA)

Vijayawada - Guntur

- Amaravati Metropolitan Region Development Authority (APCRDA)

Tirupati

- Tirupati Urban Development Authority (TUDA)

Kurnool

- Kurnool Urban Development Authority (KUDA)

Machilipatnam

- Machilipatnam Urban Development Authority (MUDA)

Anantapur–Hindupur

- Anantapuramu–Hindupur Urban Development Authority (AHUDA)

Bobbili

- Bobbili Urban Development Authority (BUDA)

Chittoor

- Chittoor Urban Development Authority (CHUDA)

Eluru

- Eluru Urban Development Authority (EUDA)

Rajahmundry–Kakinada

Godavari Urban Development Authority (GUDA)

Kadapa

- Annamayya Urban Development Authority (AUDA)

Nellore

- Nellore Urban Development Authority (NUDA)

Ongole

- Ongole Urban Development Authority (OUDA)

Palamaner–Kuppam–Madanapalle

- Palamaner Kuppam Madanapalle Urban Development Authority (PKMUDA)

Puttaparthi

- Puttaparthi Urban Development Authority (PUDA)

Srikakulam

- Srikakulam Urban Development Authority (SUDA)

== Assam ==
Guwahati

- Guwahati Metropolitan Development Authority (GMDA)

Dibrugarh

- Dibrugarh Development Authority

== Bihar ==
Patna

- Patna Regional Development Authority (PRDA)
- Infrastructure Development Authority Bihar

== Chhattisgarh ==
Raipur

- Nava Raipur Atal Nagar Vikas Pradhikaran (ANVP)

== Delhi ==
- Delhi Development Authority (DDA)

== Gujarat ==
List of Gujarat government planning authorities:

=== Industries and Mines Department ===
No.	Name of Authority	Headquarters City	Official Website
1	Dholera Special Investment Regional Development Authority	Dholera	
2	Gujarat Chemical and Petrochemicals Special Investment Regional Development Authority	Ahmedabad	
3	Diamond Research and Mercantile City Limited	Surat	
4	International Financial Services Centres Authority (IFSCA)	GIFT City	
5	Mandal Becharaji Investment Regional Development Authority	Becharaji	

=== Urban Development ===
No.	Urban Development Authority	Headquarters City	Official Website
1	Gandhinagar Urban Development Authority	Gandhinagar	
2	Ahmedabad Urban Development Authority	Ahmedabad	
3	Vadodara Urban Development Authority	Vadodara	
4	Surat Urban Development Authority	Surat	
5	Rajkot Urban Development Authority	Rajkot	
6	Junagadh Urban Development Authority	Junagadh	
7	Somnath Urban Development Authority	Somnath	
8	Bharuch-Ankaleshwar Urban Development Authority	Bharuch	
9	Gujarat International Finance Tech City Urban Dev. Auth.	Gandhinagar	
10	Morbi-Vankaner Urban Development Authority	Morbi	
11	Surendranagar-Dudharage-Vadhavan Urban Dev. Authority	Surendranagar	
12	Anand-Vallabh vidhyanagar-Karamsad Urban Dev. Authority	Anand	
13	Himmatnagar Urban Development Authority	Himmatnagar	
14	Navsari Urban Development Authority	Navsari	
15	Bardoli Urban Development Authority	Bardoli	
16	Khajod Urban Development Authority	Khajod	[115]

=== Area Development ===
No.	Area Development Authority	Headquarters City	Official Website
1	Bhavnagar Area Development Authority	Bhavnagar	
2	Jamnagar Area Development Authority	Jamnagar	
3	Bhuj Area Development Authority	Bhuj	
4	Anjar Area Development Authority	Anjar	
5	Bhachau Area Development Authority	Bhachau	
6	Rapar Area Development Authority	Rapar	N/A
7	Ambaji Area Development Authority	Ambaji	N/A
8	Alang Area Development Authority	Alang	N/A
9	Vadinar Area Development Authority	Vadinar	N/A
10	Khambhadiya Area Development Authority	Khambhadiya	N/A
11	Shamalaji Area Development Authority	Shamalaji	N/A
12	Khajod Area Development Authority	Khajod	N/A
13	Gandhidham Area Development Authority	Gandhidham	N/A
14	Bechraji Area Development Authority	Bahucharaji	N/A

== Haryana ==
Gurgaon

- Gurugram Metropolitan Development Authority (GMDA)

== Karnataka ==
Bangalore

- Bangalore Development Authority
- Bangalore Metropolitan Region Development Authority (BMRDA)

Hubli-Dharwad

- Hubballi-Dharwad Urban Development Authority (HDUDA)

Mysore

- Mysore Urban Development Authority (MUDA)

Mangalore

- Mangalore Urban Development Authority (MUDA)

== Kerala ==
Thiruvananthapuram

- Thiruvananthapuram Development Authority (RIDA)

Kochi

- Greater Cochin Development Authority (GCDA)
- Goshree Islands Development Authority (GIDA)

== Madhya Pradesh ==
Indore

- Indore Development Authority (IDA)

Bhopal

- Bhopal Development Authority

Jabalpur

- Jabalpur Development Authority

Gwalior

- Gwalior Development Authority (GDA)

Ujjain

- Ujjain Development Authority (UDA)

== Maharashtra ==
Mumbai & Navi Mumbai

- Mumbai Metropolitan Region Development Authority (MMRDA)
- City and Industrial Development Corporation (CIDCO)

Nagpur

- NMRDA - Nagpur Metropolitan Region Development Authority
- Nagpur Improvement Trust
- MIHAN - Multi-modal International Cargo Hub and Airport at Nagpur

Pune

- Pune Metropolitan Region Development Authority (PMRDA)

Nashik

- Nashik Metropolitan Region Development Authority (NMRDA)

== Odisha ==
Bhubaneswar

- Bhubaneswar Development Authority (BDA)

Cuttack

- Cuttack Development Authority (CDA)

== Rajasthan ==
- Jaipur Development Authority (JDA)
- Jodhpur Development Authority (JoDA in official Terms and JDA Unofficially)
- Kota Development Authority (KDA)

== Tamil Nadu ==
Chennai

- Chennai Metropolitan Development Authority (CMDA)
  Overseas the districts of Chennai, Kanchipuram, Thiruvallur and chengalpattu

Coimbatore

- Coimbatore Urban Development Authority

Salem

- Salem Urban Development Authority

Madurai

- Madurai Urban Development Authority

Tiruppur

- Tiruppur Urban Development Authority

Hosur

- Hosur Urban Development Authority

Tiruchirappalli

- Trichy Urban Development Authority

== Telangana ==
Urban Development Authorities in Telangana include

Hyderabad

- Hyderabad Metropolitan Development Authority (HMDA)

Warangal

- Kakatiya Urban Development Authority (KUDA)

Mahabubnagar

- Mahabubnagar Urban Development Authority (MUDA)

Karimnagar

- Satavahana Urban Development Authority (SUDA)

Nizamabad

- Nizamabad Urban Development Authority (NUDA)

Nalgonda

- Neelagiri Urban Development Authority (NUDA)

Khammam

- Stambadri Urban Development Authority (SUDA)

Siddipet

- Siddipet Urban Development Authority (SUDA)

Kodangal

- Kodangal Area Development Authority (KADA)

== Uttar Pradesh ==
- Kanpur Development Authority (KDA)
- Lucknow Development Authority (LDA)
- Prayagraj Development Authority (PDA)
- Varanasi Development Authority (VDA)
- Gorakhpur Development Authority (GDA)
- Jhansi Development Authority (JDA)
- Agra Development Authority (ADA)
- Meerut Development Authority (MDA)
- NOIDA (NOIDA)

== Uttarakhand ==
Dehradun / Mussoorie

- Mussoorie Dehradun Development Authority (MDDA)

Haridwar / Roorkee

- Haridwar Roorkee Development Authority (HRDA)

== West Bengal ==
Kolkata

- Kolkata Metropolitan Development Authority (KMDA)

Siliguri / Jalpaiguri

- Siliguri Jalpaiguri Development Authority (SJDA)

== See also ==
- NITI Aayog
- District Planning Committee
- List of think tanks in India
- List of office-holders in the Government of India
