= Urban Development Authority (India) =

Type of government agency in India

Urban Development Authorities are statutory civic bodies created for the development of planned infrastructure and housing projects in cities of India. The foundation for current Indian Urban Development Authorities is based on the structure designed during the British colonial era as a result of the Bombay plague in 1896. An Urban Development Authority for each town is created per the 74th amendment to the Constitution of India. The authority consists of planners and bureaucrats who are specialised in civic planning. The officials of the authority work with state governments in town planning activities.

== History and objective ==
Each Urban Development Authority consists of a group of individuals and agencies who are responsible for planning infrastructure development in Indian cities. The individuals are specialised in various aspects of town planning activities.

== Activities ==
Urban Development Authority planners are responsible for the following.

- Ensuring that town planning schemes are implemented.
- Creating and implementing development plans for notified areas.
- Creation and implementation of urban area development initiatives like affordable housing and slum-dwellers development.
- Implementation of Local Area Plans for the improvement of existing areas.
- Modernising building laws.
- Promoting transit-oriented development.
- Inclusion of conversion of heritage buildings in local area plans.
- Social and economic development planning.

== Challenges ==
The Urban Development Authority planners are faced with following challenges:

- Meeting housing needs of urban settlers.
- Investment in development initiatives.
- Resolving drinking water issues.
- Resolving sanitation issues.

== List of authorities ==
Urban Development Authorities exist for the following cities in India.

=== Andhra Pradesh ===
Rank	City	District	Urban Development Authority
1	Anantapur	Anantapur	Anantapuramu–Hindupur Urban Development Authority
2	Eluru	Eluru	Eluru Urban Development Authority
3	Rajahmundry, Kakinada	East Godavari, Kakinada	Godavari Urban Development Authority
4	Kurnool	Kurnool	Kurnool Urban Development Authority
5	Nellore	SPSR Nellore	Nellore Urban Development Authority
6	Tirupati	Tirupati	Tirupati Urban Development Authority
7	Vijayawada, Guntur	NTR, Krishna, Guntur, Palnadu	Andhra Pradesh Capital Region Development Authority
8	Visakhapatnam	Visakhapatnam, Vizianagaram, Anakapalli	Visakhapatnam Metropolitan Region Development Authority
9	Bobbili	Vizianagaram	Bobbili Urban Development Authority
10	Chittoor	Chittoor	Chittoor Urban Development Authority
11	Ongole	Prakasam	Ongole Urban Development Authority
12	Puttaparthi	Sri Sathya Sai	Puttaparthi Urban Development Authority
13	Srikakulam	Srikakulam	Srikakulam Urban Development Authority
14	Machilipatnam	Krishna	Machilipatnam Urban Development Authority
15	Madanapalle	Annamayya, Chittoor	Palamaner Kuppam Madanapalle Urban Development Authority
16	Kadapa	YSR	Annamayya Urban Development Authority

=== Assam ===
Rank	City	District	Urban Development Authority
1	Guwahati	Guwahati	Guwahati Metropolitan Development Authority
2	Tinsukia	Tinsukia	Tinsukia Development Authority
3	Dibrugarh	Dibrugarh	Dibrugarh Development Authority
4	Sivasagar	Sivasagar	Sivasagar Development Authority
5	Jorhat	Jorhat	Jorhat Development Authority
6	Nazira	Nazira	Nazira Development Authority
7	Tezpur	Tezpur	Tezpur Development Authority
8	Nagaon	Nagaon	Nagaon Development Authority
9	Jagiroad	Jagiroad	Jagiroad Development Authority
10	Nalbari	Nalbari	Nalbari Development Authority
11	Bongaigaon	Bongaigaon	Bongaigaon Development Authority
12	Silchar	Silchar	Silchar Development Authority
13	Golaghat	Golaghat	Golaghat Development Authority
14	Lakhimpur	Lakhimpur	North Lakhimpur Development Authority
15	Sonari	Sonari	Sonari Development Authority
16	Diphu	Diphu	Diphu Development Authority
17	Dergaon	Dergaon	Dergaon Development Authority
18	Chariali	Chariali	B. Chariali Development Authority
19	Karimganj	Karimganj	Karimganj Development Authority
20	Dhubri	Dhubri	Dhubri-Gouripur Development Authority
21	Mangaldoi	Mangaldoi	Mangaldoi Development Authority
22	Goalpara	Goalpara	Goalpara Development Authority
23	Kokrajhar	Kokrajhar	Kokrajhar Development Authority
24	Dhemaji	Dhemaji	Dhemaji Development Authority
25	Barpeta	Barpeta	Barpeta Development Authority

=== Bihar ===
Rank	City	District	Urban Development Authority
1	Patna	Patna	Bihar Urban Infrastructure Development Corporation
2	Patna	Patna	Patna Regional Development Authority

=== Chhattisgarh ===
Rank	City	District	Urban Development Authority
1	Raipur	Raipur	Nava Raipur Atal Nagar Vikas Pradhikaran

=== Goa ===
Rank	City	District	Urban Development Authority
1	Margao	Margao	South Goa Planning & Development Authority
2	Panaji	Panaji	North Goa Planning & Development Authority
3	Vasco Da Gama	Vasco Da Gama	Mormugao Planning & Development Authority

=== Gujarat ===
Rank	City	District	Urban Development Authority
1	Ahmedabad	Ahmedabad	Ahmedabad Urban Development Authority
2	Rajkot	Rajkot	Rajkot Urban Development Authority
3	Surat	Surat	Surat Urban Development Authority
4	Vadodara	Vadodara	Vadodara Urban Development Authority
5	Somnath	Gir Somnath	Somnath Urban Development Authority
6	Jamnagar	Jamnagar	Jamnagar Area Development Authority
7	Bhuj	Kutch	Bhuj Area Development Authority
8	Bhavnagar	Bhavnagar	Bhavnagar Area Development Authority
9	Junagadh	Junagadh	Junagadh Urban Development Authority
10	Gandhinagar	Gandhinagar	Gandhinagar Urban Development Authority

=== Haryana ===
Rank	City	District	Urban Development Authority
1	Haryana	Haryana	Haryana Shahari Vikas Pradhikaran
2	Haryana	Haryana	Haryana State Industrial and Infrastructure Development Corporation

=== Karnataka ===
Rank	City	District	Urban Development Authority
1	Mangalore	Mangalore	Mangalore Urban Development Authority
2	Mysore	Mysore	Mysore Urban Development Authority
3	Bangalore	Bangalore	Bangalore Development Authority
4	Bangalore	Bangalore	Bangalore Metropolitan Region Development Authority
5	Bijapur	Bijapur	Bijapur Urban Development Authority

=== Kerala ===
Rank	City	District	Urban Development Authority
1	Kochi	Kochi	Goshree Islands Development Authority
2	Kochi	Kochi	Greater Cochin Development Authority
3	Kollam	Kollam	Kollam Development Authority
4	Thiruvananthapuram	Thiruvananthapuram	Thiruvananthapuram Development Authority
5	Thrissur	Thrissur	Thrissur Development Authority

=== Madhya Pradesh ===
Rank	City	District	Urban Development Authority
1	Indore	Indore	Indore Development Authority
2	Jabalpur	Jabalpur	Jabalpur Development Authority
3	Ujjain	Ujjain	Ujjain Development Authority

=== Maharashtra ===
Rank	City	District	Urban Development Authority
1	Navi Mumbai	Navi Mumbai	City and Industrial Development Corporation
2	Maharashtra	Maharashtra	Maharashtra Housing and Area Development Authority
3	Mumbai	Mumbai	Mumbai Metropolitan Region Development Authority
4	Nagpur	Nagpur	Nagpur Improvement Trust
5	Nagpur	Nagpur	Nagpur Metropolitan Region Development Authority
6	Nashik	Nashik	Nashik Metropolitan Region Development Authority
7	Pune	Pune	Pune Metropolitan Region Development Authority

=== Odisha ===
Rank	City	District	Urban Development Authority
1	Bhubaneswar	Khordha	Bhubaneswar Development Authority
2	Cuttack	Cuttack	Cuttack Development Authority

=== Punjab ===
Rank	City	District	Urban Development Authority
1	Punjab	Punjab	Punjab Urban Planning and Development Authority

=== Rajasthan ===
Rank	City	District	Urban Development Authority
1	Ajmer	Ajmer	Ajmer Development Authority
2	Bharatpur	Bharatpur	Bharatpur Development Authority
3	Bikaner	Bikaner	Bikaner Development Authority
4	Jaipur	Jaipur	Jaipur Development Authority
5	Jodhpur	Jodhpur	Jodhpur Development Authority
6	Kota	Kota	Kota Development Authority
7	Udaipur	Udaipur	Udaipur Development Authority

=== Tamil Nadu ===
Rank	City	District	Urban Development Authority
1	Chennai	Chennai	Chennai Metropolitan Development Authority
2	Coimbatore	Coimbatore	Coimbatore Urban Development Authority
3	Salem	Salem	Salem Urban Development Authority
4	Madurai	Madurai	Madurai Urban Development Authority
5	Hosur	Krishnagiri	Hosur Urban Development Authority
6	Tiruppur	Tiruppur	Tiruppur Urban Development Authority
7	Tiruchirappalli	Tiruchirappalli	Tiruchirappalli Urban Development Authority

=== Telangana ===
Rank	City	District	Urban Development Authority
1	Hyderabad	Hyderabad	Hyderabad Metropolitan Development Authority
2	Nizamabad, Telangana	Nizamabad, Telangana	Nizamabad Urban Development Authority
3	Karimnagar	Karimnagar	Satavahana Urban Development Authority
4	Khammam	Khammam	Stambadri Urban Development Authority
5	Mahabubnagar	Mahabubnagar district	Mahabubnagar Urban Development Authority
6	Warangal	Warangal	Kakatiya Urban Development Authority
7	Siddipet	Siddipet district	Siddipet Urban Development Authority
8	Nalgonda	Nalgonda District	Neelagiri Urban Development Authority
9	Mancherial	Mancherial district	Mancherial Urban Development Authority
10	Kodangal	Vikarabad District	Kodangal Area Development Authority

=== Uttar Pradesh ===
Rank	City	District	Urban Development Authority
1	Kanpur	Kanpur	Kanpur Development Authority

=== Uttarakhand ===
Rank	City	District	Urban Development Authority
1	Mussoorie, Dehradun	Dehradun	Mussoorie Dehradun Development Authority
2	Haridwar, Roorkee	Haridwar	Haridwar Roorkee Development Authority

=== West Bengal ===
Rank	City	District	Urban Development Authority
1	Kolkata	Kolkata	Kolkata Improvement Trust
2	Kolkata	Kolkata	Kolkata Metropolitan Development Authority
3	Siliguri	Siliguri	Siliguri Jalpaiguri Development Authority
4	Kolkata	Kolkata	West Bengal Housing Infrastructure Development Corporation

=== Delhi ===
Rank	City	District	Urban Development Authority
1	Delhi	Delhi	Delhi Development Authority
