= Dewas Gate Inter State Bus Stand =

Coordinates: 23.181°N 75.782°E

Dewas Gate Inter State Bus Stand Shaheed Raja Bhau Mahakal Bus Stand

General information
- Location: Ujjain, Madhya Pradesh; India
- System: Bus Stand
- Owner: Ujjain Municipal Corporation
- Operator: Ujjain Municipal Corporation

Construction
- Structure type: At Grade
- Platform levels: 1
- Parking: Yes

History
- Rebuilt: 2014

Services
Inter-state
Location

Shaheed Raja Bhau Mahakal Bus Stand or Dewas Gate Inter State Bus Stand is a bus terminus in Ujjain, Madhya Pradesh. Dewas Gate is a bus terminus that provides bus service to destinations located in other states. Nana Kheda is the largest Bus stand in Madhya Pradesh. Dewas Gate may also provide bus services to destinations in the same state.

Bus Stand is the main bus stand at time of Simhastha. Buses are available for Jaipur, Ajmer, Indore, Bhopal, Pune, Gujarat, Maharashtra, Rajasthan and various other locations.
