= Urban Development Authority =

Urban Development Authority may also refer to:

== Organizations and enterprises ==
- Urban Development Authority (India) - statutory civic bodies for planned development of a city or region
- UDA Holdings - formerly Urban Development Authority of Malaysia, now a publicly listed company.
- Urban Redevelopment Authority (URA) - national urban planning authority of Singapore
- Urban Development Authority of Sri Lanka - Sri Lankan government ministry responsible for planning and implementation of economic, social, and physical development.
