= Vikram Udyog Nagari =

- Planned City
- Nickname: VUN
- Interactive map of Vikram Udyog Nagari
- Coordinates: 23.4040°N 75.5433°E
- Country: India
- State: Madhya Pradesh
- District: Ujjain
- Named for: Vikramaditya

Government
  - Body: Ujjain Municipal Corporation

Languages
  - Official: Malvi, Hindi
- Time zone: UTC+5:30 (IST)
- Telephone code: +91
- Vehicle registration: MP-13
- Website: www.ujjain.nic.in

Vikram Udyog Nagari is an upcoming business district in Ujjain, India. The Government of Madhya Pradesh has allotted 1,200 acres for the development of an industrial area on the Dewas-Ujjain Road near Narwar village. Japan Bank for International Cooperation and Japan International Cooperation Agency will lend funds for the project.

== History ==
Originally named Vikramaditya Knowledge City, the area was envisioned as an educational hub. Due to reduced investment prospects, it was renamed to Vikram Udyog Nagari or Vikram Industrial City.

Stakeholders in the project include the Government of Madhya Pradesh and the Delhi Mumbai Industrial Corridor Trust. The district is projected to include office space, residential areas, supporting facilities and educational institutions such as Industrial Training Institutes (ITIs), engineering colleges and medical colleges. It will also form part of Ujjain Smart City project. This will be the first planned city in the state of Madhya Pradesh.
