= Maksi =

- city
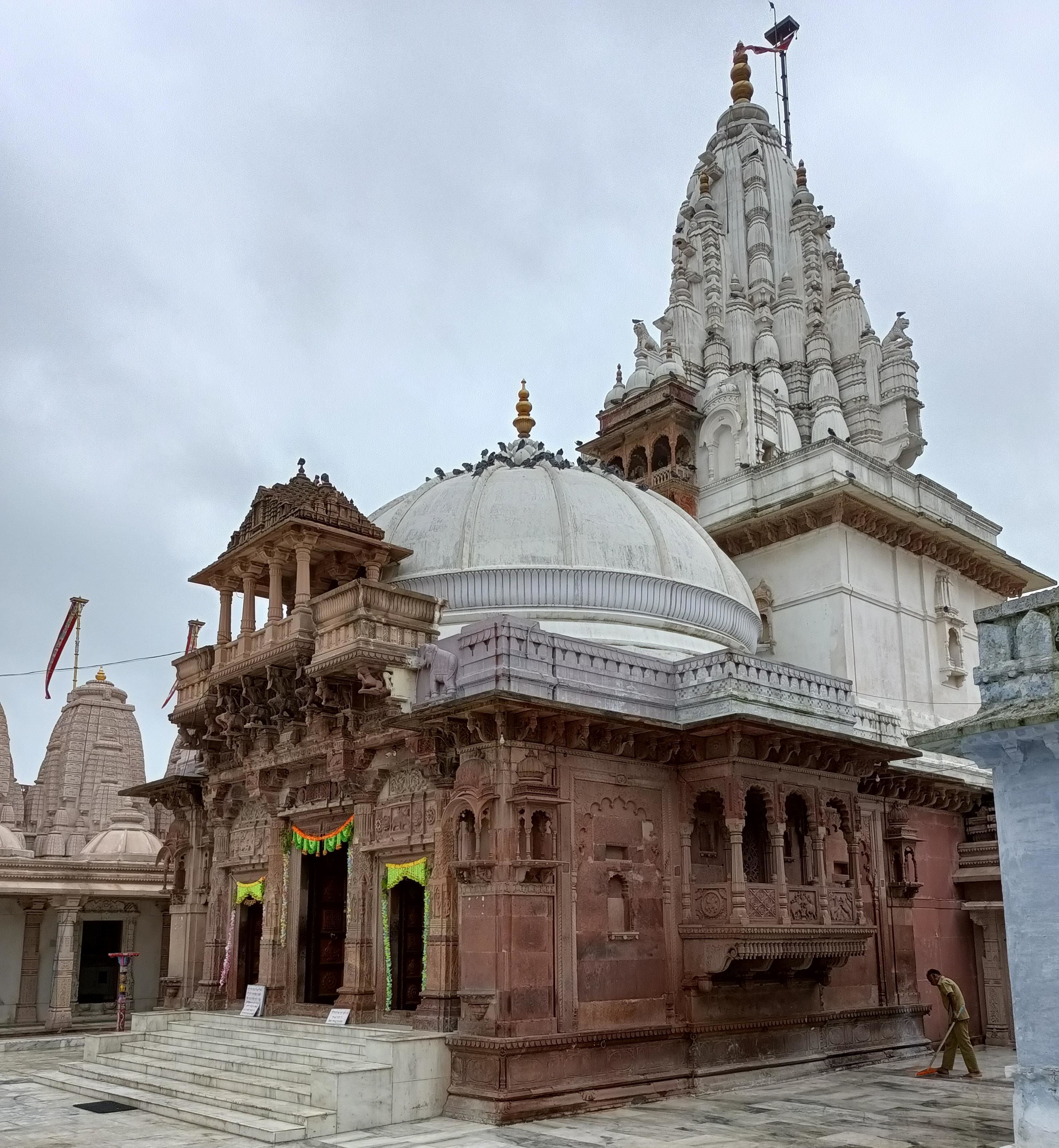
- Maksi Jain temple

- Location in Madhya Pradesh, India Maksi (India)
- Coordinates: 23.27°N 76.15°E
- Country: India
- State: Madhya Pradesh
- District: Shajapur
- Elevation: 480 m (1,570 ft)

Population (2001)
  - Total: 98,392

Languages
  - Official: Hindi
- Time zone: UTC+5:30 (IST)
- Telephone code: 07363

Maksi is a city and a municipality in Shajapur district in the Indian state of Madhya Pradesh. It is famous for its Maksi Parshwanathh Ji Jain temple.

== Geography ==
Maksi is located at 23.27°N 76.15°E. It has an average elevation of 480 metres (1574 feet).

== Demographics ==
As of 2011 India census, Maksi had a population of 98,392. Male constitute 52% of the population and females 48%. Maksi has an average literacy rate of 63%, higher than the national average of 59.5%: male literacy is 73%, and female literacy is 53%. In Maksi, 17% of the population is under six years of age.

== Jain Pilgrimage ==
Maksi is an ancient place of pilgrimage for Jains. There are two ancient temples here. The first one is the bigger temple called Bada Mandir and it belongs to the Śvetāmbara sect. The principal deity here is a 2500-year old idol of Parshvanatha. The second temple is of Suparshwanatha and belongs to the Digambara sect.

Maksi Parshvanatha is considered to be a holy place for Śvetāmbara Jains. It is one of the 108 prominent idols of Parshvanatha of Śvetāmbara Jains. People believe that idol of Parshvanatha was found from this stepwell.

== Transportation ==
Maksi is located on the Agra-Mumbai Road and has direct train connectivity to Ujjain, Dewas, Bhopal, and Ruthiyai.
