= District Planning Committee =

Type of government body in India

A district planning committee (DPC) is the committee created as per article 243ZD of the Constitution of India at the district level for planning at the district and below. The committee in each district should consolidate the plans prepared by the Panchayats and the municipalities in the district and prepare a draft development plan for the district.

== Functions of DPC ==
The Constitution of India provides the DPCs two specific responsibilities. In preparing the draft development plan, the DPC shall have regard to matters of common interest between the Panchayats and the municipalities, including spatial planning, sharing of water and other physical and natural resources, the integrated development of infrastructure and environmental conservation and the extent and type of available resources, both financial or otherwise. The DPC in this endeavor, is also mandated to consult such institutions and organizations as may be specified. In order that the plans at different levels are prepared, there is need to strengthen the system comprising the machinery of planning and the process of consolidation of plans at the district level.

There is confusion in states as to whether the DPC is to be established as a separate and permanent office or whether it denotes only a meeting that is periodically called and which can be serviced by a part-time secretariat. There is a feeling that the DPC ought not to emerge as yet another layer of bureaucracy to vet people's plans. At the same time, the fact that the DPC is held intermittently and without permanent support undermines its effectiveness as a constitutional institution and a coordinating mentor. On balance, the DPC merits the status of a permanent institution, with adequate secretariat to service it at the district level. It could also be provided the means of drawing experts to assist it whenever required.

== Status of DPCs in the states ==
All states and union territories except Meghalaya, Mizoram, Nagaland, Jammu and Kashmir, Ladakh, and Delhi are required to set up district planning committees in accordance with Article 243ZD of the Constitution of India. But the status, as of financial year 2007-08 is as follows:

Table : Status of district planning committees in the states
Sl No	States/Union Territories	Status of constitution of DPCs
1	Andhra Pradesh	Not yet constituted.
2	Arunachal Pradesh	Not yet constituted.
3	Assam	Not yet constituted.
4	Bihar	Yes. Chairperson of District Council is the Chairperson of DPC.
5	Chhattisgarh	Yes. District in-charge Minister is the Chairperson of DPC.
6	Goa	Yes. Chairperson of District Council is the Chairperson of DPC
7	Gujarat	Not yet constituted.
8	Haryana	Yes. District in-charge Minister is the Chairperson of DPC.
9	Himachal Pradesh	Yes. District in-charge Minister is the Chairperson of DPC.
10	Karnataka	Yes. Chairperson of District Council is the Chairperson of DPC.
11	Jharkhand	Yes. Panchayat elections yet to be held.
12	Kerala	Yes. President of District Panchayat is the Chairperson of DPC. The District Collector is the Member Secretary of DPC.
13	Madhya Pradesh	Yes. District in-charge Minister is the Chairperson of DPC.
14	Maharashtra	Yes. District in-charge Minister is the Chairperson of DPC.
15	Manipur	Yes in 4 districts. Chairperson of District Council is the Chairperson of DPC.
16	Odisha	Yes in 26 districts. Senior-most Member of the Legislative Assembly of the district is the Chairperson of DPC.
17	Punjab	Not yet constituted.
18	Rajasthan	Yes. Chairperson of District Council is the Chairperson of DPC.
19	Sikkim	Yes.
20	Telangana	Not yet constituted.
21	Tamil Nadu	Yes. Chairperson of District Council is the Chairperson of DPC.
22	Tripura	Not yet constituted.
23	Uttar Pradesh	Yes. District in-charge Minister is the Chairperson of DPC.
24	Uttarakhand	DPCs are not notified or constituted, even though legal provision exists.
25	West Bengal	Yes. Chairperson of District Council is the Chairperson of DPC.
26	Andaman and Nicobar Islands	Yes. Chairperson of District Council is the Chairperson of DPC
27	Chandigarh	Not yet constituted.
28	Dadra and Nagar Haveli and Daman and Diu	Yes. Chairman of District Council is the Chairperson of DPC.
29	Lakhshadeep	Yes. District Magistrate is the Chairperson of DPC.
30	Puducherry	Yes. Panchayat elections yet to be held.

It is clear that the steps taken to operationalize the provisions of Article 243 ZD of the Constitution of India, by the States, have been unsatisfactory. Despite its shortcomings, DPC should become a fulcrum of planning effort in a district and should be enabled to develop the capacity to undertake expected tasks.

== An analysis of DPCS ==
An analysis of the functioning of DPCs and the formulation and implementation of ‘district plans’ in 14 states reveals the following:-

- In most states DPCs are yet to function as envisaged in the Constitution. They neither consolidate nor prepare draft district developmental plans.
- Very few states are preparing district plans even though some of them allocate funds to the district sector
- In several states, where there is no separation of the budget into district and state sectors, allocation of funds to Panchayats does not match the legislative devolution of functions to them.
- Funds given to Panchayats are tied down to schemes, thus limiting the scope for determining and addressing local priorities through a planning exercise. In this regard, CSSs pertaining to functions devolved to Panchayats now constitute the largest element of such tied funds.
- Actual provision in state budgets also differs from the gross outlays communicated. Some states do not provide matching funds to centrally sponsored schemes, reducing the actual flow of funds for such schemes to local governments.
- Planning is of poor quality and is generally a mere collection of schemes and works, many of the works suggested by elected panchayat members themselves is an ad-hoc manner. Integration of Gram and Taluk Panchayat plans into the district plan, even when done, also tends to be mere summation and not a synergistic integration. This is further distorted by placing funds with MPs and MLAs, whose utilization falls outside the pale of any planning.
- Since the so-called planning exercise follows certain chain of events at the state level as regards finalization of budgets and plans, its quality suffers seriously for lack of sufficient time. Thus detailed guidelines regarding consultation, consideration and decision making at different levels remain largely on paper and the planning process does not stir meaningful debate in Panchayats.
- In the absence of a well functioning district planning machinery, taking decisions on the priorities of a district is often left to officials, guided by district development committees, which consist largely of elected representatives of legislatures and members of Parliament and some nominated members, sometimes including elected representatives of Panchayats.
- The above table stands corrected and the DPC in Arunachal Pradesh have been constituted with the Zila Parishad chairperson as its head.

== Establishment of DPCs: Efforts ==
The first step is to ensure that DPCs are set up in all states in accordance with Article 243 ZD of the Constitution. In spite of the resolutions of the Second Round Table to set up DPCs as mandated by the Constitution and efforts by the Ministry of Panchayati Raj to persuade all states, some states are still dragging their feet in this regard. The Ministry of Panchayati Raj addressed all Secretaries of Panchayati Raj in states on 30 May 2005 requesting them to constitute DPCs in their respective states if the same had not been constituted. Their attention was also drawn to the meeting of the Committee of Chief Secretaries and Secretaries of Panchayati Raj in the states/union territories held on 11 April 2005 wherein the Ministry of Panchayati Raj had communicated that the states that had not constituted DPCs in accordance with Article 243ZD of the Constitution should do so before 31 October 2005. However, this was not achieved. The steps taken by this Expert Group and the circular issued by the Planning Commission to all states regarding formulation of the Annual plans of states has already been referred to in Chapter 2. While the circular marked an important step forward and would give an impetus to the endeavor to establish and strengthen district planning committees, detailed instructions were issued to all states and central ministries prior to eleventh plan discussions on the following points:

- CSS guidelines that entrust the task of district level planning and implementation to parallel bodies, such as DRDAs and District Health Societies, need to be modified to incorporate the district planning committee in the process of district level planning.
- The Planning Commission could inform states that the DPC would be the sole body that is entrusted with the task of consolidating plans at the district level.
- The Planning Commission could specify a time frame within which states will need to issue detailed instructions covering the manner in which the DPC would perform its functions.

== Support to DPCs ==
The need to provide professional support to the DPC cannot be overstated. Though several states have provided staff from the state level on deputation to District Panchayats for the purpose of undertaking planning, such Staff are overburdened and ill-equipped. There is a need to create, preferably within the District Panchayat, a separate cell to service the District Planning Committee. The Cell could have five separate and distinct sections, namely, dealing with Municipal Plans, District Panchayat Plans, Intermediate Panchayat Plans, Village Panchayat Plans and one for maintenance of data and undertake research, with the necessary support in terms of IT and qualified research assistants.

- There must be a full-time professionally qualified District Planning Officer to head the District Planning Unit. If such persons are unavailable in the government, appointments of professionals on contract or outsourcing are options to be considered and acted upon.
- Institutional support through universities and research institutions, both at the district and state level, could be identified for assisting the DPC in planning, monitoring and evaluation.
- The Planning Commission should continue to provide the required support for district planning as was done earlier, except that this would now be provided to the DPC.

== Enabling DPC functioning ==
The aim of drawing experts is to assist the local governments concerned (Panchayats and Urban Local Bodies) in both forming a vision and designing strategies to attain that vision. Advice of the experts would be based on experience, expertise and the field position, as revealed from ground data. Special efforts ought to be made by states to ensure that the best talent and the most motivated are invited to participate as experts. The following points are recommended by the Ministry of Panchayati Raj, Government of India, to guide the drawing of experts to support the DPC:

- Experts could be assigned to work either individually or in teams. They could be taken on a part-time basis, an assignment basis or full-time, if the need arises.
- It is for the state to determine the number of experts that can be drawn to assist the DPC. This could depend upon the extent of devolution in each state.
- Though ideally they are best drawn locally, experts can be drawn even from outside the jurisdiction of the district, if required. Care must be taken to ensure that participation is voluntary, above partisan politics and able to respect different points of view.
- With growing urbanization of smaller and intermediate sized towns, there is need to especially draw in experts on municipal matters and the urban rural interphase to assist the DPC in planning for local resource sharing, area planning, solid waste and sewage disposal and other such matters which call for close coordination between Panchayats and Municipalities.

The DPC could also constitute a few sectoral sub-committees for both the envisioning and the consolidation processes. The task of sectoral Sub Committees is to go into the details of each development sector assigned, such as proper quantification and description of service available in the sector, whether these meet the norms prescribed, the gaps that need to be filled and track data availability, in consultation with local Bodies, public and private organizations before finalizing the vision of that Sector. Once the Sectoral Vision document is prepared, it shall be submitted to the DPC. Sectoral sub-committees could also give suggestions for innovative plans and integrated projects, which local governments may accept if they so desire.

One of the primary tasks of the DPC would be to build capacity for decentralized planning in the district. A major impediment to proper planning is the lack of personnel providing planning support and availability of good and comprehensible information at the Intermediate and Gram Panchayat levels. Provision of support for planning at the Intermediate Panchayat level: Each Intermediate Panchayat should be provided a planning and data unit, which could also be integrated into the larger concept of having a Resource Centre at each Intermediate Panchayat level, to provide a basket of pooled services, such as for engineering, agriculture, watershed development, women and child care, public health etc., which Gram Panchayats can draw upon for support in planning and implementation.

== See also ==
- List of planning agencies in India
