= Kinjal Singh =

Indian Administrative Service officer

Kinjal Singh IAS
- Born: 5 January 1982 (age 44); Ballia, Uttar Pradesh
- Education: Lady Shri Ram College
- Occupations: IAS officer, Civil servant
- Years active: 2008–present
- Employer: Government of India
- Organization: Indian Administrative Service
- Spouse: Abhay Singh
- Parents: K. P. Singh (father); Vibha Singh (mother)

Kinjal Singh is an Indian Administrative Service officer working as the Director General of Medical Education in Uttar Pradesh. She is the former vice chairman of the Kanpur Development Authority.

== Early life ==
Kinjal Singh was born on 5 January 1982 in Ballia, Uttar Pradesh, to a Hindu family of K. P. Singh and Vibha Singh. In 2013, she married Abhay Singh, an Indian Administrative Service officer of the same batch.

== Education ==
Kinjal Singh completed her education at the Lady Shri Ram College, New Delhi.

== Career ==
Kinjal Singh is an IAS officer of the 2008 batch. She started her career as a Joint Magistrate of Lucknow in 2010. In 2012, Kinjal held the post of district magistrate and collector of Bahraich. She was former Director General of Medical Education in Uttar Pradesh. She is currently Transport Commissioner in Uttar Pradesh.
