= Siddhwat Temple =

Coordinates: 23°13′26″N 75°46′37″E

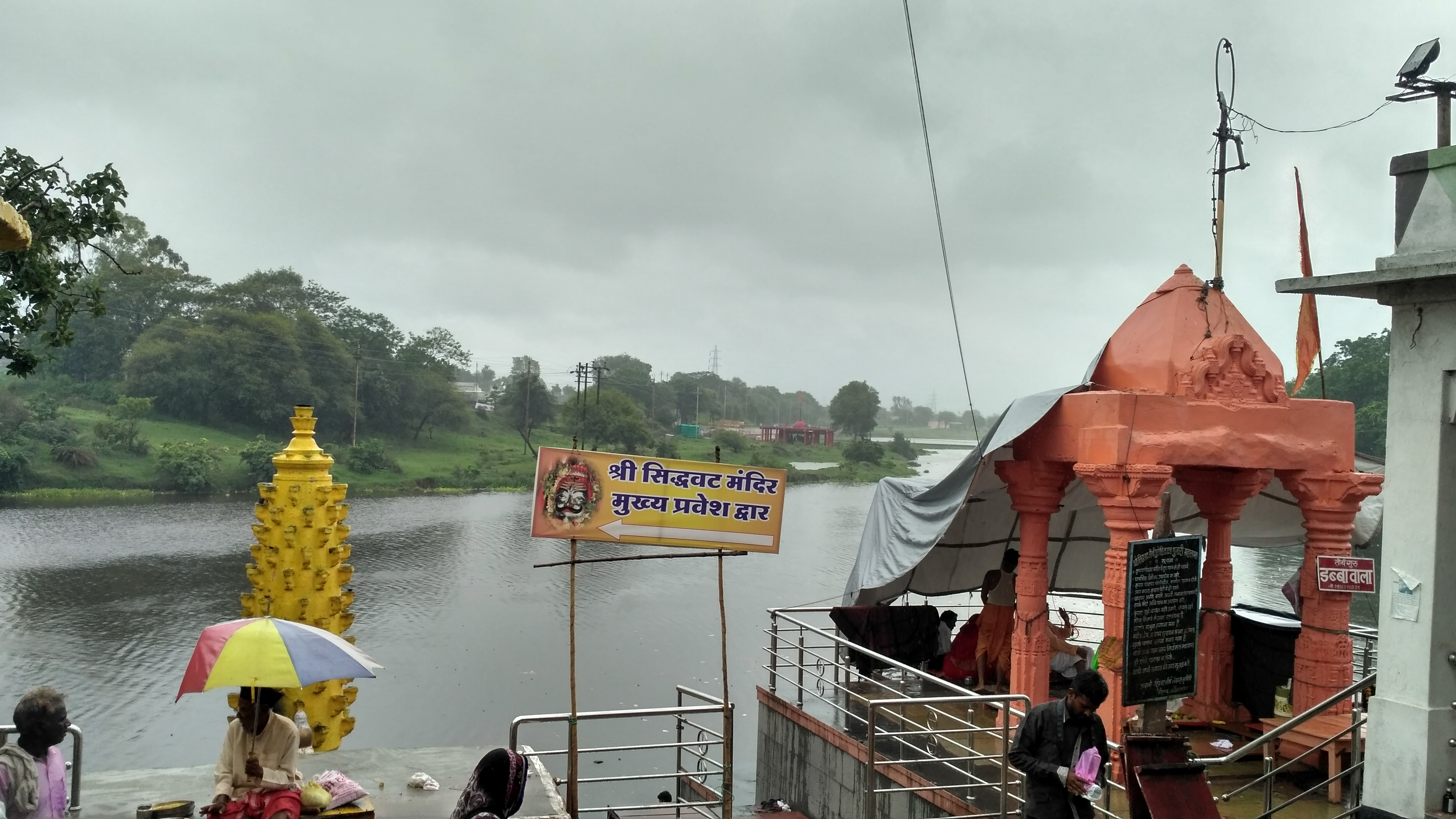

Location of Siddhwat Temple in Madhya Pradesh

Siddhwat temple (also spelled Siddhavat) is located at Bhairavgarh, Ujjain (MP), India at the banks of Shipra river. This temple is also known as Shaktibhed shrine. The temple is one of the sites where Kumbh Mela is celebrated.

There are three types of accomplishment here: child, property and virtuousness. Puja is performed here for all three. Rituals are done for Sadgati (the ancestors). People used to tie a thread on the Banyan tree for property. Lakshmi work and Reverse Satiya (Swastik) are made for the attainment of a child.

The Bhairvgarh village near Siddhwat has been known for centuries for its tie and dye painting.
