= Nana Kheda Inter State Bus Terminal =

Pandit Deendayal Upadhyay Bus Stand Nana Kheda Bus Stand

General information
- Location: Ujjain, Madhya Pradesh; India
- Coordinates: 23.1585°N 75.7879°E
- System: Bus Stand
- Owner: Ujjain Municipal Corporation
- Operator: Ujjain Municipal Corporation
- Platforms: 12

Construction
- Structure type: At Grade
- Platform levels: 1
- Parking: Yes

History
- Opened: 1992
- Rebuilt: 2014

Services
Inter-state
Location

Nana Kheda Bus Stand or Pandit Deendayal Upadhyay Bus Stand is a bus terminus in Ujjain, Madhya Pradesh. It is a bus terminus that provides bus services within the state and also to destinations located in other states. And is the largest bus stand in Madhya Pradesh.

== History ==
The Bus Stand was built in 1992 just before Simhastha. It is spread over 12.5 acres of land with coast of 150 crores. Buses are available for Jaipur, Ajmer, Indore, Bhopal, Pune, Gujarat, Maharashtra, Rajasthan and various other locations.
