= Dibrugarh Development Authority =

Dibrugarh Urban Development Authority
Agency overview
- Type: Urban Planning Agency
- Headquarters: FWC7+M7M, Ttiloi Bari, Chowkidingee, Dibrugarh, Assam 786001
- Ministers responsible: -, Chief Minister; -, Roads and Buildings
- Agency executives: -, Chairman; -, Vice Chairman
- Parent agency: Government of Assam
- Website: https://tcp.assam.gov.in/information-services/development-authorities

Dibrugarh Development Authority is statutory civic body created for the development of Infrastructure and Housing projects in planned way in Indian city of Dibrugarh. The foundation for current Indian Urban Development Authority is based on the structure designed during British Colonial Government era as a result of Bombay plague in 1896. Urban Development Authority for each town is created as per 74th amendment of Constitution of India. The authority consists of planners and bureaucrats who are specialised in civic planning. The officials of the authority work with local State Governments in town planning activities.

== History and Objective ==
Dibrugarh Urban Development Authority was formed and consists of a group of non bureaucratic individuals and agencies who are responsible for planning Infrastructure development in Indian cities. The individuals are specialised in various aspects of town planning activities.

Dibrugarh Urban Development Authority is governed by Chairman Akhim Hazarika.

== Activities ==
Dibrugarh Urban Development Authority planners are responsible for the following.

- Ensuring that Town planning schemes are implemented.
- Creating and implementing development plan of master plan for notified areas.
- Creation and implementation of urban area development initiatives like affordable housing, slum dwellers development.
- Implementation of Local Area Plan for the improvement of existing areas.
- Modernising building laws.
- Transit oriented development is promoted,
- Inclusion of conversion of heritage buildings in local area plans.
- Social and economic development planning.

== Challenges ==
Dibrugarh Urban Development Authority planners are faced with following challenges:

- Meeting housing needs of urban settlers.
- Investment on development initiatives.
- Resolving drinking water issues.
- Resolving sanitation issues.

== See also ==
- Urban Development Authority (India)
