= Ujjain Development Authority =

- उज्जैन विकास प्राधिकरण

State agency overview
- Formed: 13 January 1973
- Type: Urban planning
- Jurisdiction: Government of Madhya Pradesh
- Headquarters: Ujjain, Madhya Pradesh, India; 23°9′43″N 75°48′1″E
- Minister responsible: Shivraj Singh Chouhan, Chief Minister of Madhya Pradesh
- State agency executive: Shyam Bansal, Chairman
- Parent department: Government of Madhya Pradesh
- Website: http://udaujjain.org/uda/

Ujjain Development Authority also known as UDA is the urban planning agency serving Ujjain Division of the Indian state of Madhya Pradesh. The headquarters of the Ujjain Development Authority is Bharatpuri, Ujjain. It was established in 1973 under Madhya Pradesh Town and Country Planning Act, 1973.

== Departments ==
The authority is divided into twelve departments.

1. Engineering
2. Finance
3. Town planning
4. Architecture
5. Legal
6. Monitoring
7. Enforcement
8. Vigilance
9. Establishment and Authority
10. Policy
11. Land acquisition
12. Information technology

== Development Works ==
- Infrastructural Development
- Development of Commercial and Residential Scheme
- Development and Rehabilitation
- Preparation and Implementation
- Environmental Development

== Projects ==
- Vedic Shodh Sansthan and Gausala at Chitaman
- Madhav Nagar Government Hospital a 100-bedded hospital at Madhav Nagar
- Provident Fund Zonal Training Centre, Mahashweta Nagar
- Provident Fund Office Building, Mahashweta Nagar
- Provident Fund Residential Complex, Mahashweta Nagar
- Nana Kheda Inter State Bus Terminal, Nana Kheda
- Mahakal Dharamshala
- Pravachan Hall
- Ujjain Sport Arena
- Harsiddhi Dharamshala, Harsiddhi
- Kalidasa Akademi
- Mahamritunjay Dwar
- Mahatma Jyotiba Phule Sabji Mandi
- Pt. Surya Narayan Vyas Multicultural Complex
- Dr. Vishnu Shridhar Wakankar Highlevel Bridge
- Planatarium and Antariksha Vihar
- Dongla Observatory
- Maharshi Panini Sanskrit University

== See also ==
- Urban planning
