= Vadodara Urban Development Authority =

Government body in Vadodara, Gujarat, India

Coordinates: 22.3244°N 73.1969°E

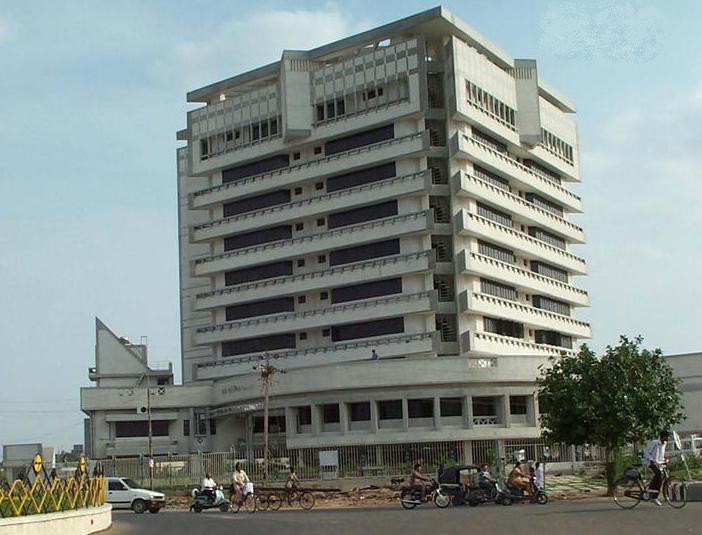
VUDA Office Building

The Vadodara Urban Development Authority is a civilian government body responsible for overseeing and sanctioning construction and infrastructure development across the suburbs of the city of Vadodara, in the state of Gujarat in India.

The office of VUDA is at Karelibaug Near L&T Circle(parth), Vadodara. Following a merger of four gram panchayats of Vadodara district with the Vadodara Municipal Corporation, the area of working of VUDA has been limited. It serves 98 villages around Vadodara.

VUDA's main function is to prepare a macro plan i.e. a development plan for a horizon of 20 years for the Vadodara Urban agglomeration area. The area is demarcated based on functional criteria and thus accommodates areas of VMC as well as outgrowth covering municipalities and village panchayats. It mainly provides guided and planned development for the outgrowth of the city. For the area within the VMC jurisdiction, VUDA earmarks land for micro planning like town planning schemes (TP schemes). The TP schemes within the VMC area are prepared by the corporation and submitted to the Gujarat state government through VUDA.
