= Rajkot Urban Development Authority =

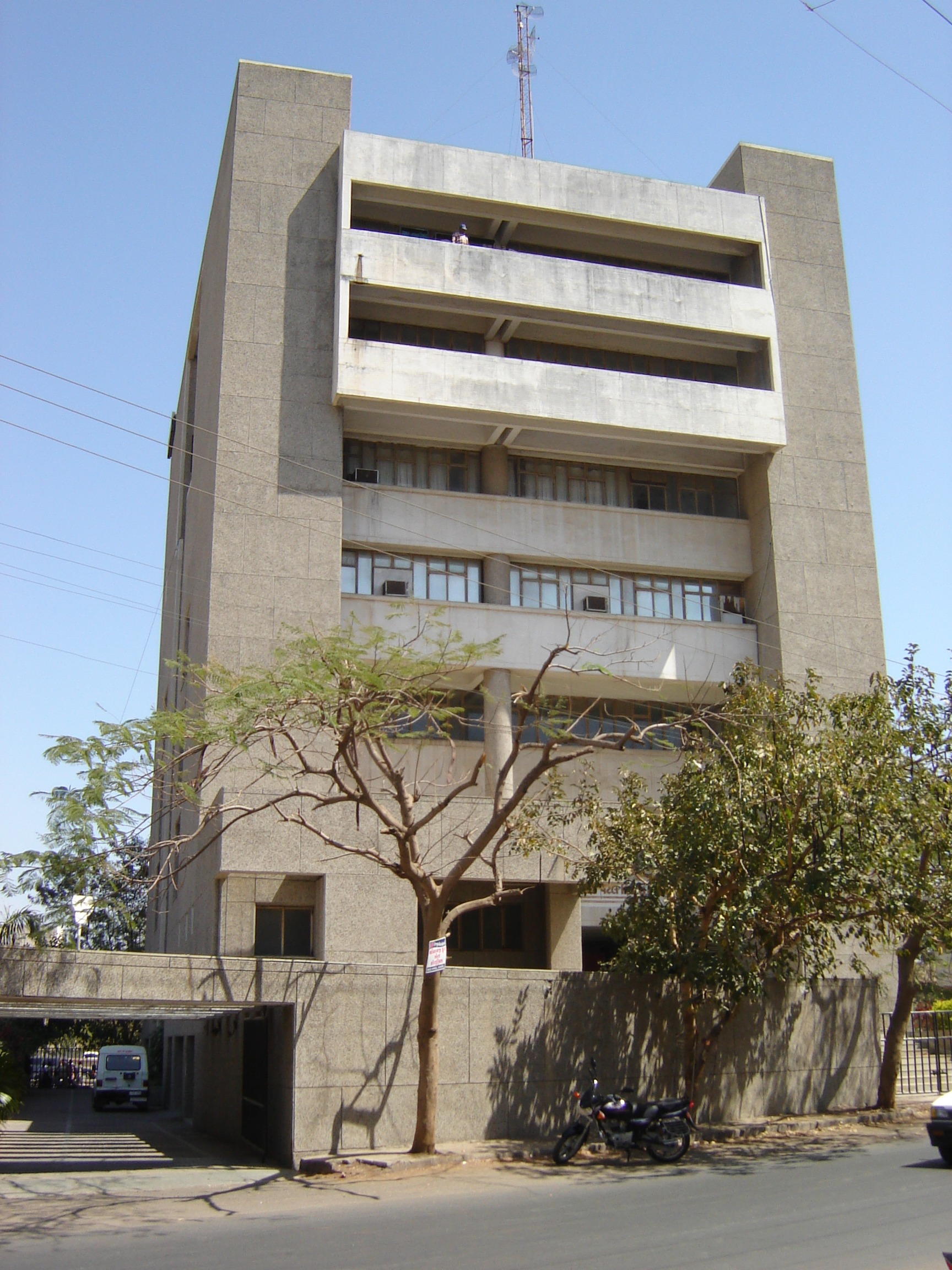
RUDA, Chimanbhai Patel Vikas Bhavan, Rajkot

The Rajkot Urban Development Authority is a civilian government body tasked with overseeing and approving construction and infrastructure development in the suburbs of Rajkot, in the state of Gujarat in India. The office of RUDA is at Chimanbhai Patel Vikas Bhavan, Jamanagar Road, Rajkot.

== History and Present ==
Government of Gujarat passed bill under the Gujarat Town Planning & Urban Development Act, 1976. As per the guidelines of this bill Rajkot Urban Development Authority (RUDA) is constituted on 1 February 1976. RUDA has covered area of 483 km² including area of Rajkot Municipal Corporation and 39 villages in the periphery of the Rajkot Municipal Corporation. RUDA has covered 35 villages of Rajkot taluka, 11 villages of Lodhika taluka, 5 villages of Padadhari taluka, 2 villages of Kotada Sangani taluka and a village of Tankara taluka.

Geographically Rajkot is situated in the heart of Saurashtra (region) of Gujarat State. Throbbing with commercial activities, in the backdrop of new globalized economic and industrial policy, Rajkot is the biggest city in terms of population in Saurashtra-Kutch Region. It is well connected with the whole of Saurashtra-Kutch Region and other parts of the States through National Highway, State Highway, Railways and Airlines.

It was a princely State prior to independence and during the British Regime considering its geo-climatic factor and state of its industrial growth, Rajkot was made the headquarters of political agent and offices of all princely states of Saurashtra were established here. It became the State Capital of Saurashtra State after independence. After independence and formation of Gujarat State, Rajkot became the focal point of Saurashtra-Kutch Region through its rapid social, cultural, commercial, educational, political and industrial activities. As a result of increased urbanization, the villages on the fringe of Rajkot City became an integral part of Rajkot for all purposes.
