= Anantapuramu–Hindupur Urban Development Authority =

Anantapuramu-Hindupur Urban Development Authority

Agency overview
- Formed: 4 November 2016
- Type: Urban Planning Agency
- Jurisdiction: Government of Andhra Pradesh
- Headquarters: Anantapuramu; 14.68°N 77.599°E

The Anantapuramu–Hindupur Urban Development Authority (AHUDA) is an urban planning agency in Anantapur district and Sri Sathya Sai districts of the Indian state of Andhra Pradesh. It was constituted on 4 November 2017, under Andhra Pradesh Metropolitan Region and Urban Development Authority Act, 2016 with the headquarters located at Anantapuramu.

== Jurisdiction ==
The jurisdictional area of AHUDA is spread over an area of 2,791.78 km^{2} (1,077.91 sq mi). It covers 177 villages in 18 mandals of Anantapur district and newly formed Sri Sathya Sai district. Anantapuram is the only corporation and two other municipalities viz., Hindupur and Dharmavaram are also a part of AHUDA.
