= Kanpur Development Authority =

Government agency

- कानपुर विकास प्राधिकरण

Agency overview
- Formed: 1973
- Type: Urban Planning Agency
- Jurisdiction: Kanpur Nagar district and Kanpur Dehat district
- Headquarters: Moti Jheel, Kanpur; 18°31′13″N 73°51′24″E
- Minister responsible: Yogi Adityanath, Chief Minister of Uttar Pradesh and Minister of Housing and Urban Planning
- Deputy Minister responsible: Suresh Pasi, Minister of State for Housing and Urban Planning
- Agency executives: Pradeep Kumar Mohanty, IAS, Divisional Commissioner, Kanpur and ex-officio Chairman; Kinjal Singh, IAS, Vice Chairman
- Parent agency: Department of Housing and Urban Planning, Government of Uttar Pradesh
- Website: Official Website

Kanpur Development Authority is the urban development agency of Kanpur metropolitan area, Uttar Pradesh, India. As the industries in Kanpur grew faster the village population also attracted towards the city. In present time the population of Kanpur city has crossed 30 lakhs(3 million). Due to the rate of growth in population, it was decided that a development authority should be constituted. Region administered by Kanpur Development Authority and Unnao-Shuklaganj Development Authority comes under Kanpur Metropolitan Area. There has been a proposal to merge both the authorities to form Kanpur Metropolitan Area Development Authority (KMADA).

In accordance to the Uttar Pradesh Urban Development Act, 1973 Kanpur Development Authority was constituted.

== Organization ==
The development of infrastructure in Kanpur is overseen by Kanpur Development Authority (KDA), which comes under the Housing Department of Uttar Pradesh government. The Divisional Commissioner of Kanpur acts as the ex-officio Chairman of KDA, whereas a Vice Chairman, a government-appointed IAS officer, looks after the daily matters of the authority. The current Divisional Commissioner and ex-officio Chairman is Pradeep Kumar Mohanty, whereas the current Vice-Chairman of Kanpur Development Authority is Arvind Singh.

=== Board ===
Board of Kanpur Development Authority
Post	Designation
Commissioner, Kanpur Division	Chairman
Vice Chairman, Kanpur Development Authority	Member
Secretary, Housing	Member
Secretary, Finance	Member
District Magistrate and Collector, Kanpur	Member
District Magistrate and Collector, Kanpur Dehat	Member
Municipal Commissioner, Kanpur	Member
Chief Town and Country Planner	Member
Managing Director, Uttar Pradesh Jal Nigam	Member
Director, Sarvajanik Udyam Bureau	Member

== Master Plan ==
Kanpur Development Authority has Master plans (2021) for Kanpur, Akbarpur and Bithoor.

Proposed Master Plan for Kanpur City, Year 2021 by KDA

- Residential : 41.67%
- Industrial : 5.64%
- Amenities : 3.7%
- Transport & communication : 9.98%
- Recreational : 9.56%
- Public Services : 3.81%
- Trade : 2.61%
- Other uses : 9.27%

== See also ==
1. Kanpur
