= Cuttack Development Authority =

Indian local agency

Kataka Development Authority
Agency overview
- Formed: 1 September 1983
- Jurisdiction: Government of Odisha
- Headquarters: Arunodaya Bhawan, Link Road, Cuttack
- Minister responsible: Pratap Jena, Cabinet Minister, Housing and Urban Development Department
- Agency executives: Surendra Kumar, (IAS), Chairman; G. Mathivathanan (IAS), Principal Secretary
- Website: www.cdacuttack.nic.in

The Kataka Development Authority [ formerly Cuttack Development Authority (CDA) ] is an agency which is responsible for development and beautification of Cuttack, the Silver city of Odisha, India. It was established on 1 September 1983.

CDA is responsible for creating development plans, regulating development and land use, constructing housing colonies, commercial complexes, and providing public amenities like water supply, drainage, sewerage, transportation, and social facilities.
