= Thiruvananthapuram Development Authority =

Thiruvananthapuram Development Authority (TRIDA)
Agency overview
- Formed: 1980
- Jurisdiction: Government of Kerala
- Headquarters: Vazhuthacaud, Thiruvananthapuram - 695 010
- Minister responsible: K. M. Shaji, Minister for Local Self Governments
- Agency executives: Vacant, Chairman; Bini. K. U, Member Secretary
- Parent agency: Local Self Government Department, Government of Kerala
- Website: Official Website

== History ==
The Thiruvananthapuram Development Authority (TRIDA) was constituted in 1980 under the Travancore Town Planning Act. Its creation marked a shift toward planned and scientific urban development in Kerala’s capital city. During its formative years, TRIDA has overseen land use regulation, housing schemes, and infrastructure modernization projects across the city and adjoining panchayats. Now the functions of TRIDA are determined by the provisions in The Kerala Town And Country Planning Act, 2016

== Jurisdiction ==
TRIDA presently has jurisdiction over the area comprised in the Thiruvananthapuram Corporation and five surrounding Panchayats: Vilappil, Vilavoorkkal, Pallichal, Kalliyoor, and Venganoor.

== Governance ==
TRIDA consists of (a) the General Council; and (b) the Executive Committee headed by the Chairman of TRIDA (ex-officio), and a Member Secretary who shall be the Chief Executive of the Authority

The Government shall appoint the Chairman, who shall hold office during the pleasure of the Government, provided that the term of office of the Chairman shall not in any case exceed five years. The Member Secretary shall be an officer of the Government not below the rank of a Town Planner with not less than ten years of experience in Town and Country Planning or Municipal Administration

The General Council is the policy making body for determining the lines on which the improvement and development of the area within TRIDA's jurisdiction shall proceed and shall have the power to review the actions of the Executive Committee in implementing the policies determined by the General Council. The executive powers of TRIDA vests with the Executive Committee and the Committee shall be responsible for carrying out the powers and functions of the Authority and for giving effect to the policies laid down by the General Council for the improvement and development of the area within TRIDA's jurisdiction

The Government shall prescribe the strength of the General Council, which shall not be less than fifteen or more than thirty, excluding the Chairman. The Government shall fix the strength of the Executive Committee, which shall not be less than five and more than ten, excluding the Chairman.

=== Current Office Holders ===
- Chairman: Vacant
- Member Secretary: Smt. Bini. K. U

=== Preceding Office Holders ===
- Chairman: Sri. K.C. Vikraman
- Member Secretary: Smt. Neethulal. B

== Functions ==
TRIDA’s core responsibilities include:

- Preparation and implementation of land re-adjustment or land pooling or land banking schemes for the purpose of implementation of projects in the Development Authority area
- Promoting planned development as envisaged in the Plans for the development authority area, through tools like Transfer of Development Rights, accommodation reservation etc.
- Set-up special function agencies, if required, and guide, direct and assist them on matters pertaining to their respective functions
- Co-ordination of implementation of Plans under this Act in the Development Authority area;
- Perform such other functions as are supplemental, incidental or consequential to items (i) to (iii) above or as may be directed by the Government, the District Planning Committee or the Metropolitan Planning Committee, as the case may be, from time to time

== Projects ==
Over the years, TRIDA has undertaken several notable projects, including:

- Road widening and junction improvement works in central Thiruvananthapuram.
- Housing development schemes for low‑income groups.
- Modernization of public markets and commercial complexes.
- Initiatives to improve urban transport and pedestrian facilities.

== See also ==
- Urban development authorities in India
- Government of Kerala
