= Stambadri Urban Development Authority =

Agency overview
- Formed: 10 July 2017
- Type: Urban Planning Agency
- Jurisdiction: Government of Telangana
- Headquarters: Khammam; 17.25°N 80.16°E
- Agency executive: Chairman

The Stambadri Urban Development Authority is an urban planning agency in Khammam district of the Indian state of Telangana. It was approved by the state government and has its headquarters at Khammam.
