= Bobbili Urban Development Authority =

Bobbili Urban Development Authority (BUDA)
- బొబ్బిలి నగర అభివృద్ధి సంస్థ

Agency overview
- Formed: 12 February 2019
- Type: Urban Planning Agency
- Jurisdiction: Government of Andhra Pradesh
- Headquarters: Bobbili, Vizianagaram district, Andhra Pradesh

The Bobbili Urban Development Authority (BUDA) is an urban planning agency in Vizianagaram district of the Indian state of Andhra Pradesh. It was constituted on 12 February 2019, under Andhra Pradesh Metropolitan Region and Urban Development Authorities Act, 2016 with the headquarters located at Bobbili.

== Jurisdiction ==
The jurisdictional area of BUDA is spread over an area of 2,247.67 km^{2} (867.83 sq mi) and has a population of 7.52 lakhs. It covers 572 villages in 11 mandals of Vizianagaram. The below table lists the urban areas of BUDA.

Jurisdiction
Settlement Type	Name	Total
Municipalities	Bobbili, Parvathipuram, Salur	3
