= Mangaluru Urban Development Authority =

- Mangaluru Nagrabivriddhi Pradhikara

Planning Authority overview
- Formed: 1988
- Preceding Planning Authority: Mangalore Town Planning Authority
- Jurisdiction: Government of Karnataka
- Headquarters: Mangaluru
- Website: mudamangalore.com

Mangaluru Urban Development Authority (MUDA) is a city planning authority responsible for planning functions of the Indian city of Mangaluru in Karnataka state.

Deputy commissioner of Dakshina Kannada holds the chairman position of MUDA.

== History ==
The "Mangalore Town Planning Authority" was established in 29 Nov 1965, later the organization was reestablished with the present name in the year 1988 by the Government of Karnataka under the Karnataka Urban Development Authority.
