= Jabalpur Development Authority =

Jabalpur Development Authority is a statutory organization under the supervision of the Government of Madhya Pradesh, India which was established after the state government of Madhya Pradesh recognized the urgent need to encourage public-private partnership in the housing sector by forming joint ventures.

Jabalpur Development Authority was established and incorporated on 11 January 1980 with an aim of well planned and balanced development of Jabalpur city. The authority is structured under the town and country planning act 1973 of MP State Govt. and it works under the administration of Housing and Development Ministry of MP Govt.

The symbol of urbanization, which is directly perceived by common people, is "the development of land in an organized manner". The common people do the investment in this activity. JDA provides a platform for people to participate in the development. JDA sells the plots in the scheme.

The function of JDA is to control and regulate the development. If the private developers make plans for any institutional, residential or any other area, then they are required to be approved by JDA. If the plan does not meet the requirement of existing proposal of the master plan then it is not given the approval. In case if the matter is not solved by the JDA then it goes to the TCPO.

The Government of Madhya Pradesh and Jabalpur Development Authority have been vested with the task of developing housing and other civic amenity infrastructures at par with international standards. Jabalpur Development Authority has been a major factor in transformation of city's outlook with its amazing residential projects. With an aim to convert the rustic look of the city to an urban metro, the State Government of Madhya Pradesh founded the Development Authority of Jabalpur. Along with undertaking construction of residential societies and auctioning of plots, Jabalpur Development Authority also builds community centers, shopping areas and office spaces.

The city of Jabalpur is dominated by small-time businessmen and traders, along with large government offices. With the advent of industrialization in India, foreign companies are exploring hitherto untapped geographical areas to cash on cheap labor force. Jabalpur has been caught in the radar of foreign investors for making investments in sectors like -

- Tourism
- Mining
- Textile
- Auto ancillaries
- Banking
- Insurance and financial services
- Food and food products
- Power generation

This rise in industrial boom in Jabalpur led the Madhya Pradesh Government to enter into public-private partnerships in the area of real estate development. This has in fact, propelled the demand for quality infrastructure both, residential and business infrastructure. Jabalpur Development Authority is involved with the construction of a number of projects in different parts of Jabalpur. Jabalpur Development Authority provides, not only residential accommodation but also other amenities of cosmopolitan city life like business facilities, cultural facilities, educational, and health care facilities, large open spaces, green areas, water bodies, sports complex, permanent exhibition complex, modern hospitals, arterial roads, and transport terminals. Further, the Jabalpur Development Authority also provides new business areas with non-polluting, non-offensive, and non-hazardous industrial infrastructure. A major portion of the dwelling units developed by it are meant for EWS, LIG, and MIG categories. The board has so far constructed many housing units belonging to EWS/LIG/MIG/HIG groups for the public on ownership bases. It has also sold developed plots to the public for making houses of their own.

Over the last few years, urban, planned development in Jabalpur has gathered considerable momentum and the contribution of the Jabalpur Development Authority in this regard is worth mentioning.
