= Annamayya Urban Development Authority =

- అన్నమయ్య నగర అభివృద్ధి సంస్థ

Agency overview
- Formed: 1 January 2019
- Type: Urban Planning Agency
- Jurisdiction: Government of Andhra Pradesh
- Headquarters: Kadapa, Andhra Pradesh

The Annamayya Urban Development Authority (AUDA) is an urban planning agency in Kadapa district of the Indian state of Andhra Pradesh. It was constituted on 1 January 2019, under Andhra Pradesh Metropolitan Region and Urban Development Authority Act, 2016 with the headquarters located at Kadapa.

== Jurisdiction ==
The jurisdictional area of AUDA is spread over an area of 12,780.26 km^{2} (4,934.49 sq mi) and has a population of 18.39 lakhs. It covers 520 villages in 41 mandals of Kadapa district. The below table lists the urban areas of AUDA.

Jurisdiction
Settlement Type	Name	Total
Municipal Corporations	Kadapa	1
Municipalities	Rajampet, Badvel, Mydukur, Proddatur, Pulivendula, Rayachoti, Jammalamadugu, Yerraguntla	8
Nagar Panchayat	Kamalapuram	1
