= Ongole Urban Development Authority =

Urban planning agency of Andhra Pradesh, India

Ongole Urban Development Authority (OUDA)

Agency overview
- Formed: 1 January 2019
- Type: Urban Planning Agency
- Jurisdiction: Prakasam, Markapuram and Part of Guntur districts
- Headquarters: Ongole, Prakasam district, Andhra Pradesh; 15.506°N 80.049°E

The Ongole Urban Development Authority (OUDA) is an urban planning agency in Prakasam district of the Indian state of Andhra Pradesh. It was constituted on 1 January 2019, under Andhra Pradesh Metropolitan Region and Urban Development Authorities Act, 2016 with the headquarters located at Ongole.

== Jurisdiction ==
The jurisdictional area of OUDA is spread over an area of 9,320.19 km^{2} (3,598.55 sq mi) and has a population of 18.24 lakhs. It covers 667 villages in 39 mandals of Prakasam and Guntur districts. This 39 Mandals includes 15 villages of two Mandals of Guntur district. The below table lists the urban areas of OUDA.

Jurisdiction
Settlement Type	Name	Total
Municipal Corporations	Ongole	1
Municipalities	Chirala, Kandukur, Markapuram, Vinukonda	3
Nagara Panchayats	Addanki, Chimakurthy, Giddalur, Kanigiri, Darsi, Podili .	
