= Kurnool Urban Development Authority =

- [KUDA]

Agency overview
- Formed: 4 November 2016
- Type: Urban Planning Agency
- Jurisdiction: Government of Andhra Pradesh
- Headquarters: Kurnool; 16.17°N 81.13°E

The Kurnool Urban Development Authority (KUDA) is an urban planning agency in the Kurnool district of the Indian state of Andhra Pradesh. It was constituted on 1 February 2016, under Andhra Pradesh Metropolitan Region and Urban Development Authority Act, 2016 with the headquarters located at Kurnool.

== Jurisdiction ==
The jurisdictional area of KUDA is spread over an area of 2,599.50 square kilometres (1,003.67 sq mi). It covers 123 villages in 9 mandals of Kurnool districts. Kurnool Municipal Corporation, Nandyal Municipality, Dhone Municipality, Bethamcherla Nagar Panchayat and Gudur nagar panchayat are the ulbs present in KUDA.
