= Chittoor Urban Development Authority =

Urban planning agency in Chittoor, Andhra Pradesh, India

Chittoor Urban Development Authority (CHUDA)
Agency overview
- Formed: 12 February 2019
- Type: Urban Planning Agency
- Jurisdiction: Government of Andhra Pradesh
- Headquarters: Chittoor, Andhra Pradesh

The Chittoor Urban Development Authority (abbreviated: CHUDA) is an urban planning agency in Chittoor district of the Indian state of Andhra Pradesh. It was constituted on 12 February 2019, under Andhra Pradesh Metropolitan Region and Urban Development Authorities Act, 2016 with the headquarters located at Chittoor.

== Jurisdiction ==
The jurisdictional area of CHUDA is spread over an area of 3,895.58 km^{2} (1,504.09 sq mi) and has a population of 12,42,315. It covers 457 villages in 23 mandals of Chittoor. The below table lists the urban areas of CHUDA.

Jurisdiction
Settlement Type	Name	Total
Municipal Corporations	Chittoor	1
