= Ujjain =

Ujjain Ujjayini / Avantikā
- Metropolitan city
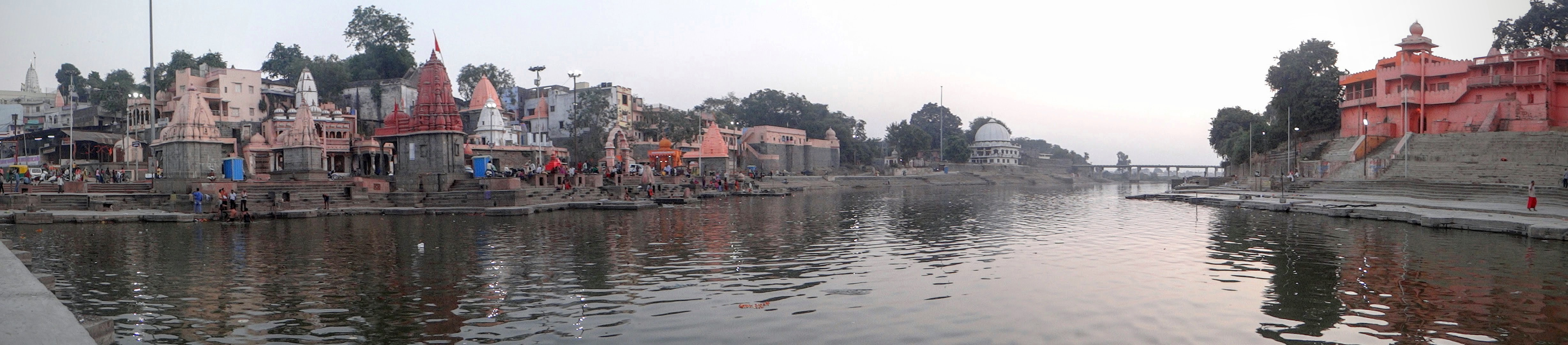
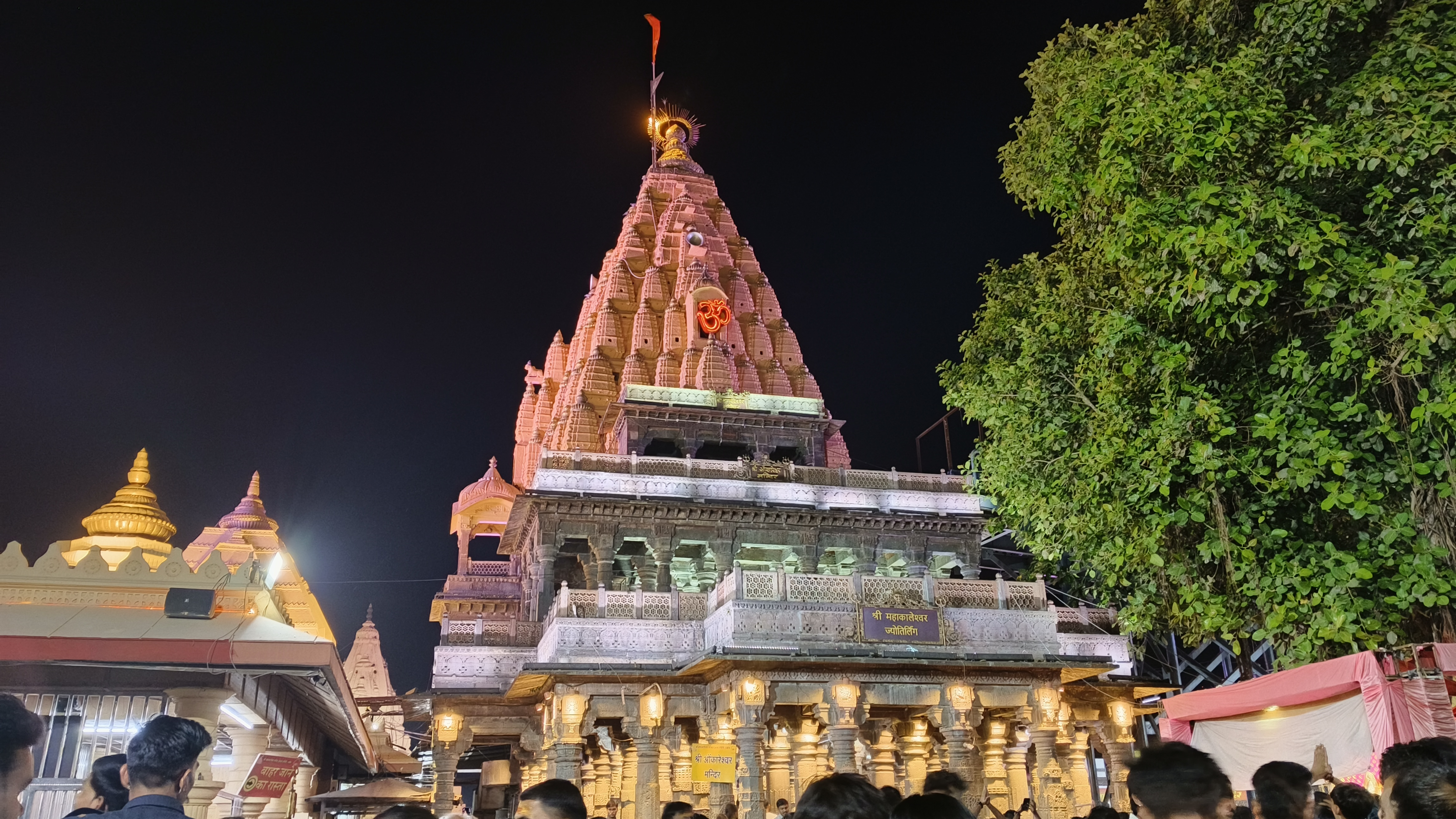
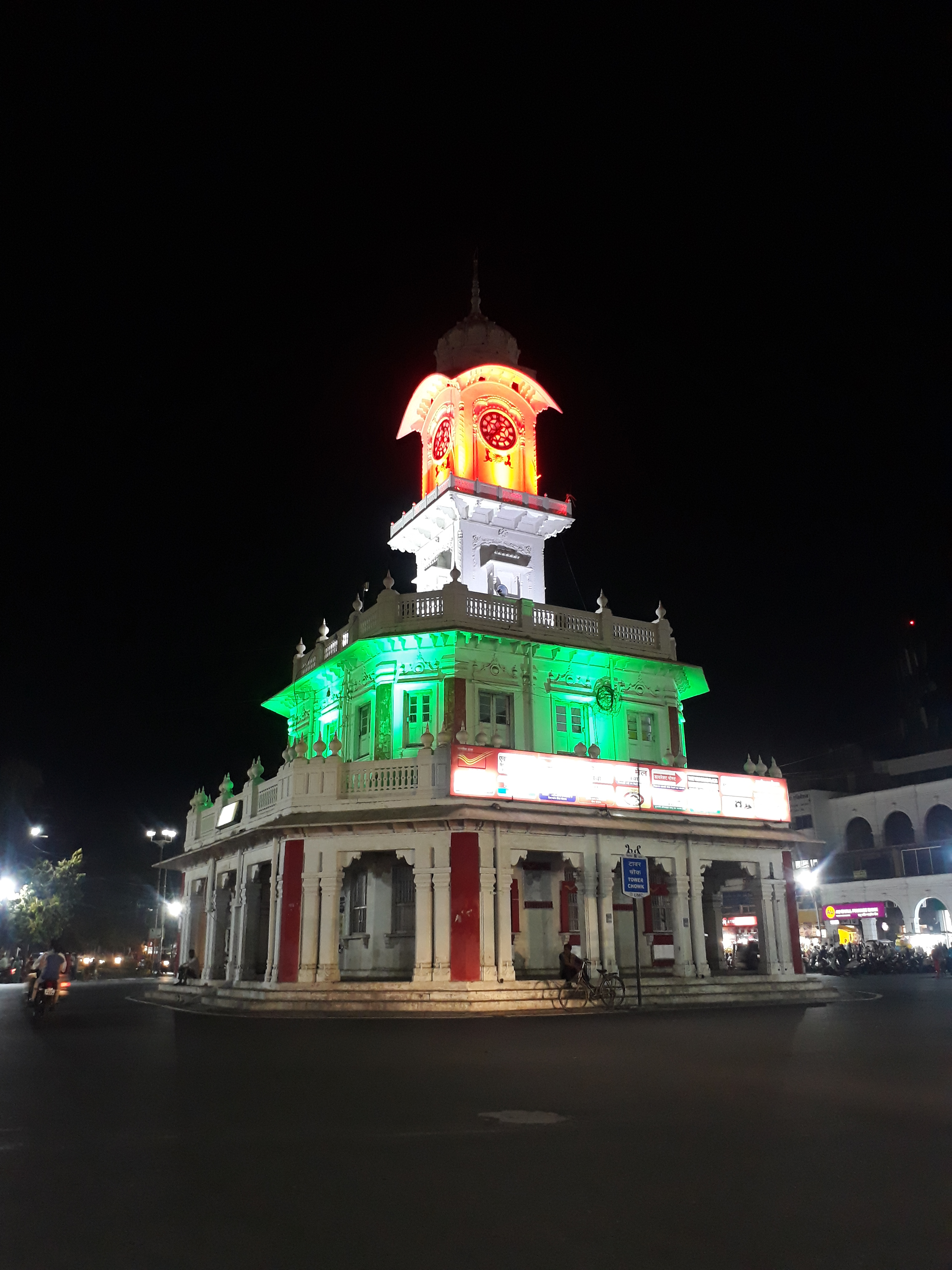
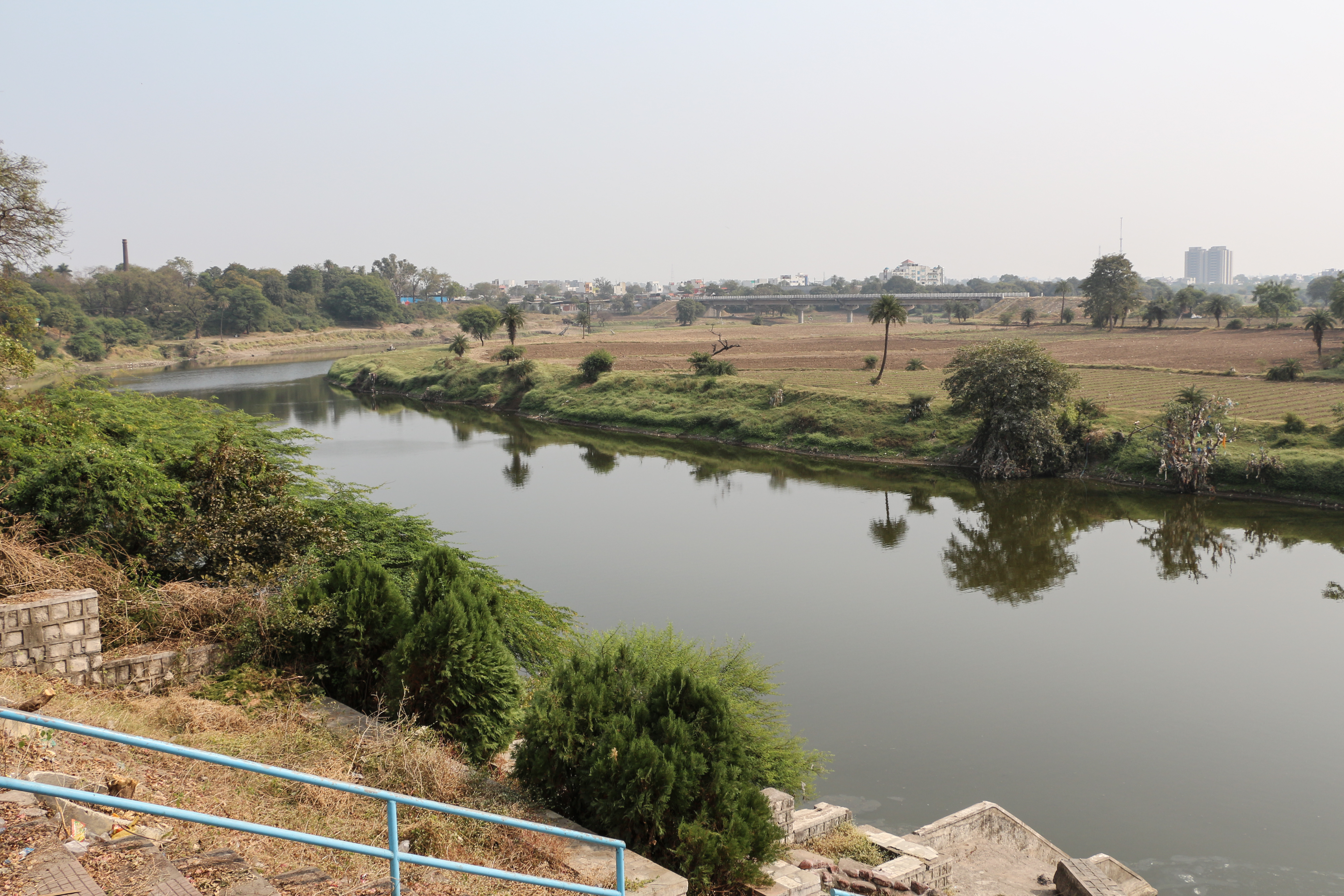
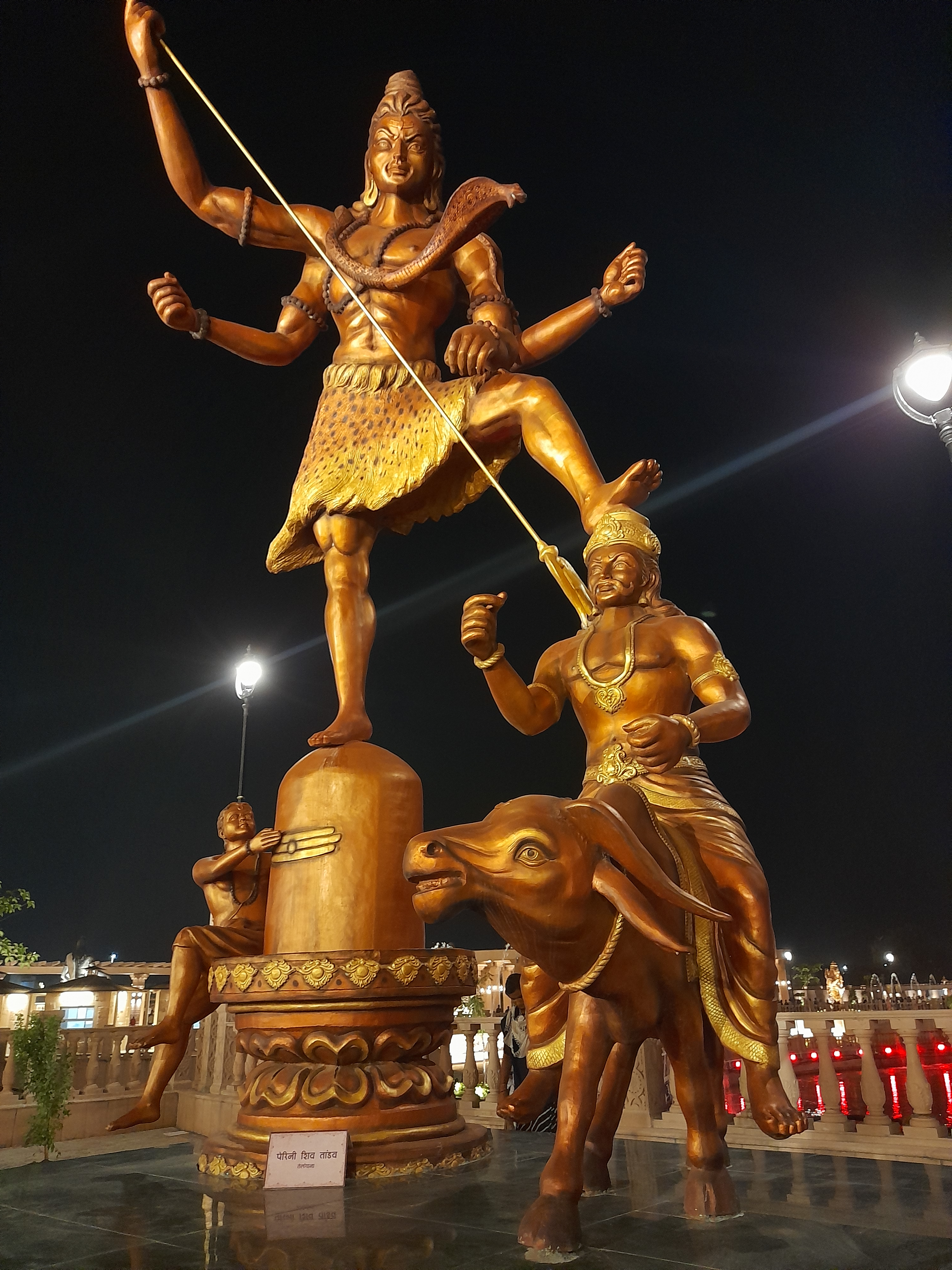
- Ram Ghat Mahakaleshwar Temple Tower Chowk Shipra River Mahakal corridor

- Location in India Ujjain (India)
- Coordinates: 23.17°N 75.79°E
- Country: India
- State: Madhya Pradesh
- Region: Malwa
- District: Ujjain
- Ward: 54 Wards
- Urbanised: c. 700 BCE

Government
  - Type: Municipal corporation
  - Body: Ujjain Municipal Corporation
  - Mayor: Jayti Singh (BJP)
  - MP: Anil Firojiya, BJP
  - Municipal Commissioner: Shri Ashish Singh, IAS

Area
  - Metropolitan city: 151.83 km^{2} (58.62 sq mi)
  - Metro: 745 km^{2} (288 sq mi)
  - Rank: 5th in M.P.
- Elevation: 494 m (1,621 ft)

Population (2011)
  - Metropolitan city: 515,215
  - Rank: 5th in M.P.
  - Density: 3,400/km^{2} (8,800/sq mi)
  - Metro: 885,566

Languages
  - Official: Hindi
  - Other: Malvi
- Time zone: UTC+5:30 (IST)
- PIN: 456001, 456003, 456006, 456010, 456661, 456664.456668
- Telephone code: 0734
- Vehicle registration: MP-13
- Climate: Cwa (Köppen)
- Precipitation: 900 millimetres (35 in)
- Avg. annual temperature: 24.0 °C (75.2 °F)
- Avg. summer temperature: 31 °C (88 °F)
- Avg. winter temperature: 17 °C (63 °F)
- Website: ujjain.nic.in

Ujjain (/uːˈdʒeɪn/, Hindi pronunciation: [ʊ̯d͡ːʑæn], [əʋən̪t̪ɪkaː]), also known as Ujjayini, is a city in Ujjain district of the Indian state of Madhya Pradesh. It is the fifth-largest city in Madhya Pradesh by population and is the administrative as well as religious centre of Ujjain district and Ujjain division. It is one of the Hindu pilgrimage centres of Sapta Puri famous for the Kumbh Mela (Simhastha) held there every 12 years. The ancient and world famous temple of Mahakaleshwar Jyotirlinga is located in the center of the city. The city has been one of the most prominent trade and political centres of the Indian subcontinent from the time of the ancient Mahājanapadas until the British colonisation of India.

An ancient city situated on the eastern bank of the Shipra River, then known as Avantika, it was the most prominent city on the Malwa plateau of central India for much of its history. It emerged as the political centre of central India around 600 BCE. It was the capital of the ancient Avanti kingdom, one of the sixteen Mahājanapadas. During the 18th century, the city briefly became the capital of the Scindia state of the Maratha Confederacy, when Ranoji Scindia established his capital at Ujjain in 1731. It remained an important political, commercial, and cultural centre of Central India until the early 19th century, when the British administrators decided to develop Indore as an alternative to it. Ujjain continues to be an important place of pilgrimage for Shaivites, Vaishnavites and Shaktas. Bathing in the holy Shipra river of Ujjain liberates one from sins. Therefore, Ujjain is also called the 'Mokshadayini city'. The name of this river is taken among the holy rivers like Kaveri, Narmada, Godavari and Krishna.

According to Puranic legend, Ujjain, along with Haridwar, Nashik, and Prayag, is one of four sites where drops of amrita, the elixir of immortality, accidentally spilled over from a kumbha (pitcher) while being carried by the celestial bird Garuda during the Samudra Manthana, or the churning of the ocean of milk.

Ujjain has been selected as one of the hundred Indian cities to be developed as a smart city under Prime Minister Narendra Modi's flagship Smart Cities Mission.

== History ==
=== Prehistoric era ===
Excavations at Kayatha (around 26 km from Ujjain) have revealed Chalcolithic agricultural settlements dating to around 2000 BCE. Chalcolithic sites have also been discovered at other areas around Ujjain, including Nagda, but excavations at Ujjain itself have not revealed any Chalcolithic settlements. Archaeologist H. D. Sankalia theorised that the Chalcolithic settlements at Ujjain were probably destroyed by the Iron Age settlers.

According to Hermann Kulke and Dietmar Rothermund, Avanti, whose capital was Ujjain, "was one of the earliest outposts in central India" and showed signs of early incipient urbanisation around 700 BCE. Around 600 BCE, Ujjain emerged as the political, commercial, and cultural centre of Malwa plateau.

The ancient walled city of Ujjain was located around the Garh Kalika hill on the bank of the river Kshipra, in the present-day suburban areas of the Ujjain city. This city covered an irregular pentagonal area of 0.875 km^{2}. It was surrounded by a 12 m high mud rampart. The archaeological investigations have also indicated the presence of a 45 meter wide and 6.6 m deep moat around the city. According to F. R. Allchin and George Erdosy, these city defences were constructed between the 6th and 4th centuries BCE. Dieter Schlingloff believes that these were built before 600 BCE. This period is characterised by structures made of stone and burnt-brick, tools and weapons made of iron, and black and red burnished ware.

According to the Puranic texts, a branch of the legendary Haihaya dynasty ruled over Ujjain.

=== Ancient period ===
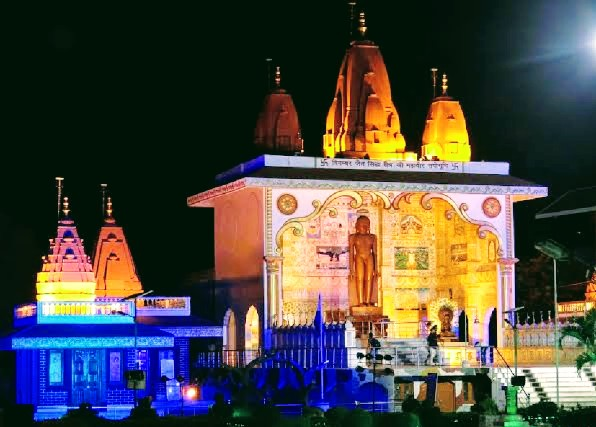
The Mahavira Tapo Bhumi

In the 4th century BCE, the Mauryan emperor Chandragupta annexed Avanti to his empire. Mauryan founded the City of Ujjain. The edicts of his grandson Ashoka mention four provinces of the Mauryan empire, of which Ujjain was the capital of the Western province. During the reign of his father Bindusara, Ashoka served as the viceroy of Ujjain, which highlights the importance of the town. As the viceroy of Ujjain, Ashoka married Devi, the daughter of a merchant from Vedisagiri (Vidisha). According to the Sinhalese Buddhist tradition, their children, Mahendra and Sanghamitra, who preached Buddhism in modern Sri Lanka, were born in Ujjain.

From the Mauryan period, Northern Black Polished Ware, copper coins, terracotta ring wells, and ivory seals with Brahmi text have been excavated at Ujjain. Ujjain emerged as an important commercial centre, partially because it lay on the trade route connecting north India to the Deccan, starting from Mathura. It also emerged as an important center for intellectual learning among Jain, Buddhist, and Hindu traditions.

In the Post-Mauryan period, the Sungas and the Satavahanas ruled the city consecutively. The Satavahanas and the Sakas, known as Western Satraps, contested for control of the city for a period. After the Mauryans, Ujjain was controlled by a number of empires and dynasties, including local dynasties, the Shungas, the Western Satraps, and the Satavahanas.

Ujjain remained an important city during the Gupta rule in the 4th and the 5th centuries. Notable poet Kalidasa refers to Ujjain multiple times, and appears to have spent at least a part of his life in Ujjain. In his epic work Meghadūta, he describes the richness of Ujjain and its people. In the 7th century CE the Chinese pilgrim Xuanzang visited India. He describes the ruler of Avanti as a king who was generous to the poor and presented them with gifts.

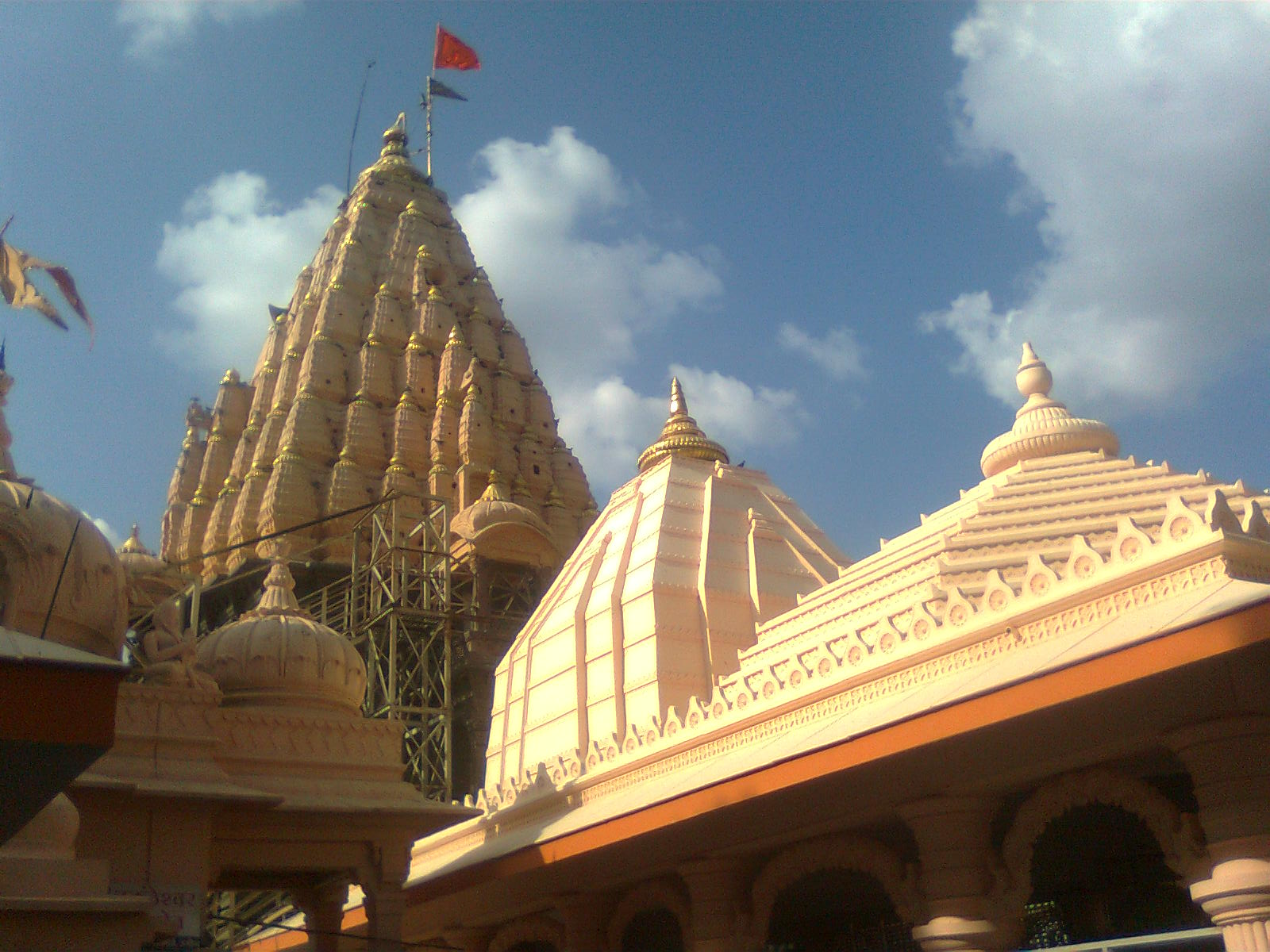
The famed historical Mahakaleshwar Jyotirlinga temple is in Ujjain

Bhartṛhari is said to have written his great epics, Virat Katha, Neeti Sataka, the love story of Pradyot Princess Vasavadatta and Udayan in Ujjayini, as the city was called during his times. The writings of Bhasa are set in Ujjain, and he probably lived in the city. Mrichchhakatika by Shudraka is also set in Ujjain. Ujjain also appears in several stories as the capital of the legendary emperor Vikramaditya of the Parmar dynasty. Somadeva's Kathasaritsagara (11th century) mentions that the city was created by Vishwakarma, and describes it as invincible, prosperous and full of wonderful sights. Ujjain was sacked several times by the Arabs of the Umayyad Caliphate in the 8th century CE. The Arabs called the city Uzayn.

=== Medieval period ===
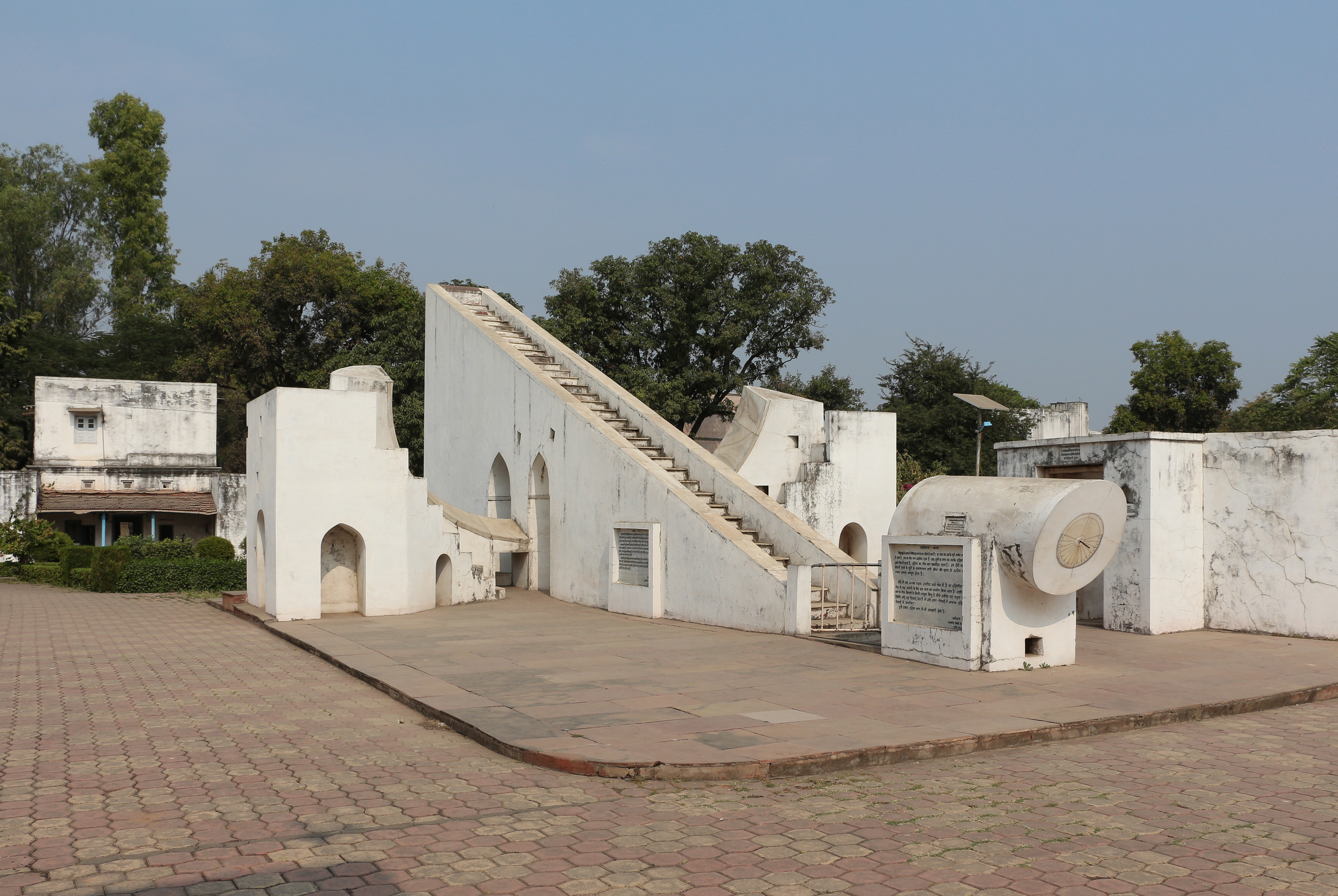
The Jantar Mantar at Ujjain was commissioned by Jai Singh II (1688-1743) of Jaipur.

The Paramaras (9th-14th century CE) built the City of Ujjain and shifted the region's capital from Ujjain to Dhar. Mahmud of Ghazni sacked the city and forced it to pay tribute during his invasion in India. In 1235 CE, Iltutmish of the Delhi Sultanate plundered the city. With the decline of the Paramara kingdom, Ujjain ultimately came under Islamic rule, like other parts of north-central India. The city continued to be an important city of central India. As late as the time of the Mughal vassal Jai Singh II (1688-1743), who constructed a Jantar Mantar in the city, Ujjain was the largest city and capital of the Malwa Subah. The city continued to be developed during Muslim rule, especially under the Delhi Sultanate and the Mughal Empire. It was used as an important military headquarters.

=== Modern period ===
During the 18th century, the city briefly became the capital of Scindia state of the Maratha Empire, when Ranoji Scindia established his capital at Ujjain in 1731. Mahadji Scindia constructed a grand palace with a hundred rooms around which the Maratha sardars constructed their own mansions. Ruined and destroyed temples were restored and newer ones were built. But his successors moved to Gwalior, where they ruled the Gwalior State in the latter half of the 18th century. The struggle of supremacy between the Holkars of Indore and Scindias (who ruled Ujjain) led to rivalry between the merchants of the two cities. On 18 July 1801, the Holkars defeated the Scindias at the Battle of Ujjain. On 1 September, Yashwantrao Holkar entered the city, and demanded a sum of 15 lakh rupees from the city. He received only 1/8th of this amount; the rest was pocketed by his officers. A force sent by Daulatrao Scindia later regained control of Ujjain. After both Holkar and Scindias accepted the British suzerainty, the British colonial administrators decided to develop Indore as an alternative to Ujjain, because the merchants of Ujjain had supported certain anti-British people. John Malcolm, the British administrator of Central India, decided to reduce the importance of Ujjain "by transferring a great part of that consequence it now enjoys to the Towns of Indore and Rutlam cities, which are and will continue more under our control."

After Indian independence, Ujjain was placed in Madhya Bharat state, which in turn was fused into Madhya Pradesh in 1956.

== Geography ==
Ujjain is located in the west-central part of India, and is north of the upper limit of the Vindhya mountain ranges. Located on the Malwa plateau, it is higher than the north Indian plains and the land rises towards the Vindhya Range to the south. Ujjain's coordinates are 23°10′N 75°46′E with an average elevation of 494 m (1620 ft). The region is an extension of the Deccan Traps, formed between 60 and 68 million years ago at the end of the Cretaceous period. The city is on the bank of the river Shipra which flows into the nearby Chambal.

=== Climate ===
Climate of the city features a typical version of the humid subtropical climate (Köppen Cwa). Summers usually starts by the middle of March which lasts up until late June. During which temperatures normally reaches up to 45 °C, with average maximum peaking in May with 41 °C. Monsoon starts in late June and ends in late September. These months see about 36 inches (914 mm) of precipitation, frequent thunderstorms and flooding. This season usually features wet phase of comfortable with average temperatures around 24 °C (76 °F) but this is accompanied with frequent downpours. This wet phase is followed by dry phase which results in humid weather with high temperatures. Temperatures rise again up to early November when winter starts, which lasts up to early March. Winters are cool, dry and sunny with occasional cold snaps during which temperature may drop to close to freezing (0° to 3 °C). Otherwise temperatures are very much comfortable, with average daily temperatures around 16 °C (61 °F).

Climate data for Ujjain (1991–2020, extremes 1954–2012)
Month	Jan	Feb	Mar	Apr	May	Jun	Jul	Aug	Sep	Oct	Nov	Dec	Year
Record high °C (°F)	34.6 (94.3)	39.0 (102.2)	42.5 (108.5)	45.2 (113.4)	46.0 (114.8)	45.5 (113.9)	41.1 (106.0)	37.0 (98.6)	39.8 (103.6)	39.8 (103.6)	36.6 (97.9)	34.9 (94.8)	46.0 (114.8)
Mean daily maximum °C (°F)	26.4 (79.5)	29.4 (84.9)	34.9 (94.8)	38.9 (102.0)	40.9 (105.6)	37.3 (99.1)	31.0 (87.8)	29.1 (84.4)	31.5 (88.7)	33.8 (92.8)	30.9 (87.6)	28.2 (82.8)	32.5 (90.5)
Mean daily minimum °C (°F)	8.7 (47.7)	10.6 (51.1)	14.8 (58.6)	19.5 (67.1)	24.8 (76.6)	25.0 (77.0)	23.2 (73.8)	22.2 (72.0)	21.4 (70.5)	18.0 (64.4)	13.7 (56.7)	9.4 (48.9)	17.4 (63.3)
Record low °C (°F)	0.0 (32.0)	1.0 (33.8)	4.6 (40.3)	10.1 (50.2)	12.0 (53.6)	18.7 (65.7)	18.0 (64.4)	16.5 (61.7)	11.8 (53.2)	8.1 (46.6)	2.8 (37.0)	0.5 (32.9)	0.0 (32.0)
Average rainfall mm (inches)	6.6 (0.26)	2.9 (0.11)	6.7 (0.26)	2.4 (0.09)	7.3 (0.29)	113.5 (4.47)	331.1 (13.04)	249.7 (9.83)	163.2 (6.43)	26.8 (1.06)	14.1 (0.56)	4.6 (0.18)	928.9 (36.57)
Average rainy days	0.5	0.5	0.4	0.4	0.7	6.3	12.1	10.2	6.8	1.6	1.0	0.3	40.8
Average relative humidity (%) (at 17:30 IST)	40	31	24	20	22	42	68	76	64	42	40	41	42
Source: India Meteorological Department

Ujjain has been ranked the 26th best "National Clean Air City" under Category 2 3-10L population cities in India.

== Demographics ==
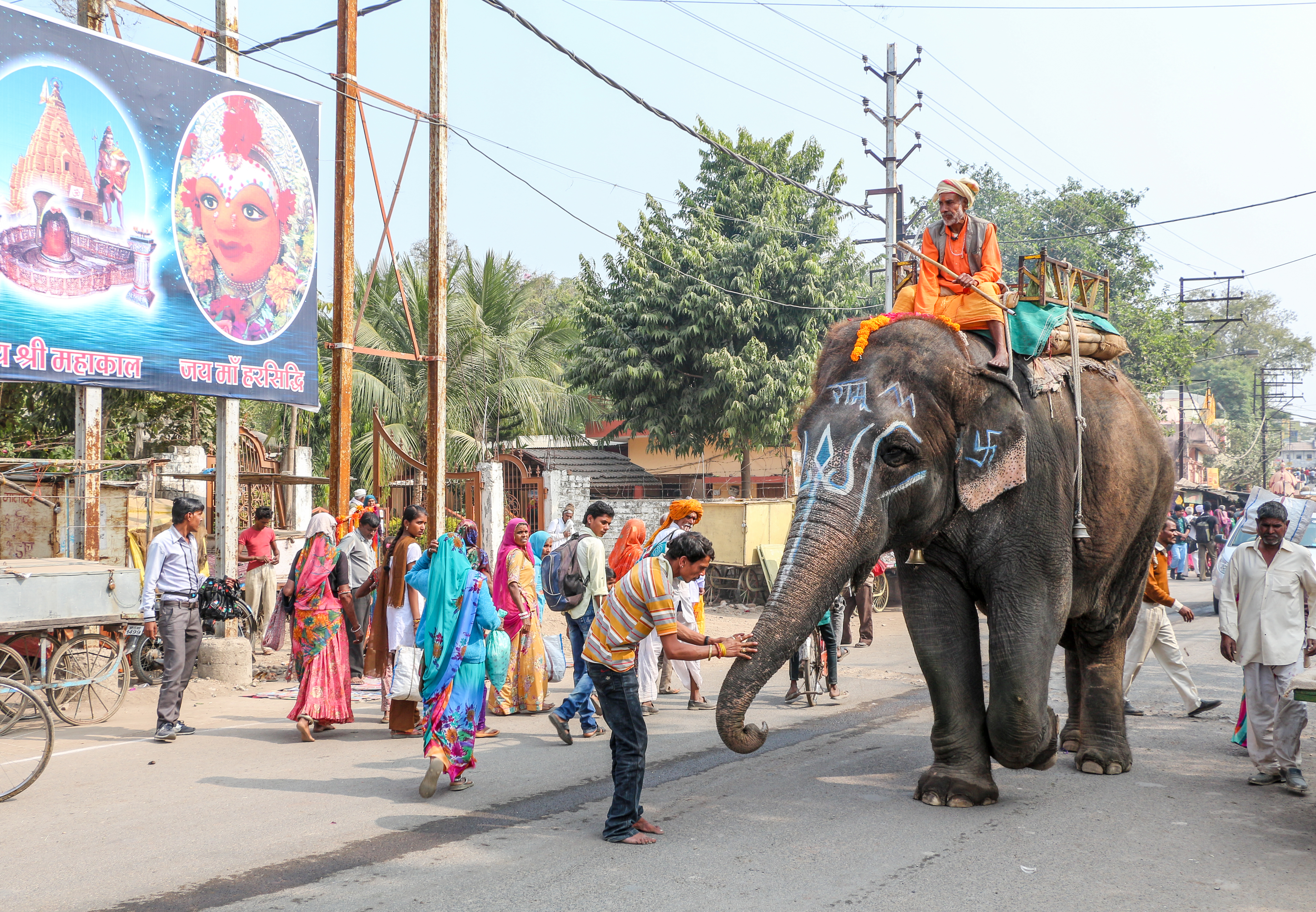
Harsiddhi Marg in Ujjain

According to the 2011 census, Ujjain had a population of 515,215, comprising 265,291 males and 249,924 females, giving a sex ratio of 942 per 1000. The overall literacy rate was 85.55%, with male literacy at 91.16% and female literacy at 79.62%.

Religions in Ujjain City (2011)
Religion	Percent
Hinduism	77.51%
Islam	18.88%
Jainism	2.44%
Christianity	0.51%
Other or not stated	0.66%

Languages of Ujjain (2011)
1. Hindi (84.2%)
2. Urdu (5.82%)
3. Malvi (3.59%)
4. Gujarati (1.98%)
5. Marathi (1.93%)
6. Sindhi (1.46%)
7. Others (1.05%)

Hindi is the most-spoken language. Being the heartland of the Malwa region, Malvi is also widely spoken.

== Government and jurisdiction ==
Most of the regions surrounding the city are administered by the Ujjain Municipal Corporation (UMC). The city is administered by a Divisional Commissioner and a Collectorate Office as well as the Mayor. They are responsible for the town and Country Planning Department, Forest Department, Public Health Engineering, Public Works Department and MP Electricity Board.

Ujjain has been a metropolitan municipality with a mayor-council form of government. The Ujjain Municipal Corporation (UMC) was established in 1956 under the Madhya Pradesh Nagar Palika Nigam Adhiniyam. The UMC was established in 1886 as Nagar Palika, but the Municipal Corporation of Ujjain was declared on a par with the Gwalior Municipal Corporation. The UMC is responsible for public education, correctional institutions, libraries, public safety, recreational facilities, sanitation, water supply, local planning and welfare services. The mayor and councillors are elected to five-year terms.

The Ujjain Development Authority, also known as UDA, is the urban planning agency serving Ujjain. Its headquarters are located in the Bharatpuri area of Ujjain. It was established under the Madhya Pradesh Town and Country Planning Act, 1973.

Ujjain Lok Sabha constituency is one of the 29 Lok Sabha constituencies in Madhya Pradesh state in central India. This constituency came into existence in 1951 as one of the 9 LokSabha constituencies in the erstwhile Madhya Bharat state. It is reserved for the candidates belonging to the Scheduled Castes since 1966. This constituency covers the entire Ujjain district and part of Ratlam district. Previously, Dr. Chintamani Malviya of the Bharatiya Janata Party was the member of parliament who won in the 2014 Indian general elections.

The current Member of Parliament from Ujjain is Anil Firojiya (BJP) after the Lok Sabha Election of 2019.

== Notable sites ==
- Chintaman Ganesh Temple
- Harsiddhi Temple
- ISKCON Temple
- Kal Bhairav Temple
- Mahakaleshwar Jyotirlinga
- Mangalnath Temple
- Sandipani Ashram
- Siddhwat Temple

== Education ==
=== University ===
- Maharshi Panini Sanskrit University
- Vikram University
- Avantika University

=== Medical colleges ===
- Ruxmaniben Deepchand Gardi Medical College
- Govt. Medical College
- Amaltas Medical College

=== Engineering colleges ===
- Ujjain Engineering College (Govt.)
- School of Engineering Vikram University (Govt.)
- MIT Group of Institutes, Ujjain
- Shree Guru Sandipani Institute of Science and Technology
- Prashanti Institute of Technology
- Alpine Institute of Technology

=== Schools ===
- St. Paul's Convent H.S. School
- Christu Jyoti Convent School
- Ujjain Public School
- Lokmanya Tilak higher Secondary School, Ujjain
- St. Mary's Convent School
- Nirmala Convent School
- Takshshila Junior College
- Kalidas Montessori Sr. Sec. School
- Carmel Convent Sr. Sec. School

== Industry ==
Major industrial areas surrounding Ujjain are Dewas Road Industrial Area, Maxi Road Industrial Area Vikram Udhogpuri, and Tajpur Industrial Area.

Indore and Dewas are the cities where majority of the industries are present. Both Indore and Dewas are in close proximity to Ujjain, providing employment to people in Ujjain and nearby areas.

The Government of Madhya Pradesh has allotted 1,200 acres for the development of an industrial area on the Dewas-Ujjain Road (MP State Highway 18) near Narwar village. Originally named "Vikramaditya Knowledge City", the area was envisaged as an educational hub. Due to diminished investment prospects, it was renamed to "Vikram Udyog Nagari" ("Vikram Industrial City"). As of 2014, the government has conceptualised it as a half-industrial, half-educational area. The stakeholders in the project include the state government and the Delhi Mumbai Industrial Corridor (DMIC) Trust.

== Transportation ==
=== Airport ===
Ujjain does not have any airport but has an airstrip on Dewas road which is used for air transport purposes. In 2013, the Government of Madhya Pradesh started a Ujjain-Bhopal air services as a joint venture with Ventura AirConnect. Due to very low booking, the ambitious project was scrapped. The main reason for the failure of the plan was due to improper timing of flights. The nearest airport is the Devi Ahilyabai Holkar International Airport at Indore (57 km).

=== Railway ===
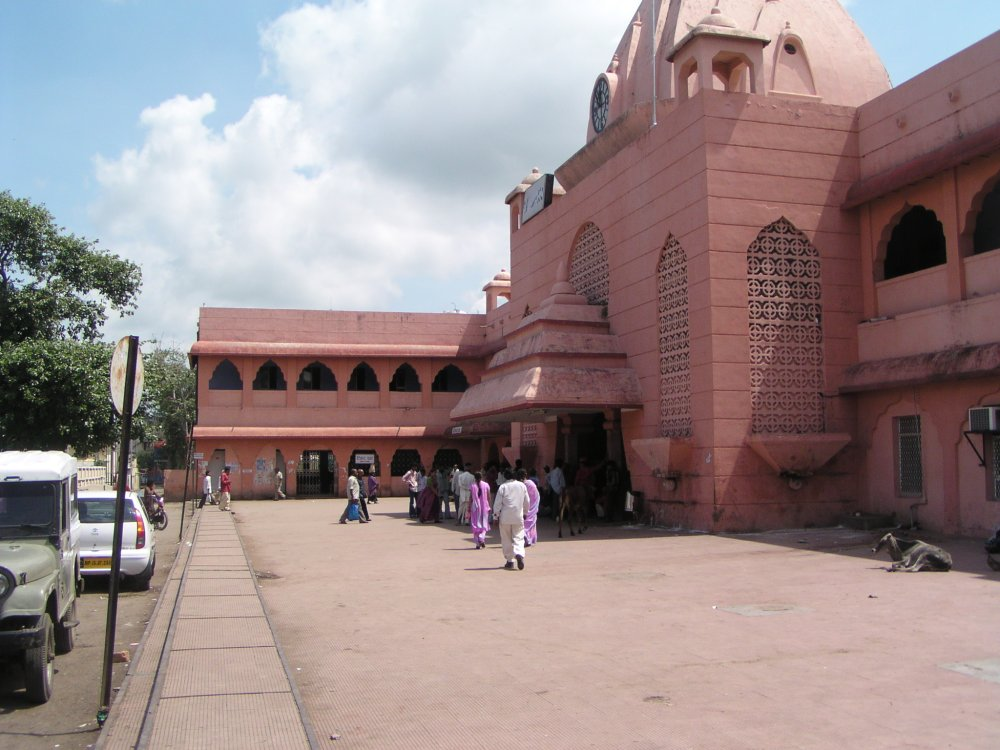
Ujjain Junction

Ujjain Junction is the main railway station of Ujjain, and it is directly or indirectly well-connected to all the major railway stations in India. It lies on the Indore–Dewas, Ratlam–Bhopal, Indore–Nagda and Guna–Khandwa route. To the west it is connected to Ratlam Junction, to the north it is connected with Nagda Junction, to the east it is connected with Maksi Junction, Bhopal Junction, and to the south it is connected to Indore Junction BG, Dewas Junction Harda BG.

There are six railway stations in the Ujjain city and its suburbs:

Station name	Station code	Railway zone	Total platforms
Ujjain Junction	UJN	Western Railway	08
Chintaman Ganesh	CNN	Western Railway	03
Matana Buzurg	MABG	Western Railway	02
Pingleshwar	PLW	Western Railway	02
Vikramnagar	VRG	Western Railway	03
Tajpur	TJP	Western Railway	02

=== Road ===
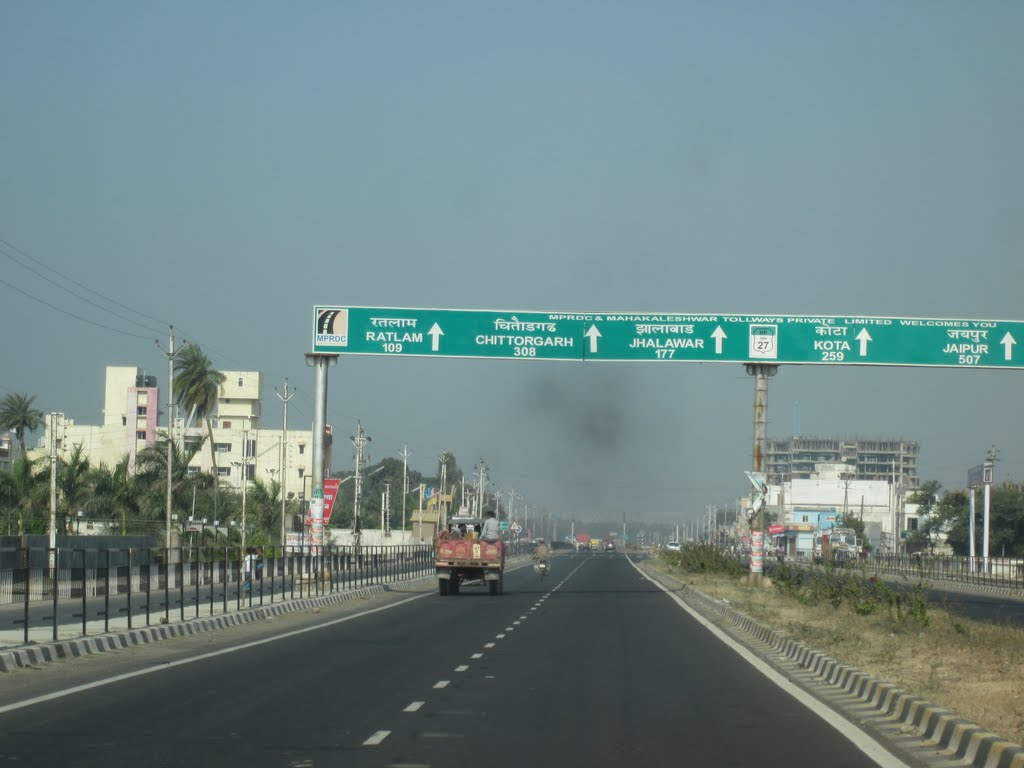
Ujjain-Indore Highway

Dewas Gate Stand and Nana Kheda Bus Stand are the two bus stands in the city that provide service to destinations located in the states. A large number of state run private buses are available for Ahmedabad, Jaipur, Ajmer, Khajuraho, Harda, Indore, Bhopal, Pune, Mumbai, Kota, Mandu, Jhalawar and various other locations. The city has a well connected road network including Indore Road, Badnagar Road, Dewas Road, Agar Road, Nagda Road and Maksi Road. There are three national highways; 47 connects to Ahmedabad, proposed 148NG connects to Garoth and 552G connects to Indore.

Other regional highways passing through the city are:

- Indore – Ujjain Road via SH 27 part of NH 552G
- Kota / Agar – Ujjain Road via NH 552G
- Bhopal / Dewas – Ujjain Road via SH 18 now NH 148NG
- Ratlam / Barnagar – Ujjain Road via SH 18 now NH
- Jaora / Nimach – Ujjain Road via SH 17
- Maksi – Ujjain Road (Connects to NH 3)
- Harda - Ujjain Road (Connects to Via National Highway 59A NH 47) and SH 18
- Ujjain - Garoth Proposed New Green Field Four Lane National Highway No NH 148NG

==== Local transport ====
Ujjain depends on an extensive network of auto rickshaws, city busses, private taxis and Tata Magic, that operate throughout the city, connecting one part with another. UMC has recently introduced city buses with a public private partnership project as the city was identified urban agglomerations with less than 1 million population under the Jawaharlal Nehru National Urban Renewal Mission.

== Sports ==
Cricket is one of the most popular sports in the city. Ujjain is also home to the Ujjain Divisional Cricket Association which is affiliated to BCCI. The city does not have any big stadium, but hosted Ranji Trophy matches at Pipe Factory Ground in 1977 and 1980.

Kite flying is another popular activity in the city around Makar Sakranti.

== Smart city ==
Ujjain city was shortlisted under the Government of India's flagship programme Smart Cities Mission. Under the mission, Ujjain Municipal Corporation (UMC) shall participate in the smart cities challenge by Ministry of Urban Development. As part of this, UMC is preparing a Smart City Proposal (SCP). The SCP will include smart city solutions based on the consultations to be held with the key stakeholders of the city. UMC invited the suggestions from citizens of Ujjain to make ‘Ujjain as a smart city’. The citizens were able to post their views pertaining to basic services such as water supply, sewerage, urban transport, social infrastructure and e-governance.

== Notable people ==
Notable people who were born or lived in Ujjain include:

- Sage Sandipani
- Varāhamihira
- Bhāskara II
- Brahmagupta
- Chashtana
- Kālidāsa
- Devi (wife of Ashoka)
- Shivmangal Singh Suman
- Shreeram Shankar Abhyankar
- Bharthari
- Yashoda Devi
- Vivian Dsena
- Thawar Chand Gehlot
- Gundecha Brothers
- Satyanarayan Jatiya
- Hukam Chand Kachwai
- Sachida Nagdev
- Naman Ojha
- Paramartha
- Sartaj Singh
- Saumya Tandon
- Vikramaditya
- Juhi Parmar
- Goverdhan Lal Oza
- Sharma Bandhu
- V. S. Wakankar
- Sharad Joshi
- Mohan Yadav

== See also ==
- Mahakaleshwar Jyotirlinga
- Omkareshwar Jyotirlinga
- Ujjainiya
- Ujjaini Mahakali Temple
- Maratha Empire
- Scindia
- Gwalior State
- Dewas Junior State
- Dewas Senior State
- Dhar State
- Indore State

== Bibliography ==
- Rahman Ali; Ashok Trivedi; Dhirendra Solanki (2004). Buddhist remains of Ujjain region: excavations at Ṣodañga. Sharada Pub. House. ISBN 978-81-88934-15-7.
- Dipak Kumar Samanta (1996). Sacred Complex of Ujjain. D.K. Printworld. ISBN 978-81-246-0078-8.
- Hunter, Cotton, Burn, Meyer. "The Imperial Gazetteer of India", 2006. Oxford, Clarendon Press. 1909.
- Dongray, Keshav Rao Balwant (1935). Ujjain. Alijar Darbar Press, Gwalior.
- Pranab Kumar Bhattacharyya (1977). Historical Geography of Madhya Pradesh from Early Records. Motilal Banarsidass. p. 275. ISBN 978-0-8426-9091-1.
