= Ujjain Municipal Corporation =

Government of Ujjain, Madha Pradesh, India

Ujjain Municipal Corporation Ujjain Nagar Nigam

Type
- Type: Municipal corporation

Leadership
- Mayor: Mukesh Tatwal, BJP
- Municipal commissioner: Mr. Anshul Gupta since 2021

Structure
- Seats: 54
- Political groups: Government (37): BJP (37); Opposition (17): INC (17)

Elections
- Last election: 6 July 2022
- Next election: 2027

Meeting place
- Ujjain, Madhya Pradesh

Website
- www.ujjain.nic.in

Ujjain Municipal Corporation is the governing body of the city of Ujjain in the Indian state of Madhya Pradesh.

The municipal corporation consists of democratically elected members, is headed by a mayor and administers the city's infrastructure and public services. Members from the state's leading various political parties hold elected offices in the corporation. Municipal Corporation mechanism in India was introduced during British Rule with formation of municipal corporation in Madras (Chennai) in 1688, later followed by municipal corporations in Bombay (Mumbai) and Calcutta (Kolkata) by 1762. Ujjain Municipal Corporation is headed by Mayor of city and governed by Commissioner. Ujjain Municipal Corporation has been formed with functions to improve the infrastructure of town.

== History ==
Ujjain has been a metropolitan municipality with a mayor-council form of government. Ujjain Municipal Corporation (UMC) was established in 1956 under the Madhya Pradesh Nagar Palika Nigam Adhiniyam. The UMC was established in the year 1886 as Nagar Palika but the Municipal Corporation of Ujjain was declared on par with Gwalior Municipal Corporation. The UMC is responsible for public education, correctional institutions, libraries, public safety, recreational facilities, sanitation, water supply, local planning and welfare services. The mayor and councillors are elected to five-year terms.

== Revenue sources ==
The following are the Income sources for the Corporation from the Central and State Government.

=== Revenue from taxes ===
Following is the Tax related revenue for the corporation.

- Property tax.
- Profession tax.
- Entertainment tax.
- Grants from Central and State Government like Goods and Services Tax.
- Advertisement tax.

=== Revenue from non-tax sources ===
Following is the Non Tax related revenue for the corporation.

- Water usage charges.
- Fees from Documentation services.
- Rent received from municipal property.
- Funds from municipal bonds.
